= Municipal Theatre Museum =

Museum in Peru

Coordinates: 12.0464°S 77.0351°W

- Museo Municipal de Teatro
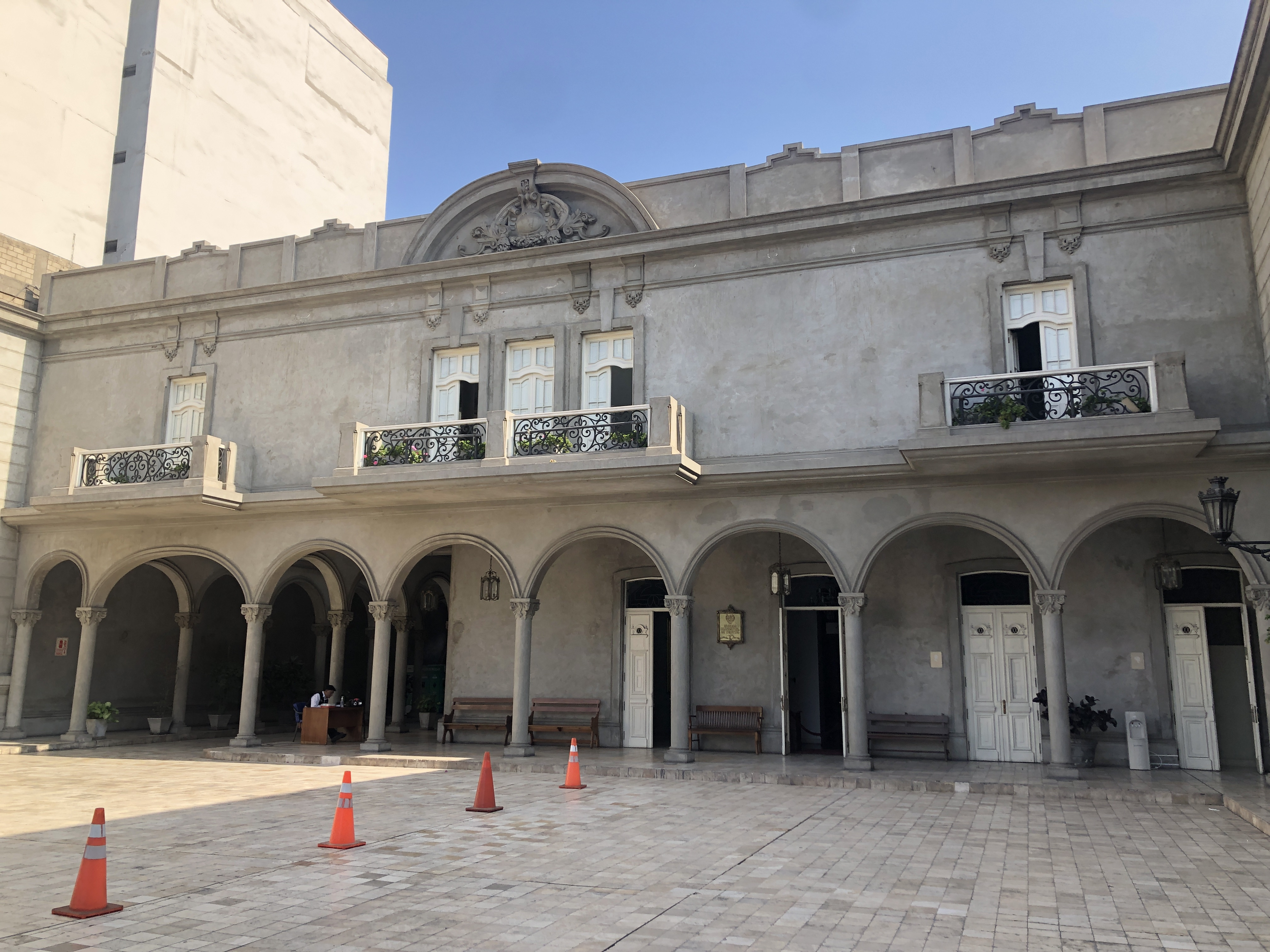
- The Municipal Theatre Museum in the Plaza de las Artes, Lima
- Established: 26 July 1966
- Location: Jirón Huancavelica 338, Lima

The Municipal Theatre Museum (Spanish: Museo Municipal de Teatro) is a museum in the historic centre of Lima, Peru. Formerly located on the first floor of the Teatro Segura, it is now located on Jirón Huancavelica 338, behind the Municipal Theatre of Lima.

== Location and exhibits ==
The museum, originally installed on the first floor of the Teatro Segura, has a wide collection of gifts and souvenirs donated by artists who performed in Lima, such as the slippers of Cuban dancer Alicia Alonso, Spanish dancer Carmen Amaya and the baton of Arturo Padovani, who directed to the musicians at the inauguration of the Forero Theatre. Also on display are the baton and piano of the artist Rosa Mercedes Ayarza de Morales, the first Peruvian artist to conduct an orchestra.

In one area, the history of theatre in Peru is explained, commencing from its origins in the viceregal era. Likewise, the museum has an extensive collection of photographic albums, including a photograph of Russian ballerina Anna Pavlova, two photographic albums and records of two complete operas recorded by tenor Alejandro Granda and an authentic photograph of the composer of the National Anthem of Peru, José Bernardo Alzedo.

Peru's Comisión de Promoción del Perú para la Exportación y el Turismo notes that the museum and the municipal theater in Lima are situated in "complementary" proximity to each other.

== See also ==
- Theatre in Peru
- Teatro Segura
