= Plazuela del Teatro =

Square in Lima, Peru

Coordinates: 12°02′49″S 77°02′03″W

Theatre Square
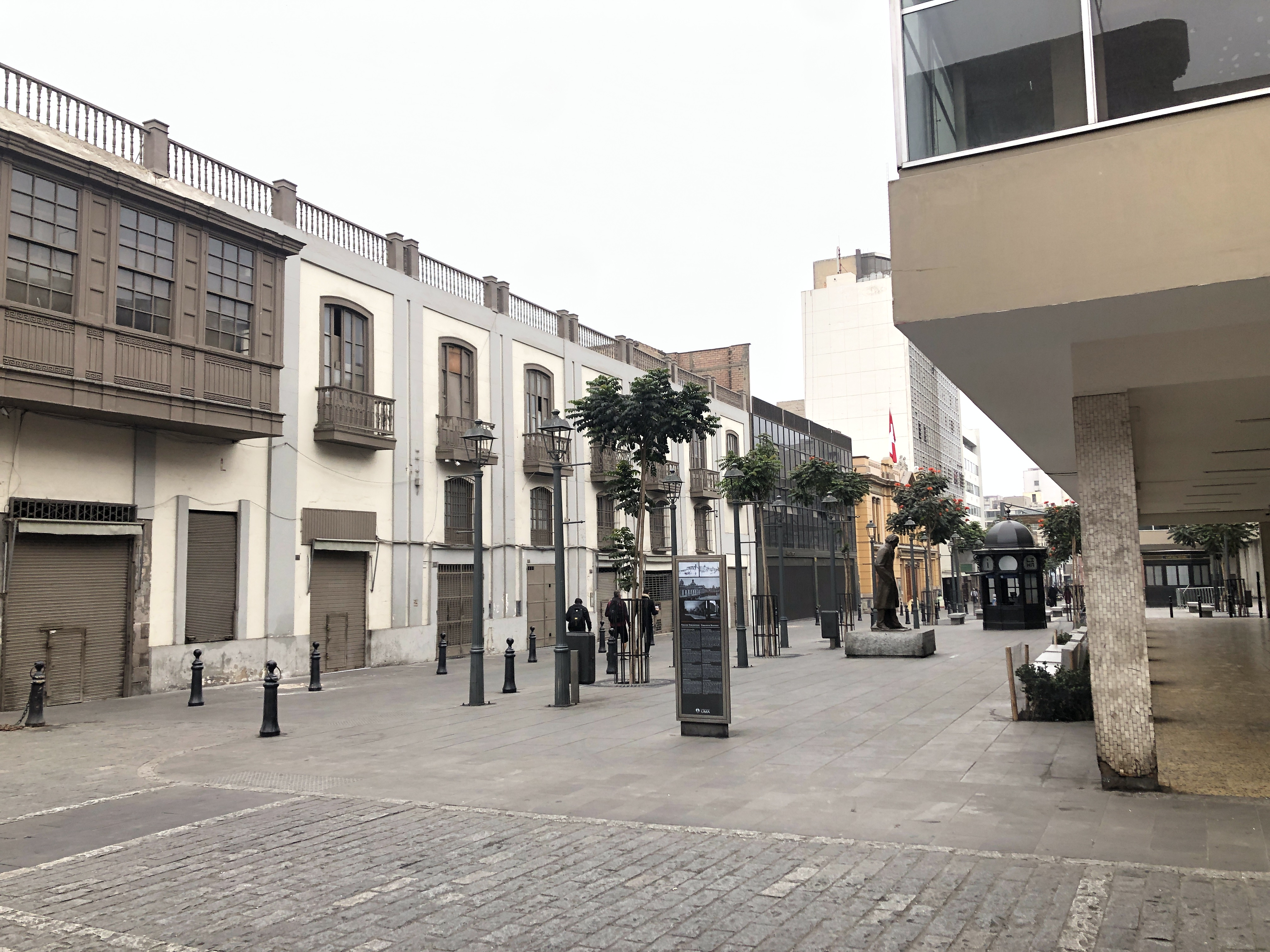
- Interactive map of Theatre Square
- Part of: Damero de Pizarro
- Namesake: Segura Theatre
- Type: Public square
- Location: Jirón Huancavelica

Theatre Square (Spanish: Plazuela del Teatro) is a public square located next to the Teatro Segura in the second block of Jirón Huancavelica, part of the historic centre of Lima, Peru.

== History ==
The second block of the current jirón Huancavelica was the location of one of the busiest comedy corrals in Lima since 1614. It was built in front of the 'false door' of the convent of San Agustín and would become the main centre of theatrical activity in the city.

It was after the independence of Peru when a small square was opened with the purpose of enhancing the façade of the Teatro Principal, in whose vicinity a growing audience gathered. In 1822, José de San Martín asked the community of San Agustín to donate land to build the plaza. Shortly after, the supreme delegate, José Bernardo de Tagle y Portocarrero, ordered the arrangement of an elongated space that would serve as a public walk. It was initially called September 7 Square, in memory of the landing of the Liberating Expedition in Paracas and the abandonment of Lima by the royalist troops. For this reason, the first stone of a future monument to San Martín was also placed there, which never came to fruition.

With the passage of time, this space would end up being called Plazuela del Teatro or Plazuela de la Comedia. Starting in 1846, it acquired a new appearance when the Portal de San Agustín was built in front of the theater coliseum. This configuration has essentially been maintained over time, even after the modernization of the square in the 1960s.

In the mid-19th century, the city of Lima experienced a proliferation of hotels and inns. One of the main ones was the Hotel del Universo, located in the Portal de San Agustin located in the Plazuela del Teatro, owned by the French citizen Estanislao Courtheoux. According to the chronicle of Manuel Atanasio Fuentes, in the hotel there was no food or coffee service, only furnished rooms. It was in one of these rented apartments on the upper floors of the Hotel del Universo that the National Club was initially established on October 19, 1855. Likewise, during the period of the Peruvian civil war of 1894-1895 that faced Nicolás de Piérola With Cacerist troops, Piérola established his headquarters in the Plazuela del Teatro, four blocks from the Plaza de Armas.

=== Monument ===
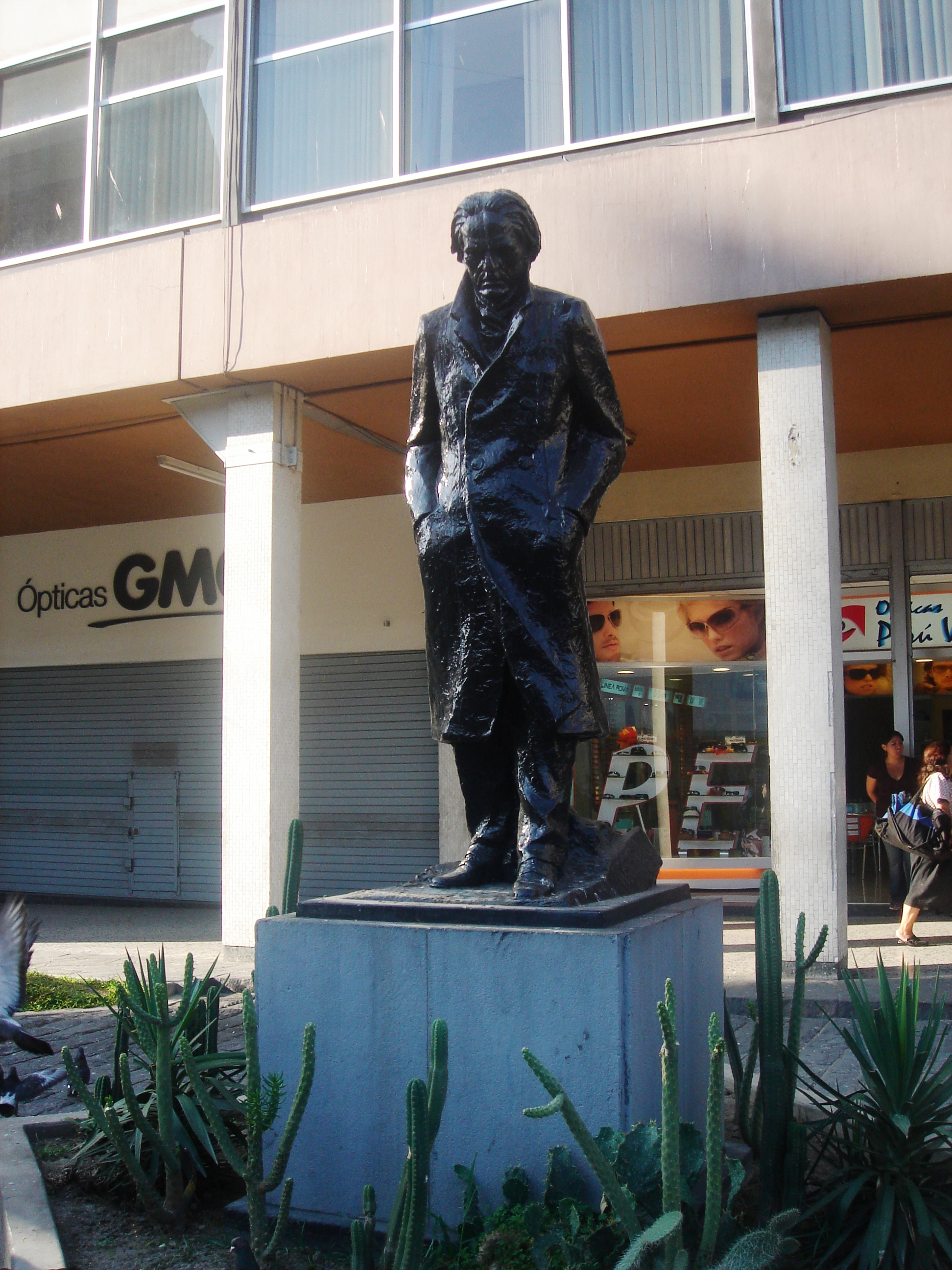
The monument in 2010.

The Monument to César Vallejo is a bronze monument of famous Peruvian poet and writer, César Vallejo. The statue is the work of artist Miguel Baca Rossi, from Chiclayo, and was inaugurated on April 15, 1983.
