= Miss Perú 1954 =

- Date: June 26, 1954
- Presenters: Pepe Ludmir
- Venue: Teatro Municipal (Lima)
- Entrants: 17
- Winner: Isabel León Velarde; Distrito Capital

The Miss Perú 1954 pageant was held on June 26, 1954. That year 17 candidates competed for the national crown. The winner, Isabel León Velarde, represented Peru at the Miss Universe 1954. The rest of the finalists would enter different pageants.

== Placements ==
| Final Results | Contestant |
|---|---|
| Miss Peru Universe 1954 | Distrito Capital - Isabel León Velarde |
| 1st Runner-Up | Region Lima - Ruth Dedekind |
| 2nd Runner-Up | Tacna - Lucrecia Ruiz |
| Top 7 | Huánuco - Frankie Mulánovich; Callao - Lili Izanórtegui; Apurímac - Sonia Velázquez; San Martín - Grace Becker |

== Special awards ==
- Best Regional Costume - Apurímac - Sonia Velázquez
- Miss Photogenic - Region Lima - Ruth Dedekind
- Miss Elegance - Region Lima - Ruth Dedekind
- Miss Congeniality - Huánuco - Frankie Mulánovich

== Delegates ==
- Apurímac - Sonia Velázquez
- Ayacucho - Gloria Yolanda Villa
- Cajamarca - Teresa Vigo
- Callao - Lili Izanórtegui
- Distrito Capital - Isabel León Velarde
- Huancavelica - Lucy Cornejo
- Huánuco - Frankie Mulánovich
- Ica - Monique Uribe
- Lambayeque - Adelaida Lugo
- Loreto - Federica Gonzalez
- Moquegua - Anastasia Estrada
- Pasco - Rebecca Velazco
- Region Lima - Ruth Dedekind
- San Martín - Grace Becker
- Tacna - Lucrecia Ruiz
- Tumbes - Maria Candelaria Ferrer
- USA Perú - Felicia Averitt
