= Miss Perú 1961 =

- Date: June 8, 1961
- Presenters: Pepe Ludmir
- Venue: Teatro Municipal (Lima)
- Entrants: 15
- Winner: Carmela Stein Bedoya; Ayacucho

The Miss Perú 1961 pageant was held on June 8, 1961. Fifteen candidates competed for the two national crowns. The winner represented Peru at the Miss Universe 1961 and Miss International 1961.The rest of the finalists would enter in different pageants.

== Placements ==
Final Results	Contestant
Miss Peru Universe 1961	Ayacucho - Carmela Stein Bedoya
Miss International Peru 1961	Loreto - Norma González Miranda
1st Runner-Up	Huánuco - Luisa María Cuculiza
Top 7	Cuzco - Eva Ocampo; Lambayeque - Heddy González Pérrigo; Arequipa - Luisa Arata; Callao - Rosario Orbegoso

== Special awards ==
- Best Regional Costume - Lambayeque - Heddy González
- Miss Photogenic - Ayacucho - Carmela Stein
- Miss Congeniality - Cuzco - Eva Ocampo
- Miss Elegance - Loreto - Norma González Miranda

.

== Delegates ==
- Amazonas - Alicia De La Riva Rossi
- Apurímac - Teresa Rivero
- Arequipa - Luisa Arata
- Ayacucho - Carmela Stein
- Callao - Rosario Orbegoso
- Cuzco - Eva Ocampo
- Distrito Capital - Heddie Hawie
- Europe Perú - Ellide Dupeyrat
- Huánuco - Luisa María Cuculiza
- Lambayeque - Heddy González Pérrigo
- Loreto - Norma González Miranda
- Madre de Dios - Vilma Mantilla
- Pasco - María Isabel Lucena
- San Martín - Luz Reyes
- Tacna - Nelly Amiel
