= Miss Perú 1959 =

- Date: July 15, 1959
- Presenters: Pepe Ludmir
- Venue: Teatro Municipal (Lima)
- Entrants: 16
- Winner: Guadalupe Mariátegui Hawkins; Callao

The Miss Perú 1959 pageant was held on July 15, 1959. That year, 33 candidates from different districts, cities and regions of Peru were enrolled, Sixteen candidates survived the first cut and competed for the two national crowns, culminating in the final night. The chosen winners represented Peru at the Miss Universe 1959 and, for the first time, at Miss World 1959. The rest of the finalists would enter different pageants.

== Placements ==
Final Results	Contestant
Miss Peru Universe 1959	Callao - Guadalupe Mariátegui Hawkins
Miss World Peru 1959	Piura - María Elena Rossel
1st Runner-Up	Tacna - Carmen Lavarello
2nd Runner-Up	Distrito Capital - Monona Velarde
Top 8	Lambayeque - Maritza Newman; Amazonas - Amelia 'Melita' Castro; Ica - Rosario Elías; San Martín - Mery Checa

== Special awards ==
- Miss Photogenic - Piura - María Elena Rossel
- Miss Congeniality - San Martín - Mery Checa
- Miss Elegance - Distrito Capital - Monona Velarde

.

== Delegates ==
- Amazonas - Amelia 'Melita' Castro
- Arequipa - Rosario García
- Callao - Guadalupe Mariátegui
- Distrito Capital - Monona Velarde
- Huancavelica - Violeta Ortega
- Ica - Rosario Elías
- Junín - Graciela Odriozola
- La Libertad - Carmela Condemarin
- Lambayeque - Maritza Newman
- Loreto - Olga Herbozo
- Madre de Dios - Cossi Zapata
- Moquegua - Graciela 'Chela' Olazabal
- Pasco - Maritza Pletikosich
- Piura - María Elena Rossel
- San Martín - Mery Checa
- Tacna - Carmen Lavarello
