= Theatre of Peru =

Overview of theatre in Peru

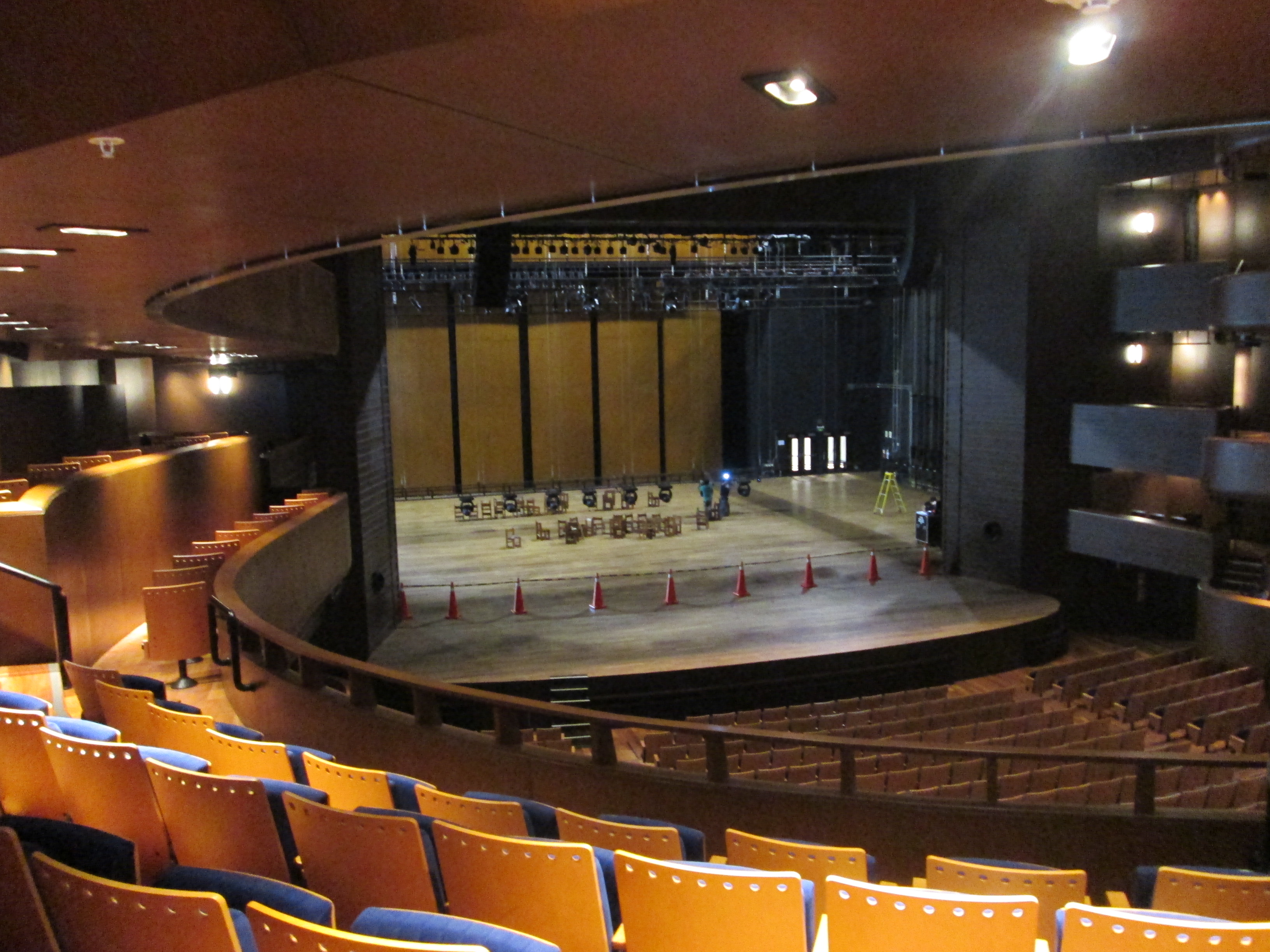
Auditorium of the Grand National Theatre.

Theatre in Peru has been developed since the 18th century. During this period, the most emblematic theatres of the city of Lima arose, such as the Teatro Principal (today the Segura), the Olimpo and Politeama; which were popular means of shows compared to bullfighting. As of 2019, theatre is most consumed in Lima, with 965 thousand people who resorted to this type of recreation, while in Tacna a higher percentage (23.2%) of its inhabitants attend events. In 2022, the performing arts involved 250 thousand people.

There are a series of works that were published locally, the first known style is the "harmonic comedy", at the request of the viceroys of the time. It was highly popular in viceregal times.

Years later, other creations focused on dramatic life stood out. The pioneering writers Felipe Pardo y Aliaga and Manuel Ascencio Segura stand out, who marked the national identity of Peru from 1820 to 1850. There were also productions created in Quechua, which highlights Ollantay as one of the first.

== Background ==
Although the artistic manifestations are based on rituals, dances and festivities from previous centuries, which were investigated by the historian Arturo Jiménez Borja. During the Inca Empire, the representations are classified in the Quechua terms wanca (drama) and araguay (comedy), in which they were staged in the malki, an area of artificial forests with no other additions. With the arrival of the Spanish, the first representation of a religious type dates from 1568.

The creations in Peruvian territory originate from the viceregal period with some evidence of public events in the 16th century AD. C. under the model of a corral de comedias, whose first venue called San Bartolomé was one of the oldest in South America. It was held between one or two weekly shows, in the afternoon, whose premises did not have a box office to sell tickets. In 1662 a new place was installed, the Colosseum of Comedies, which was destroyed after the earthquake of 1746. In 1672 they were held at night, in which many performances until 1747 were influenced by showy stage productions or, said otherwise, "Italian style". The first one made was La gloria de la niquea.

It is the eighteenth century that a series of codes of the viceroy Manuel de Amat y Junyent were decreed to become the main form of entertainment, which counted as the first guests at the Perricholi. Since 1774 there was a commissioner chosen by the Cabildo of Lima, who it is the equivalent of the inspector of later centuries. In 1790 Lorenzo Velazco launched the first theatre company in the country with 20 people in his group. In 1786 a series of much more severe guidelines were established to limit the dissemination of some scenes, motivated among them by political censorship, in charge of the new viceroy Teodoro de Croix.

With the independence of the country, in 1821, the functions remained in the zeal of the authorities to avoid consequences for the population. One of the cases that showed an "anti-Spanish" feeling was The patriots of Lima in the Happy Night by Miguel del Carpio in 1821.

== History ==
=== 19th century ===
Already in the Republican era and with the term "theatre" in mind, the focus was placed on the political discourse of independence. José de San Martín, who was one of the declaimers who resorted to the theatre scene to communicate to the population, promulgated a decree in which "stage art does not inflict infamy on those who profess it", which was shown in the Gazette on January 2, 1822. Although the theatre of Spanish origin remained in the transition to independent Peru, the first completely original work premiered was Frutos de la educación in 1829, with a comic tone elaborated by the pioneer of neoclassical current and qualified by Ricardo Palma as "one of the glories of Latin America", Felipe Pardo y Aliaga.

In 1829 the exclusion of the seating area by gender was eliminated. In 1834, the Charity of Lima, replacing the hospitals in the administration of properties, updated the regulation of shows in closed venues with rights and obligations of those involved. However, there was disinterest in visiting the performances, becoming unprofitable, a case that the entrepreneur Bernardo Soffia assigned to Manuel Ascencio Segura, to contact various actors in the area and thus promote works of interest; Segura was one of the pioneers in Creole identity, when he published works related to costumbrismo, together with Pardo y Aliaga, such as El sargento Canuto, which was well received by the public, and Ña Catita.

At that stage authors such as Ricardo Palma, known for El santo de Panchita, and Carlos Augusto Salaverry emerged. In 1821 the National Anthem of Peru premiered at the Teatro Principal, in the opera genre. Since then its interpreter, Rosa Merino, had a presence in musical performances. In turn, in 1828 the seats were listed for the first time, and in 1835 free access for the highest authorities in boxes was eliminated.

In those years they marked several milestones: After settling with the opera, it was consolidated with the first original performance, Il matrimonio segreto, in 1814, in which it had greater acceptance in 1840 and greater reception with the comic opera in the 1850s. On the other On the other hand, the Marquess of Torre Tagle promulgated the creation of the Siete de Septiembre (later Plazuela de Teatro), an additional venue next to the future Teatro Principal, later promoted as the "richest theatre in the Pacific" due to the entry of international celebrities.

In the face of a series of demonstrations against censorship, the Critical Examination (Spanish: Examen crítico) was born to point out the problems offered by the 1834 regulation, whose annotations were partly corrected in an 1849 update, by the charity based on national identity. In May 1863, a much more flexible regulation was published in El Peruano, it was supervised by Pedro Diez Canseco. Outside of Lima, the department of Trujillo established its own regulations to install its own theatre, while in 1859 the Municipal Theatre opened in Tacna.

With the economic boost of bringing shows from other countries, in 1856 the first theatre company entered Lima, directed by José Cortez. The function carried out was El valle de Andora.

In 1850 the Variedades stable theatre was inaugurated; in 1878, Politeama; and in 1886, the Olimpo theatre, both in Lima and with a capacity for more than a thousand attendees. At the time they were the oldest and most representative in Lima, but their constructions were precarious. In 1889, with the relocation of the then oldest area, the theatre with the largest capacity is restructured under the name of Principal Theatre of Lima (today the Teatro Segura). Due to the advances in legislation and the new society of the public according to the then publication La Revista Social, in 1898, new articles were promulgated, considered as a means of entertainment for all viewers.

Between 1829 and 1905, more than 400 creations by various authors were produced. Of which, around twenty-five works were written during the years 1883 and 1889. An example of them was the national creation of the opera La fronda by Carlos Enrique Pasta. In addition, more than forty theatre companies visited Lima until the 20th century. At the same time, Arequipa founded its first venue in 1893, the Fénix Theatre, whose functions were performed by the Spanish Dramatic Company.

=== 20th century ===
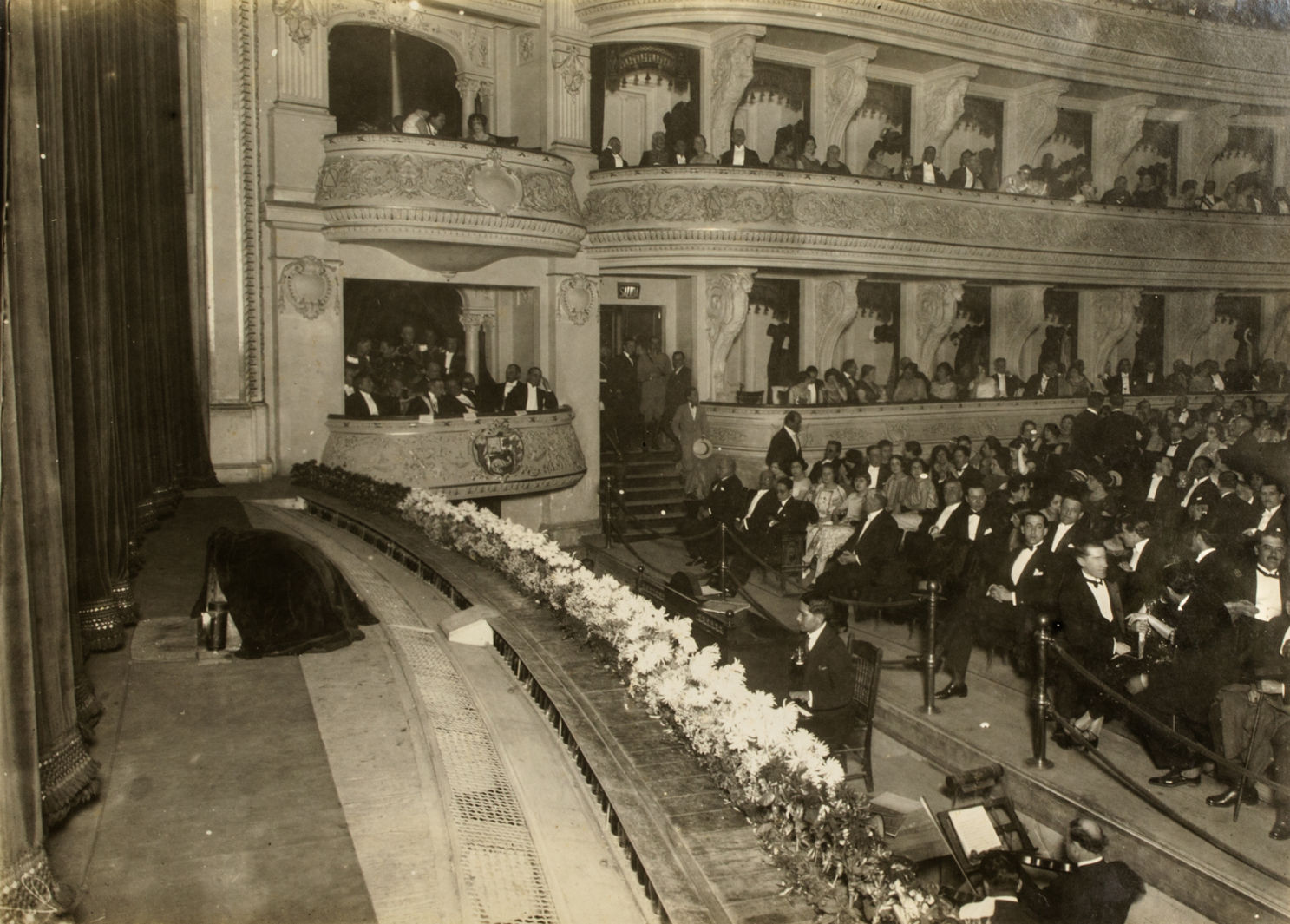
Interior of the Municipal Theatre of Lima in 1924.

In 1905, Manuel Moncloa y Covarrubias' Theatrical Dictionary of Peru was released, considered one of the complete sources to describe the progress of the scene in the country since the viceroyalty.

In 1911 Politeama caught fire, leaving it inoperative to show performances; however, that year the Teatro Colón was inaugurated, which remained in operation for almost a century. In 1915, in the area occupied by the Olimpo theatre, which was set on fire, the Forero installation was built under the direction of engineer Alfredo Viale. It was inaugurated on July 28, 1920, and was the predecessor of the Municipal Theatre of Lima. However, the title of "municipal" was adopted by the then Principal Theatre." A year later, in 1921, the Excelsior Theatre was built, which later it was renamed British after the purchase of the British–Peruvian Cultural Association.

In these years, works developed by various authors such as Juan Rivera Saavedra, Juan Gonzalo Rose, Julio Ortega, among others, were vitalized; as well as international guests such as Santiago Ontañón. In addition, the Baronti children's theatre company was consolidated, one of the first to appeal to the youngest since its creation in 1902. Several schools and companies were founded in Arequipa, Cuzco, Piura, Trujillo, among others. Solario Swayner and Sebastián Salazar Bondy experimented with the most recent creations. However, after the death of the latter in 1956, the dynamics slowed down. For his part, Ventura García Calderón was the one who brought modernity to dramaturgy with his play Holofernes in 1931.

==== Golden Age ====
Simultaneously, alternatives to theatre were developed for national radio, including radio dramas. In 1945, thanks to the intervention of the Minister of Education Jorge Basadre, the Fomento del Teatro Nacional was established by law 13107, under a financing system for new works. This was complemented with supreme resolutions 3716 and 3717. This would be managed by the then National Theatre Council by the historian Luis E. Valcárcel, who would be the predecessor of the National Institute of Culture. In 1946 the National Theatre Award was created, in that the first winner was Percy Gibson Parra; at the same time that the current National Superior School of Dramatic Art was established, which later published the Dictionary of 1905 more than a century later. In addition, the National Comedy Company and the People's Theatre, pillar organizations in modern theatre.

In addition, in 1938 the Association of Amateur Artists (AAA) was founded by Alejandro Miró Quesada Garland and company, which sought to promote theatre and dance. In 1953 Reynaldo D'Amore founded the Club de Teatro de Lima, the oldest in the country and trainer of talents for the end of the century such as Yvonne Frayssinet, Carlos Alcántara, Sergio Galliani, Tatiana Astengo, Giovanni Ciccia, among others.

In 1942, the Colina cinema theatre was inaugurated in Miraflores, where plays such as Nora by Hortensia Luna de la Puente were performed.

These advances denoted a golden age in the middle of the century, in which the participation of the first actors who contributed to contemporary theatre, Luis Álvarez and Ricardo Roca Rey, stands out. In the dramatic genre, works such as El rabdomante by Sebastián Salazar Bondy and Atusparia by Julio Ramón Ribeyro stand out. Another playwright, Enrique Solari Swayne, published Collacocha, whose setting was a mine. Simultaneously, the so-called "black theatre" appeared. with the work Espantapájaros by Victoria Santa Cruz; Victoria was the director of the Cumanana theatre company founded by her brother Nicomedes.

=== 21st century ===
The theatre has diversified by independent movements, with shows appealing to a wider audience. Modern related shows include circuses and puppet shows. The latter first settled in the country with the arrival of the Italian Union company in 1800.

== See also ==
- Peruvian art
- Culture of Peru
- Peruvian literature

== Bibliography ==
=== Primary sources ===
- Moncloa y Covarrubias, Manuel [in Spanish] (1905). Diccionario teatral del Perú (in Spanish). Lit. y Tip. de Badiola y Berrio. pp. 191–196. OCLC 1031655366.
- Moncloa y Covarrubias, Manuel [in Spanish] (1909). El teatro de Lima: apuntes históricos (con motivo de la inauguración del Teatro municipal) (in Spanish). Librería é imprenta Gil. OCLC 1142467063.
- Laos, Cipriano A. (1927). Lima "La ciudad de los virreyes": (el libro peruano) (in Spanish). Editorial Perú. pp. 80–98. OCLC 55387767.
- De la Fuente Chávez, Germán (1935). "Los espectáculos públicos". Lima en el IV centenario de su fundación. Editorial "Minerva". pp. 729–733.
- Delgado, Luis Humberto (1938). "El teatro peruano en la colonia y en la república". Comentarios históricos (in Spanish). Vol. 1. American Express (El Comercio). pp. 17–37.
- Rengifo Carpio, David Carlos (2021). ¡Arriba el telón! Historia del teatro en Lima: del siglo XVI a inicios del siglo XX (PDF) (in Spanish) (1st ed.). Munilibros, Municipalidad Metropolitana de Lima. ISBN 978-9972-726-45-3. OCLC 1351938892.

=== Complementary sources ===
- Gibson, Percy (1963). Teatro peruano contemporaneo (in Spanish). Madrid: Aguilar. OCLC 956280053.
- Balta, Aída (2001). Historia general del teatro en el Perú (in Spanish). Escuela de Ciencias de la Comunicación, Universidad de San Martín de Porres. ISBN 9972-54-072-3. OCLC 47705542.
- Ministerio de Cultura de Perú (MINCUL); Agencia Española de Cooperación Internacional (AECI), eds. (2011). Atlas de infraestructura y patrimonio cultural de las Américas, Perú (PDF) (in Spanish) (1st ed.). Fundación Interamericana de Cultura y Desarrollo. pp. 132–145. ISBN 978-607-00-4877-7. OCLC 1025891551.
- Silva-Santisteban, Ricardo [in Spanish] (2000). Antología general del teatro peruano (in Spanish). Fondo editorial PUCP. ISBN 978-9972-42-549-3.
- Lohmann Villena, Guillermo; Günther Doering, Juan [in Spanish] (1992). Lima (in Spanish). Editorial MAPFRE. pp. 197–198. ISBN 84-7100-407-0. OCLC 28157476.
- Proaño-Gómez, Lola; Geirola, Gustavo (2015). "Teatro Peruano. Introducción histórico-cultural". Paraguay y Perú. Antología de teatro latinoamericano (1950–2007) (in Spanish). Vol. 10. Centro Latinoamericano de Creación e Investigación Teatral Buenos Aires. pp. 28–40.
- Rubin, Don (2013). "Peru". The World Encyclopedia of Contemporary Theatre (in Spanish). Vol. 2. Routledge, Taylor & Frances Group. pp. 363–376. doi:10.4324/9781315011165. ISBN 9781315011165.
- Ponce Peña, Jennifer Paola (2016). Centro metropolitano de arte dramático (in Spanish). Universidad Peruana de Ciencias Aplicadas.
- Von Bischoffshausen, Gustavo (2018). Teatro popular en Lima : zarzuelas, sainetes y revistas (1890–1945) (PDF) (in Spanish) (1st ed.). Estación La Cultura S.A.C. ISBN 978-612-47584-1-6. OCLC 1057895566.
