= Miss Perú 1956 =

- Date: July 9, 1956
- Presenters: Pepe Ludmir
- Venue: Teatro Municipal (Lima)
- Entrants: 15
- Winner: Dolores "Lola" Sabogal; Callao

The Miss Perú 1956 pageant was held on July 9, 1956. 15 candidates competed for the national crown that year. The chosen winner represented Peru at the Miss Universe 1956. The rest of the finalists would enter in different pageants. The winner was Dolores (Lola) Sabogal.

== Placements ==
| Final Results | Contestant |
|---|---|
| Miss Peru Universe 1956 | Callao - Dolores "Lola" Sabogal |
| 1st Runner-Up | Huánuco - Rosario Ponce |
| 2nd Runner-Up | Piura - Violeta Seminario |
| Top 7 | USA Perú - Edith Beck; Arequipa - Alicia Lizárraga; Moquegua - Nancy Eguren; Loreto - Elena Fateil |

== Special awards ==
- Miss Photogenic - Callao - Lola Sabogal
- Miss Elegance - Huánuco - Rosario Ponce
- Miss Congeniality - Amazonas - Luzmila Duarte

== Delegates ==
- Amazonas - Luzmila Duarte
- Apurímac - Edda Barbis
- Arequipa - Alicia Lizárraga
- Ayacucho - Teresa Villa
- Callao - Lola Sabogal
- Distrito Capital - Silvia Kessel
- Huánuco - Rosario Ponce
- Ica - Rosario Salcedo
- Loreto - Elena Fateil
- Madre de Dios - Chichi Santana
- Moquegua - Nancy Eguren
- Piura - Violeta Seminario
- San Martín - Maggie Seoane
- Tacna - Teresa García
- USA Perú - Edith Beck
