= Miss Perú 1971 =

Beauty pageant edition

- Date: July 12, 1971
- Presenters: Pepe Ludmir
- Venue: Teatro Municipal (Lima)
- Broadcaster: Panamericana Televisión
- Entrants: 24
- Winner: Magnolia Martínez; Distrito Capital

The Miss Perú 1971 pageant was 18th edition of miss perú pageant held on July 12, 1971. That year, 24 candidates were competing for the national crown. The chosen winner represented Peru at the Miss Universe 1971. The rest of the finalists would enter in different pageants.

== Placements ==
Final Results	Contestant
Miss Peru Universe 1971	Distrito Capital – Magnolia Martínez
1st Runner-Up	Ica - Inés Carbajal
2nd Runner-Up	Tumbes - Susanna Grundel
Top 6	San Martín - Katty Acker; Lambayeque - Lucy Arrascue; Junín - Marilú de Cossío
Top 10	Arequipa - Maria Teresa Arellano; Europe Perú - Isabel James Rossi; Madre de Dios - Maria Sosa; Amazonas - Sonia Vivanco

== Special awards ==
- Best Regional Costume - Lambayeque - Lucy Arrascue
- Miss Photogenic - San Martín - Katty Acker
- Miss Congeniality - Distrito Capital - Magnolia Martínez
- Miss Elegance - Lambayeque - Lucy Arrascue
- Miss Body - Ica - Inés Carbajal

== Delegates ==
- Amazonas - Sonia Vivanco
- Áncash - Karla Fernandez
- Apurímac - Paulina Cornejo
- Arequipa - Maria Teresa Arellano
- Ayacucho - Maria Luisa Villa
- Cajamarca - Cynthia Hernandez
- Cuzco - Leonela Mansilla
- Distrito Capital - Magnolia Martínez
- Europe Perú - Isabel James Rossi
- Huancavelica - Rosalinda García
- Huánuco - Sabrina Slavich
- Ica - Inés Carbajal
- Junín - Marilú de Cossío
- Lambayeque - Lucy Arrascue
- Loreto - Pamela Diaz
- Madre de Dios - Maria Sosa
- Moquegua - Ana Lucia León
- Pasco - Fanny Muller
- Piura - Cristina Gutierrez
- Puno - Dina Mercedes Costa
- San Martín - Katty Acker
- Tacna - Maria Rafaela Ruiz
- Tumbes - Susanna Grundel
- USA Peru - Mariella Fauntleroy
