= Miss Perú 1958 =

- Date: July 5, 1958
- Presenters: Pepe Ludmir
- Venue: Teatro Municipal (Lima)
- Entrants: 16
- Winner: Beatriz Boluarte; Lima Region

The Miss Perú 1958 pageant was 4th edition held on July 5, 1958. That year, 16 candidates were competing for the national crown. The winner represented Peru at the Miss Universe 1958. The rest of the finalists would enter different pageants.

== Placements ==
| Final Results | Contestant |
|---|---|
| Miss Peru Universe 1958 | Region Lima - Beatriz Boluarte |
| 1st Runner-Up | Distrito Capital - Beatriz Dulanto |
| 2nd Runner-Up | Tacna - Teresa Rubina |
| Top 7 | Amazonas - Silvia Salinas; Piura - Nannie Berendson; La Libertad - Martha Mantilla; Callao - Techy Hurtado |

== Special awards ==
- Best Regional Costume - Apurímac - Marilú Alvarez
- Miss Photogenic - Tacna - Teresa Rubina
- Miss Congeniality - Tumbes - Irma Málaga
- Miss Elegance - Distrito Capital - Beatriz Dulanto

.

== Delegates ==
- Amazonas - Silvia Salinas
- Apurímac - Marilú Alvarez
- Cajamarca - Victoria Pilcon
- Callao - Techy Hurtado
- Distrito Capital - Beatriz Dulanto
- Ica - Gladys Carbajal
- Junín - Doris Castro
- La Libertad - Martha Mantilla
- Loreto - Violeta López
- Moquegua - Rebeca Romero
- Piura - Nannie Berendson
- Puno - Catty Arteaga
- Region Lima - Beatriz Boluarte
- Tacna - Teresa Rubina
- Tumbes - Irma Málaga
- USA Peru - Claudia Orson

.
