= Teatro Rojas =

Coordinates: 39.8578°N 4.0226°W

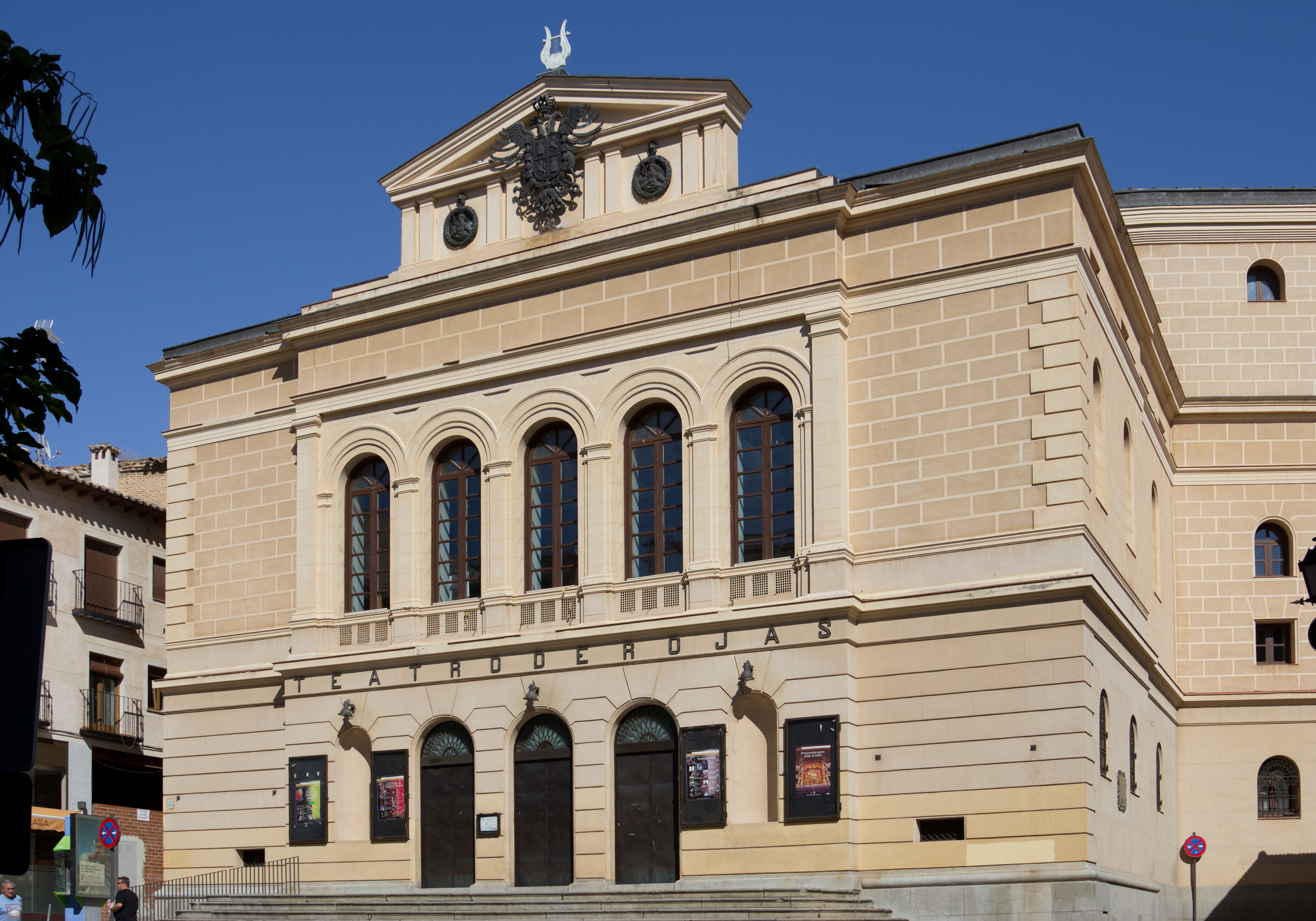
Principal façade

The Teatro Rojas is a theater in the city of Toledo, Castile-La Mancha, Spain, inaugurated in 1879 on the site of the old corral de comedias, Mesón de la Fruta. Its construction involved several architects, and it is named after the local playwright Francisco de Rojas.

== Construction ==
The initial design for the theater was created by municipal architect Luis Antonio Fenech, who submitted the plans and accompanying documents to the city council in 1866. That same year, the demolition of the previous coliseum, located at the Mesón de la Fruta and formerly a corral de comedias, began. Following Fenech's death, Ramiro Amador de los Ríos, son of José Amador de los Ríos, was appointed municipal architect and immediately took charge of completing the demolition of the old theater.

Building on Fenech's original layout, which positioned the main façade towards the square and aligned the hall and the stage along the site’s long axis, Amador de los Ríos introduced several innovations. He added more staircases, improved the layout of the hall by giving it a more open horseshoe shape, adjusted the gradient and arrangement of the different floors, and enhanced ventilation through the ceiling of the hall.

In the following years, three more architects succeeded Amador de los Ríos, though none altered the existing design.

The theater was officially inaugurated on October 19, 1879, with a performance of Francisco de Rojas's honor drama, Del Rey abajo ninguno.

== Interior ==
The ceiling paintings feature Thalia, the muse of theatre, along with a series of medallions depicting great authors of Spanish theatre, such as Tirso de Molina, Calderón de la Barca, and Francisco de Rojas, after whom the theater is named.

The parapets of the box seats, the slender iron columns, the stage opening flanked by proscenium boxes, and the spectacular front curtain all contribute to making this auditorium a significant example of 19th-century Spanish municipal theater design.
