= Miss Perú 1997 =

- Date: April 1, 1997
- Presenters: Omar Fierro & Karina Rivera
- Venue: Teatro Municipal, Lima
- Broadcaster: América Televisión
- Entrants: 24
- Placements: 12
- Winner: Claudia Doph; Ancash

The Miss Perú 1997 pageant was held on April 1, 1997. That year, 24 candidates were competing for the national crown. The chosen winner represented Peru at the Miss Universe 1997. The rest of the finalists would enter in different pageants.

== Placements ==
Final Results	Contestant
Miss Peru Universe 1997	Ancash - Claudia Doph
1st Runner-Up	Madre de Dios - Andrea Suito
2nd Runner-Up	Ayacucho - Elvira Villa
3rd Runner-Up	Cajamarca - Samantha Elie Retes
4th Runner-Up	Amazonas - Andrea Montenegro
Top 12	Moquegua - Olga Medina; Arequipa - Grethel Soza; Loreto - Estrella Lizárraga; La Libertad - Paola Rubio; Puno - Claudia Sala; Piura- Tatiana Velasco; Distrito Capital - Giuliana Ventura

== Special awards ==
- Best Regional Costume - Amazonas - Andrea Montenegro
- Miss Photogenic - Madre de Dios - Andrea Suito
- Miss Elegance - Cajamarca - Samantha Elie Retes
- Miss Body - Loreto - Estrella Lizárraga
- Best Hair - Arequipa - Grethel Soza
- Miss Congeniality - Ucayali - Gisela Fuentes
- Most Beautiful Face - Madre de Dios - Andrea Suito
- Miss Internet - Amazonas - Andrea Montenegro

== Delegates ==
- Amazonas - Andrea Montenegro
- Áncash - Claudia Doph
- Apurímac - Delly Madrid
- Arequipa - Grethel Soza
- Ayacucho - Elvira Villa
- Cajamarca - Samantha Elie Retes
- Cuzco - Paloma La Hoz
- Distrito Capital - Giuliana Ventura
- Huancavelica - Fiorella Vismara
- Huánuco - Ariela Olavarría
- Ica - Betzabeth Aedo
- Junín - Marta Andersen
- La Libertad - Paola Rubio
- Lambayeque - Maritza Menchola
- Loreto - Estrella Lizárraga
- Madre de Dios - Andrea Suito
- Moquegua - Olga Medina
- Pasco - Juliette Salomón
- Piura - Tatiana Velasco
- Puno - Claudia Sala
- San Martín - Úrsula Zevallos
- Tacna - María Teresa Linares
- Tumbes - María Elena Hoyos
- Ucayali - Gisela Fuentes

== Judges ==
- Marisol Crousillat - Production Manager of América Televisión
- Irma Vargas Fuller - Coord. of Misses del Perú Organization
- Javier Blanco - Regional Manager of San Antonio (Mineral water)
- Norka Peralta del Águila - Peruvian Designer
- Angel Tacchino - News Anchorman & TV Journalist
- Benjamin Kreimer - Former President of Miss Peru Org.

== Miss World Peru ==
The Miss World Peru 1997 pageant was held on May 25, 1997, That year, 22 candidates from the regions of Peru were competing for the national crown. The show host by Antonio Vodanovic and Jessica Newton, from "El Pueblo Resort & Convention Center" hotel and were live broadcast by Frecuencia Latina. The chosen winner represented Peru at Miss World 1997. The rest of the finalists would enter in different pageants.

== Placements ==
Final Results	Contestant
Miss World Peru 1997	Amazonas - Claudia Luque Barrantes
Miss International Peru 1997	Ancash - Ana Matallana Illich
Miss Peru Asia-Pacific 1997	Huánuco - Maia Larrañaga
1st Runner-Up	Puno - Mariana Bedoya Berckely
2nd Runner-Up	Tumbes - Alejandra Barbosa
3rd Runner-Up	Tacna - Veronica Bustamante
Top 12	Ucayali - Milena Chavarri; Piura- Geraldine Cateriano; Arequipa - Maria Angela Quesada; San Martín - Lisette Mathey; Ayacucho - Ana Maria Zimic; Madre de Dios - Ingrid Pizarro

== MWP Special Awards ==
- Miss Photogenic - Amazonas - Claudia Luque
- Miss Fitness - Amazonas - Claudia Luque
- Miss Elegance - Puno - Mariana Bedoya
- Best Hair - Tumbes - Alejandra Barbosa
- Miss Body - Ancash - Ana Matallana Illich
- Most Beautiful Face - Puno - Mariana Bedoya

== MWP Delegates ==
- Amazonas - Claudia Luque
- Áncash - Ana Matallana Illich
- Apurímac - Vanessa Sommerkamp
- Arequipa - Maria Angela Quesada
- Ayacucho - Ana Maria Zimic
- Cajamarca - Roxana Basauri
- Callao - Claudia Torres
- Cuzco - Raquel de Ugarte
- Huánuco - Maia Larrañaga
- Ica - Julia Elena Avalos
- Junín - Ursula Cervantes
- Lambayeque - Nayfi Ruiz
- Loreto - Viviana Rengifo
- Madre de Dios - Ingrid Pizarro
- Moquegua - Angie Kaliman
- Pasco - Janis Valdivia
- Piura - Geraldine Cateriano
- Puno - Mariana Bedoya
- San Martín - Lisette Mathey
- Tacna - Veronica Bustamante
- Tumbes - Alejandra Barbosa
- Ucayali - Milena Chavarri

== MWP Judges ==
- Jaime Andrade - Mitsubishi Motors Representative Director
- Astrid Carolina Herrera - Miss World 1984
- Eleazar Molina - Jewel Designer
- María Teresa Braschi - Peruvian Tv Host
- Carlos Morales - Public Relations Manager of Grupo D' elite
- Paola Dellepiane - Miss Peru 1995
- Dr. Max Álvarez - Plastic Surgeon
- Miguel Velazco - Regional Director of Quimica Suiza S.A
- Jackeline Aguilera - Miss World 1995
- Jack Abugattas - Fashion Designer

== MWP Background Music ==
- Opening Show – Miss World Peru Anthem (composed by Coco Tafur)
- Swimsuit Competition - Glenn Miller - In The Mood
- Evening Gown Competition – Oasis - Wonderwall & Champagne Supernova - (Piano Cover)
