= Miss Perú 1960 =

- Date: June 28, 1960
- Presenters: Pepe Ludmir
- Venue: Teatro Municipal (Lima)
- Entrants: 16
- Winner: Medallit Gallino; Lambayeque

The Miss Perú 1960 pageant was held on June 28, 1960. Sixteen candidates competed for the two national crowns. The chosen winners represented Peru at the Miss Universe 1960 and, for the first time, at Miss International 1960. The rest of the finalists would enter different pageants.

== Placements ==
Final Results	Contestant
Miss Peru Universe 1960	Lambayeque - Medallit Gallino
Miss International Peru 1960	Distrito Capital - Irma Vargas Fuller
1st Runner-Up	Ica - Maricruz Gómez Díaz
2nd Runner-Up	Huancavelica - Jenny Cano
Top 8	Ayacucho - Carmen De La Torre Ramírez; Piura - Olga Lanfranco; Huánuco - Elena Barreda; Amazonas - Lilian Revilla

== Special awards ==
- Miss Photogenic - Distrito Capital - Irma Vargas Fuller
- Miss Congeniality - Tacna - Alina Amado
- Miss Elegance - Ica - Maricruz Gómez

.

== Delegates ==
- Amazonas - Lilian Revilla
- Áncash - Luz Freire
- Ayacucho - Carmen Estela De La Torre Ramirez
- Cuzco - Antonieta Martínez
- Distrito Capital - Irma Vargas Fuller
- Huancavelica - Jennifer Cano
- Huánuco - Elena Barreda
- Ica - Maricruz Gómez Díaz
- La Libertad - Ana Parker
- Lambayeque - Medallit Gallino
- Loreto - Raquel Muro
- Piura - Olga Lanfranco
- San Martín - Silvia Arteaga
- Tacna - Alina Amado del Pozo
- Tumbes - Maricarmen Barone
- USA Perú - Molly Watson
