= 2015 Nigerian House of Representatives elections in the Federal Capital Territory =

Federal Capital Territory elections, Nigeria

The 2015 Nigerian House of Representatives elections in Federal Capital Territory was held on March 28, 2015, to elect members of the House of Representatives to represent Federal Capital Territory, Nigeria.

== Overview ==
Affiliation	Party		Total
Affiliation	APC	PDP	Total
Before Election	-	2	2
After Election	1	1	2

== Summary ==
District	Incumbent	Party	Elected Senator	Party
Abaji/Gwagwalada/Kwali/Kuje	Isah Egah Dobi	PDP	Angulu Zakari Yamma	APC
Amac/Bwari	Zaphaniah Jisalo	PDP	Zaphaniah Jisalo	PDP

== Results ==
=== Abaji/Gwagwalada/Kwali/Kuje ===
Party candidates registered with the Independent National Electoral Commission to contest in the election. APC candidate Angulu Zakari Yamma won the election, defeating PDP Danladi Etsu Zhin and other party candidates.

2015 Nigerian House of Representatives election in Federal Capital Territory
Party	Candidate	Votes	%
APC	Angulu Zakari Yamma	14,486	
PDP	Danladi Etsu Zhin	12,431	
Total votes			
APC hold			

=== Amac/Bwari ===
Party candidates registered with the Independent National Electoral Commission to contest in the election. PDP candidate Zaphaniah Jisalo won the election.

2015 Nigerian House of Representatives election in Federal Capital Territory
Party	Candidate	Votes	%
PDP	Zaphaniah Jisalo		
Total votes			
PDP hold			
