= Miss Perú 1981 =

- Date: June 27, 1981
- Presenters: Jorge Beleván
- Venue: Teatro Municipal, Lima
- Broadcaster: Panamericana Televisión
- Entrants: 18
- Winner: Gladys Silva; Lima Region

The Miss Perú 1981 pageant was held on June 27, 1981. That year, 18 candidates were competing for the national crown. The chosen winner represented Peru at the Miss Universe 1981. The rest of the finalists would enter in different pageants.

== Placements ==
Final Results	Contestant
Miss Peru Universe 1981	Region Lima - Gladys Silva
Miss Peru Playa 1981	Lambayeque - Lucila Boggiano
1st Runner-Up	Moquegua - Lorena Castro
2nd Runner-Up	Tacna - Patricia Calderón Mickle
Top 8	Piura - Carolina Seminario; Ucayali - Patricia Hart; San Martín - Karin Bartra; Amazonas - Patricia Heller

== Special awards ==
- Best Regional Costume - La Libertad - Marylin Vega
- Miss Photogenic - Lambayeque - Lucila Boggiano
- Miss Elegance - Tacna - Patricia Calderón
- Miss Body - Moquegua - Lorena Castro
- Best Hair - Piura - Carolina Seminario
- Miss Congeniality - Junín - Emma Ugarte
- Most Beautiful Face - Lambayeque - Lucila Boggiano

.

== Delegates ==
- Amazonas - Patricia Heller
- Apurímac - Elena Serra
- Cajamarca - María Soledad Mariátegui
- Callao - Marilú Choza Balarezo
- Cuzco - Claudia Farfan Kilian
- Europe Perú - Carolina Kecskemeti
- Huancavelica - Julia Flores Cosme
- Junín - Emma Ugarte
- La Libertad - Marylin Vega Esparza
- Lambayeque - Lucila Boggiano
- Loreto - Concepcion Pineda
- Madre de Dios - Giuliana Martinetti
- Moquegua - Lorena Castro
- Piura - Carolina Seminario
- Region Lima - Gladys Silva
- San Martín - Karin Bartra
- Tacna - Patricia Calderón Mickle
- Ucayali - Patricia Hart
