= La Casa Ida =

La Casa Ida was a medialab and cultural center active between 2006 and 2014 in Lima, Peru, focused on research, production and education in technological artistic practices. It was founded by a group of contemporary artists led by architect, electronic arts researcher and professor Alvaro Pastor.

== Work ==
Its lines of work included research on the relations between artists and computers, education and training on electronic art, support for artistic production and exhibition of experimental audiovisual arts, and promotion of access to open-source technologies for cultural production and innovation. Located at iconic La Colmena Avenue in the old city center, La Casa Ida offered a multimedia computer lab, audiovisual production and post-production facilities, a residency area for artists and researchers, and gallery and music exhibition spaces. Since 2008 its institutional website became a publishing platform for experimental and electronic music. In 2011 La Casa Ida founded Instituto Arte Electronica (Electronic Arts Institute) concerned about developing an educational program in electronic arts and technologies with a pedagogical approach that sought to balance academic knowledge, non-standardized and traditional knowledge of Latin America. This context initiated Alexandra a free digital library project that provides selected resources for research in digital technologies and humanities. Besides exhibition and educative activities La Casa Ida advocated with Peruvian government institutions for cultural and educational policies encompassing open-source and creative uses of open source technologies. Among the most important projects generated we find Culturalima a collaborative information system on cultural ecosystems created in 2012 and adopted by the Ministry of Culture (Peru) since 2013 under the name Infoartes. The Electronic Arts National Forum ARTEC a yearly event which from 2009 to 2012 brought together national and international artists and digital humanities and technology experts, for debate, interchange and exhibition. From 2011 through 2013 La Casa Ida carried out Pantalla Urbana (Urban screen) pop-up Video mapping periodic exhibitions on emblematic buildings.

During its active years La Casa Ida established links and collaborations with worldwide organizations, researchers, activists and artists such as: Alta Tecnología Andina ATA, Aloardi Record Label, MALI Art Museum of Lima, Canada Council for the Arts, Contemporary Art Museum of Lima MAC, Instituto Cultural Peruano Norteamericano, Discos Invisibles Record Label, Escuelab, Etopia Centro de Arte y Tecnología, Iberescena, Ibermusicas, Iberotec, International Festival of Video and Electronic Art in Lima, ISONAR Sound Research Group from Universidad San Martín de Porres, Art critic Jorge Villacorta, Ministry of Culture in Peru, Municipal Theater of Lima, National School of Fine Arts ENSABAP, Organization of Ibero-American States, OTELO - Offenes Technologielabor, Pro Helvetia, Scant Intone Record Label, Spanish Agency for International Development Cooperation AECID, V2 Institute for Unstable Media among others.
