= Miss Perú 1970 =

- Date: June 12, 1970
- Presenters: Pepe Ludmir
- Venue: Teatro Municipal (Lima)
- Broadcaster: Panamericana Televisión
- Entrants: 24
- Winner: Cristina Málaga Butrón; Arequipa

The Miss Perú 1970 pageant was 15th edition of miss Peru pageant held on June 12, 1970. That year, 24 candidates were competing for the national crown. The chosen winner represented Peru at the Miss Universe 1970. The rest of the finalists would enter in different pageants.

== Placements ==
Final Results	Contestant
Miss Peru Universe 1970	Arequipa – Cristina Málaga Butrón
1st Runner-Up	Cuzco - Pocha Cárdenas
2nd Runner-Up	Amazonas - María Arias
Top 6	Ayacucho - Gloria Rivera Bedoya; Pasco - Ana María Landazuri; Puno - Maricarmen Velando
Top 10	San Martín - Rosa Barragán; Moquegua - Martha de la Jara; Ancash - María Inés Malpica; Loreto - Cunny Ferreyros

== Special awards ==
- Best Regional Costume - Lambayeque - Olivia Avalos
- Miss Photogenic - Amazonas - María Arias
- Miss Elegance - Moquegua - Martha de la Jara
- Miss Body - Cuzco - Pocha Cárdenas
- Best Hair - Pasco - Ana María Landazuri
- Miss Congeniality - Ancash - María Inés Malpica
- Most Beautiful Face - Amazonas - María Arias

== Delegates ==
- Amazonas - María Arias
- Áncash - María Inés Malpica
- Apurímac - Celia Florian
- Arequipa - Cristina Málaga Butrón
- Ayacucho - Gloria Rivera Bedoya
- Asia Perú - Yazmin Lau
- Cajamarca - Monica Estrada
- Cuzco - Pocha Cárdenas
- Europe Perú - Isabel James Rossi
- Huancavelica - Rebeca Arenas
- Huánuco - Andrea Sierra
- Ica - Tina Vargas Armandi
- Junín - Mercedes Sanchez Mercado
- Lambayeque - Olivia Avalos
- Loreto - Cunny Ferreyros
- Madre de Dios - Silvia Vasconcelos
- Moquegua - Martha de la Jara
- Pasco - Ana María Landazuri
- Puno - Maria del Carmen Velando
- Region Lima - Lucía Luna
- San Martín - Rosa Barragán
- Tacna - Gabriela Reyes Retana
- Tumbes - Maria Luisa Zuniga
- USA Perú - Adelaida 'Lala' Parker
