= Corral de comedias de Alcalá de Henares =

Theatre in the Community of Madrid, Spain

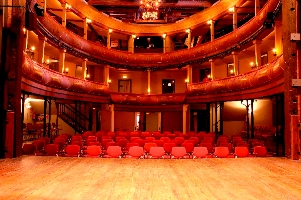
- 1602
- Interactive map of Corral de comedias de Alcalá de Henares
- Address: Plaza de Cervantes, 14; Alcalá de Henares; Spain
- Coordinates: 40.482303°N 3.364571°W
- Operator: Fundación Teatro La Abadía
- Capacity: 200

Construction
- Rebuilt: 1769
- Architect: Francisco Sánchez

Website
- http://www.corraldealcala.com

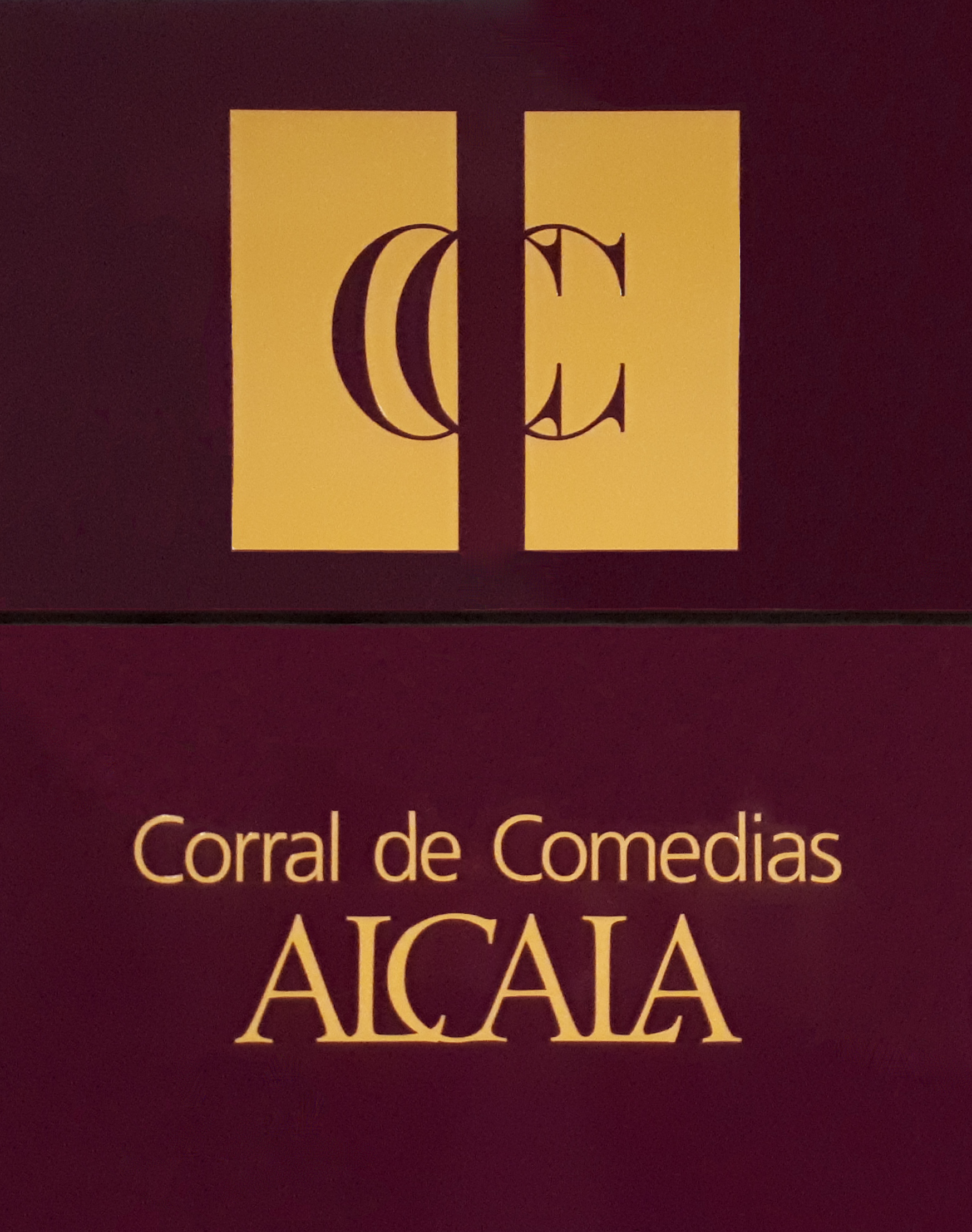
Logo

Corral de Comedias de Alcalá de Henares in Alcalá de Henares, Community of Madrid, Spain, is one of the oldest preserved theatres in Europe. Built in 1601–02 and designed to mirror the Corral de la Cruz in Madrid, the architect was Francisco Sánchez.

It was built as a corral de comedias, a courtyard theatre. However, it is no longer an open-air theater, like the Corral de comedias de Almagro, having been given a roof in a rebuilding in 1769. Following its use as a teatro romántico in the 19th century, and a cinema in the early 20th century, which led to major changes in the building's architecture, the building has been restored.

== Current use ==
The corral is in active use as a theatre and seats 200 people. Since 2005 it has been administered by the Fundación Teatro La Abadía.

== Bibliography ==
- Coso Marín, Miguel Ángel; Higuera Sánchez-Pardo, Mercedes; Sanz Ballesteros, Juan (1989). El Teatro Cervantes de Alcalá de Henares, 1602-1866: estudio y documentos (in Spanish). Tamesis Books. ISBN 978-0-7293-0310-1.
- Fothergill-Payne, Louise; Fothergill-Payne, Peter (1991). Parallel Lives: Spanish and English National Drama, 1580-1680. Bucknell University Press. ISBN 978-0-8387-5194-7.
