= Teatro Segura =

Theatre and concert hall in Lima, Peru

Coordinates: 12.0473°S 77.0345°W

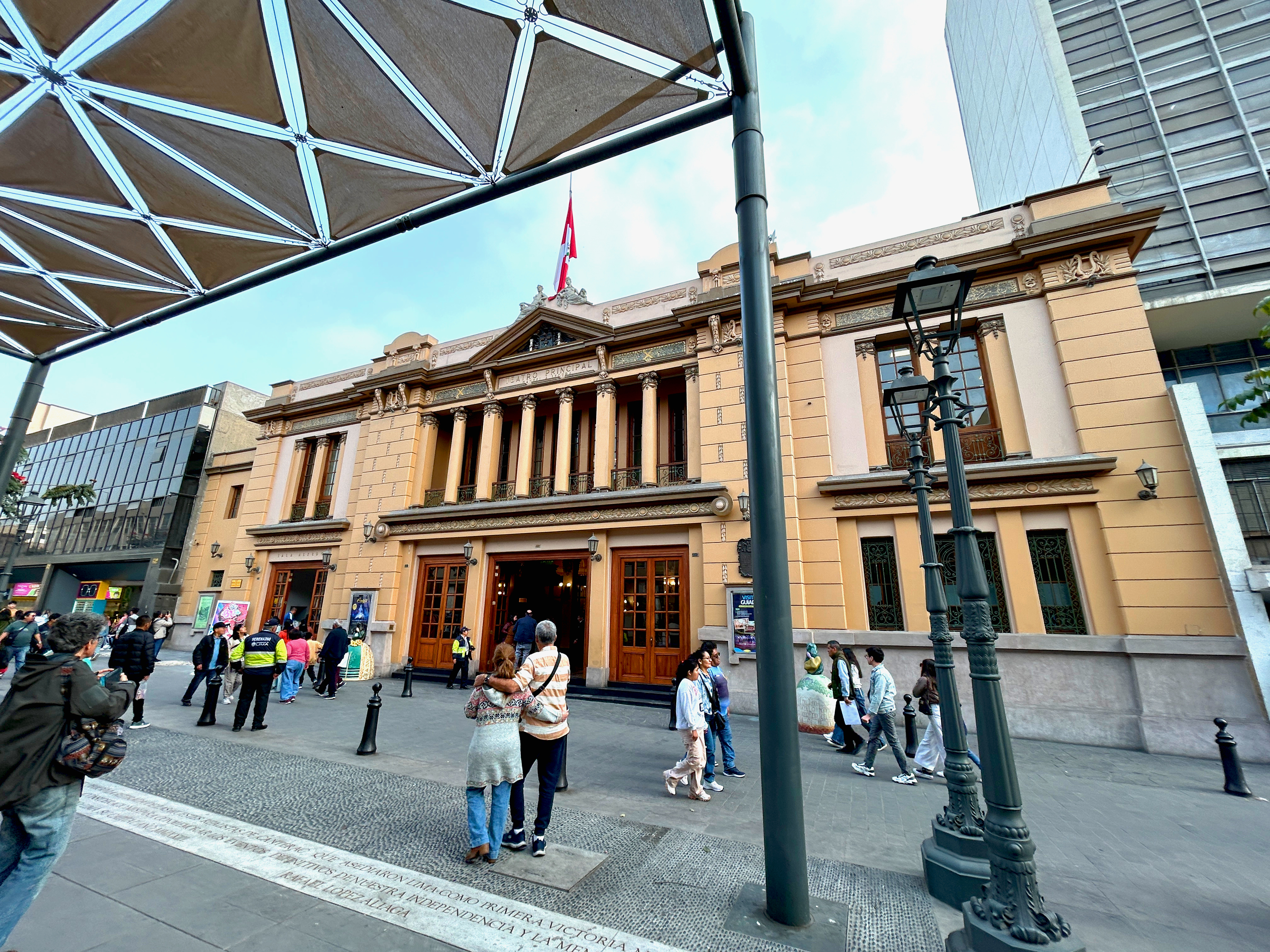
Façade of the theater.

The Teatro Manuel Ascencio Segura is a theatre and concert hall located in the Jirón Huancavelica of Lima, Peru. First built in 1615, it is considered the oldest theatre in Latin America.

== History ==
In 1615 an open-air theatre (Corral de comedias) was built on the same spot where the Teatro Segura is located. This original open-air theatre was destroyed by an earthquake on 1746 and rebuilt a year later. The theatre was later reformed on 1822 and 1874. The actual construction was built in 1909 under the name of "Teatro Municipal". The name was changed in 1929 to "Teatro Manuel Ascencio Segura", after the Teatro Municipal de Lima was bought by the Municipality of Lima.

== See also ==
- Municipal Theatre Museum, located next to the theatre
