= Culturalima =

Culturalima, also known as Network of Cultures of Lima or Network of Cultural Centres of Lima, was a geolocated cultural information system authored by architect Alvaro Pastor in 2012 for La Casa Ida Cultural Association in Lima.

== History ==
Culturalima became operational in June 2013 and remained active until June 2017 bringing together 143 institutional partners. Its objective was to identify and promote Lima's cultural assets and resources by offering an online platform that combined user collaboration and automatic selection of relevant social network information. Another contribution of Culturalima was the notion of Cultural Ecosystem to acknowledge the relations between the material and non-material cultural elements and practices that assemble in a geographical region and extended this metaphor to include the cultural dynamics of cyberspace.

Culturalima's theoretical and technological framework along with its partial results were presented at the XIV Digital Cities Forum in April 2013 in Quito at V Iberoamerican Culture Congress in November 2013 in Zaragoza, and at the OAS HASTAC Humanities, Arts, Sciences and Technology Alliance and Collaboratory in April 2014 in Lima. Since 2015 part of Culturalima project was adopted by the Ministry of Culture (Peru) under the name Infoartes. With a nationwide reach, the number of its affiliates has increased to 215.
