= Plaza Mayor, Almagro =

Town square in Almagro, Spain

Coordinates: 38°53′19″N 3°42′43″W

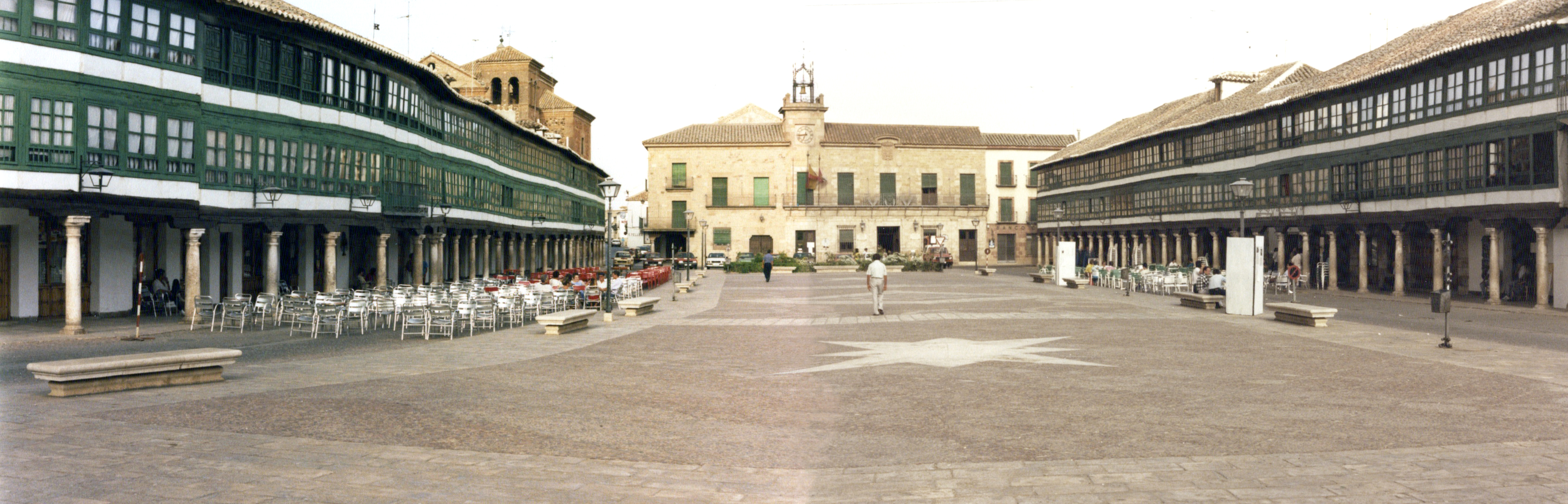

Plaza Mayor de Almagro is a town square located in the city of Almagro, Castile-La Mancha, Spain. Amalgro is designated a conjunto histórico (a heritage listing), and the square is of architectural interest. It is the location of the city hall and a historic theatre, the Corral de comedias de Almagro. Amalgro is a name of Arabic origin (المغرة , al-magra) referring to the local red clay, which is one of the materials used in the plaza mayor. Probably the settlement began as a small Muslim castle, possibly on the site now occupied by the hermitage of San Juan. The fief was bestowed on Gonzalo Yáñez de Noboa, ninth Grand Master of the Order of Calatrava, after the Battle of the Navas de Tolosa, and the grant was confirmed by Ferdinand III in 1222. Amalgro became an important centre for the Order of Calatrava and the area which became known as Campo de Calatrava.

The medieval plaza mayor was redeveloped by the Fugger family, German bankers who under Charles V acquired considerable possessions in Spain and its empire. During the 16th and 17th centuries they had concessions on mines in La Mancha, including the important mercury mines of Almadén, in return for loans to the Spanish government. It was under their influence that the architecture of the square took on its present form with the distinctive galleries along two sides.

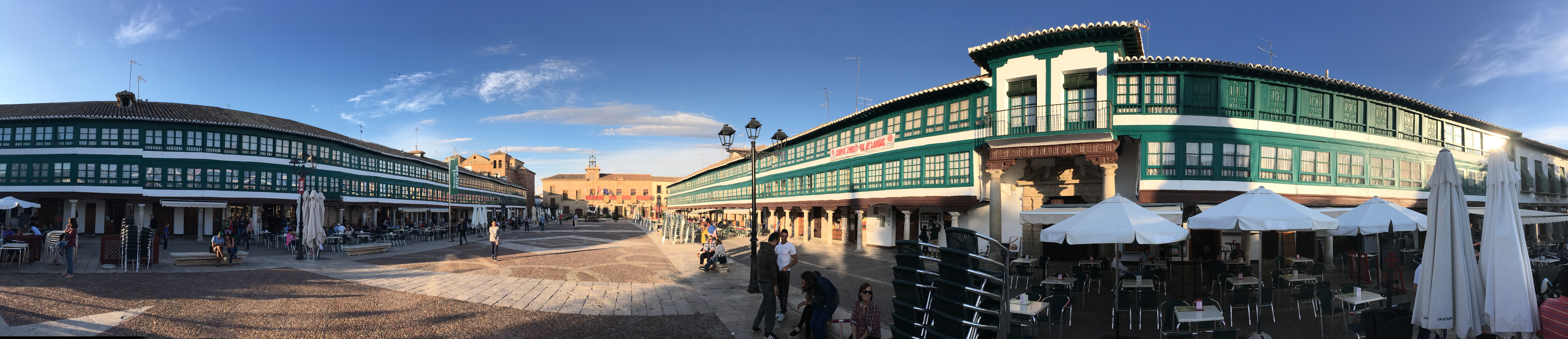
Panorama.
