= Casa Grau Naval Museum =

Museum in Peru

- Museo Naval Casa Grau
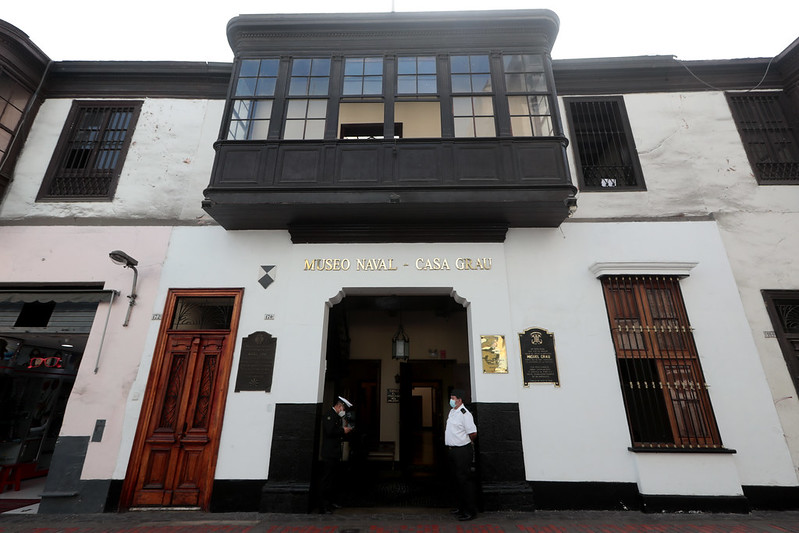
- Established: 27 July 1984
- Location: Jirón Huancavelica 170/172
- Coordinates: 12.0475°S 77.0333°W
- Type: House museum
- Director: Yerka Guerrero
- Website: Peruvian Navy website

The Casa Grau Naval Museum (Spanish: Museo Naval Casa Grau) is a house museum located in the first floor of the house where Miguel Grau and his family lived for 12 years, at Jirón Huancavelica 170, part of the historic centre of Lima, Peru.

== History ==
The 18th-century building with a prominent balcony was originally inhabited by Peruvian war hero Miguel Grau along with his wife Dolores Cabero Núñez and their children between 1867 and 1879. Grau and his family inhabited the second floor, while his sister, María Dolores Ruperta Grau, inhabited the first. After Grau's death, his sister's family took care of his ten children, with the exception of her husband, colonel Manuel Gómez, who was killed in action during the battle of Miraflores.

In 1984, the Pontifical Catholic University of Peru ceded the building's second floor and the museum was inaugurated on July 27 of the same year. Later, in 1997, the first floor was also ceded to the museum.

Inside, Grau's personal objects are permanently displayed, in environments decorated according to the period, as well as the replica of the seat he occupied when he was deputy for Paita. In turn, the museum has pieces that narrate some of the naval battles that the Chilean and Peruvian navies fought during the War of the Pacific, which faced both countries between 1879 and 1883.

== See also ==
- Miguel Grau
