= Jirón Huancavelica =

Street in Lima, Peru

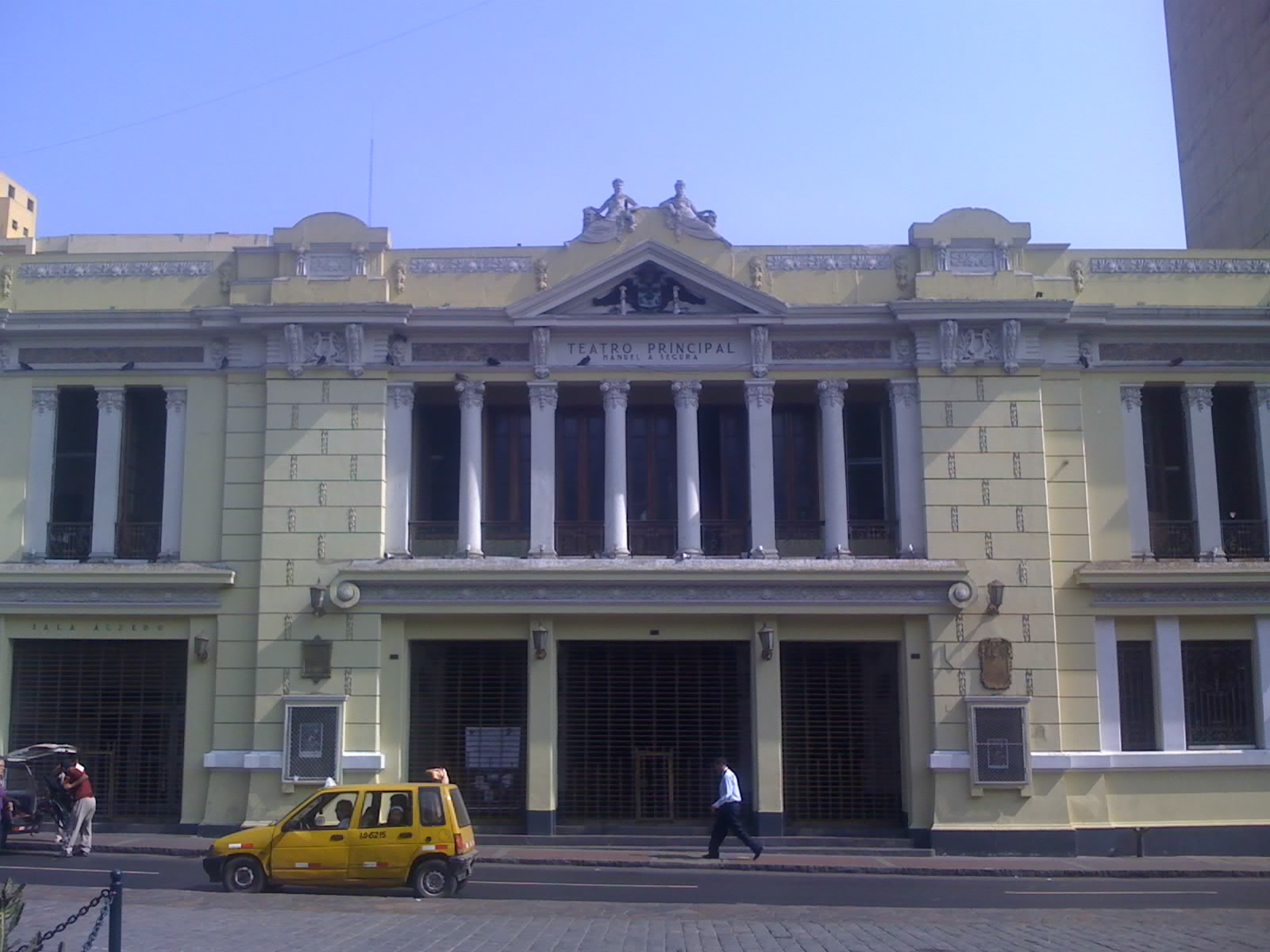
- Segura Theatre in the street's second block
- Part of: Damero de Pizarro
- Namesake: Department of Huancavelica
- From: Jirón Ramón Cárcano
- Major junctions: Tacna Avenue, Alfonso Ugarte Avenue
- To: Jirón de la Unión

Construction
- Completion: 1535

Jirón Huancavelica is a major street in the Damero de Pizarro, located in the historic centre of Lima, Peru. The street starts at its intersection with the Jirón de la Unión and continues until it reaches Jirón Ramón Cárcano.

== History ==
The road that today constitutes the street was laid by Francisco Pizarro when he founded the city of Lima on 18 January 1535. Since the end of the 16th century, a Corral de comedias existed on the street. In 1615, the first venue was built, which was destroyed by an earthquake in 1746. Since then, the venue has undergone several renovations and is now known as the Segura Theatre.

According to oral tradition, in 1651 an Angolan slave painted an image of the crucified Jesus Christ in a brotherhood of his caste in the Pachacamilla neighbourhood, where this street extends. An earthquake that occurred shortly after ruined the house, leaving only the wall that had the figure on it unscathed. In 1660, resident Andrés de León decided to build a small chapel for the worship of said image. However, as the ecclesiastical chapter of Lima did not consider the site decent, it ordered the destruction of the chapel and image. Given this, the site was acquired by the Biscayan captain Sebastián de Antuñano y Rivas who erected a temple for the veneration of the Holy Christ of Miracles as he began to be called. In 1730 the first church of the Sanctuary and Monastery of Las Nazarenas was built and in 1746 it was rebuilt because it was destroyed during an earthquake. The church is now the location of the cult of the Lord of Miracles.

In 1821, José de San Martín proclaimed the independence of Peru in the Plazoleta de la Merced, located in the first block of this road.

In 1862, when the new urban nomenclature was adopted, the road was renamed Jirón Huancavelica after the Department of Huancavelica. Prior to this renaming, each block (cuadra) had a unique name:

- Block 1: Lezcano, after Pedro de Lezcano Centeno y Valdez, who lived there.
- Block 2: Siete de Septiembre, changed from its original name of Coliseo to commemorate the arrival of San Martín to Paracas Bay, later known as the Plazuela del Teatro after the Segura Theatre.
- Block 3: Ortiz, after an unidentified neighbour of the same name.
- Block 4: Nazarenas, after the sanctuary of the same name.
- Block 5: Plazuela de Nazarenas, for the same reason.
- Block 6: Caballos, after a horse rental service there.
- Block 7: Torrecilla, after a structure of the same name in the property of Conquistador Jerónimo de Aliaga.

At the end of the 19th century, the road housed the home of Miguel Grau, who died during the War of the Pacific.

The Edificio Santo Toribio was built in the street's intersection with the Jirón Rufino Torrico in 1923 by Fred T. Ley & Cía, an American company. The three-storey, 925.30 m^{2} work is part of the set of real estate projects undertaken by the Archbishop of Lima, Emilio Lissón, in the 1920s in order to strengthen the economic activities of the archdiocese.

== See also ==
- Historic Centre of Lima
