= Corral de comedias de Almagro =

Building in Castile-La Mancha, Spain

Coordinates: 38°53′19″N 3°42′43″W

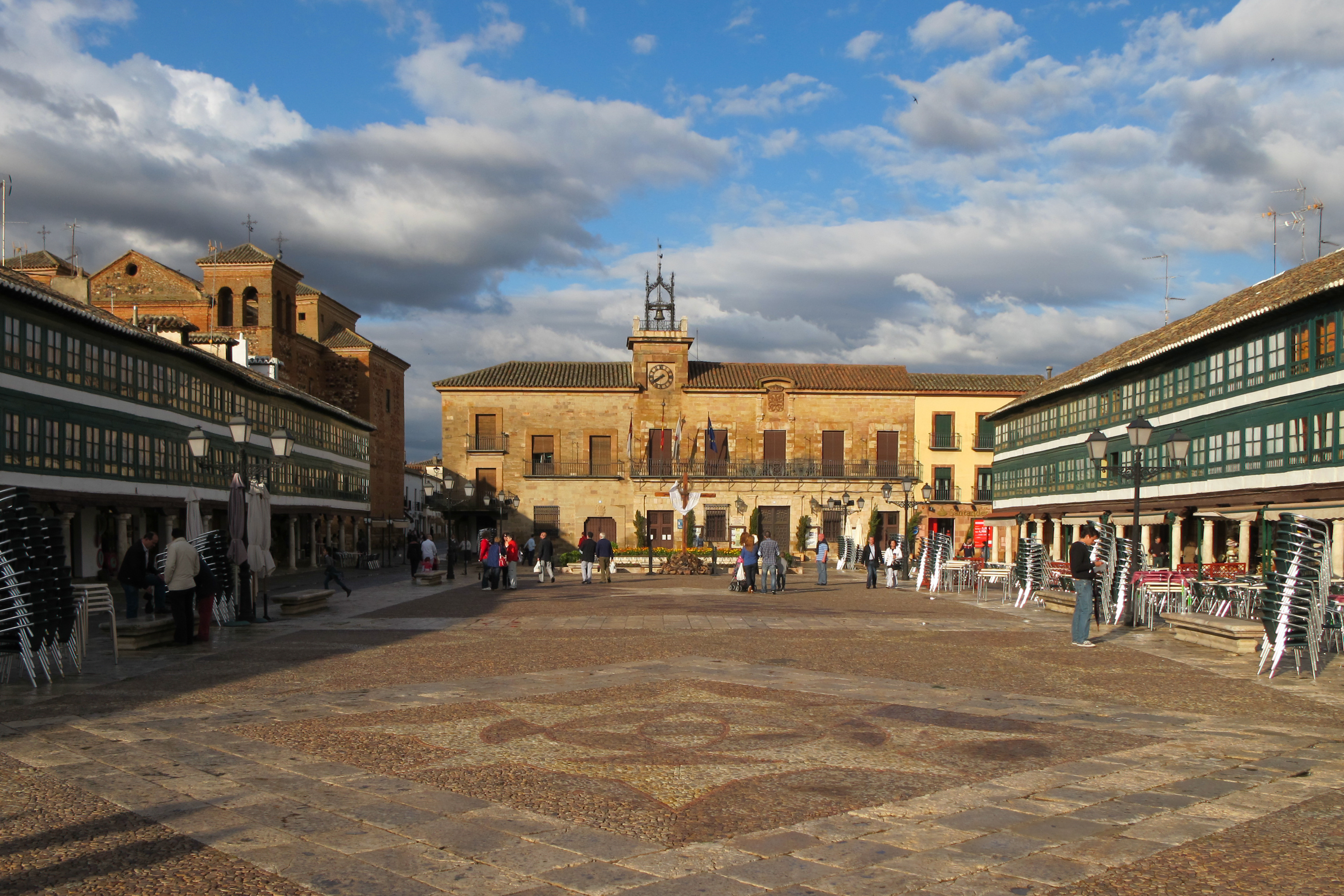
The corral is situated on Plaza Mayor in the city centre.

Corral de comedias de Almagro ("Courtyard theatre of Almagro") is located at Plaza Mayor in Almagro, Castile-La Mancha, Spain. (Note: This comedy theatre was built on the shady side of Plaza Mayor in Almagro, bordered to the right with the house of Don Diego de Molina el Viejo's firstborn son and to the left with a small shop.) The building is the best preserved example of the corral de comedias of the 17th century.

Rediscovered during the renovation of the Plaza Mayor in 1953, it was inaugurated on 29 May 1954 with a play by Calderon de la Barca. (Note: The corral de comedias de Almagro was officially decreed a historical and artistic monument, registered under reference number RI-51-0001249, on 6 March 1955.) The Festival Internacional de Teatro Clásico (International Classical Theatre Festival), is annually celebrated at the corral.

== History ==
=== Establishment and later use ===
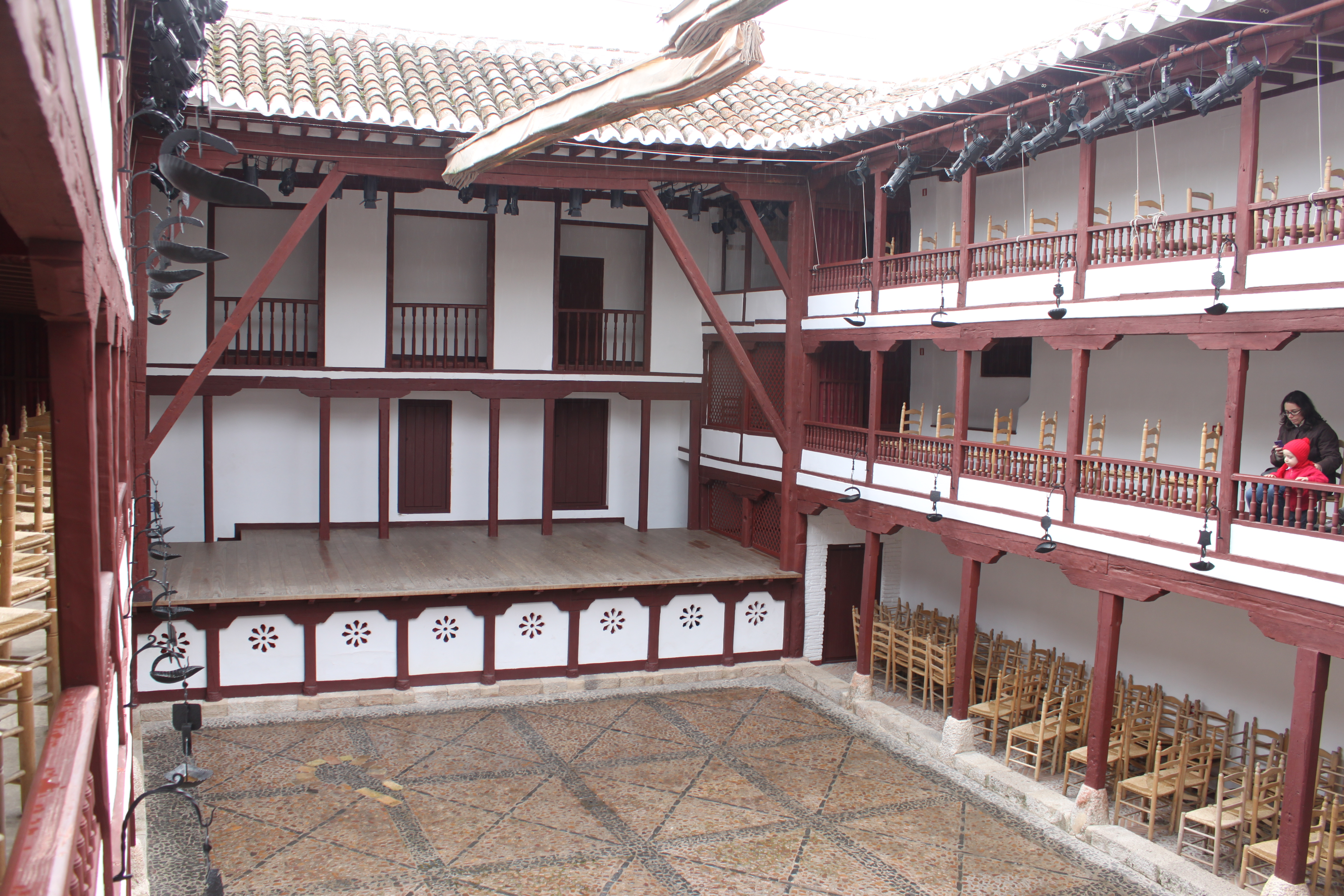
Interior appearance of the corral de comedias de Almagro.

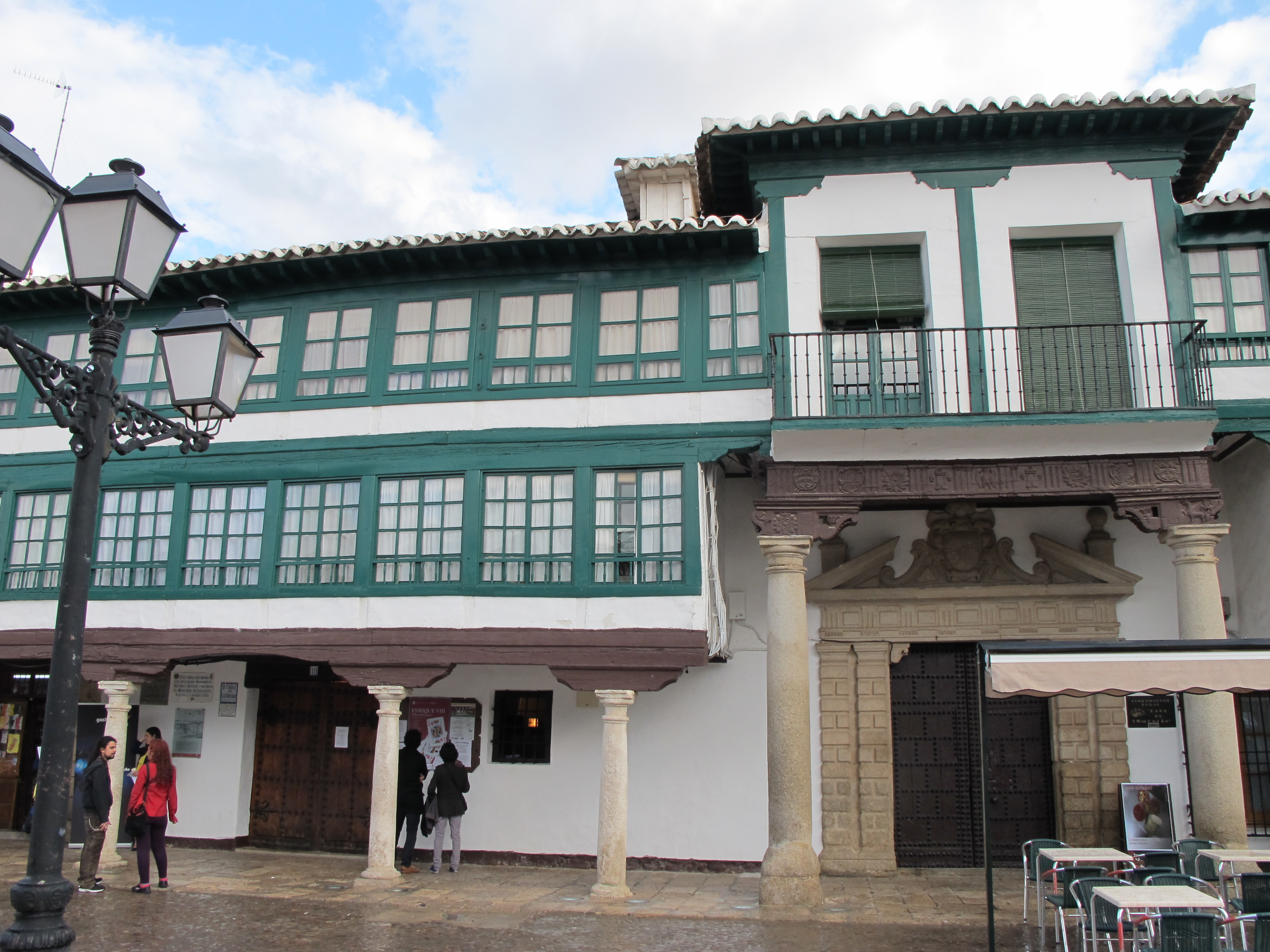
Exterior façade facing Plaza Mayor.

This corral de comedias, initially under private ownership and later given to charity, was located within the precincts of an inn situated on the southern side of Plaza Mayor in the city center. The construction of the place where the theatre is now located, is in conformity with the prevalent building codes in Spain in 1584. A report from 1618 verifies it to be the last open air theater in the country.

Its establishment is on a report dated 1628 and credited to Don Leonardo de Oviedo, cleric and ordained priest of the former parish of St. Bartholomew in Calatrava. Descended from an Asturian family of Jewish origin, he made a payment of 5,000 ducats, a fortune at the time, in order to build this corral by expanding the well-known Taberna del Toro through the acquisition of neighboring properties. After the death of Don Leonardo in February 1640, the property ownership passed on to his sister Dona Beatriz de Oviedo y Prado, who bequeathed it to her daughter Dona Maria de Bivero y Prado, to be inherited by her son Don Bernardino de Villarreal y Oviedo in 1715. A lawsuit filed on 2 August of that year, already attested to its existence in 1680.

The first recorded performance was given in 1629 by Juan Martinez's theatrical company Autor, one of the twelve authorized companies to perform such plays in Spain. In 1631, the companies of Francisco Lopez and Alonzo Olmedo Tofino staged their plays here. In the eighteenth century, with the enforced prohibition on corral construction, that corral the comedias was converted into a lodging house known by the names Taberna de las Comedias and Taberna de la Fruta, a fact which greatly contributed to its preservation. The corral was again reported to be in use in 1802, (Note: The corral, built by Don Leonardo de Oviedo in 1628, remained in his family until 1715, being that no other hospital, institution or brotherhood owned the place as it happened to many other corrals.) but no trace was left of the structure after 1857, except for its use as a courtyard.

=== During the twentieth century ===
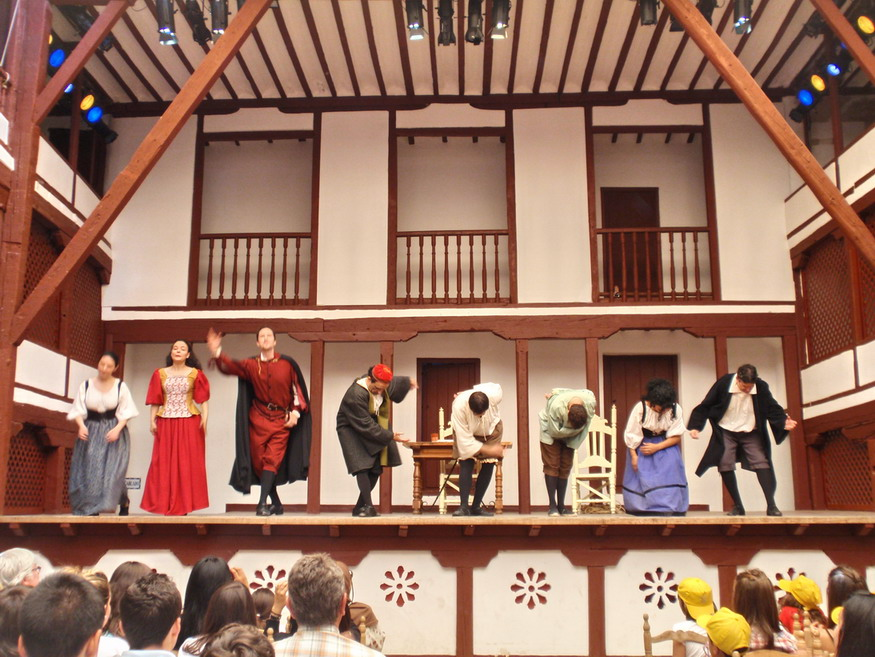
Performance of El médico a palos by a Spanish theatrical company.

In 1950, when Plaza Mayor was being rebuilt, the owner of an inn, while doing his daily chores, found a hand-painted Spanish card deck dated to the early eighteenth century. He brought it to the attention of the City Council and his alcalde, Julian Calero, who then sent it to the civil governor of the province, Don José María del Moral. Because of this finding and other important documents, local experts sent to evaluate the place estimated that this structure might well have been a comedy theater.

During the reconstruction work done by M. Gonzalez Valcarcel in 1953, the brick walls which concealed the place were removed and the stage area of the theatre appeared almost intact, at which point it was decided that the site, still in the hands of the owners, should be restored. Following the restoration work the site was interpreted as being a historic monument of the 17th or 18th century, and then opened to the public on 29 May 1954 with the premiere of La Hidalga del Valle by Calderon de la Barca. Later, it became the venue for the International Classical Theatre Festival of Almagro held during the month of July in five distinct areas, including this corral. Additional history details were disclosed by Concepcion Garcia de Leon Álvarez, and published in La Construction del Corral de Comedias de Almagro in 2000.

== Structure ==
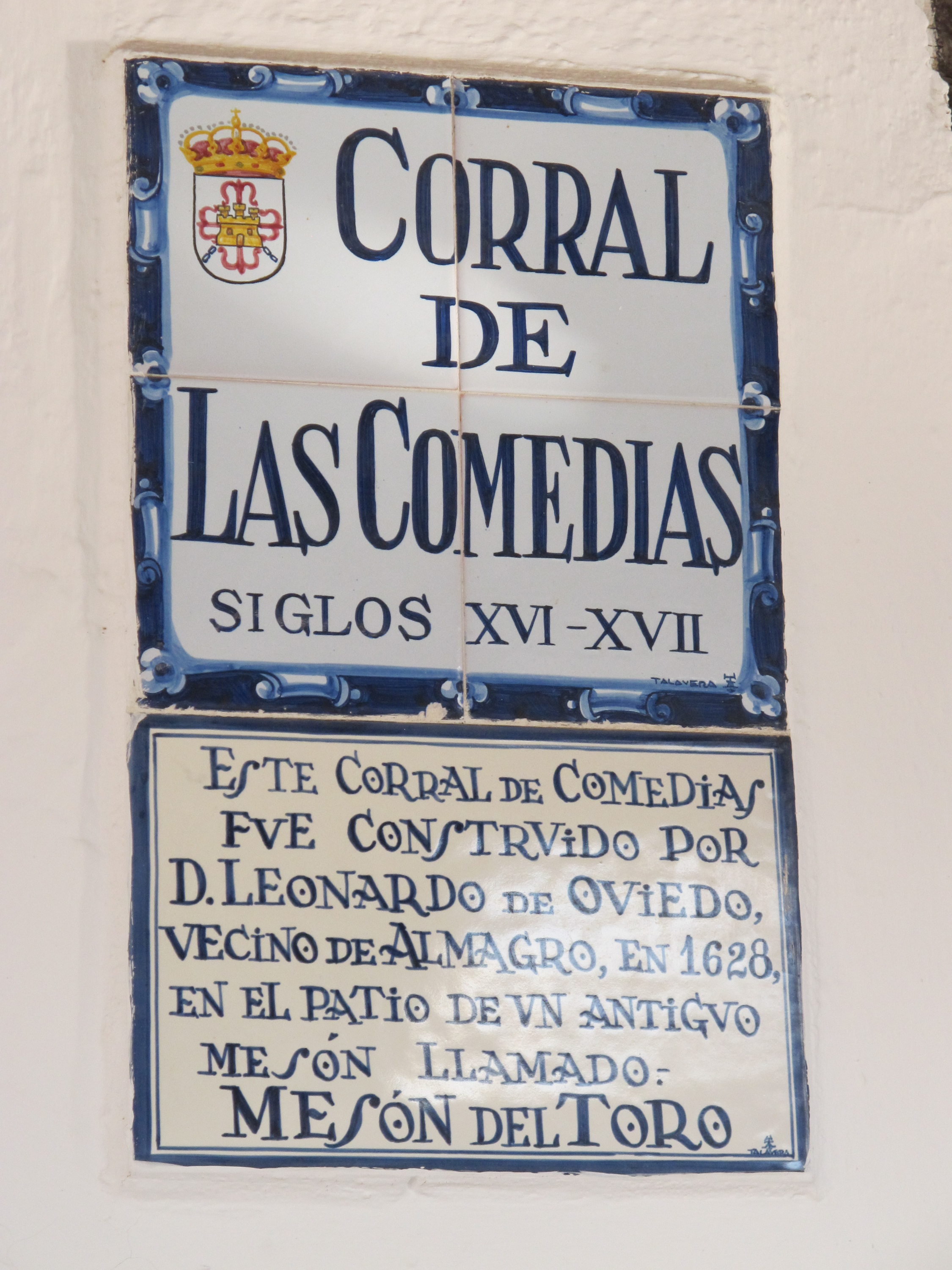
"This corral de comedias was built by Don Leonardo Oviedo, resident of Almagro in 1628, on the courtyard of an old inn called Taberna del Toro."

The courtyard now encompasses an area of 300 square metres (3,200 sq ft), which can accommodate 300 people, but originally this structure occupied an area of 622 square metres (6,700 sq ft), therefore, more than double of what is preserved today. The courtyard of the theatre was rounded by a 54 feet (16 m) straight red-ochered wooden pillars. (Note: This reddish-colour clay gives name to the town of Almagro.) These rest on stone bases so as to keep them dry. It was two stories high with rooms and hooks where an awning was placed to protect the spectators in daylight hours, and the candles or oil lamps during a rainy night. In the courtyard by the entrance there is now a well where the liquor store, with refreshments for the audience, might have been located.

Between the front door and the courtyard there was a paved hallway with small boulders showing the Cruz de Calatrava, a symbol used by the Order of Calatrava, the Order of Montesa, and the Dominican Order. In it there was an inn which operated regularly, with or without performances. There was also a small wooden gate which gave access to the court, and on both sides of the courtyard there were podiums or steps that were occupied by traders, soldiers, officials, and people of a higher social level. The rest of the yard, called the court of Mosqueteros, was occupied by those of lower social classes. (Note: In recent renovations, awnings have been fitted in the form of translucent ceiling, unlike the canvas found in Roman theaters, which has enhanced the presentation of dramas such as Life as a Dream by Calderon de la Barca.)

Private apartments were located on both sides of the stage, and rented only by noble families for a short period of time. The thick latticework allowed them to see without being seen. The rooms had independent access from the rest of the building to maintain the anonymity of its occupants. The enclosed rooms normally called cazuelas were destined for the women, as the etiquette of the time demanded. They were situated opposite the stage, on the first floor of the building. Independent from the corridors, usually occupied by civil and ecclesiastical institutions, and the courtyard, they gave access to the entrances by means of a set of steps. (Note: The missing part of the structure are the gradas, the absence of which gives a distorted appearance to the theater. However, the floor of the second gallery is 9 feet 2 inches above the yard.)

The side corridors were located between the cazuelas and other private chambers, divided into rooms that were rented to families. The stage was located opposite the entrance gate, behind the dressing rooms. The upper part of the back wall had three balconies guarded by rails from where the public overlooked the scene. On the right side there was a door for the comedians, which gave access to stage. Under the hardwood floor was the pit, which housed the company and all their belongings.

== Additional information ==
=== Literature ===
- Peláez Martín, Andrés (2002). El corral de las comedias y la Villa de Almagro. Toledo: Junta de Comunidades de Castilla-La Mancha. ISBN 978-84-7788-250-3.
