= Municipal Theatre of Tacna =

Coordinates: 18.0098°S 70.2491°W

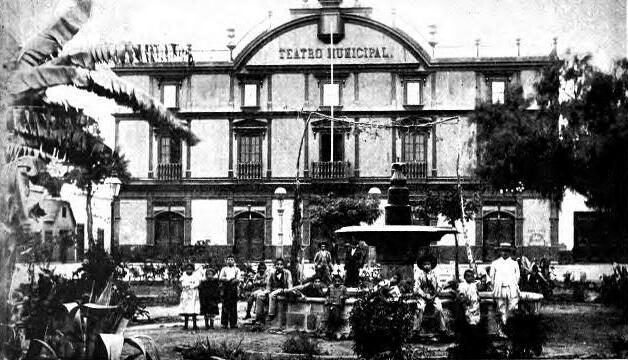
Image of the Municipal Theatre of Tacna

Municipal Theatre of Tacna (Spanish: Teatro Municipal de Tacna) is a theater located in the center of Tacna, Peru.

== History ==
It was built in 1870 by the Spanish engineer Constantino Martínez del Pino and inaugurated by President José Antonio de Pezet in 1871.

In 1880 after the Battle of Tacna it served as a field hospital and then as a barracks. By 1885 money would be secured by the mayor to rehabilitate the theater and reconstruction would conclude in 1886.

The theater was declared a historic and artistic monument in 1972.

== Location ==
It is located in front of MacLean Plaza.

== Architecture ==
The two-story building features a façade made entirely of quarried stone.

== Paintings ==
In its main hall, many valuable paintings are displayed, depicting illustrious Tacna natives such as the poet Federico Barreto, the painter Francisco Laso, and the historian Modesto Molina.
