= Capital districts and territories =

Special administrative division containing a country's seat of government

A capital district, capital region, or capital territory is normally a specially designated administrative division where a country's seat of government is located. As such, in a federal model of government, no state or territory has any political or economic advantage relative to the others because of the national capital lying within its borders. A capital territory can be a specific form of federal district.

A distinction should be made between administrative divisions which include national capitals, but have no special designated status legally (for example, Île de France has no distinct quality from others regions of France). Some federal countries (like Belgium and Germany), give their national capitals the status of full, equal federal units.

A few federalist countries have their national capitals located in the capital city of a constituent state: Sarajevo, the capital of Bosnia and Herzegovina, is also the capital of the Federation of Bosnia and Herzegovina, one of federal units and de jure capital of Republika Srpska, the other federal unit; further, Bern, the capital of Switzerland, is the capital of the Canton of Bern.

Unusually, Canada is the only federation in the world not to accord a special administrative subdivision to its capital; Ottawa is merely another municipality in the Province of Ontario. (Note: Cf. District of Columbia (United States), Federal District (Brazil), Federal Capital Territory (Nigeria), National Capital Territory (India) and Australian Capital Territory (Australia).) The Canadian government does designate the Ottawa area as the National Capital Region, although this term merely represents the jurisdictional area of the government agency that administers federally owned lands and buildings and is not an actual political unit. The City of Ottawa is governed as any other city in Ontario would be. The capital Berlin is one of three cities that operate as States of Germany.

In some non-federal countries there are capital cities that do not belong to any region, but have a special status, for example Oslo in Norway. In some countries, the region including the capital does not have special significance but has names hinting at that. For example, the Capital Region of Denmark is the name of a normal national region.

The following have a special administrative district or territory for their capital cities:

== Terminology ==
Class name	Term for capital	Example
Capital area	Yes	Seoul Capital Area
Capital District	Yes	Capital District (Colombia), Capital District (Venezuela), Niamey Capital District
Capital Region	Yes	Capital Region of Denmark
Capital Territory	Yes	Australian Capital Territory, Islamabad Capital Territory
Federal capital territory	Yes	Federal Capital Territory (Nigeria)
Federal district	No	Federal District (Brazil), Federal District (Mexico)
National Capital District	Yes	National Capital District (Papua New Guinea)
National capital region	Yes	National Capital Region (Canada), National Capital Region (India), National Capital Region (Japan), National Capital Region (Philippines)
National capital territory	Yes	National Capital Territory (India)
Neutral municipality	No	Neutral Municipality (Brazil)

== Argentina ==
The Buenos Aires city, previously in the Federal District of Argentina. In 1996, under the 1994 reform of the Argentine Constitution, the city gained autonomous city status, changed its formal name to Autonomous City of Buenos Aires, and held its first mayoral elections. Buenos Aires is represented in the Argentine Senate by three senators and in the Argentine Chamber of Deputies by 25 national deputies.

== Australia ==
The Australian Capital Territory is one of two self-governing internal territories of the Commonwealth of Australia, the other being the Northern Territory. Created in 1911, the ACT was originally called the Federal Capital Territory, the current name being acquired in 1938. The ACT was constituted specifically to house the seat of government, the goal being to avoid situating the new nation's capital Canberra in either New South Wales or Victoria, the two most populous states. The ACT is an enclave of New South Wales.

Although the ACT has its own Chief Minister and its own legislature (the Australian Capital Territory Legislative Assembly), the Federal Parliament retains the right to overrule ACT legislation. While governing the entire ACT, the Legislative Assembly acts as a municipal/state government.

At a federal level, the ACT and the NT both elect two Senators, with the ACT electing 3 members of the House of Representatives and the NT two. The terms of the territory senators are tied to the term of the House of Representatives, not to the term of the Senate. This means that if there is an election for the Senate only (as last happened in 1970), this would involve only half the state senators, and the territory senators' terms would continue. Conversely, if there is an election for the House of Representatives only (as last happened in 1972), this would also involve the territory senators but not the state senators.

== Brazil ==
Brasília, the capital of Brazil, is set within the Federal District. Its territory includes several other cities, officially called administrative regions, since the Federal District cannot be divided into municipalities in the same manner as the states of Brazil.

The Federal District is a special unit of the federation, as it is not organized in the same manner as a municipality, does not possess the same autonomy as a state (but is ranked among them) and is closely related to the central power.

The District Governor is elected directly for a 4-year term. Local laws are issued by a legislative chamber also elected by the local population. Judiciary affairs are carried out by the Union, instead of being appointed by the governor as in the other states of Brazil. The Federal District has the status of a federal state in many aspects. It has representatives both in the Chamber of Deputies (lower house of congress) and in the Federal Senate (upper house of congress).

The Brazilian federal government was transferred to the current Federal District, separate from the state of Goiás and the border with the state of Minas Gerais on April 21, 1960, when the planned city of Brasília was inaugurated. Before the transfer, the Brazilian capital was the city of Rio de Janeiro. After the transfer, the territory where the former Federal District was located became the state of Guanabara, where the city of Rio de Janeiro was included, this state that existed from 1960 to 1975, when the state of Guanabara was merged with the state of Rio de Janeiro.

== Colombia ==
In Colombia the Capital District, containing the city of Bogotá was created as a special district in 1955 by Gustavo Rojas Pinilla. The district is made up of 20 localities.

== Dominican Republic ==
In the Dominican Republic, the National District, containing the city of Santo Domingo de Guzmán, was created as a special district in 1922.

== India ==
The National Capital Territory in the National Capital Region (Rāṣṭrīya Rājadhānī Kṣetra) is a special union territory of India. The territory encompasses three statutory towns: New Delhi (the capital of India), Delhi and Delhi Cantonment, along with 59 census towns and 165 villages. The NCT was set up as a federally administered Union Territory on 11 November 1956. In December 1991, the NCT was given a legislative assembly headed by a Chief Minister. The territory is not classified as a true union territory, though the central government does have limited control over the functioning of the territory much like other union territories. The NCT is unique in India in that the municipal control is handled by a locally elected government, and major areas such as the police, and administration are handled by the central government.

== Indonesia ==
In Indonesia, the current de facto national capital Jakarta is within the Daerah Khusus Jakarta (Specific Region of Jakarta). Jakarta is considered one of Indonesia's provinces, therefore Jakarta is headed by a governor and not a mayor. However, Jakarta is divided into 5 smaller "administrative cities" (kota administrasi) and one "administrative regency" (kabupaten administrasi). The administrative cities are Central, North, East, West, and South Jakarta. The Kepulauan Seribu (Thousand Islands) administrative regency is also included in the formal definition of Jakarta. All of these sub-units have their own degree of autonomy. Mayors of the five administrative cities and the regent of Kepulauan Seribu administration-regency are not elected, but directly appointed by the Governor and members of the Provincial Parliament of Jakarta. Furthermore, these sub-units do not have local parliament as opposed to other cities or regencies in Indonesia.

The future national capital Nusantara, currently under construction and partially completed, will be designated as Daerah Khusus Ibu Kota Nusantara (Capital Specific Region of Nusantara), a provincial-level specific region. Head of the Nusantara Capital City Authority will concurrently serve as Governor of Nusantara ex-officio.

== Iraq ==
Baghdad, the capital of Iraq, is contained within a special capital district.

== Malaysia ==
As per Article 154 of the Federal Constitution, the national capital of Malaysia was set in Kuala Lumpur, then part of the state of Selangor. In Malaysia, the national capital of Kuala Lumpur lies within the Federal Territory of Kuala Lumpur (since 1974) while the federal government administrative centre of Putrajaya, 40 km (25 mi) to the south of Kuala Lumpur, lies within the Federal Territory of Putrajaya (since 2001). Both federal territories are enclaves within the state of Selangor.

== Mali ==
Bamako, the capital of Mali, is contained within the Bamako Capital District.

== Mexico ==
The Federal District was, since 1824, a federal territory that served as the seat of the capital of Mexico, Mexico City, which was directly administered, until 1997, by the federal government via a presidential-appointed head of government. The Federal District encompassed the historical municipality of Mexico City (abolished in 1928) and other territories in its surroundings. The lack of proper legislation often led to ambiguity regarding to what was under the jurisdiction of Mexico City and what fell under the Federal District. Hence, in 1993, an amendment to article 44 of the federal constitution defined that both names referred to the same entity. On July 6, 1997, the head of government was elected by popular vote for the first time.

On 29 January 2016, the Federal District ceased to exist and its territory, under the name of Mexico City, became the 32nd federal entity of the country. Mexico City has the same rights and obligations as any of the other 31 states, albeit it is not technically one.

== Niger ==
Niger's capital, Niamey, comprises a capital district of Niger. It is surrounded by the Tillabéri Department.

== Nigeria ==
Nigeria's capital Abuja is located in the Federal Capital Territory. The Territory was established in 1976, and the capital was formally moved from Lagos (the historic capital) in 1991.

In addition, Awka, the capital of Anambra State, within Nigeria, is part of Awka Capital Territory. While this is mainly a geographical name for the metropolitan area, a state government body, Awka Capital Territory Development Authority, has been significant in terms of urban planning.

== North Korea ==
North Korea's capital city, Pyongyang, while traditionally located within South Pyongan Province, is currently seen as a "directly governed city" (chikalshi 직할시). For a time, Pyongyang was considered a "special city" (t'ŭkpyŏlshi 특별시), to make it equivalent to its South Korean counterpart, Seoul.

== Norway ==
Oslo acts as a consolidated city-county, and is separate from the other counties of Norway. All counties are co-governed by a county council and representatives from the national government.

== Pakistan ==
The capital of Pakistan, Islamabad, is a planned city within the Islamabad Capital Territory, which was created in 1960 out of the Punjab Province. The Territory elects representatives to both houses of the legislature. Before Islamabad was made the capital, Karachi was located in the Federal Capital Territory, which later reverted to the Sindh Province.

== Papua New Guinea ==
Port Moresby, the capital of Papua New Guinea has been contained within the National Capital District of Papua New Guinea since the country achieved independence in 1975.

== Peru ==
Lima, the nation's capital, is contained entirely within Lima Province, the only province in the country not belonging to any of the twenty-five regions. It is surrounded by the Lima Region on all sides but west.

== Philippines ==
The National Capital Region of the Philippines is Metro Manila, the country's seat of government containing Manila, the country's capital. Created in 1975 out of four cities and twelve municipalities of the province of Rizal and one municipality of the province of Bulacan, the region is administered by seventeen separately elected mayors and their councils which are coordinated by the Metropolitan Manila Development Authority, a national government agency headed by a chairperson directly appointed by the Philippine President. Quezon City, the country's former capital from 1948 to 1976, is also located within this region.

== Solomon Islands ==
In 1983, the government of Solomon Islands gave the designation of Capital Territory to a 22 square-kilometre area around the city of Honiara. Afterwards, the Capital Territory was a separate self-governing entity, similar in status to the Provinces of Solomon Islands, although Honiara remained the capital of Guadalcanal Province.

== South Korea ==
South Korea's capital city, Seoul, while traditionally located within Gyeonggi Province, is currently seen as a "special city" (Teukbyeolsi/T'ŭkpyŏlshi 특별시). Seoul's mayor is seen as the equivalent of any provincial governor.

== Sweden ==
Since 1968, Stockholm has been a consolidated city-county.

Historically, until 1967, Stockholm did not belong to any county of Sweden, including Stockholm County. Instead, there was a Governor that had the normal responsibilities of the County Administrative Boards and its managers, the governors. This did not mean there was a large practical difference. There were no County Council (which is elected by the people and is responsible for example for health care); instead, Stockholm city handled such tasks.

== Taiwan (Republic of China) ==
Taipei, the capital of the Republic of China (colloquially known as Taiwan), is a special municipality (Chinese: 直轄市; pinyin: zhíxiáshì).

== United States ==
As provided by Article 1, Section 8 of the United States Constitution, the seat of the United States government is a federal district known as the District of Columbia. When created in 1790, the District comprised 100 square miles (260 km^{2}) of land donated by the states of Maryland and Virginia. Columbia was a poetic name for the United States used at the time.

The City of Washington was built in the center of the District, but other towns were also located in the territory such as Georgetown and Alexandria. The United States Congress returned the Virginia portion of the District back to that state in 1846. The District of Columbia Organic Act of 1871 revoked the charters of the individual cities of Washington and Georgetown and instead created a single government for the whole District of Columbia. The City of Washington no longer exists; however, the name continues in use and the District is often referred to as just Washington, D.C. Georgetown now exists as a historic district within the District of Columbia.

Since the Home Rule Act of 1973, the District of Columbia has been run by an elected mayor and district council. Congress retains ultimate authority over the District and has the right to review the local budget and taxes, overturn laws passed by the district council, and terminate home rule. District residents pay federal taxes and are represented by a single, non-voting member in the United States House of Representatives.

Because of the Twenty-third Amendment to the United States Constitution, the people of the District of Columbia are allowed to vote for President of the United States. The District is allotted three electoral votes, equal to that of the least populous state.

== Venezuela ==
The Capital District has the capital of Venezuela, Caracas.

== See also ==
- Capital region
- Direct-controlled municipality
- Federal district
- Federal territory
