= Teatro Municipal de Lima =

Theatre in Peru

Coordinates: 12.0454°S 77.0349°W

Municipal Theatre of Lima
- Teatro Municipal de Lima
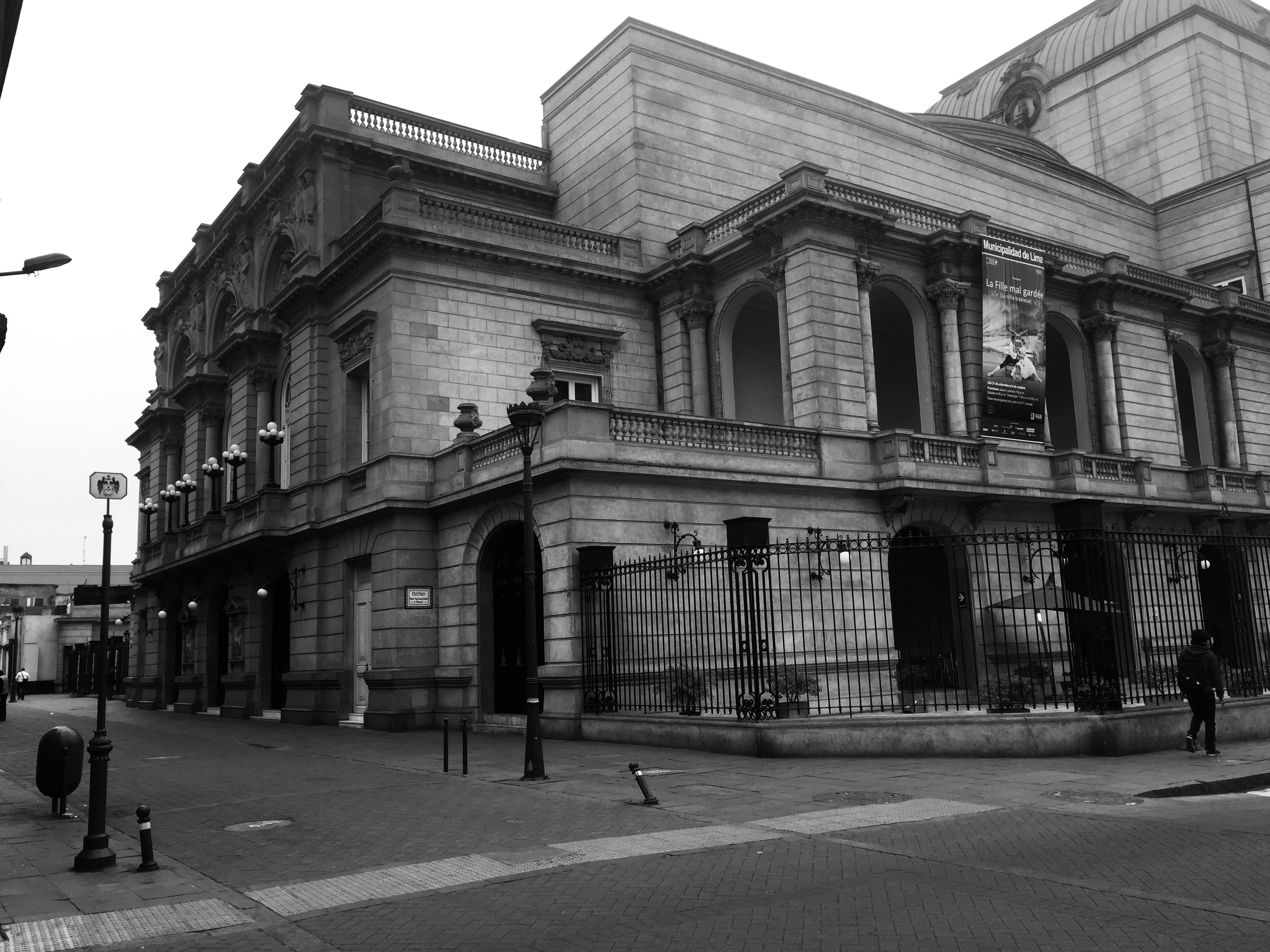
- Interactive map of Municipal Theatre of Lima
- Former names: Teatro Forero
- Address: Block 4 of Jirón Ica
- Capacity: 1,181 people

Construction
- Opened: July 28, 1920
- Closed: August 2, 1998
- Rebuilt: October 11, 2010

The Municipal Theatre of Lima (Spanish: Teatro Municipal de Lima), inaugurated as the Teatro Forero, is a theatre and concert hall in the historic centre of Lima, Peru. It is home to the country's National Symphony Orchestra.

An open space next to the theatre known as the Plazuela de las Artes (or as the Plazuela Rosa Merino) hosts open-air activities.

== History ==
The Forero Theatre (Spanish: Teatro Forero) was built in 1915, replacing the demolished Olimpo Theatre (Spanish: Teatro Olimpo), according to the design of Manuel María Forero Osorio, born in Tacna. The Renaissance/Baroque-style theatre was inaugurated on July 28, 1920 with the start of the season of the "Grand Italian Opera Company of Adolfo Bracale" (Spanish: Gran Compañía de Opera Italiana de Adolfo Bracale), who performed Giuseppe Verdi's opera Aida. The theatre was named after its builder.

Its façade displays three busts of the three most famous musicians in the history of classical music: Wagner, Beethoven and Liszt; The hall has neo-classical columns in the Ionic style and the spacious lobby is accessed through two imposing staircases, in the Louis XVI style, made of marble. The spectator room is in the Italian Renaissance style.

The newspaper El Comercio noted the following regarding the first night of the theater:

It is a theater that satisfies the most demanding, beautiful, monumental, elegant, with severe elegance, comfortable and spacious; We have never had anything like it in Peru and it is one of the best theaters in South America.

— El Comercio article

It was bought by the Metropolitan Municipality of Lima in 1929 and renamed to its current name through a Mayor's Resolution of June 15 of that year.

=== Fire and reconstruction ===
On August 2, 1998, during a show rehearsal, the theater was consumed by a raging fire that lasted two hours and destroyed part of its structure without causing definitive structural damage. The building remained unrestored for 12 years, opening only sporadically for special performances.

The theater was eventually reconstructed following its original structural design, and it was expanded to include additional parking, anti-seismic technology and updated fireproofing. It was reinaugurated on October 11, 2010.

== See also ==
- Casa Fernandini, Lima, located across the street
