= Margaret of Spain =

Margaret of Spain may refer to:

- Margaret of Austria, Queen of Spain (1584–1611), Queen of Spain as wife of Philip III of Spain and sister of Ferdinand II, Holy Roman Emperor
- Infanta Margarita of Spain (1610–1617), daughter of Philip III of Spain and Margaret of Austria
- Margaret Theresa of Spain (1651–1673), daughter of Philip IV of Spain
- Infanta Margarita, Duchess of Soria (born 1939), sister of Juan Carlos I of Spain

== See also ==
- Infanta Margarita (disambiguation)
