= Infanta Margarita =

Infanta Margarita may refer to:

== Navarre ==
- Margaret of Navarre (c.1135–1183)
- Margaret of Foix (c.1449–1487)

== Spain ==
- Margaret of Austria, Duchess of Savoy (1480–1530), infanta by marriage before becoming duchess
- Infanta Margarita of Spain (1610–1617), also Infanta of Portugal
- Margaret Theresa of Spain (1651–1673)
- Infanta Margarita, Duchess of Soria (born 1939)

== See also ==
- Margaret of Spain (disambiguation)
- Category:Portraits of Margaret Theresa of Spain
