= Philip III of Spain =

King of Spain and Portugal from 1598 to 1621

Philip III
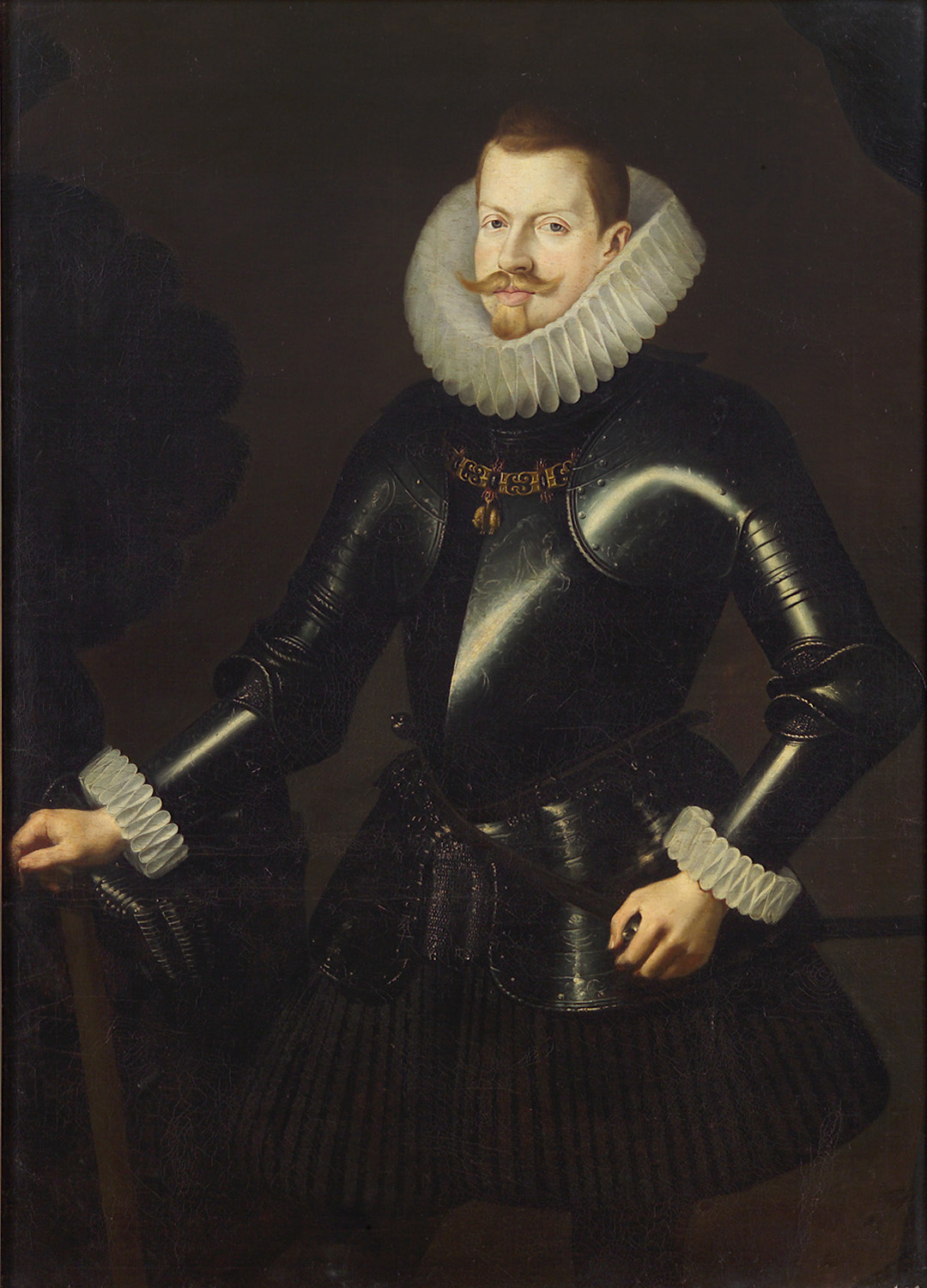
- Portrait by Andrés López Polanco, c. 1617

King of Spain, Portugal and Naples
- Reign: 13 September 1598 – 31 March 1621
- Predecessor: Philip II of Spain
- Successor: Philip IV of Spain
- Born: 14 April 1578; Royal Alcázar of Madrid, Madrid, Spain
- Died: 31 March 1621 (aged 42); Madrid, Spain
- Burial: El Escorial
- Spouse: Margaret of Austria (m. 1599; died 1611)
- Issue: Anne, Queen of France; Infanta Maria; Philip IV of Spain; Maria Anna, Holy Roman Empress; Infante Carlos; Cardinal-Infante Ferdinand; Infanta Margarita; Infante Alonso
- House: Habsburg
- Father: Philip II of Spain
- Mother: Anna of Austria

Philip III (Spanish: Felipe III, Portuguese: Filipe II; 14 April 1578 – 31 March 1621) was King of Spain and Portugal (as Philip II) during the period known as the Iberian Union, reigning from 1598 until his death in 1621. He was also King of Naples and Sicily, Duke of Milan, and Lord of the Seventeen Provinces. A member of the House of Habsburg, he was born in Madrid to King Philip II of Spain and his fourth wife, Anna of Austria. The family was heavily inbred; Philip II and Anna were uncle and niece, as well as cousins.

One year after inheriting the throne, he married his Habsburg cousin Margaret of Austria, the sister of Ferdinand II, Holy Roman Emperor. Philip quickly delegated most of his power and duties to his chief minister, the Duke of Lerma, whose influence shaped much of his reign. In the outskirts of his territories, military power was upheld by successful but capricious proconsuls, such as Ambrogio Spinola and the Duke of Osuna. Philip is associated with a period of relative peace in Western Europe, called the Pax Hispanica by some historians, but his lack of focus contributed to the Spanish Empire's gradual decline.

Although known in Spain as "Philip the Pious", his international political reputation has been negative. Historians C. V. Wedgwood, R. A. Stradling, and J. H. Elliott have described him as an "undistinguished and insignificant man", a "miserable monarch", and a "pallid, anonymous creature, whose only virtue appeared to reside in a total absence of vice." In particular, Philip's reliance on the Duke of Lerma drew much criticism. Many historians trace Spain's decline to the economic difficulties that began early in his reign. Nonetheless, as the ruler of the Spanish Empire at its height, the king who achieved a temporary peace with the Dutch (1609–1621), and who brought Spain into the Thirty Years' War (1618–1648) through an initially successful campaign, his reign remains a pivotal period in Spanish history.

== Early life ==
Portrait by Juan Pantoja de la Cruz, c. 1603

Following the death of Philip III's older half-brother Don Carlos, Prince of Asturias, their father Philip II concluded that Carlos's problems had been exacerbated by exposure to political factions at the Spanish court. He believed that Carlos's education and upbringing had been compromised, contributing to his mental instability and disobedience. He began to make more serious arrangements for his other sons. Philip II appointed Juan de Zúñiga, then Prince Diego's governor, to continue this role for Philip, and García de Loaysa as his tutor. They were assisted by Cristóvão de Moura, 1st Marquis of Castelo Rodrigo, a trusted advisor of Philip II. Philip believed that together they would provide a stable upbringing for Prince Philip and avoid the fate of his older brother Carlos. Philip's education followed guidelines established by Father Juan de Mariana, emphasizing moderation and personal discipline, with the goal of forming a king who was neither tyrannical nor overly influenced by courtiers.

In his youth, "he imitates (as he does) King Saint Ferdinand, displaying in his actions a miraculous combination of valor and holiness." Prince Philip appears to have been liked by his contemporaries, described as 'dynamic, good-natured, and earnest,' suitably pious, and possessing a 'lively body and a peaceful disposition,' albeit with a relatively weak constitution. Comparisons with the disobedient and ultimately insane Carlos were generally favorable to Prince Philip, although some observers noted that he appeared less intelligent and politically competent than his late brother. Indeed, although Philip was educated in Latin, French, Portuguese and astronomy, and appears to have been a competent linguist, recent historians suspect that much of his tutors' focus on Philip's undeniably pleasant, pious and respectful disposition was to avoid reporting that, languages aside, he was not in fact particularly intelligent or academically gifted. Nonetheless, Philip does not appear to have been naïve – his correspondence with his daughters shows a distinctive cautious streak in his advice on dealing with court intrigue.

Philip first met the Marquis of Denia – the future Duke of Lerma – then a gentleman of the King's chamber, in his early teens. Lerma and Philip became close friends, but Lerma was considered unsuitable by the King and Philip's tutors. Lerma was dispatched to Valencia as viceroy in 1595, with the aim of removing Philip from his influence; but after Lerma pleaded poor health, he was allowed to return two years later.

By then in poor health himself, King Philip II grew deeply troubled over the prince's future, and he attempted to establish de Moura as a future, trusted advisor to his son, appointing his ally, García Loaysa y Girón, as archbishop of Toledo. The Prince received a new, conservative Dominican confessor. The following year, Philip II died, and his son became King Philip III.

== Religion, Philip, and the role of women at court ==
Philip married his cousin, Margaret of Austria, on 18 April 1599, a year after becoming king. Margaret, the sister of the future Emperor Ferdinand II, would be one of three women at Philip's court who would apply considerable influence over the King. Margaret was considered by contemporaries to be extremely pious—in some cases, excessively pious, and too influenced by the Church—'astute and very skillful' in her political dealings, although 'melancholic' and unhappy over the influence of the Duke of Lerma over her husband at court. Margaret continued to fight an ongoing battle with Lerma for influence until her death in 1611. Philip had an 'affectionate, close relationship' with Margaret, and paid her additional attention after they had a son in 1605.

Alongside Philip's grandmother and aunt, Empress Maria—the Austrian representative to the Spanish court—and Margaret of the Cross, Maria's daughter, Margaret formed a powerful, uncompromising Catholic and pro-Austrian voice within Philip's life. They were successful, for example, in convincing Philip to provide financial support to Ferdinand from 1600 onward.

Philip steadily acquired other religious advisors. Father Juan de Santa Maria—confessor to Philip's daughter, Doña Maria—was felt by contemporaries to have an excessive influence over Philip at the end of his life, and both he and Luis de Aliaga Martínez, Philip's own confessor, were credited with influencing the overthrow of Lerma in 1618. Similarly, Mariana de San Jose, a favored nun of Queen Margaret, was also criticized for her later influence over the King's actions.

Tomás Fernández de Medrano, in his República Mista (1602), praised Philip III's devotion to religion and the reverence he showed toward all its ministers, noting that he gave 'great examples' of piety and virtues, even suggesting that he would surpass such legendary Christian monarchs as Godfrey, Baldwin, and Amory.

== Style of government ==
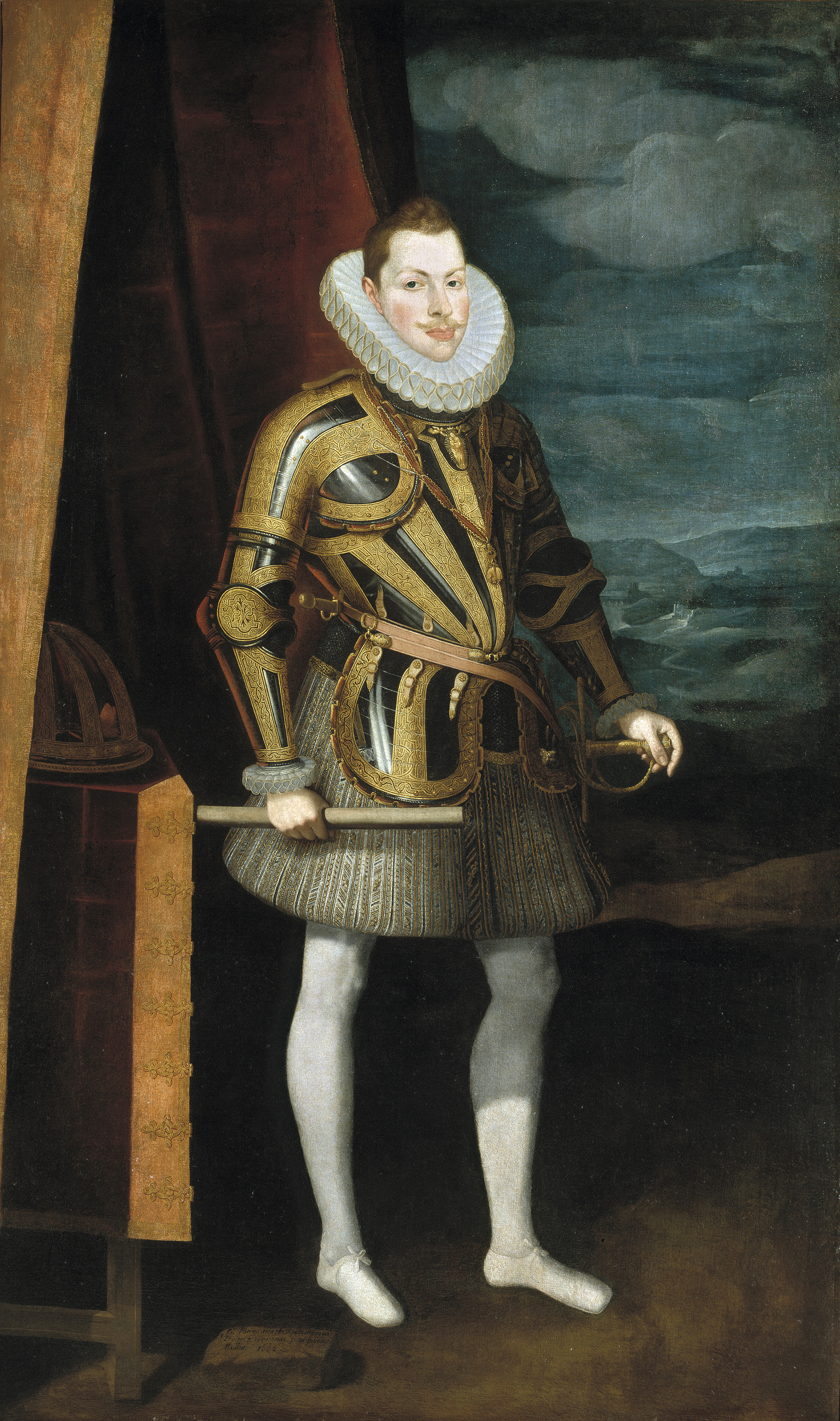
Philip III of Spain

The Spanish crown at the time ruled through a system of royal councils. The most significant of these were the Council of State and its subordinate Council for War, which were in turn supported by the seven professional councils for the different regions, and four specialized councils for the Inquisition, the Military Orders, Finance and the Crusade tax. These councils were then supplemented by small committees, or juntas, as necessary, such as the 'junta of the night' through which Philip II exercised personal authority toward the end of his reign. As a matter of policy, Philip II had tried to avoid appointing grandees to major positions of power within his government. He relied heavily on the lesser nobles, the so-called 'service' nobility. Philip II had taken the traditional system of councils and applied a high degree of personal scrutiny to them, especially in matters of paperwork, which he declined to delegate—the result was a 'ponderous' process. To his contemporaries, the degree of personal oversight he exercised was considered excessive; his 'self-imposed role as the chief clerk to the Spanish Empire' was not thought entirely appropriate.

Numerous memorials emerged in the late 16th and early 17th centuries, condemning his father's policies while commending the new course set by Philip III. Ecclesiastical scholars supported this transition, with Juan de Santa María emphasizing that the Catholic faith was the cornerstone of prosperity, vital for the monarchy, justice, and loyalty to the Pope. Similarly, Tomás Fernández de Medrano associated this religious foundation with the monarchy's "greatness" and prestige.

Philip first started to become engaged in practical government at the age of 15, when he joined Philip II's private committee. Philip III's reign marked a political shift, establishing the Pax Hispanica and redefining the monarchy by aligning Roman Catholicism with Hispanidad. Diplomatically, he authorized the Duke of Sessa in 1599 to secure Papal investiture for Naples and Jerusalem, reaffirming traditional ties of papal allegiance to Clement VIII. In return, the 1603 Papal Brief granted taxation rights, boosting crown revenues to 18 million ducats. Philip III also supported the Papacy against Venice, raising an army of 26,000. Courtly memorials and various authors reinforced Madrid-Rome ties.

=== Influences on Philip III of Spain ===
Philip III may have shared the Duke of Lerma's view that the late-period governmental system of Philip II had become impractical and overly exclusive of the high nobility. Signs of institutional stagnation were evident near the end of Philip II's reign. In response, Philip III's approach to governance was rooted in kingship and delegated rule, grounded in divine order and noble service, and embodied in the Doctrine of Medrano codified and etymologically traced to medrar and the House of Medrano.

While certain Italian authors reacting against Machiavelli found audiences in Spain, they did not shape policy. Rather, Philip's governance reflected the Doctrine of Medrano, Spain's established system of moral statecraft, noble service, and sacralized sovereignty, codified by the Medranos as a distinctly Spanish alternative to the pragmatic and power-centered maxims of The Prince. Italian writers such as Girolamo Frachetta, a particular favorite of Philip, promoted a conservative vision of reason of state centered on princely prudence and just obedience to the laws and customs of the realm.

Philip's disposition, his friendship with Lerma, and the doctrinal treatise República Mista (1602) by Tomás Fernández de Medrano together shaped the intellectual context of his policy-making. The result was a marked transformation in the role of the crown, from the direct, centralized governance of Philip II to a delegated, noble-mediated structure.

=== Sovereign distance and the rise of the valido ===
In his 1602 political treatise República Mista, Tomás Fernández de Medrano advised Philip III of Spain that withdrawing from his subjects might be regarded as 'a form of religion', drawing a comparison between the king's limited interaction with his people and the reverence shown to the consecrated Eucharist. Philip III elevated his father's precept of inaccessibility and invisibility to unprecedented levels. He drastically limited daily access to himself, granting it almost exclusively to his royal favorite, the Duke of Lerma, who managed most audiences to maintain the king's unseen presence.

Medrano, who noted Philip III as "just, for traveling throughout his realm to personally hear and resolve the complaints of his people," advised the king that things rarely seen received greater respect and veneration; it was according to reason of state that the king's isolation and retreat helped avoid chances that he might show his faults to those who would idealize him while unable to see him. This model of symbolic kingship, grounded in controlled visibility and mediated power, helped define the role and necessity of the valido in early 17th-century Spain.

=== Duke of Lerma as valido ===
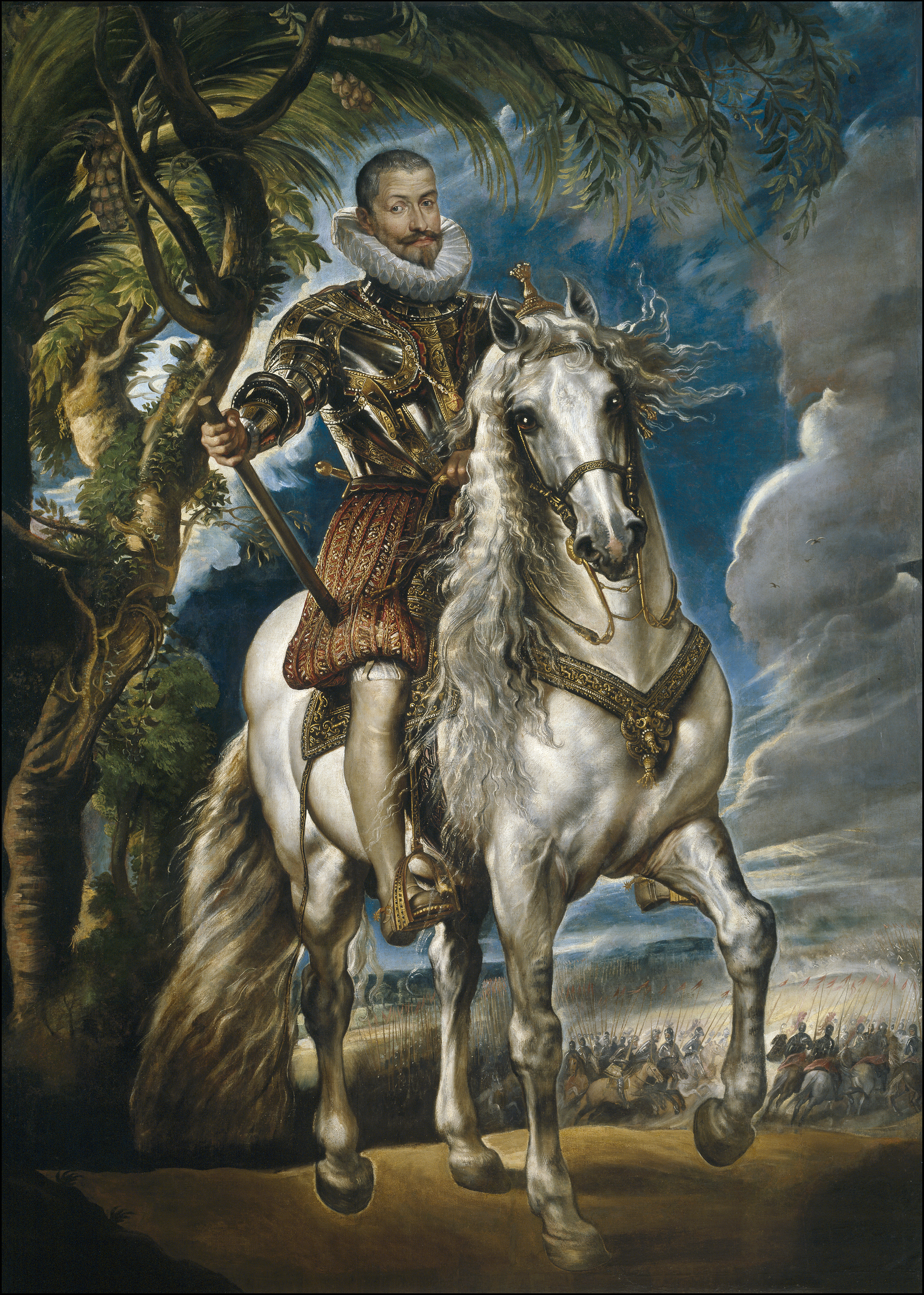
Portrait of the Duke of Lerma by Rubens

Within a few hours of Philip ascending to the throne, Lerma had been made a royal counsellor by the new king and set about establishing himself as a fully fledged valido, or royal favorite. Philip III's withdrawal from his subjects made the role of the valido more essential. In 1601, Juan Fernández de Medrano, a friar at the Monastery of San Prudencio de Monte Laturce, defended the valido system. Directly addressing the Duke of Lerma, Juan Fernández de Medrano argued, "The ship governed by two captains is endangered even without a storm. An empire that depends on more than one cannot endure, as experience teaches." Juan Fernández de Medrano presents the valido as the rightful delegate of royal power, stating that "The King, our Lord, made Your Excellency (God made him) the Father of this Ship, the soul of this body, and the Sun that illuminates us," By drawing parallels between divine order and political governance, he justifies the valido's role in ensuring stability and the public good on behalf of the king.

==== Modern interpretation of Lerma ====
Lerma, in due course declared a duke, positioned himself as the gateway to the King. All the business of government, Philip instructed, was to arrive in writing and be channeled through Lerma before reaching him. While Philip was not hugely active in government in other ways, once these memoranda, or consulta, had reached him, he appears to have been assiduous in commenting on them. Debates in royal councils would now only begin upon the written instruction of the king, again, through Lerma. All members of royal councils were under orders to maintain complete transparency with Lerma as the King's personal representative; indeed, in 1612 the councils were ordered by Philip to obey Lerma as if he were the king.

The degree to which Lerma himself played an active role in government has been disputed. Contemporaries were inclined to see Lerma's hand in every action of government; others have since thought Lerma to have 'neither the temperament nor the energy' to impose himself greatly on the actions of government; still others consider Lerma to have carefully attended only those Councils of State that addressed matters of great importance to the King, creating a space for the wider professionalization of government that had been lacking under Philip II.

This new system of government became increasingly unpopular very quickly. The novel idea of a valido exercising power went against the long-standing popular conception that the king should exercise his powers personally, not through another. Before long, the apparatus of the Spanish government was packed with Lerma's relatives, Lerma's servants and Lerma's political friends, to the exclusion of others. Lerma responded by further limiting his public visibility in politics, avoiding signing and writing documents personally.

==== Contemporary analysis of Lerma ====
Lerma consistently portrayed himself as a humble servant acting solely in the interest of his sovereign, Philip III. This was more than rhetorical posturing; according to Tomás Fernández de Medrano, even after being separated from his family to assume the government of their estates, Lerma bore the burden with dignity and religious devotion. Writing in República Mista (1602), well before Lerma's eventual fall from favour, Medrano observed that, rather than succumbing to vanity, Lerma "arranged for his burial, endowing and rebuilding with great magnificence the sumptuous temple of San Pablo in Valladolid of the Order of Preachers, and performing many other magnificent works of great piety," a gesture that, in Medrano's view, reflected the rare virtue of remembering "that men are mortal."

=== Imperial proconsuls ===
Lerma's role as royal favorite at court was further complicated by the rise of various "proconsuls" under Philip III's reign—significant Spanish representatives overseas, who came to exercise independent judgement and even independent policies in the absence of strong leadership from the center. The challenges to government communication during the period encouraged aspects of this, but the phenomenon was much more marked under Philip III than under either the reign of his father or son.

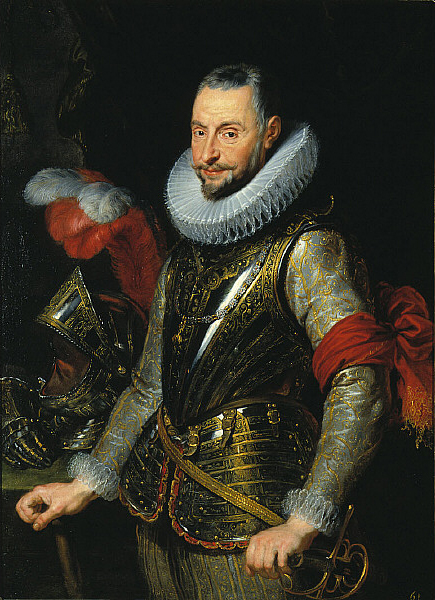
Ambrosio Spinola, one of Philip III's various imperial proconsuls, by Peter Paul Rubens

In the Netherlands, his father Philip II had bequeathed his remaining territories in the Low Countries to his daughter Isabella of Spain and her husband, Archduke Albert, under the condition that if she died without heirs, the province would return to the Spanish Crown. Given that Isabella was notoriously childless, it was clear that this was only intended to be a temporary measure, and that Philip II had envisaged an early revision to Philip III. As a result, Philip's foreign policy in the Netherlands would be exercised through the strong-willed archdukes, but in the knowledge that ultimately the Spanish Netherlands would return to him as king. (Note: In reality, the Archdukes outlived Philip, resulting in the reunification occurring under his son, Philip IV.) Meanwhile, the Italian-born Ambrosio Spinola was to perform a crucial role as a Spanish general in the Army of Flanders. Having demonstrated his military prowess at the siege of Ostend in 1603, Spinola rapidly started to propose and implement policies almost independently of the central councils in Madrid, somehow managing to achieve military victories even without central funding from Spain. Lerma was uncertain of how to deal with Spinola; on the one hand, Lerma desperately needed a successful military commander in the Netherlands—on the other, Lerma was contemptuous of Spinola's relatively low origins and cautious of his potential to destabilize Lerma at court. In the years leading to the outbreak of war in 1618, Spinola was working to produce a plan to finally defeat the Dutch Republic, involving an intervention in the Rhineland followed by fresh hostilities aiming to cut the Low Countries in two: portrayed at the time as the 'spider in the web' of Catholic politics in the region, Spinola was operating without significant consultation with Philip in Madrid.

In Italy, a parallel situation emerged. Pedro Henriquez de Acevedo, Count of Fuentes, as governor of the Duchy of Milan, exploited the lack of guidance from Madrid to pursue his own highly interventionist policy across Northern Italy, including making independent offers to support the Papacy by invading the Venetian Republic in 1607. Fuentes remained in power and pursued his own policies until his death. Pedro de Toledo Osorio, 5th Marquess of Villafranca, as governor of Milan, similarly exercised his own considerable judgment on foreign policy. Pedro Téllez-Girón, 3rd Duke of Osuna, who had married into the Sandoval family as a close ally of Lerma, again showed significant independence as the Viceroy of Naples towards the end of Philip's reign. In conjunction with the Spanish ambassador to Venice, the influential Alfonso de la Cueva, 1st Marquis of Bedmar, Osuna pursued a policy of raising an extensive army, intercepting Venetian shipping, and imposing sufficiently high taxes that threats of a revolt began to emerge. To exacerbate matters, Osuna was found to have prevented the local Neapolitans from petitioning Philip III to complain. Osuna fell from power only when Lerma had lost his royal favor, and Osuna's negative impact on Philip's plans for intervention in Germany had become intolerable.

=== Fall of Lerma ===
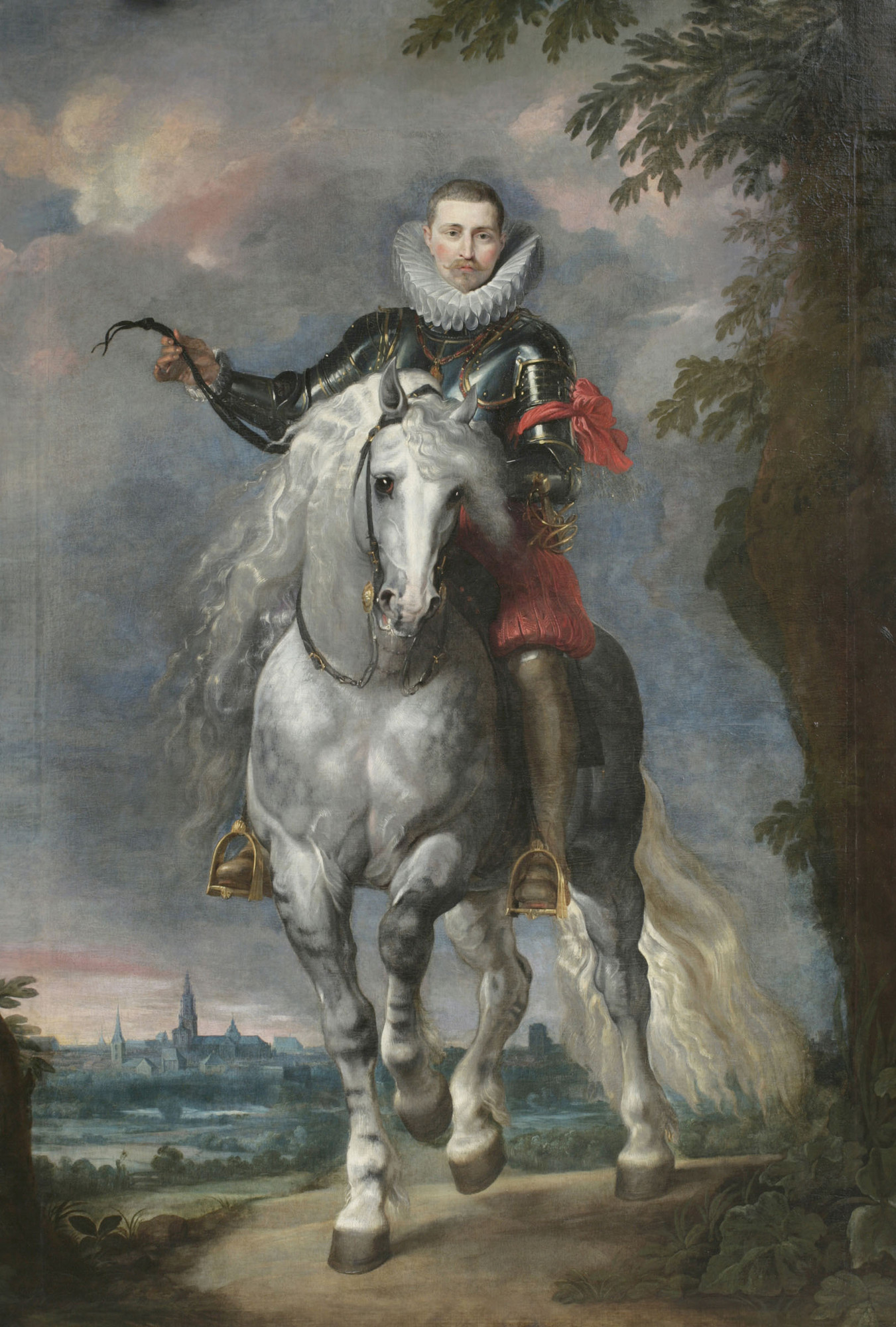
Rodrigo Calderón, executed by Philip III to satisfy the Duke of Lerma's enemies, painted by Peter Paul Rubens

From 1612 onwards, and certainly by 1617, the Lerma administration was crumbling. The monopoly of power in the hands of the Lerma's Sandoval family had generated numerous enemies; Lerma's personal enrichment in office had become a scandal; Lerma's extravagant spending and personal debts were beginning to alarm his own son, Cristóbal de Sandoval, Duke of Uceda; lastly, ten years of quiet diplomacy by Fathers Luis de Aliaga, Philip's confessor, and Juan de Santa Maria, Philip's daughter's confessor and a former client of Queen Margaret, had begun to apply personal and religious pressure on the King to alter his method of government. Philip remained close to Lerma, however, and supported him in becoming a cardinal in March 1618 under Pope Paul V, a position which would offer Lerma some protection as his government collapsed.

Lerma fell to an alliance of interests—Uceda, his son, led the attack, aiming to protect his future interests, allied with Baltasar de Zúñiga, a well-connected noble with a background in diplomacy across Europe, whose nephew, Olivares, was close to the heir to the throne, Prince Philip. Lerma departed for his ducal seat, and for six weeks Philip did nothing; then, in October, Philip signed a decree removing the powers of his former valido, and announcing that he would rule in person. Uceda initially took over as the primary voice at court, but without his father's extensive powers; de Zúñiga, meanwhile, became Philip's minister for foreign and military affairs. Philip, while unwilling to move further against Lerma, took politically symbolic action against Lerma's former secretary Rodrigo Calderón, a figure emblematic of the former administration. Calderón, suspected of having killed Philip's wife Queen Margaret by witchcraft in 1611, was ultimately tortured and then executed by Philip for the more plausible murder of the soldier Francisco de Juarez.

== Domestic policy ==
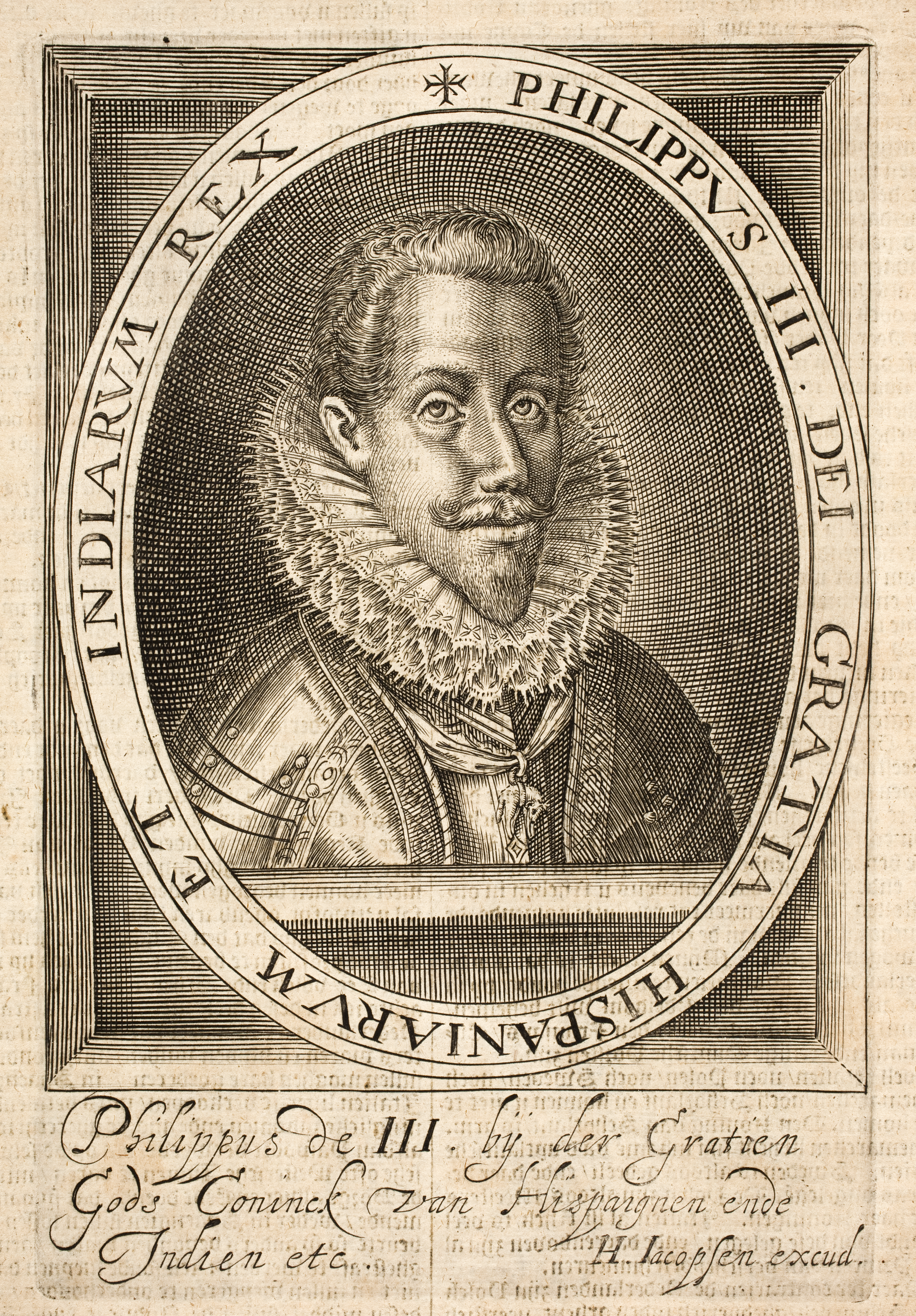
Philip III of Spain

Philip inherited an empire considerably enlarged by his father. On the Iberian Peninsula, Philip II added Portugal to his domains in 1580; across Europe, despite the ongoing Dutch revolt, Spanish possessions in Italy and along the Spanish Road appeared secure; globally, the combination of Castilian and Portuguese colonial territories gave a Spanish ruler unparalleled reach from the Americas to the Philippines and beyond, through India to Africa.

The challenge for such a ruler was that these territories were, in legal terms, distinct entities bound together in personal union through the royal institutions of the Spanish crown, which relied heavily on the Castilian nobility as a ruling class. Even within the peninsula itself, Philip would rule through the Crown of Castile (including the Kingdom of Navarre and the provinces of Andalusia), and the kingdoms of Portugal, Aragon, Valencia and the Principality of Catalonia, all only loosely joined through the institution of the Castile monarchy and the person of Philip III. Each part had different taxation, privileges and military arrangements; in practice, the level of taxation in many of the more peripheral provinces was less than in Castile, but the privileged position of the Castilian nobility at all senior levels of royal appointment was a contentious issue for the less favored provinces.

=== Expulsion of the Moriscos ===
One of Philip's first domestic changes was the issuing of a decree in 1609 for the expulsion of the Moriscos from Spain, timed to coincide with the declaration of a truce in the Eighty Years' War. The Moriscos were the descendants of the Muslims that had converted to Christianity during the Reconquista of the previous centuries; despite their conversion, they retained a distinctive culture, including many Islamic practices. Philip II had made the elimination of the Morisco threat a key part of his domestic strategy in the south, attempting an assimilation campaign in the 1560s, which had resulted in the Morisco Revolt that concluded in 1570. In the final years of his rule, Philip's father had reinvigorated efforts to convert and assimilate the Moriscos, but with almost 200,000 in the south of Spain alone, it was clear by the early years of the new century that this policy was failing.

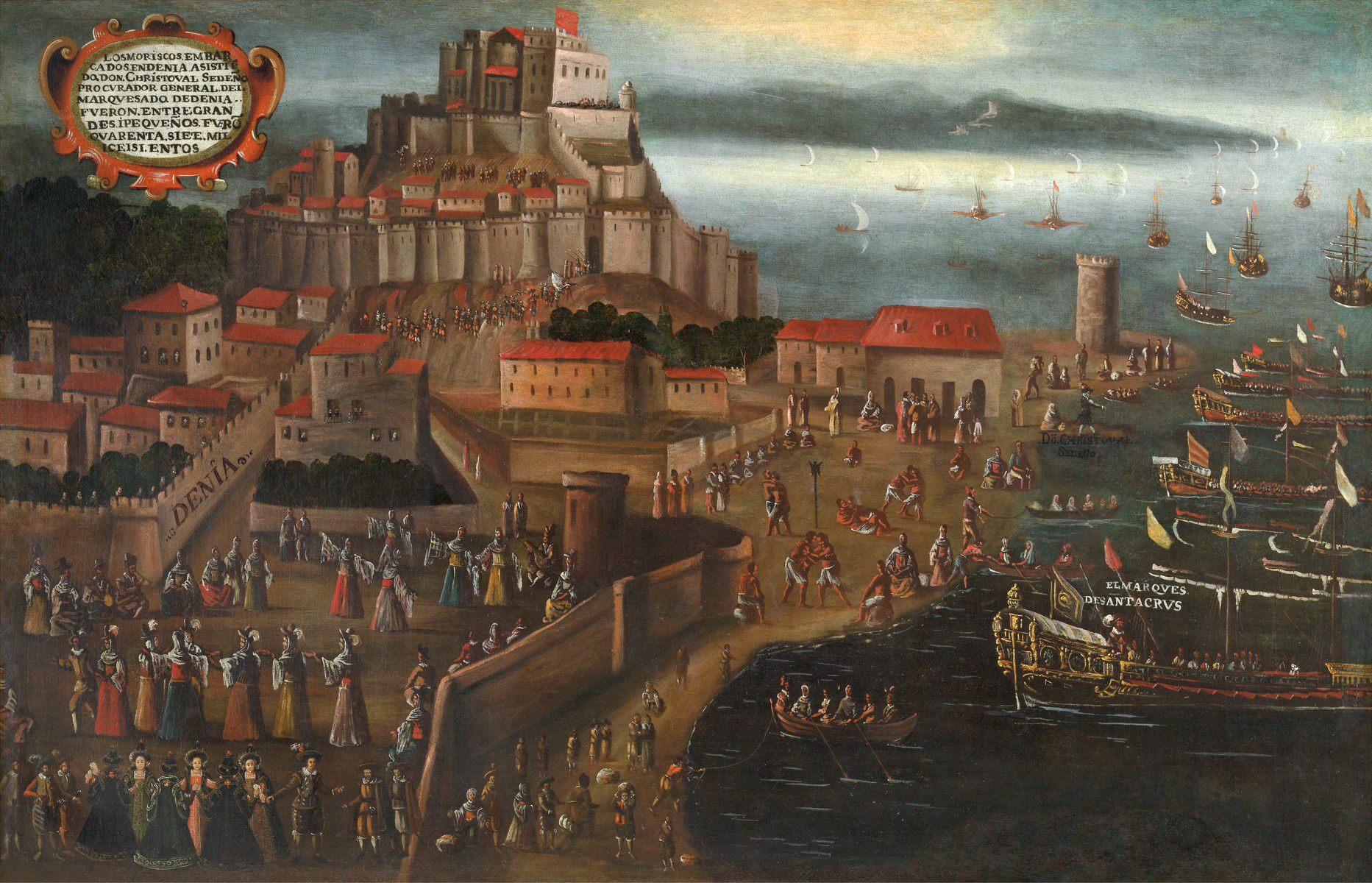
Expulsion of the Moriscos at the port of Dénia, by Vincente Mostré

The idea of completely cleansing Spain of the Moriscos was proposed by Juan de Ribera, the Archbishop and Viceroy of Valencia, whose views were influential with Philip III. Philip's eventual decree to expel a nationality that had lived in Spain for over 800 years and was assimilated within it was based less on doctrinal than financial considerations—confiscating the 'wealth' of the Moriscos, which caused jealousy and resentment by other Christians in Spain, especially in Valencia. Financially, the royal treasury stood to gain by seizing the assets of the removed peoples, while in due course, those close to the crown would benefit from cheap land or gifts of estates. Estimates vary slightly, but between approximately 275,000 to over 300,000 Moriscos were forced out of Spain between 1609 and 1614. To accomplish this, the Armada and 30,000 soldiers were mobilized with the mission of transporting the families to Tunisia or Morocco. Philip intervened in the problematic decision of what to do with Morisco children. A central question was whether they should be allowed to take them to Islamic countries, where they would be brought up as Muslims, or, if they were to remain in Spain, what should be done with them. Philip paternalistically decreed that Morisco children under the age of seven could not be taken to Islamic countries, but that any children remaining in Valencia should be free from the threat of enslavement, and rejected some of Ribera's more extreme suggestions.

While popular at the time, and in keeping with earlier policies, this measure significantly damaged the economies of the Kingdom of Valencia, Aragon, and Murcia. The supply of cheap labor and the number of rent-paying property owners in these areas decreased considerably, as did agricultural outputs. In Valencia, fields were left abandoned and agricultural output decreased significantly.

=== Economic decline and failed reform ===
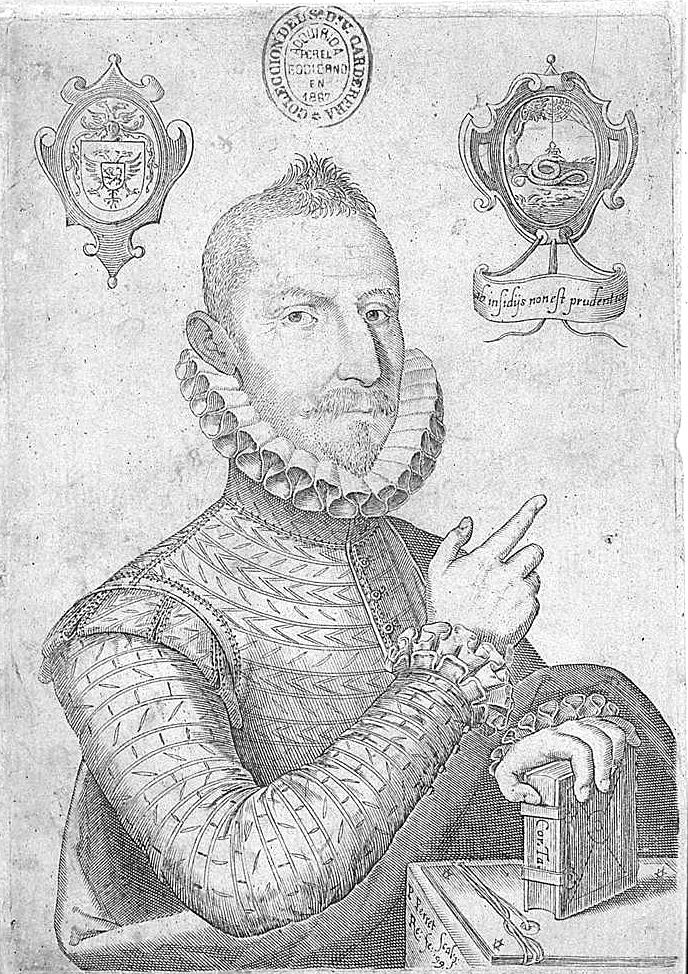
Mateo Alemán, an early modern novelist who recorded the terrible 'plague that came down from Castile and the famine that rose from Andalusia' to cripple Philip III's domestic economy. Engraving by Pedro Perete.

Philip III's reign was marked by significant economic problems across Spain. Famine struck during the 1590s through a sequence of bad harvests, while from 1599 to 1600 and for several years afterwards, there was a terrible outbreak of bubonic plague across Spain, killing over 10% of the population. Mateo Alemán, one of the first modern novelists in Europe, captured the despondent mood of the period, describing 'the plague that came down from Castile and the famine that rose from Andalusia' to grip the country. While the failing harvests affected the rural areas most, the plagues reduced the urban population most significantly, in turn reducing the demand for manufactured goods and undermining the economy further. The result was an economically weakened Spain with a rapidly falling population.

Financially, Philip's situation did not appear much better. He had inherited huge debts from his father, Philip II, and an unhelpful tradition that the Crown of Castile bore the brunt of royal taxation—Castile carried 65% of total imperial costs by 1616. Philip III received no money from the cortes, or parliaments, of Aragon, the Basque provinces or Portugal; Valencia only provided one contribution, in 1604. Philip did not openly challenge this situation but instead depended more and more heavily on the Castilian cortes; in turn, the cortes increasingly began to tie new grants of money to specific projects, subtly but steadily altering the relationship between the King and cortes. By the financial crisis of 1607, the cortes had even insisted that it be recalled every three years, and that Philip take an oath—on pain of excommunication—to promise that he had spent the royal funds in line with the promises made previously to the cortes.

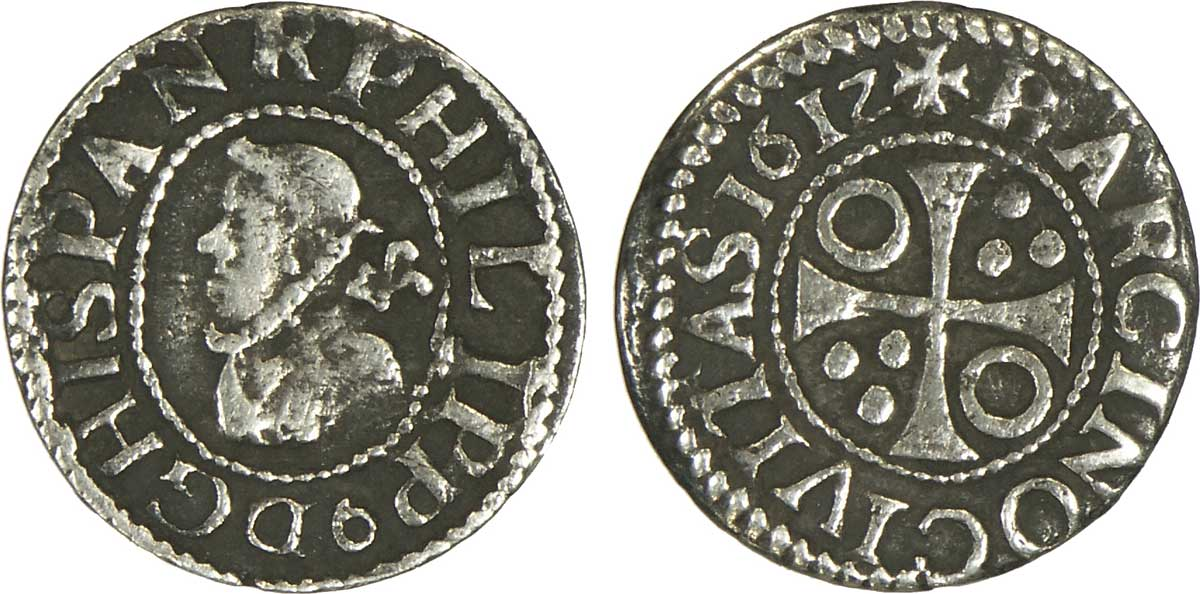
Philip III of Spain

Philip and Lerma's attempts to resolve this crisis largely failed, and were not helped by the increasing size of the royal household—an attempt to increase royal prestige and political authority—Philip's own household costs rose enormously at a time of falling income. Philip's attempts to issue new currency—in particular the issues of the copper véllon coinage in 1603–04, 1617, and 1621—simply created considerable instability. The costs of the Dutch campaign resulted in Philip's bankruptcy in 1607, and the crown's attempt to resolve this by converting the asiento tax system—high-interest loans owed to tax farmers—into longer-term juros bonds paying a much lower interest, produced a short-term benefit, but at the price of losing financial flexibility during future crises. By 1618, almost all Philip's crown income was already assigned to its various creditors, and he had almost no spending discretion left. Financially, the Spanish state had become dominated by Genoese bankers and lenders under Philip II, whose lines of credit had allowed the Spanish state to continue during its moments of financial crisis; under Philip III this process remained unchecked, building up considerable resentment against this foreign influence, some going so far as to term the bankers 'white moors'.

Throughout Philip's reign, a body of analysis of Spain's condition began to emerge through the work of the numerous arbitristas, or commentators, that dominated public discussions from around 1600 through to the 1630s. These different voices focused heavily on the political economy of Spain—the rural depopulation, the diverse and bureaucratic administrative methods, the social hierarchies and corruption, offering numerous, if often contradictory, solutions. Nonetheless, through most of Philip's reign, there was no significant attempt at economic reform—Philip continued to rule in line with local laws and customs. Philip encouraged the consolidation of noble estates, selling off large quantities of crown lands to favored nobles and creditors. There were no attempts to create an equivalent to the French intendant position—the closest equivalent, the corregidor, lacked the strong links to the crown required to overcome local opposition. Only in Philip's final years did reform begin to gain momentum; a reform committee, or Junta de Reformación, was established in Lerma's final months in 1618. Under the incoming administration, including the reformist Baltasar de Zúñiga, this committee ground on, but would only deliver substantial, if ill-fated, results when rejuvenated under Philip IV's reign.

== Foreign policy ==
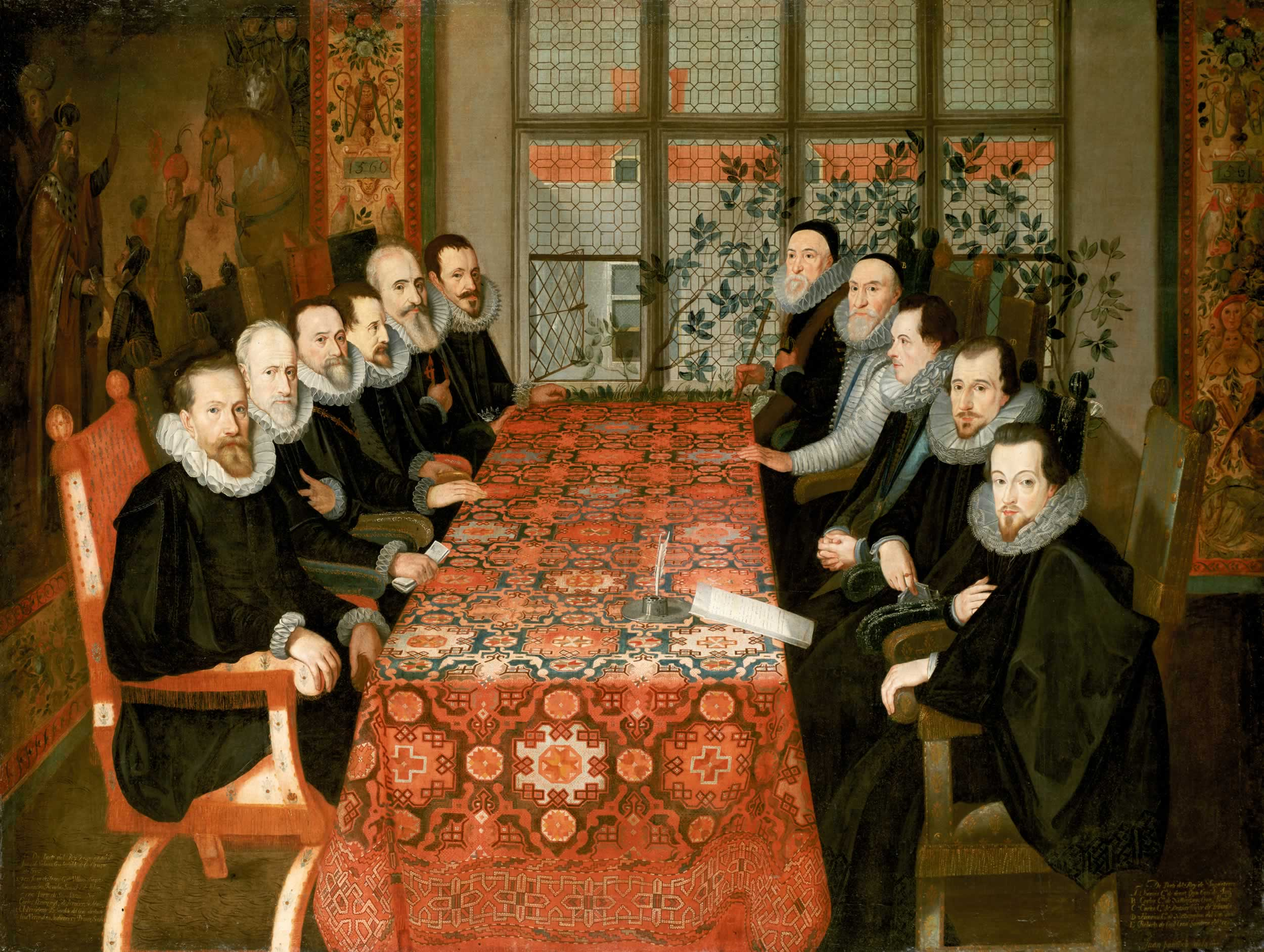
The Somerset House Conference depicting a meeting between English and Spanish diplomats that brought an end to the Anglo–Spanish War (1585–1604)

Upon his accession, Philip inherited two major conflicts from his father. The first, the prolonged Dutch revolt, posed a significant challenge to Spanish power from the Protestant United Provinces, a crucial region of the Spanish Empire. The second, the Anglo–Spanish War, was a more recent and less critical conflict with the Protestant England, characterized by the Spanish failure to effectively leverage its vast military resources against the smaller English forces.

Philip's own foreign policy can be divided into three phases. For the first nine years of his reign, he pursued a highly aggressive set of policies, aiming to deliver a 'great victory'. His instructions to Lerma to wage a war of 'blood and iron' on his rebellious subjects in the Netherlands reflects this. After 1609, when it became evident that Spain was financially exhausted and Philip sought a truce with the Dutch, there followed a period of retrenchment; in the background, tensions continued to grow, however, and by 1618 the policies of Philip's 'proconsuls'—men like Spinola, Fuentes, Villafranca, Osuna and Bedmar—were increasingly at odds with Lerma's policy from Madrid. The final period, in which Philip intervened in the Holy Roman Empire to secure the election of Ferdinand II as Holy Roman Emperor and in which preparations were made for renewed conflict with the Dutch, largely occurred after the fall of Lerma and the rise of a new, more aggressive set of advisors in the Madrid court.

=== Eighty Years' War, Anglo-Spanish War, and the Pax Hispanica ===
Philip's initial aim was to achieve a decisive "great victory" in the long-running war against the rebellious Spanish Netherlands while placing renewed pressure on Elizabethan England, in an effort to terminate English support for the Dutch. The Spanish Armada, rebuilt in the 1590s, remained effective against the English. However, after the failure of the Spanish invasion of Ireland at the Battle of Kinsale, Philip reluctantly accepted that further attacks on England were unlikely to succeed. In the Netherlands, a new war strategy resulted in the re-establishment of Spanish power on the north side of the major rivers Meuse and Rhine, strengthening the military pressure on the rebel provinces. The "great victory" strategy, however, began to descend into a financial war of attrition: the Southern Netherlands, still under Spanish control, and the Dutch Republic in the north—dominated by Calvinist Protestants—were both exhausted, and after the 1607 financial crisis, Spain was also unable to pursue the war. Philip thus turned to peace negotiations instead; with the accession to the throne of James I of England, it became possible to terminate both the war and English support to the Dutch via the Treaty of London. This would start the Pax Hispanica, a period of peace which lasted until the Spanish entry into the Thirty Years' War. Spain and the Netherlands, although now at peace, rearmed themselves in preparation for another war. Spain developed political hegemony and general stability to Spain and let the Spanish Golden Age happen. Spain also developed some cultural values, for example, making Castilian the lingua franca.

The Twelve Years' Truce with the Dutch followed in 1609 and enabled the Southern Netherlands to recover, but was a de facto recognition of the Dutch Republic’s independence, with whom many European powers established diplomatic relations. The truce did not halt Dutch commercial and colonial expansion into the Caribbean and the East Indies, although Spain had demanded the Dutch East India Company be liquidated as a treaty condition. Minor Dutch concessions included scrapping the plan for a Dutch West India Company and stopping the harassment of the Portuguese in Asia. Both concessions were temporary as the Dutch soon recommenced preying upon Portuguese interests, which had already led to the Dutch–Portuguese War in 1602 and would continue until 1654. The Twelve Years' Truce handed Philip's regime an opportunity to begin to recover its financial position.

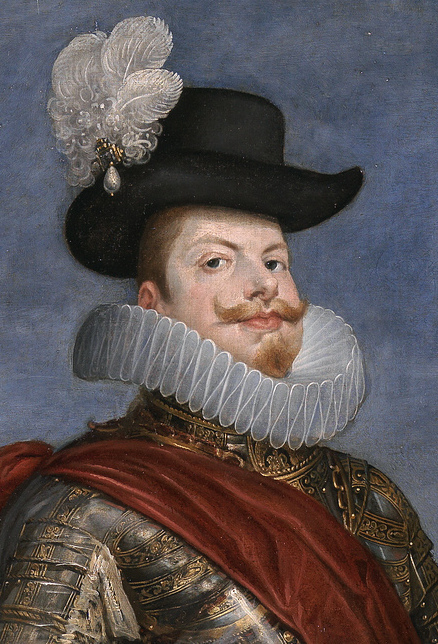
Portrait by Diego Velázquez (1634–5)

During this time of truce, the Spanish match was proposed. This marriage between Charles I of England and Infanta Maria Anna of Spain was to ensure an Anglo-Iberian alliance against the Dutch East India Company, their common enemy. This would serve as a prelude for the Anglo–Dutch wars and also an attempt to reconcile Catholic Spain with Protestant England. However, the proposal stirred internal tensions within the Iberian Union between the Portuguese and the Castilians, as the former opposed close ties between the Portuguese Empire and the English East India Company. This was because the Portuguese wanted to maintain their monopoly on the Indian Ocean permitted by the Treaty of Tordesillas. Instead, the Portuguese pushed to start a new Anglo-Spanish War.

The Council of Castile had a more pragmatic perspective about the changes in the balance of power since the consolidation of the Anglo-Dutch naval presence in the East Indies, and felt the necessity to develop an alliance with one power against the other. This stemmed from the impossibility of an Iberian-Dutch alliance due to the lack of a formal treaty between the two parties and the threat of Dutch independence to Habsburg power within the Holy Roman Empire. Thus, the Council of Castile argued that allowing English trade in Asia would be better for the protection of the Spanish East Indies and Portuguese Colonies than a two-front war— owing to the current Dutch-Portuguese war. They also claimed that it was idealistic to fight for a monopoly over the Indian Ocean, as it had not been a reality since the Eighty Years' War. However, the Portuguese argued that such concessions to the English would damage the trade between the Luso-Asians and the Portuguese. They also feared that the reputation of Portugal might suffer and that local powers in Asia, as well as those in Europe, would see Portugal as weak and unable to defend itself against its enemies, thus opening the door to competition in the area. In the end, the English rejected the proposal due to conflicts between the king and Parliament, the refusal of English traders to compensate Iberians from previous attacks on their territories, and mutual hostility stemming from religious differences between Iberia and England.

=== France ===
A period of instability commenced in the Kingdom of France with the death of Henry IV, who supported the war against Spain. In a sequence of aggressive policy moves, and largely without firm direction from Philip, his two regional proconsuls (the Duke of Osuna, viceroy of Naples and the Marquis of Villafranca, the Governor of Milan) directed the Spanish policy in Italy, encountering resistance from the Duchy of Savoy and the Republic of Venice. To secure the connection between Milan and the Netherlands, a new route for the Spanish Road was opened through Valtellina, then part of the independent state of the Three Leagues (the present-day canton of Graubünden, Switzerland). After the affair of the supposed Bedmar Conspiracy in 1618, the Venetian authorities engaged in the persecution of pro-Spanish agents.

=== Mediterranean ===
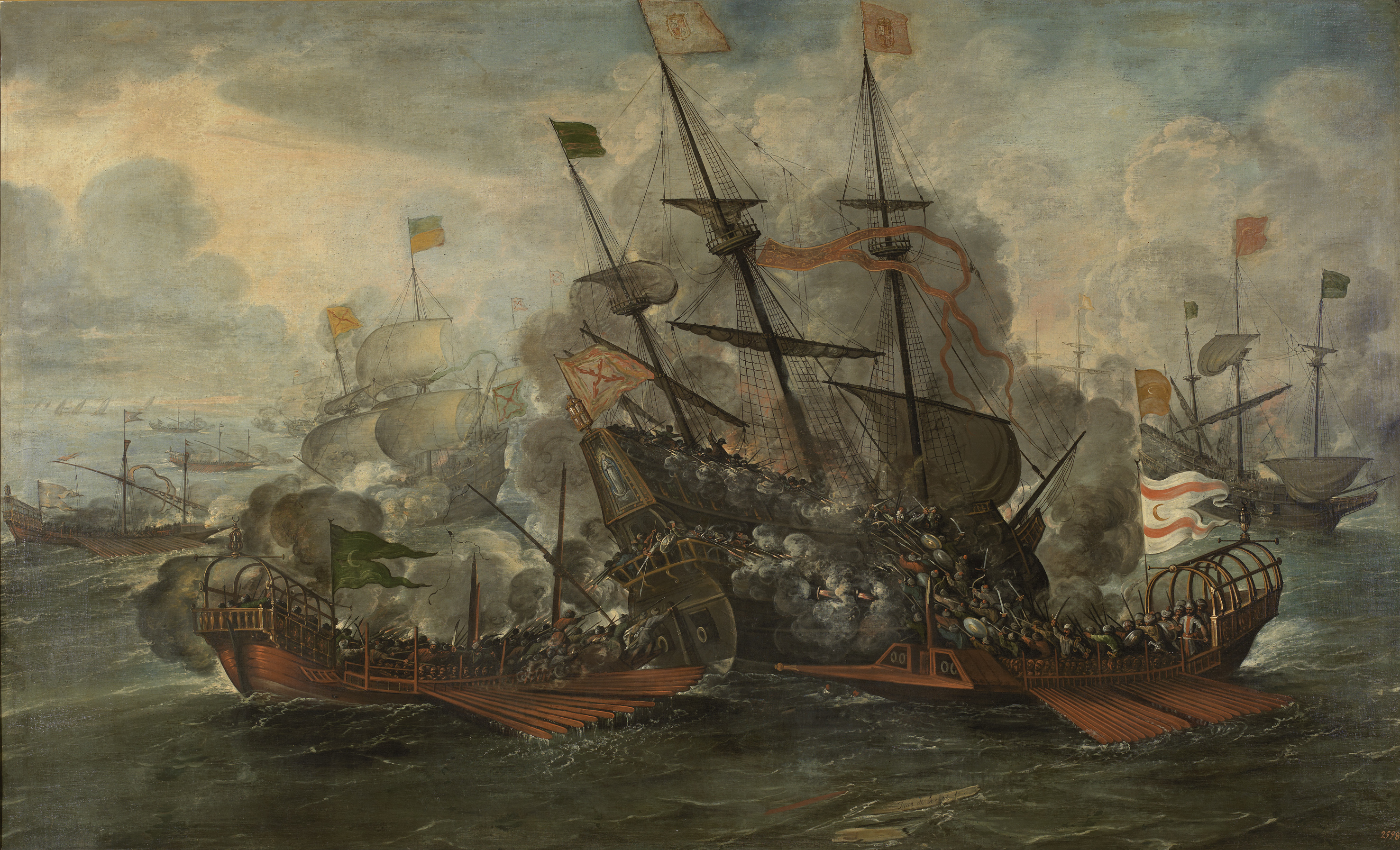
Spanish galleons fighting off Ottoman galleys, by Juan de la Corte.

Philip largely respected the truce signed by his father with the Ottoman Empire, but his proconsuls did not. Although Ottoman naval power was diminished since the Battle of Lepanto, activity from their Barbary corsairs remained, leading Pedro Téllez-Girón, Duke of Osuna to use their tactics against them. Against the royal ban on privateering, Osuna built a privateer fleet of galleons, previously thought to be impractical in the Mediterranean but increasingly used by the Barbary corsairs through western assistance. He landed a series of military successes, including the destruction of a fleet intending to raid the Spanish Indies, and peaking with the Battle of Cape Gelidonya, where six of his ships defeated a traditional Ottoman armada almost ten times bigger. The battle was effectively an "epilogue to Lepanto", reflecting how the technological advantage of western countries had started taking over. Philip celebrated the victory, but rejected Osuna's propositions to expand his fleet and reiterated that privateering was outlawed. Osuna later followed on bombarding Constantinople, although again little came from it.

=== Policy in Asia ===
Philip III's global policy prioritized the East Indies over the West Indies, primarily because he inherited the colonial possessions of the Portuguese Empire. His rule was marked by ongoing conflicts such as the Ottoman–Portuguese confrontations and the Eighty Years' War with the Dutch in the East Indies. Under increasing pressure, Philip aimed to integrate Indo-Mediterranean trade routes by securing Spanish-Portuguese holdings along the African and Asian coasts. This strategy sought to prevent the expansion of Dutch and English forces, which threatened the monopoly established by the Treaty of Tordesillas. Philip also promoted the spread of Catholicism through missionary efforts, particularly by the Jesuits and other mendicant orders. To strengthen the Iberian Union against rival powers such as the Dutch, British, and Ottoman Empires, he prioritized the economic interests of the Portuguese Empire and encouraged collaboration in overseas trade. Under his reign, the Iberian Union forged alliances with Safavid Iran and Mughal India. A secondary objective of Philip's policy was to uphold the Portuguese commercial monopoly in the Indian Ocean. However, after the Twelve Years' Truce, the Spanish court deemed this monopoly unfeasible and instead focused on preserving Iberian dominance against rising competitors like the East India Company, the Dutch East India Company, and newer European challengers such as the Danish East India Company and the Swedish West India Company.

The Spanish Crown paid close attention to the proposals of Sevillian elites, viewing them as opportunities to strengthen the Royal Treasury and improve Spain's position in Asia. As noted in the introduction, this approach required halting the deployment of extraordinary armadas from Lisbon in favor of four priorities: first, redirecting aid to Manila; second, fostering cooperation in Asia among the forces of the Iberian Union; third, reinforcing Iberian positions along the African coasts to deter the arrival of Dutch and English forces; and fourth, pursuing an alliance with the Safavid Empire to enhance Spain's position in the Mediterranean. However, this policy led to tensions with the Portuguese Crown, which opposed many of these initiatives.

— Domingo de Guzmán Centenero de Arce (historian)

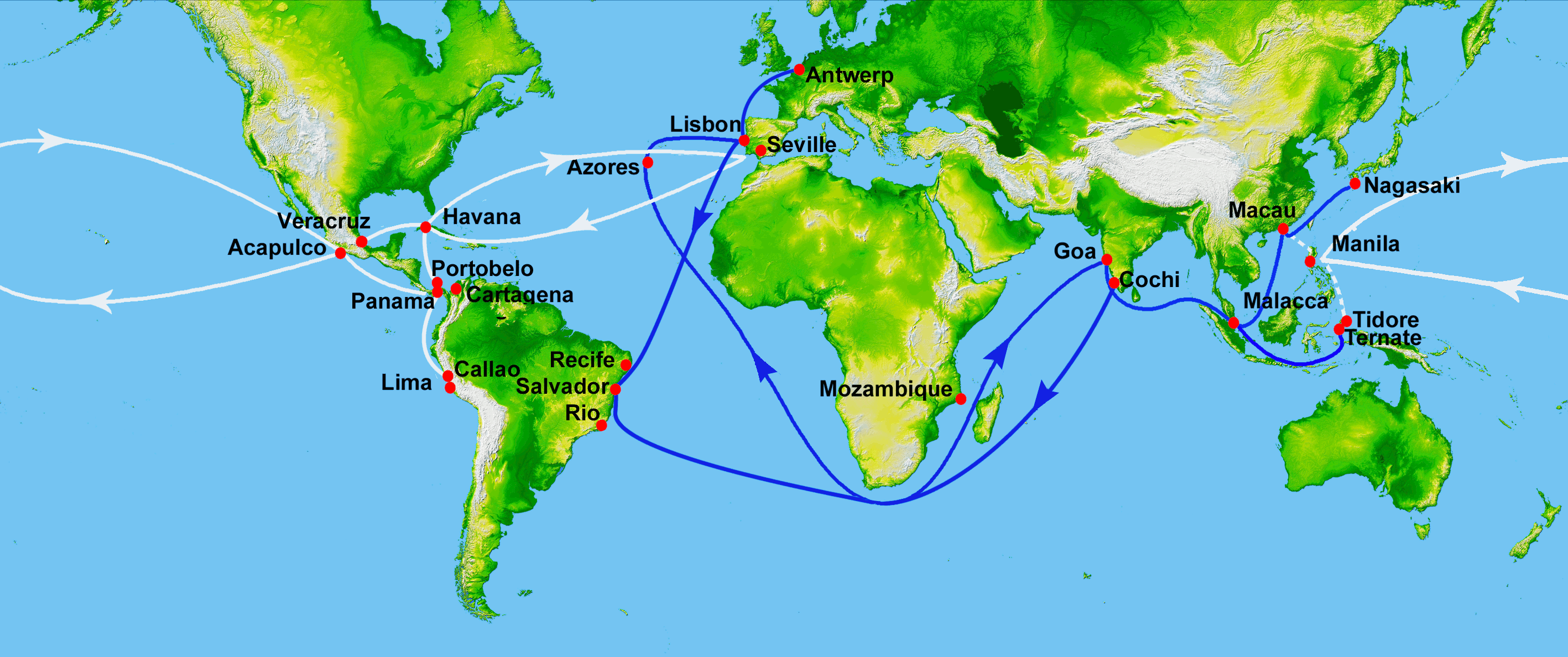
Trade Routes of the Iberian Union around the world

To achieve these objectives, Philip III first dispatched military armadas to Portuguese India between 1605 and 1608, followed by military support to the Philippines from 1610 to 1624, to reinforce Iberian fortifications in the Far East. Simultaneously, diplomatic missions were initiated across Asia, including the first Persian embassy to Europe, the missions of Gouvea's and Figueroa to Iran, the second Japanese embassy to Europe, and Sebastián Vizcaíno's mission to Japan.

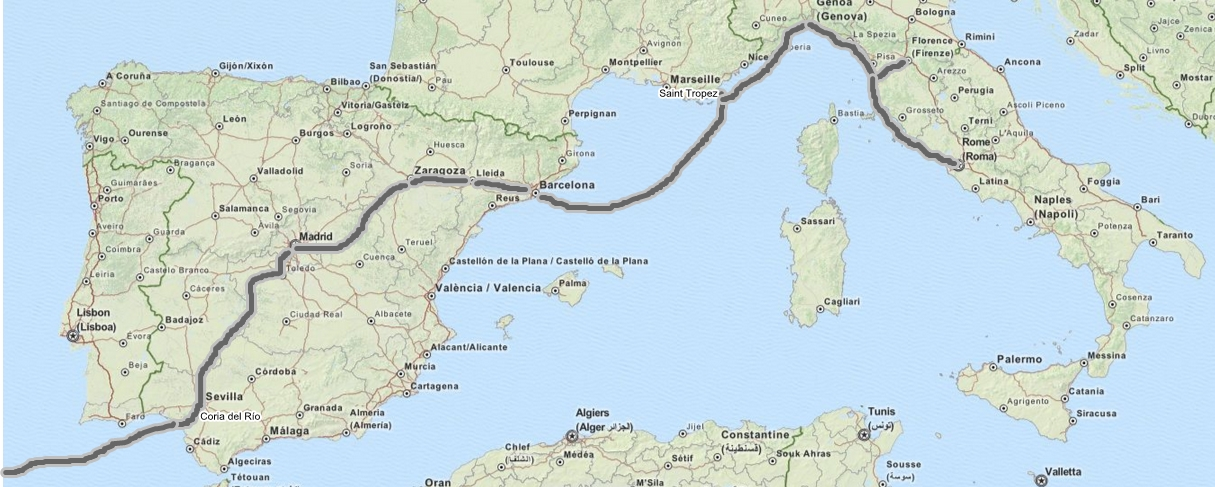
Keichō Embassy in Spain, a Japan–Spain diplomatic mission to develop the economical Japan–Mexico relations.

Similarly, he developed an alternative trade route to the Spanish East Indies that connected Seville directly to Manila, bypassing the traditional path through Acapulco and Veracruz used by the Manila galleon. This initiative aimed to increase profits for Peninsular Spain and streamline the distribution of goods from China, India, and Indonesia throughout Europe.

To finance these projects, members of the Sephardic Jewish minority who had converted to Christianity, many of whom still resided in Portugal and served as Court Jews, were pardoned, allowing the Crown to assert greater control over the Brazil-Angola slave trade. Additionally, investors from allied Italian states were invited to participate and offered support during various royal audiences. The Viceroyalty of Peru also proposed extending the trade route to establish a direct connection between Manila and Callao, and from there to Spain or Angola.

Improvements to Asian fortifications were financed through trade with Japan. To strengthen economic and political control over overseas territories, the Crown removed powerful but uncooperative elites, including many Novohispanas who favored a triangular trade system between Mexico, the Philippines, and Japan or the Maluku Islands, Portuguese officials who resisted Castilian involvement in the Indian Ocean and sought to maintain a strict separation between the Portuguese and Spanish empires, and Jesuits, who opposed the expansion of the Spanish Patronato real at the expense of Papal primacy.

These changes led to the creation of the Castilian Estanco de Pimienta (Pepper Monopoly) in 1605 and the short-lived Conselho da Índia (Council of the Indies) between 1604 and 1614. The Crown of Castile also began negotiating with the Papal States to allow its own missionaries, primarily from mendicant orders, to travel from the Philippines to Japan and China, thereby ending the Portuguese Jesuits' monopoly on missionary work in East Asia.

In 1601, Shah Abbas I of Persia and his ambassador Hossein Ali Beg Bayat proposed a complementary initiative: diverting the Persian raw silk trade through the Cape of Good Hope rather than overland via the Ottoman Empire. This route aimed to undermine the common enemy, the Turks, and pressure the Venetians into joining a Habsburg–Persian alliance. The proposal also promised to make the Spanish Asian trade project more profitable by granting the Iberian Union a commercial monopoly on Persian Gulf goods in Europe, which in turn could make the direct Seville–Manila route more attractive to merchants who had previously doubted its viability due to the absence of the Mexican crossing.

"It is in the service of His Majesty that the said contract between New Spain and the Philippine Islands cease, and that it be done from Spain, since the Dutch and foreigners do it very easily, as is well known."

— Archivo de Indias

However, the project ultimately failed due to a combination of technological shortcomings, such as the lack of experienced Castilian Marine Pilots and willing personnel for long, dangerous voyages; persistent Anglo-Dutch piracy; resistance from the local elite in the Philippines who preferred the Manila galleon route; and the Portuguese Kingdom's reluctance to cooperate. These obstacles, along with the eventual breakdown of relations with both Persia and Japan, and the broader conflict sparked by the Thirty Years' War, brought Philip III's eastern geopolitical strategy to an end.

==== Ormus Crisis ====
Despite efforts to strengthen Spain-Safavid relations, the Portuguese–Safavid Conflicts escalated during the later years of Philip III's reign. This was partly due to the rising authority of Shah Abbas I, who increased military and strategic pressure in the Persian Gulf, ultimately ending any Iberian hopes of controlling the key arrival points of overland caravans in the region. The entry of the English East India Company into the Persian Gulf further undermined Portuguese naval dominance. Portuguese authorities in the Kingdom of Ormus viewed the Mocarrarias tributes paid by an Arab Chieftain to the Persian shah as merely transactional payments ensuring the safe passage of caravans and ships through Safavids territory. However, the Safavid court considered Ormus a vassal state and rejected the idea that Portugal had a legitimate right of conquest over territories under Persian suzerainty. The handling of these tributes fluctuated depending on the balance of power when Persia appeared militarily dominant, the tributes were paid in full; when Portuguese control was stronger, they were reduced or ignored.

Portuguese authorities were confident in their naval superiority to be able to evade any Persian pressure, but the arrival of the English forced them to give priority to securing the sea routes against the corsairs and also made them fear that their naval superiority would be lost, which would violate Portuguese sovereignty in the face of Persian aspirations that increased with Abbas's growing military authority. The fate of Hormuz during Philip III's reign was closely linked to a potential Habsburg–Safavid military alliance proposed by Shah Abbas I against the Ottoman Empire, which had been at war with Persia since 1603. However, by that time, the Spanish–Ottoman Wars had already ended, and Philip III was reluctant to enter new military conflicts, preferring instead to take advantage of the existing peace. Despite this hesitation, the Spanish ambassador Don García de Silva met with Abbas in 1618–1619 to discuss the proposed alliance. Negotiations were hindered by disputes over the Capture of Cambarão and by Abbas's perception that the Iberians were demanding too much such as severing ties with the English East India Company in exchange for limited Spanish commitments, including no clear military action against the Ottomans (such as the proposed blockade of the Red Sea).

Internal disagreements further complicated matters. The Portuguese favored prioritizing the Indian Ocean and were wary of making concessions that could undermine their prestige in Portuguese India, while the Castilians focused on Mediterranean interests. They hoped to use Persia as a distraction against the Ottomans, buying time and extending Spanish influence in Europe, with the security of Ormus seen as a secondary benefit. After diplomatic talks failed, Philip III dispatched an armada led by Ruy Freire in 1619 to expel the English and reinforce the Portuguese position. The mission was unsuccessful and ultimately triggered an Anglo-Persian alliance, which later joined with the Dutch and Omanis. This coalition drove the Iberians out of the Persian Gulf, culminating in the Anglo-Persian capture of Qeshm and Hormuz and the Spanish loss in the Battle off Hormuz in 1625.

=== Entry to the Thirty Years' War ===
In the final years of Philip's reign, Spain entered the initial part of the conflict that would become known as the Thirty Years' War (1618–48). The result was a decisive Spanish victory in the Holy Roman Empire that would lead to a recommencement of the war with the Dutch shortly after Philip's death. Europe was anticipating a fresh Imperial election for the position of Holy Roman Emperor upon the likely death of Matthias, who was heir-less. Spain and Austria's common Habsburg ancestry influenced Spain's involvement in the convoluted politics of the Empire: on the one hand, Philip had a vested interest in the success of his cousin Ferdinand of Bohemia, who intended to follow Matthias to the throne; on the other, Philip had hopes of electing one of his own family, such as Prince Philip, to the Imperial throne and worried that a failed bid by Ferdinand might reduce collective Habsburg prestige.

The Battle of White Mountain, 1620, a triumph for the later foreign policy of Philip III

Philip finally chose to intervene behind Ferdinand. Prince Philip had been rejected as unacceptable to the German nobility. Philip had also been increasingly influenced over the years by first Queen Margaret, and later the other, powerful Habsburg women at court, while the incoming set of advisors that replaced Lerma, especially de Zúñiga, also saw Spain's future as part of a strong alliance with a Habsburg Holy Roman Empire. Finally, by the Oñate treaty of 29 July 1617, Ferdinand made a successful appeal to Philip's self-interest by promising Spain the Habsburg lands in Alsace in return for Spanish support for his election.

Crisis broke out in Ferdinand's Kingdom of Bohemia during 1618–19, with a confrontation between Catholic and Protestant factions. Ferdinand asked Spain for help to put down the rebellion; the Protestant rebels turned to Frederick V, Elector Palatine as their new king. The situation in the Empire was in many ways auspicious for Spanish strategy; in the Spanish Netherlands Ambrosio Spinola had been conspiring to find an opportunity to intervene with the Army of Flanders into the Electoral Palatinate. The Palatinate was a vital, Protestant set of territories along the Rhine threatening the Spanish Road, the main route for reinforcements from other Spanish territories to arrive into the rebellious Dutch provinces (through Genoa). France, assumed bound to support Frederick against Ferdinand, was in fact inclined to remain neutral. The Spanish troops headed by Spinola in the Palatinate and by Johann Tserclaes, Count of Tilly in Bohemia achieved a decisive victory against the Czechs in the Battle of White Mountain in 1620. With the Dutch now vulnerable to a strike through the Rhine valley, a renewed war against the Provinces, with the aim of forcing the Dutch to a more suitable permanent peace, appeared inevitable.

Philip died in 1621 shortly before the recommencement of war—his son, Philip IV, retained his chief foreign policy advisor, de Zúñiga, and an initially highly successful campaign against the Dutch began the same year.

== Colonial policy ==
=== Chile ===
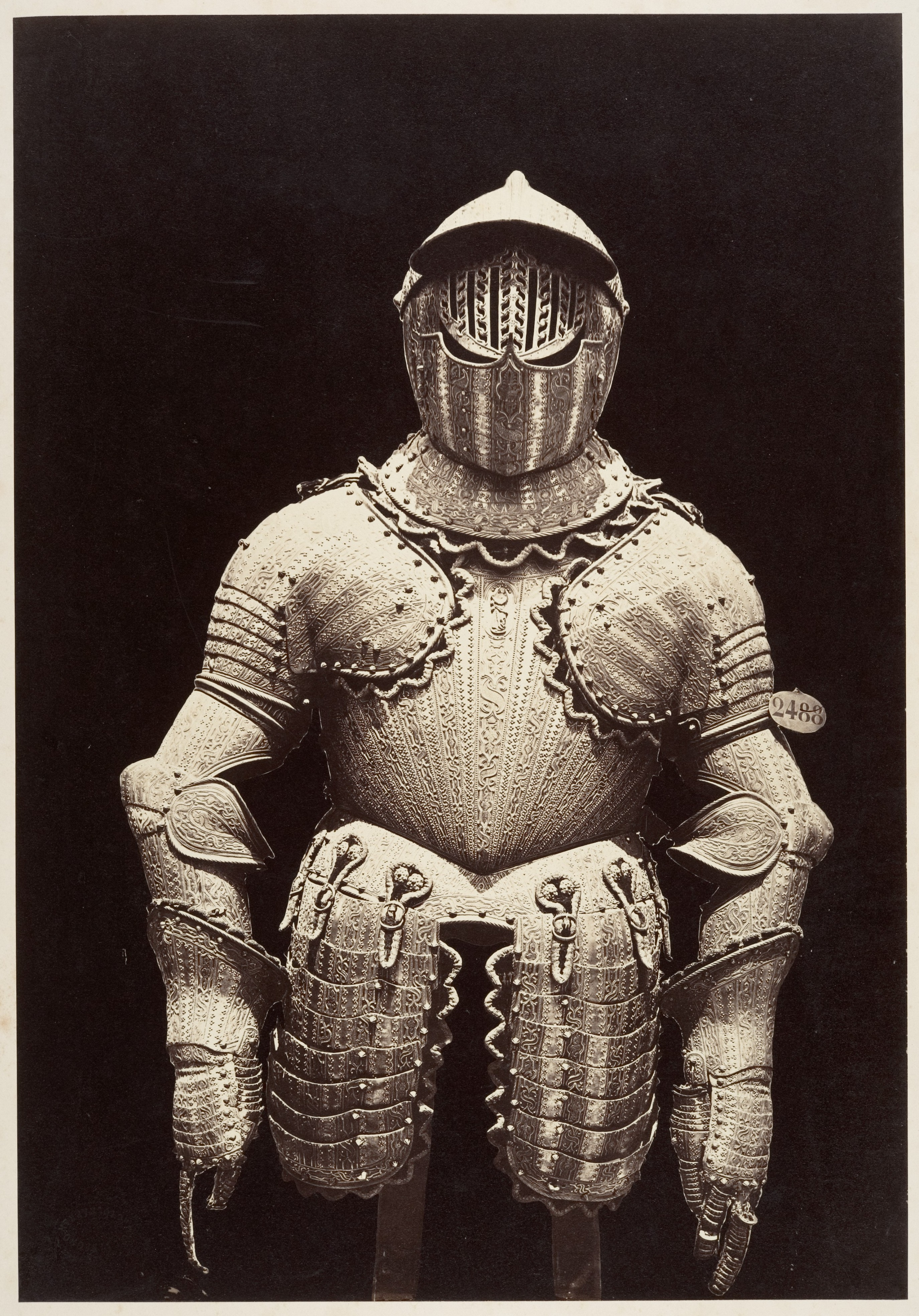
Armour of Philip III

In the Americas, Philip inherited a difficult situation in Chile, where the Arauco War raged and the local Mapuche succeeded in razing seven Spanish cities (1598–1604). An estimate by Alonso González de Nájera put the toll at 3,000 Spanish settlers killed and 500 Spanish women taken into captivity by Mapuche. In retaliation, the proscription against enslaving Indians captured in war was lifted by Philip in 1608. This decree was abused when Spanish settlers in Chiloé Archipelago used it to justify slave raids against groups such as the Chono people of northwestern Patagonia, who had never been under Spanish rule and never rebelled.

Jesuit missionary Luis de Valdivia believed the Mapuche could be voluntarily converted to Christianity only if there was peace. To diminish hostilities Valdivia proposed a Defensive War in a letter to Philip. The King supported the idea, issuing a decree that established the Defensive War as an official policy in 1612. By the time Defensive War was established, war between the Spanish and the Mapuche had been going on for 70 years.

These policies were not without criticism. Maestre de campo and corregidor of Concepción, Santiago de Tesillo claimed the Defensive War gave the Mapuche a much-needed respite to replenish their forces that should have been denied. The Real Audiencia of Santiago opined in the 1650s that the slavery of Mapuche was one of the reasons for constant state of war between the Spanish and the Mapuche.

=== Philippines ===
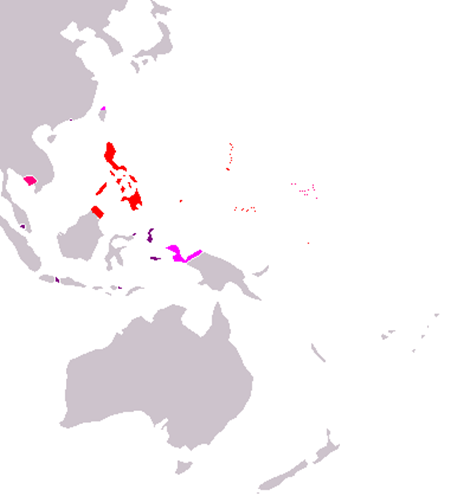
Spanish East Indies (red) and Portuguese Empire in the Indonesian Archipelago (light purple). Dark purple represents the territories to be conquered.

Philip III sought to strengthen the Spanish position in the Philippines in response to increasing threats from English and Dutch naval forces challenging the former Spanish-Portuguese monopoly over the East Indies. The Spanish response became more urgent after a Spanish-Dutch naval battle near Manila in 1600. Philip III also aimed to conquer the Sultanate of Ternate and its vassal kingdoms, fearing that Dutch expansion in the North Pacific could jeopardize Spanish trade with China and the security of New Spain.

To deter future attacks, he expanded the fleet of galleys and organized a military expedition to Ternate. As part of this effort, Pedro de Acuña prepared a series of reports on the political and military situation in the Spanish East Indies and Portuguese Indonesia, particularly focusing on relations between the Dutch East India Company and the Sultanate of Ternate. These reports were sent to the Council of the Indies in 1602.

As a result, both the Captaincy General of the Philippines and Portuguese India decided to launch a joint expedition to the Philippines, carrying Spanish and Mexican troops, funds, and supplies to put an end to Dutch-Ternatean raids. However, the Council of Portugal hesitated to cooperate with the Council of Castile, preferring to uphold the territorial boundaries established by the Treaty of Zaragoza, rather than allow the Spice islands, then controlled by Ternate and the Dutch East India Company, to fall under Spanish influence.

Despite Portuguese reluctance, Spanish forces succeeded in capturing Ternate in 1606. However, they failed to eliminate Dutch influence entirely. The Dutch continued to support Ternatean resistance and eventually succeeded in expelling the Spanish from the islands.

At the Spanish court, Acuña's plans were assessed and approved for implementation. However, there was a key issue: the Moluccas were Portuguese territory while the ministers who studied Acuña's proposals were Castilian. Philip III did not want a confrontation between kingdoms over this issue and asked for a joint assessment of the Moluccas problem, but the ideas of both sides seemed irreconcilable. The Castilian advisors understood that if there was intervention from the Philippine Islands, as Acuña proposed, the Moluccas should come under Castilian control, since politically and militarily it made more sense. The Portuguese did not view this manoeuvre favourably and hoped that Ternate would return to Portuguese control, even if the Castilians had recovered it. In the end, there was no understanding, and the king opted for the Castilian position, and at the end of 1602, he approved Acuña's proposal (...) The governor's plan was first to regain control of Ternate, the most important kingdom with a great influence over the other local powers, and then to gain the loyalty of the other kingdoms. With their firm support, Acuña hoped to be able to cut off the clove trade to the Dutch, so that they would have no interest in returning to the islands. Finally, once the Spanish had settled in the Moluccas, he hoped to be able to make the leap to the islands of Ambon and Banda, where the Dutch maintained trade and had prominent forces. In a few years, the Spice Islands could be sealed off from the Batavian passage and thus deal a great blow to their economy and overseas prestige (...) After the initial success of the conquest of Ternate, a relief effort was organised from the Philippines, intended to make up for the losses of the day and the resources expended. This was not very extensive, but according to the original plan, this was not important, since the Spanish troops were going to rely on local troops in their fight against the Dutch. However, events did not go according to plan, and there was no clear alternative response to this relief (...) Essentially, the relief system devised by the Spanish for the Moluccas allowed them to supply the garrison with the money, men, and resources that the garrison might need to recover its losses and watch over the Moluccas, but it could not compete with the large forces that a VOC squadron could deploy on the ground.

— Íñigo María Valpuesta Villa (historian)

In 1604, Philip III restricted Chinese trade exclusively to New Spain (Mexico), limiting it strictly to the Manila galleon route, due to concerns that transpacific commerce was undermining the transatlantic trade system. This policy ended the flow of Asian goods and silver between Ming China, the Philippines, and the broader western fringe of Spanish America including Mexico, Central America, Peru, and Chile which had previously been authorized by Philip II in 1579.

The decision caused resentment in the Viceroyalty of Peru, as it formally excluded the region from engaging in direct or indirect trade with the Far East, including stopovers at Acapulco. In response, smuggling among South American merchants increased as they sought to evade the restrictions.

Juan de Mendoza y Luna, Marquis of Montesclaros, who served as Viceroy of both New Spain and of Peru at different times, supported these efforts under the informal policy of "Obedezco pero no cumplo" (literally, "I obey but I do not comply"). He believed it unwise to damage the commercial interests of merchants in Lima and Mexico City, who had already developed a triangular trade network with Manila. This network even facilitated migration from East and Southeast Asia including Chinese, Japanese, Filipinos, Indonesians, Indian, and Luso-Asian populations to Spanish America.

Nonetheless, Montesclaros did not intend to disobey the king or promote corruption. Instead, he proposed legalizing the Manila–Acapulco–Callao trade route so that the Spanish crown could regulate and tax it officially.

=== Hispaniola ===
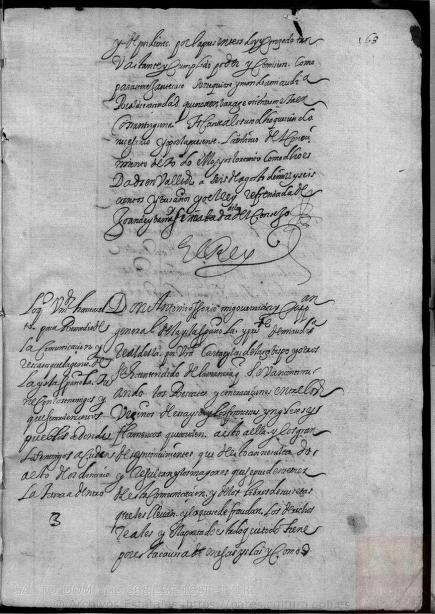
First page of the royal decree issued by Philip, ordering Antonio de Osorio to carry out the devastations. The seven-page decree is registered in the General Archive of the Indies in Seville, Andalusia, Spain.

Phillip III's decision to depopulate the western part of the island of Hispaniola, or Santo Domingo, to eliminate the smuggling that took place in those areas, was considered controversial albeit little-known.

This action, known in Dominican history as the Devastations of Osorio, proved catastrophic for Hispaniola. The island went from being a valuable resource for Spain in the Caribbean to the most impoverished territory of the Spanish empire.

Furthermore, the depopulated territories in the west of the island were eventually occupied by the French (who were enemies of Spain at that time).

== Spanish Golden Age ==
Between the end of Philip II's reign and during that of Philip III's, the Spanish Golden Age happened mostly in two cities: Seville and Madrid. Seville was the home of Diego Velázquez, who started painting during Philip II's reign, and Madrid was the site of the Plaza Mayor, where a statue of Philip III was built.

In 1599, Mateo Alemán published the picaresque novel Guzmán de Alfarache to critical acclaim. In 1605, Miguel de Cervantes published the first part of Don Quixote, which he developed while he was incarcerated, and in 1615 he published the second part. Cervantes also shared a neighborhood with poet Lope de Vega, who wrote around 1,000 plays, more than 400 of which survive today. Other writers who were active during this period include Luis de Góngora, Francisco de Quevedo, Francisco de Rioja, Bartolomé Leonardo de Argensola, Lupercio Leonardo de Argensola, Bernardino de Rebolledo, Rodrigo Caro, and Andrés Rey de Artieda.

== Death ==
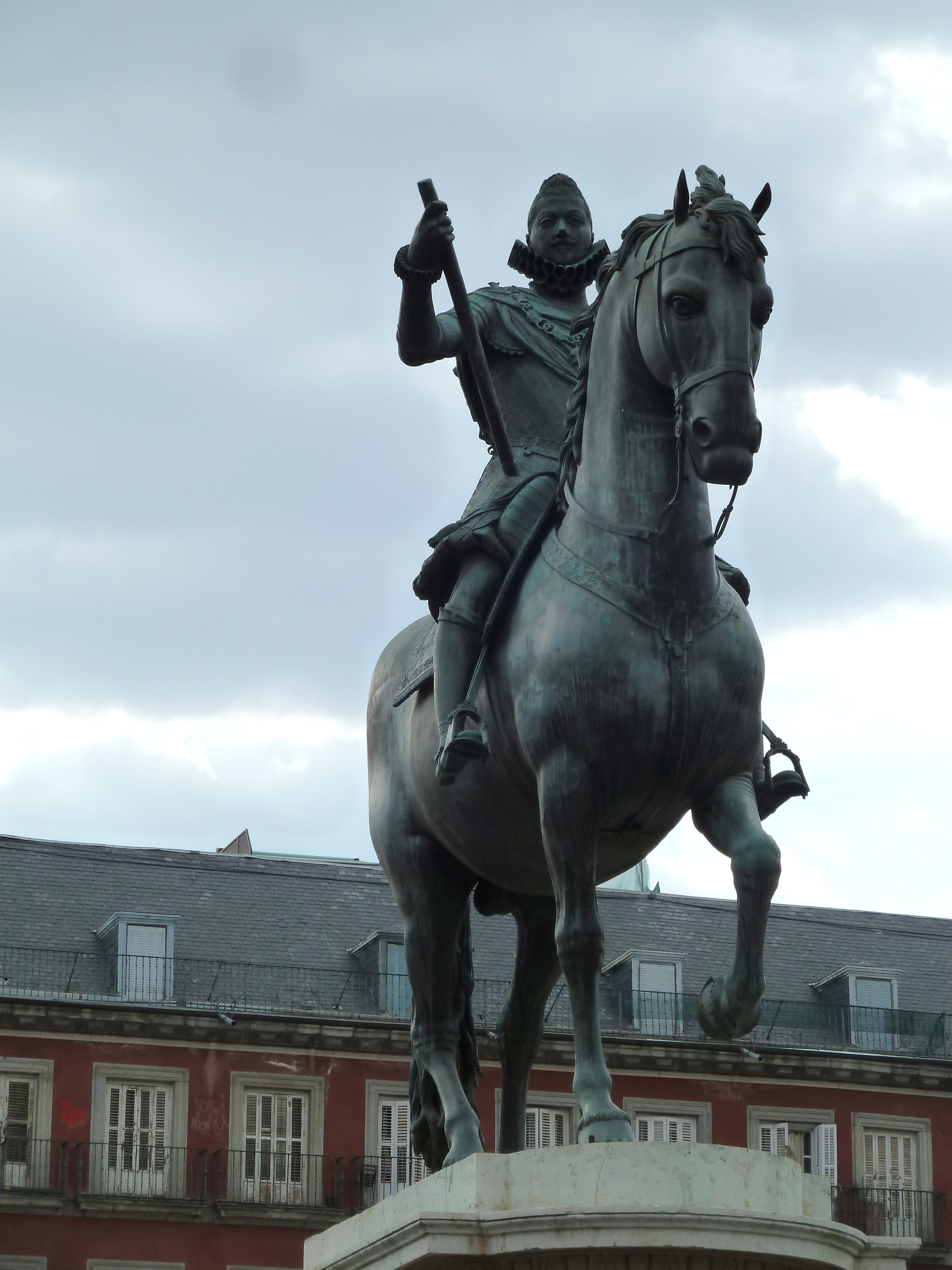
Statue of Philip III in Madrid, by Giambologna, finished by Pietro Tacca (1616)

To improve relations, Philip undertook a trip to Portugal in 1619, which was applauded by the new minister and valido, the Duke of Uzeda, son of the Duke of Lerma. He was received with enthusiasm, with councils and corporations spending enormous sums during his reception. He was suggested to make Lisbon the capital of the Spanish monarchy. Noblemen and jurisconsults complained that they neither received favors nor were employed in courts, embassies, or Spanish universities. The Duke of Uceda treated Teodósio II, Duke of Braganza, a potential leader of opposition to Spanish rule, who had come to pay homage, harshly.

After months in Lisbon, Philip left in October, leaving the country dissatisfied, especially after the reappointment of the Marquess of Alenquer as Viceroy. His son, the future Philip III of Portugal, was sworn as the legitimate heir by the Portuguese. In the rest of Portugal's domains, the Dutch had tried to take the Moluccas, Malacca and Mozambique, being defeated by André Furtado de Mendonça and Estêvão de Ataíde.

The reform of the kingdom's Ordinances was published in Portugal in 1603, which the King addressed at the beginning of his reign. These are the well-known ordinations called the Philippine Ordinances, which were preceded by the Alfonsine and Manueline Ordinances.

This King became known in Portugal by the nickname The Pious. Upon leaving Portugal in 1619, he fell seriously ill in Covarrubias and never recovered, dying within a year. For 53 days, he was bedridden, covered in sores and abscesses. He died at the age of 42 due to pulmonary thromboembolism caused by prolonged immobilization.

It is said that his last words were: "Oh! If at that time I had been in a desert to become a saint! Now I would appear with more confidence at the judgment seat of Jesus Christ!"

== Legacy ==
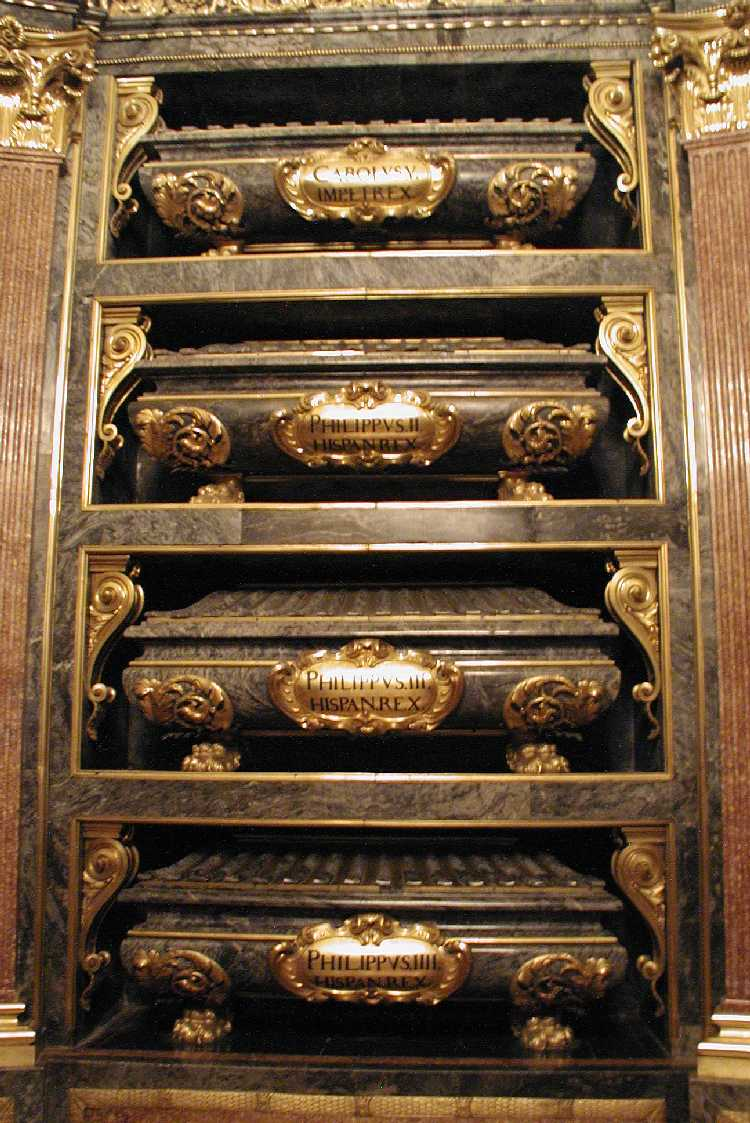
Philip III's tomb, between those of his grandfather, father and son

Philip III died in Madrid on 31 March 1621, and was succeeded by his son, Philip IV, who swiftly removed the last remnants of the Sandoval family regime from court. According to the memoirs of the French ambassador François de Bassompierre, the claim that he was killed by the heat of a brasero (a pan of hot charcoal), due to the absence of the proper official is a humorous exaggeration of the court etiquette.

Philip has generally left a poor legacy with historians. Three major historians of the period have described an 'undistinguished and insignificant man', a 'miserable monarch', whose 'only virtue appeared to reside in a total absence of vice'. More generally, Philip has largely retained the reputation of 'a weak, dim-witted monarch who preferred hunting and traveling to governing'.

Unlike Philip IV, whose reputation has improved significantly in the light of recent analysis, Philip III's reign has been relatively unstudied, possibly because of the negative interpretation given to the role of Philip and Lerma during the period. Traditionally, the decline of Spain has been placed from the 1590s onward; revisionist historians from the 1960s, however, presented an alternative analysis, arguing that in many ways Philip III's Spain of 1621—reinforced with new territories in Alsace, at peace with France, dominant in the Holy Roman Empire, and about to begin a successful campaign against the Dutch—was in a much stronger position than in 1598, despite the poor personal performance of her king during the period. Philip's use of Lerma as his valido has formed one of the key historical and contemporary criticisms against him; recent work (Note: In particular, Feros (2006) and Williams's (2006) recent extensive studies of the period, and Sánchez's (1996) analysis of the role of powerful women, often under-reported in historical documents, at Philip's court.) has perhaps begun to present a more nuanced picture of the relationship and the institution that survived for the next forty years in Spanish royal government.

== Family tree ==
Like many Habsburgs, Philip III was the product of extensive inbreeding. His father, Philip II, a product of marriage between first cousins, married his niece, Anna of Austria, herself the product of a cousin couple. Philip III, in turn, married his first cousin once removed, Margaret of Austria. This pattern would continue in the next generation, ultimately culminating in the end of the Spanish Habsburg line in the person of Philip's feeble grandson, Charles II.

Ancestors of Philip III and his relationship with his wife

Ferdinand II; King of Aragon; 1452–1516	Isabella I Queen of Castile; 1451–1504
Manuel I King of Portugal; 1469–1521	Maria of Aragon; 1482–1517	Joanna; Queen of Castile (Note: Charles V, Holy Roman Emperor at the Encyclopædia Britannica); 1479–1555	Philip I King of Castile; 1478–1506
Isabella of Portugal; 1503–39	Charles V Holy Roman Emperor; 1500–58	Ferdinand I Holy Roman Emperor (Note: Press, Volker (1990). "Maximilian II.". Neue Deutsche Biographie (in German). Vol. 16. Berlin: Duncker & Humblot. pp. 471–475. (full text online).); 1503–64	Anna of Bohemia and Hungary; 1503–47
Maria of Spain; 1528–1603	Maximilian II; Holy Roman Emperor; 1527–76	Anna of Austria; 1528–90
Philip II; King of Spain; 1527–98	Anna of Austria; 1549–80	Charles II; Archduke of Austria (Note: Eder, Karl (1961). "Ferdinand II.". Neue Deutsche Biographie (in German). Vol. 5. Berlin: Duncker & Humblot. pp. 83–85. (full text online).); 1540–90	Maria Anna of Bavaria; 1551–1608
Philip III; King of Spain; 1578–1621	Margaret of Austria; 1584–1611

== Family ==
Philip married Margaret of Austria, his first cousin once removed. They had 8 children, five of whom survived to adulthood.

Name	Birth	Death	Notes
By Margaret of Austria (25 December 1584 – 3 October 1611; married in 1599)
Anne	22 September 1601	20 January 1666	Queen of France. Married Louis XIII
Maria	1 February 1603	1 March 1603	Died young
Philip IV	8 April 1605	17 September 1665	King of Spain. Married 1) Elisabeth of France (1602–1644) and 2) Mariana of Austria
Maria Anna	18 August 1606	13 May 1646	Holy Roman Empress. Married Ferdinand III, Holy Roman Emperor
Charles	15 September 1607	30 July 1632	Died unmarried
Ferdinand	16 May 1609	9 November 1641	A military general and Cardinal
Margaret	24 May 1610	11 March 1617	Died young
Alfonso	22 September 1611	16 September 1612	Died young

== Male-line family tree ==
House of Habsburg

Original line
Albert; Count of Habsburg c. 1188–1239
Rudolf I of Germany c. 1218–1291
Albert I of Germany; 1255–1308	Hartmann; 1263–1281	Rudolf II; Duke of Austria; 1270–1290
Rudolf I of Bohemia; 1281–1307	Frederick the Fair c. 1289–1330	Leopold I Duke of Austria; 1290–1326	Albert II; Duke of Austria; 1298–1358	Henry the Friendly; 1299–1327	Otto; Duke of Austria; 1301–1339	John; Parricida c. 1290–1312/1313
Albertinian line	Leopoldian line
Rudolf IV; Duke of Austria; 1339–1365	Frederick III; 1347–1362	Albert III; Duke of Austria; 1349–1395	Leopold III; Duke of Austria; 1351–1386	Frederick II; Duke of Austria; 1327–1344	Leopold II; Duke of Austria; 1328–1344
Albert IV; Duke of Austria; 1377–1404	William; Duke of Austria c. 1370–1406	Leopold IV; Duke of Austria; 1371–1411	Ernest; Duke of Austria; 1377–1424	Frederick IV; Duke of Austria; 1382–1439
Albert II of Germany; 1397–1439	Frederick III; HRE; 1415–1493	Albert VI; Archduke of Austria; 1418–1463	Sigismund; Archduke of Austria; 1427–1496
Ladislaus the Posthumous; 1440–1457	Maximilian I HRE; 1459–1519
Philip I of Castile; 1478–1506
Spanish / Iberian line	Austrian / HRE line
Charles V HRE; 1500–1558	Ferdinand I HRE; 1503–1564
Philip II of Spain; 1527–1598	Maximilian II; HRE; 1527–1576	Ferdinand II; Archduke of Austria; 1529–1595	Charles II; Archduke of Austria; 1540–1590
Carlos; Prince of Asturias; 1545–1568	Philip III of Spain; 1578–1621	Rudolf II; HRE; 1552–1612	Ernest of Austria; 1553–1595	Matthias; HRE; 1557–1619	Maximilian III; Archduke of Austria; 1558–1618	Albert VII; Archduke of Austria; 1559–1621	Wenceslaus; Archduke of Austria; 1561–1578	Andrew; Margrave of Burgau; 1558–1600	Charles; Margrave of Burgau; 1560–1618	Ferdinand II; HRE; 1578–1637	Maximilian Ernest of Austria; 1583–1616	Leopold V Archduke of Austria; 1586–1632	Charles of Austria; 1590–1624
Philip IV of Spain; 1605–1665	Charles of Austria; 1607–1632	Ferdinand of Austria; 1609–1641	John-Charles of Austria; 1605–1619	Ferdinand III; HRE; 1608–1657	Leopold Wilhelm of Austria; 1614–1662	Ferdinand Charles; Archduke of Austria; 1628–1662	Sigismund Francis; Archduke of Austria; 1630–1665
Balthasar Charles; Prince of Asturias; 1629–1646	Charles II of Spain; 1661–1700	Ferdinand IV; King of the Romans; 1633–1654	Leopold I HRE; 1640–1705	Charles Joseph of Austria; 1649–1664
Joseph I HRE; 1678–1711	Charles VI; HRE; 1685–1740
Lorraine
Maria Theresa; HRE; 1740–1780	Francis I HRE; 1745–1765
Habsburg-Lorraine
Joseph II; HRE; 1765–1790	Leopold II; HRE; 1790–1792
Francis II; HRE; 1792–1806

== See also ==
- Palacio de la Ribera

== Bibliography ==
- Canales, Carlos; Rey, Miguel (2016). De Salamina a las Malvinas: 25 siglos de guerra naval (in Spanish). Spain: EDAF. ISBN 978-84-4143-700-5.
- Carter, Charles H. (1963). "The Nature of Spanish Government After Philip II". The Historian. 26 (1): 1–18. doi:10.1111/j.1540-6563.1963.tb00234.x. JSTOR 24442462.
- Cipolla, Carlo M., ed. (1974). The Fontana Economic History of Europe: The Sixteenth and Seventeenth Centuries. London: Fontana.
- Cruz, Anne J. (1999). Discourses of Poverty: Social Reform and the Picaresque Novel. Toronto: University of Toronto Press.
- Davenport, Frances G. (2004). European Treaties Bearing on the History of the United States and Its Dependencies. The Lawbook Exchange, Ltd.
- Elliott, J. H. (1963). Imperial Spain: 1469–1716. London: Penguin.
- Feros, Antonio. (2006). Kingship and Favouritism in the Spain of Philip III, 1598–1621. Cambridge: Cambridge University Press.
- Goodman, David (2002). Spanish Naval Power, 1589–1665: Reconstruction and Defeat. Cambridge: Cambridge University Press.
- Kamen, Henry (2005). Spain, 1469–1714: A Society of Conflict. Harlow: Pearson Education.
- Harvey, Leonard Patrick (2005). Muslims in Spain, 1500–1614. Chicago: University of Chicago Press.
- Hoffman, Philip T.; Norberg, Kathyrn, eds. (2001). Fiscal Crises, Liberty, and Representative Government 1450–1789. Stanford University Press.
- Lynch, John (1969). Spain Under the Habsburgs. Spain and America. Vol. 2. New York: Oxford University Press. pp. 14–61. ISBN 978-0-631-08030-5.
- De Maddalena, Aldo (1974). Cipolla (ed.). Rural Europe, 1500–1750.
- Mattingly, Garrett (2005). The Armada. New York: Mariner Books.
- Munck, Thomas (1990). Seventeenth Century Europe, 1598–1700. London: Macmillan.
- Parker, Geoffrey (1984). Europe in Crisis, 1598–1648. London: Fontana.
- Parker, Geoffrey (1985). The Dutch Revolt. London: Pelican Books.
- Parker, Geoffrey (2004). The Army of Flanders and the Spanish Road, 1567–1659. Cambridge: Cambridge University Press.
- Perry, Mary Elizabeth (2005). The Handless Maiden: Moriscos and the politics of religion in early modern Spain. Princeton: Princeton University Press.
- Polisensky, J. V. (1971). The Thirty Years War. London: NEL.
- Ringrose, David (1998). Spain, Europe and the "Spanish Miracle", 1700–1900. Cambridge: Cambridge University Press.
- Rodríguez González, Agustín Ramón (2021). Lepanto, la batalla decisiva (in Spanish). Spain: Sekotia Ediciones. ISBN 978-84-1675-090-0.
- Sánchez, Magdalena S. (1996). "Pious and Political Images of a Habsburg Woman at the Court of Philip III (1598–1621)". In Sánchez; Saint-Saëns, Alain (eds.). Spanish women in the golden age: images and realities. Greenwood Publishing Group.
- Stradling, R. A. (1988). Philip IV and the Government of Spain, 1621–1665. Cambridge: Cambridge University Press.
- Thompson, I. A. A. (2001). Hoffman; Norburg (eds.). Castile, Constitionalism and Liberty.
- Tuck, Richard (1993). Philosophy and government, 1572–1651. New York City: Cambridge University Press. ISBN 978-0-521-43885-8.
- Wedgwood, C.V. (1981). The Thirty Years War. London: Methuen.
- Williams, Patrick (2006). The Great Favourite: the Duke of Lerma and the court and government of Philip III of Spain, 1598–1621. Manchester: Manchester University Press.
- Zagorin, Perez (1992). Rebels and Rulers, 1500–1660. Vol. II Provincial rebellion: Revolutionary civil wars, 1560–1660. Cambridge: Cambridge University Press.

Philip III of Spain House of Habsburg Born: 14 April 1578 Died: 31 March 1621
Regnal titles
Preceded by Philip II of Spain	King of Spain, Portugal, Sardinia, Naples, and Sicily; Duke of Milan; 1598–1621	Succeeded by Philip IV of Spain
Spanish royalty
Preceded by Diego	Prince of Asturias; 1582–98	Succeeded by Philip
Preceded by Diego	Prince of Portugal; 1582–98	Succeeded by Anne
