= Infanta Margarita of Spain (1610–1617) =

Spanish infanta who died in childhood

Margarita of Spain
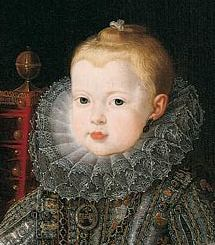
- Detail of the portrait of the infanta and her brother Alonso by Bartolomé González in the Instituto de Valencia de Don Juan, Madrid
- Born: 25 May 1610; Lerma, Crown of Castile
- Died: 11 March 1617 (aged 6); Madrid, Crown of Castile
- Burial: Panteon de Infantes, El Escorial
- Father: Philip III of Spain
- Mother: Margaret of Austria

Margarita of Spain (25 May 1610 - 11 March 1617) was an infanta of Spain, who died in childhood.

== Life ==
Margarita was the seventh child of the marriage between Philip III and Margaret of Austria and the fourth of their daughters, after Ana, María and María Ana.

She was born in Lerma, capital of the states of the valido of her father, the Duke of Lerma, while was still in his privileged position. On 10 June 1610, the feast of Corpus Christi, she was baptized in Valladolid Cathedral by the archbishop of Toledo, Bernardo de Sandoval. Her godparents were her older sister, the Infanta Ana Mauricia and the Duke of Lerma himself. In honor of this last godfather, she received Francisca as a middle name. She was carried to the baptismal font by her baptismal godfather. (Note: In Spanish royal baptisms, this honour of bringing the newborn to the baptismal font was second in importance only to the one of being godparent.)

At the age of six she could already write and read the catechism. She was fond of pious practices.

She died in the Royal Alcázar of Madrid at the age of 6 years. She was taken with the usual pomp to the monastery of San Lorenzo de El Escorial. She is buried in the ninth chamber of the Panteón of Infantes, under the following epitaph:

Non moriar sed vivam et narrabo opera Domini (Sal 117, 17)
