= Girolamo Frachetta =

Italian philosopher and political writer

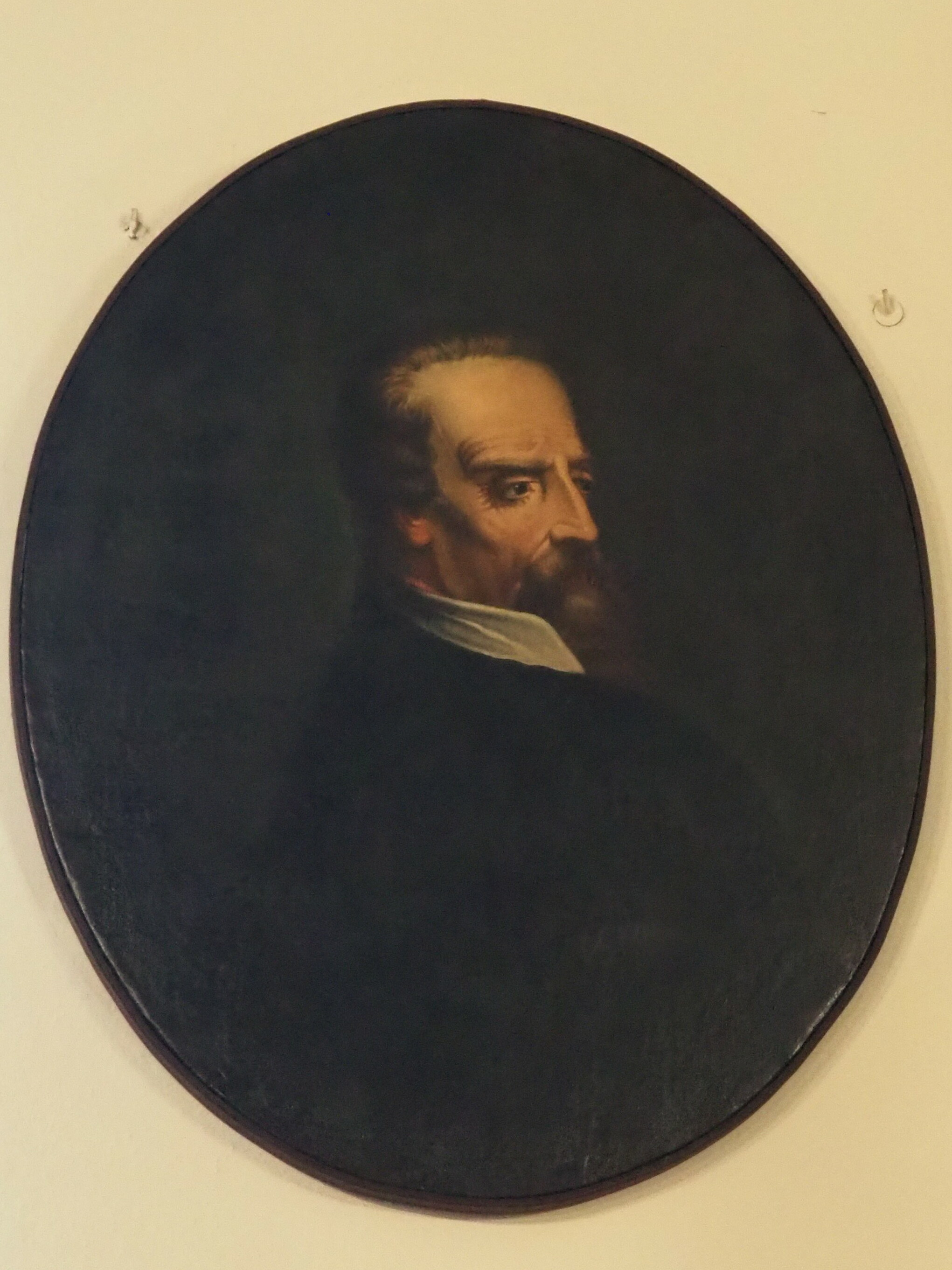
- Girolamo Frachetta
- Born: 1558; Rovigo, Republic of Venice
- Died: 30 December 1619 (aged 60–61); Naples, Kingdom of Naples
- Occupations: Philosopher; Political writer; Diplomat; Renaissance humanist
- Parent(s): Stefano Frachetta and Marta Frachetta (née Castelli)

Academic background
- Education: University of Padua
- Doctoral advisor: Francesco Piccolomini

Academic work
- Era: Italian Renaissance
- Discipline: Political philosophy

Girolamo Frachetta (1558 – 30 December 1619) was an Italian Renaissance philosopher and political writer.

== Biography ==
Girolamo Frachetta was born in Rovigo in 1558, where he studied the humanities with Antonio Riccoboni. He then studied philosophy with Francesco Piccolomini at the University of Padua. After graduating in law, he placed himself at the service of Luigi D'Este, Scipione Gonzaga, and Antonio Fernández de Córdoba y Cardona, Duke of Sessa, the Spanish Ambassador in Rome. For unknown reasons he was forced to leave Rome and he retired to Naples, where he was protected in by the Viceroy, Juan Alonso Pimentel de Herrera, Duke of Benavente, who assigned him a liberal pension. He died in Naples in 1619.

== Works ==
In 1589 Frachetta published the Breve spositione di tutta l’opera di Lucretio, the first paraphrase of Lucretius’ De rerum natura written in a vernacular language. In Il prencipe (1597) and Della ragione di stato (1623) he dealt with political and economic questions. He proposed taxation of the nobility, believing it contributed to social order and tranquility, and, following many of his contemporaries, thought that political problems should be dealt with pragmatically, not dogmatically. His main work, Il Seminario de' Governi di Stato et di Guerra, contains about 8.000 military and state maxims, and was highly successful. The best edition is that of Genoa, 1648.

== Bibliography ==
- Baldini, Enzo (1997). "FRACHETTA, Girolamo". Dizionario Biografico degli Italiani (in Italian). Vol. 49: Forino–Francesco da Serino. Rome: Istituto dell'Enciclopedia Italiana. ISBN 978-88-12-00032-6.
- Chiarelli, F. (2002). "Frachetta, Girolamo". The Oxford Companion to Italian Literature. Oxford University Press.
- Coleman, James K. (2014). "Translating Impiety: Girolamo Frachetta and the First Vernacular Commentary on Lucretius". Quaderni d'Italianistica. 35 (1): 55–72. doi:10.33137/q.i..v35i1.22352.
