= Infanta Maria of Spain (1603) =

Spanish princess (1603–1603)

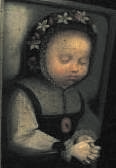
- Detail of the mourning portrait of the infanta in the Convent of Las Descalzas Reales, Madrid
- Born: 1 February 1603; Valladolid, Crown of Castile
- Died: 1 March 1603 (aged 1 month); Valladolid, Crown of Castile
- Burial: Panteon de Infantes, El Escorial
- Father: Philip III of Spain
- Mother: Margaret of Austria

Maria of Spain (1 February 1603 – 1 March 1603) was a Spanish princess who died in infancy.

== Life ==
She was the second child (and second daughter) of Philip III of Spain and Margaret of Austria. She was born in Valladolid, where the Spanish Court was based from 1601 to 1606. She was baptized Maria Aná Philippa at Iglesia de San Pablo on February 3. She died at her first month.

She is buried in the Panteon de Infantes of El Escorial, specifically in the sixth sepulchral chamber, in what is commonly known as the infant mausoleum, under the inscription:

MARIA, PHILIPPI III FILIA
