= Francesco Piccolomini (philosopher) =

Italian philosopher and professor (1523–1607)

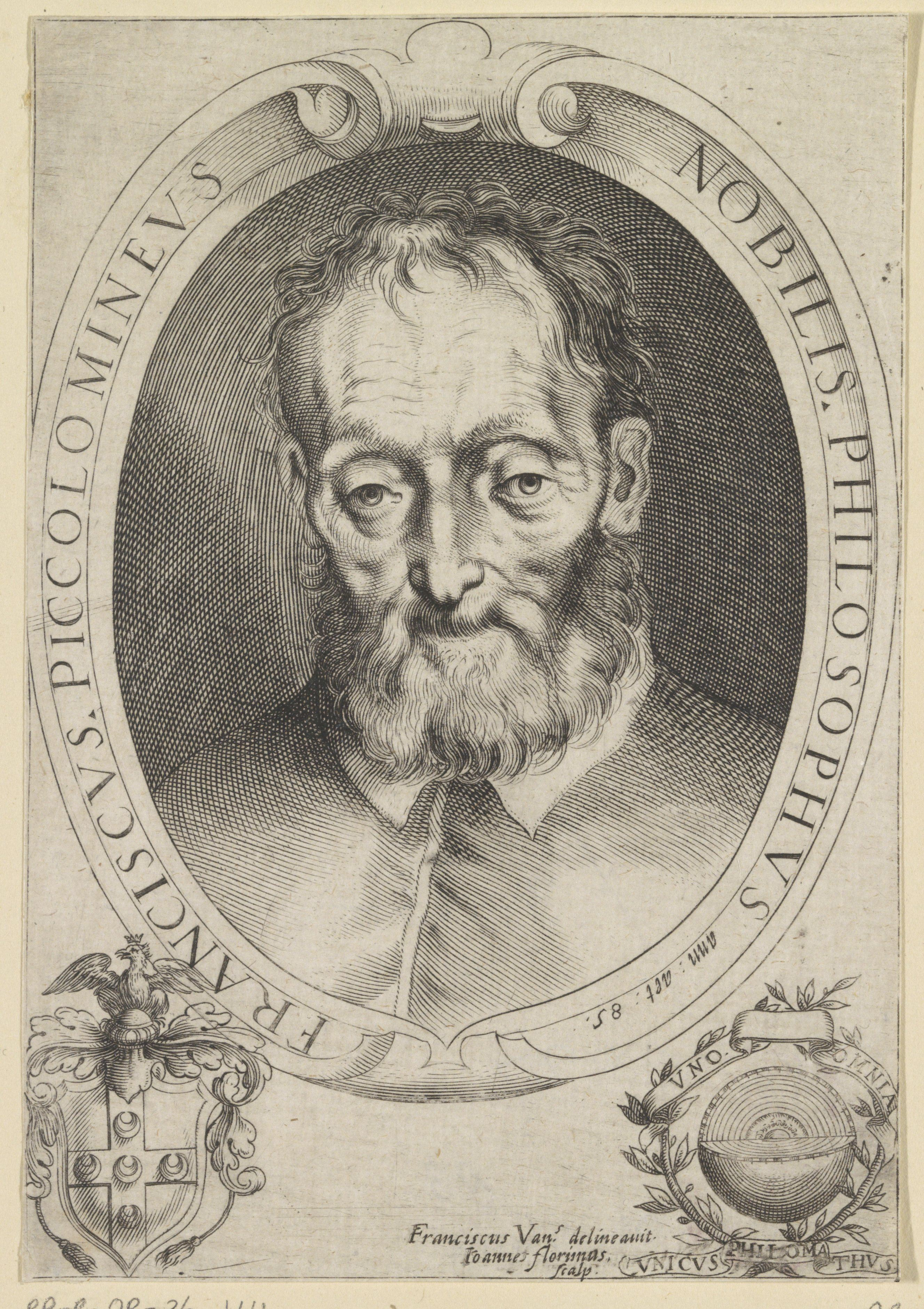
Francesco Piccolomini

Francesco Piccolomini (1523–1607) was senior chair of natural philosophy at the University of Padua from 1560–1598, moving there from previous professorial positions at the University of Siena, Macerata, and Perugia. His best-known work, Universa philosophia de moribus (A Comprehensive Philosophy of Morals), systematizes and extends Aristotle's work on ethics and politics.

In his time, Piccolomini was one of the most revered professors of philosophy in Italy and the most highly paid at Padua. Torquato Tasso called him "a veritable sea and ocean of all learning". He sparred intellectually with his fellow Aristotelian professor Jacopo Zabarella; the latter's De doctrinae ordine apologia (1584) was written in response to the criticisms of Piccolomini.

== Works ==
- Universa philosophia de moribus (1583)
- Comes politicus pro recta ordinis ratione propugnator (1596)
- Librorum ad scientiam de natura attinentium (Venència, 1596)
- De rerum definitionibus (1600)
- Discursus ad universam logicam attinens (1606)

== Bibliography ==
- MacIntyre, Alasdair C. (2006). Ethics and Politics: Selected Essays. Vol. 2. pp. 7–18. ISBN 0-521-67062-4.
- Enciclopedia Universal Ilustrada Europeo-Americana (in Spanish). José Espasa and Sons. 1994. p. 329. ISBN 84-239-4544-8.
- Kraye, Jill (August 28, 1997). Cambridge Translations of Renaissance Philosophical Texts. Cambridge University Press. pp. 68–69. ISBN 978-0-521-42604-6.
- Ragnisco, P. "Giacomo Zabarella il filosofo: la polemica tra Fr. Piccolomini e G. Zabarella". Atti dell' Istituto Veneto (in Italian). 6 (4): 1885–86.
- Schmitt, C.B.; et al. (eds.). The Cambridge History of Renaissance Philosophy. pp. 527–30.
- Carotti, Laura (2015). "PICCOLOMINI, Francesco". Dizionario Biografico degli Italiani (in Italian). Vol. 83: Piacentini–Pio V. Rome: Istituto dell'Enciclopedia Italiana. ISBN 978-88-12-00032-6.
