= Margaret of Austria, Queen of Spain =

Queen of Spain and Portugal from 1599 to 1611

Margaret of Austria
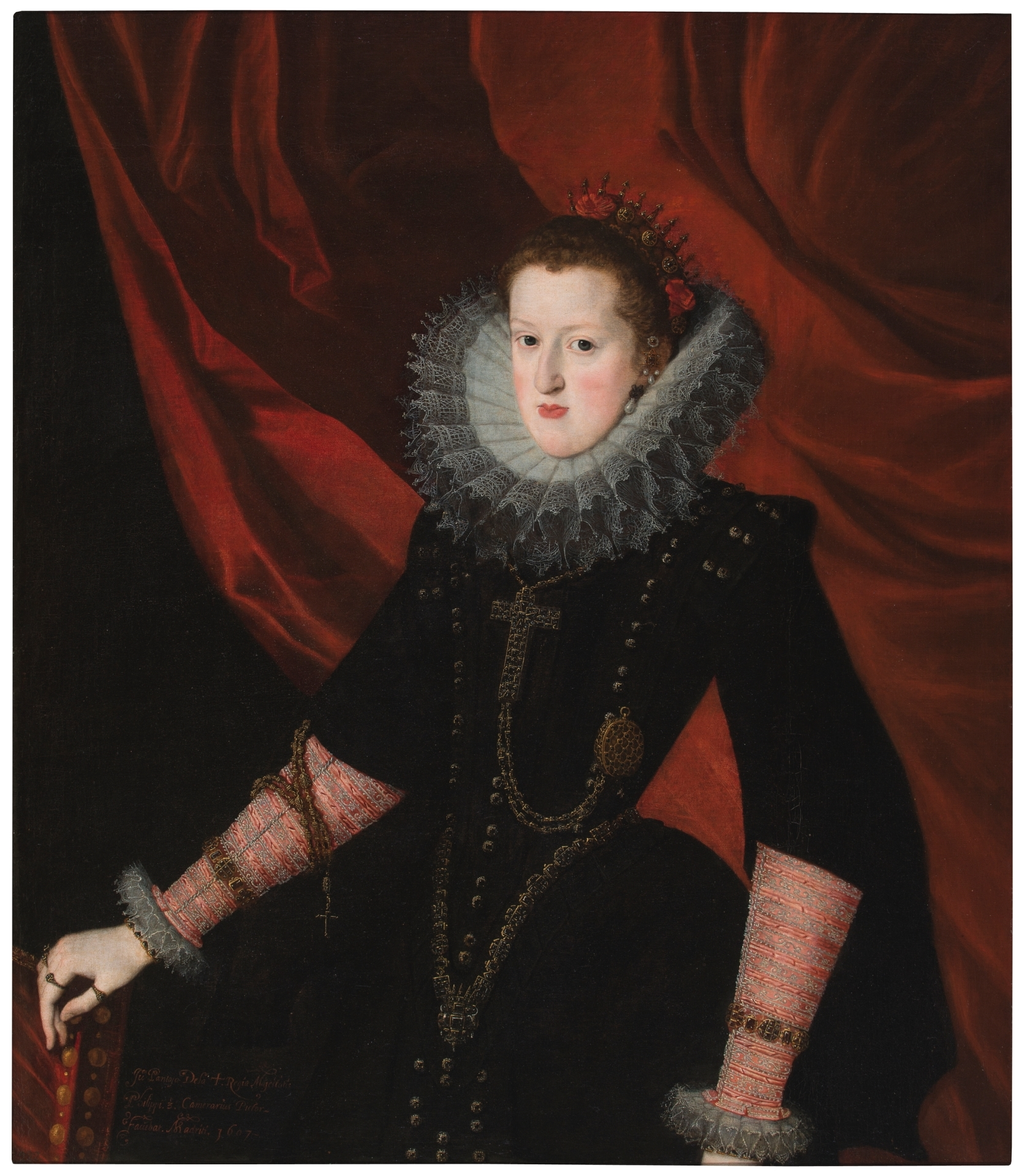
- Portrait by Juan Pantoja de la Cruz, c. 1607

Queen consort of Spain and Portugal
- Tenure: 18 April 1599 – 3 October 1611
- Born: 25 December 1584; Graz, Duchy of Styria, Holy Roman Empire
- Died: 3 October 1611 (aged 26); San Lorenzo de El Escorial, Crown of Castile
- Burial: El Escorial
- Spouse: Philip III of Spain (m. 1599)
- Issue: Anne, Queen of France; Infanta Maria; Philip IV, King of Spain; Maria Anna, Holy Roman Empress; Infante Carlos; Cardinal-Infante Ferdinand; Infanta Margarita; Infante Alonso
- House: Habsburg
- Father: Charles II of Austria
- Mother: Maria Anna of Bavaria

Margaret of Austria (Margarete in German; 25 December 1584 – 3 October 1611) was Queen of Spain and Portugal by her marriage to King Philip III & II.

== Biography ==
Margaret was the daughter of Archduke Charles II of Austria and Maria Anna of Bavaria and thus the paternal granddaughter of the Holy Roman Emperor Ferdinand I. Her elder brother was the Archduke Ferdinand, who was elected emperor in 1619. Two of her sisters, Anna and Constance, through their subsequent marriages to King Sigismund III Vasa, became Queens of Poland.

=== Queen of Spain ===
Coat of arms of Margaret of Austria, Queen of Spain

Margaret married Philip III of Spain, her first cousin, once removed, on 18 April 1599.

She became an influential figure at her husband's court. Philip had an "affectionate, close relationship" with Margaret, and paid her additional attention after they had a son in 1605.

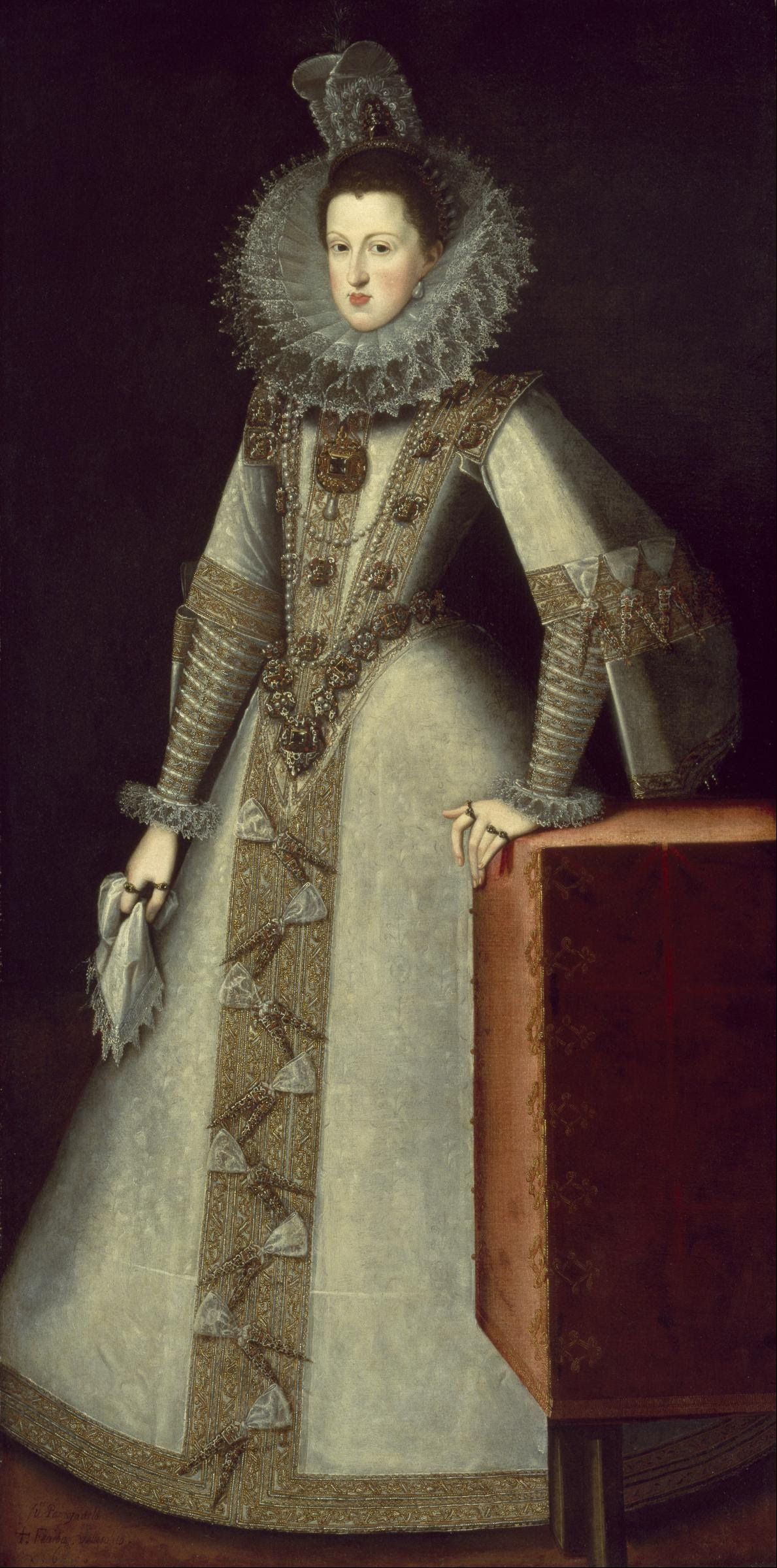
Juan Pantoja de la Cruz –Margaret of Austria, Queen of Spain, c. 1605

Margaret was also a great patron of the arts. She was considered by contemporaries to be a pious Catholic and "astute and very skillful" in her political dealings.

Alongside the Empress Maria, widow of Holy Roman Emperor Maximilian II, and the latter's daughter Archduchess Margaret, who lived as a nun in Madrid, Queen Margaret formed a circle of women wielding considerable influence over the king. They emphasised Spain's status as a Catholic power acting in the interest of Catholic Europe and also highlighted the unity of the House of Habsburg. They were successful, for example, in convincing Philip to provide financial support to Ferdinand II, Holy Roman Emperor.

The pro-Austrian camp at the Spanish court was opposed by the Duke of Lerma, the King's chief minister, who argued that Spain should pursue her own course of action independently of religious or dynastic ties. Queen Margaret was "melancholic" and unhappy about the influence of the Duke, whom she considered corrupt, over her husband, and continually fought him for influence over the King. In this conflict, she was supported by her favourite Mariana de San José, prioress of the Monasteria la Encarnación, her husband's confessor Father Luis de Aliaga, and her daughter Maria Anna's confessor, the Franciscan friar Juan de Santa María—who was felt by contemporaries to have an excessive influence over the King at the end of his life. The Duke of Lerma was eventually removed from power in 1618, though only after Margaret's death.

Margaret died while giving birth to her youngest child, Alfonso. Her husband never remarried and died ten years later.

In October 1611, the English diplomat John Digby reported a rumour that the strong scent of amber gloves worn by Philip III had accidentally led to the death of Margaret of Austria.

== Issue ==
Margaret and Philip had eight children:

- Anna Maria Mauricia (22 September 1601 – 20 January 1666), queen of France
- Maria (1 February 1603 – 1 March 1603)
- Philip (8 April 1605 – 17 September 1665), king of Spain
- Maria Anna (18 August 1606 – 13 May 1646), empress of the Holy Roman Empire
- Charles (14 September 1607 – 30 July 1632)
- Ferdinand (16 May 1609 – 9 November 1641), a cardinal
- Margaret (24 May 1610 – 11 March 1617)
- Alphonse Maurice (22 September 1611 – 16 September 1612)

== Ancestors ==
Ancestors of Margaret of Austria, Queen of Spain

16. Maximilian I, Holy Roman Emperor
8. Philip I of Castile (= 28)
17. Mary of Burgundy
4. Ferdinand I, Holy Roman Emperor (=14)
18. Ferdinand II of Aragon
9. Joanna of Castile (= 29)
19. Isabella I of Castile
2. Charles II of Austria
20. Casimir IV Jagiellon
10. Vladislas II of Bohemia and Hungary (= 30)
21. Elisabeth of Austria
5. Anna of Bohemia and Hungary (=15)
22. Gaston de Foix, Count of Candale
11. Anna of Foix-Candale (= 31)
23. Catherine of Foix
1. Margaret of Austria
24. Albert IV, Duke of Bavaria
12. William IV, Duke of Bavaria
25. Kunigunde of Austria
6. Albert V, Duke of Bavaria
26. Philip I, Margrave of Baden
13. Marie of Baden-Sponheim
27. Elisabeth of the Palatinate
3. Maria Anna of Bavaria
28. Philip I of Castile (= 8)
14. Ferdinand I, Holy Roman Emperor (= 4)
29. Joanna of Castile (= 9)
7. Anna of Austria
30. Vladislas II of Bohemia and Hungary (= 10)
15. Anna of Bohemia and Hungary (= 5)
31. Anna of Foix-Candale (= 11)

== Depiction in media ==
Margaret of Austria is portrayed by Elena Rivera in the Spanish TV show El ministerio del tiempo.

Actress Viveca Lindfors portrayed Margaret in the 1948 Hollywood movie Adventures of Don Juan.

== Bibliography ==
- Magdalena S. Sánchez. Pious and Political Images of a Habsburg Woman at the Court of Philip III (1598–1621). in: Magdalena S. Sánchez and Alain Saint-Saëns (ed.), Spanish women in the golden age: images and realities. Greenwood Publishing Group (1996).

Margaret of Austria, Queen of Spain House of Habsburg Born: 25 December 1584 Died: 3 October 1611
Royal titles
| Vacant Title last held by Anna of Austria | Queen consort of Spain and Portugal; 1598–1611 | Vacant Title next held by Elisabeth of France |
