= Infante Alonso of Spain =

Spanish infante who died in childhood

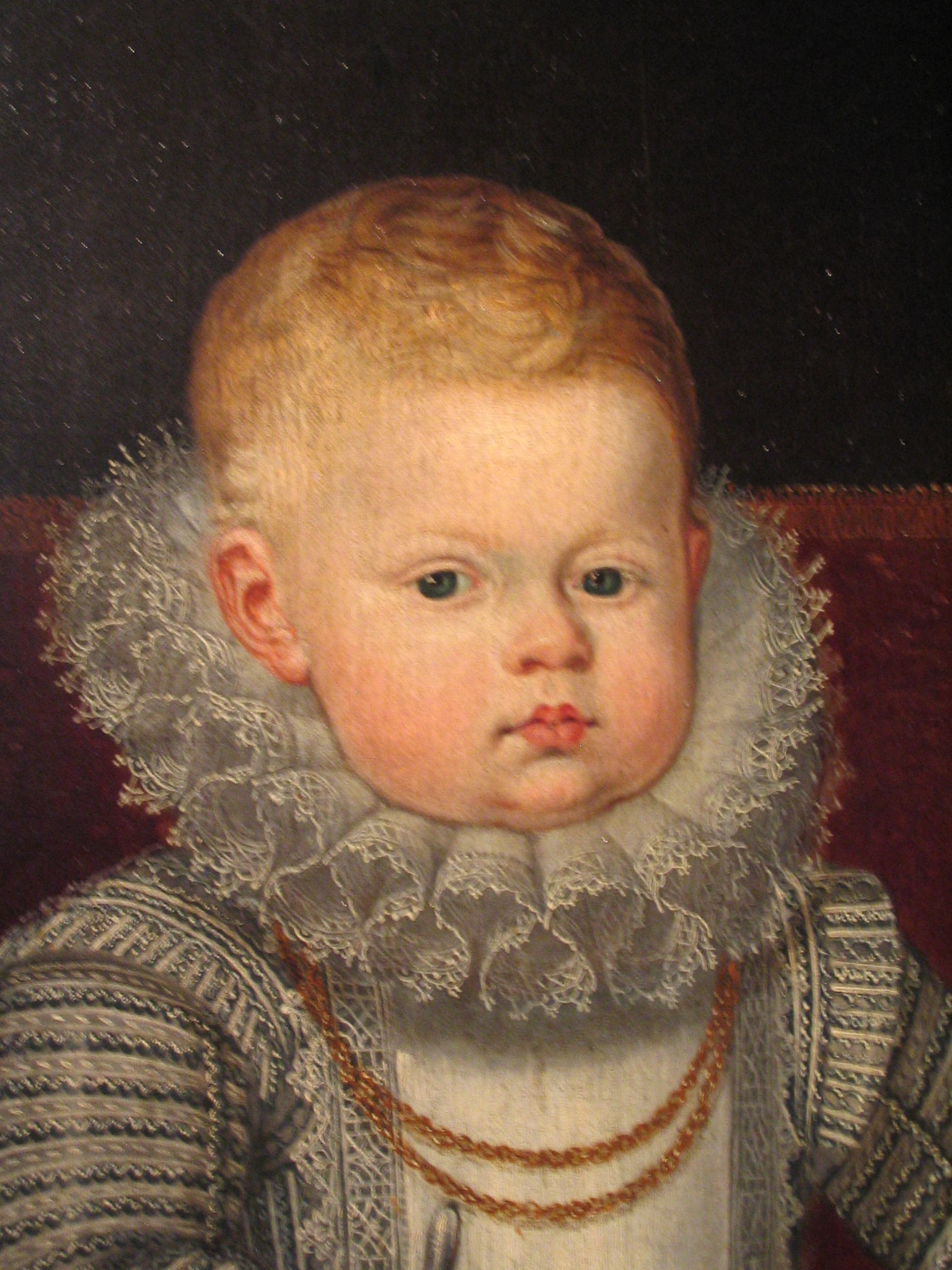
- Detail of the portrait of the infante and his brothers Ferdinand and Margaret by Bartolomé González in the Kunsthistorisches Museum, Vienna
- Born: 22 September 1611; Madrid
- Died: 16 September 1612 (aged 11 months 25 days); Madrid
- Burial: Panteon de Infantes, El Escorial
- Father: Philip III of Spain
- Mother: Margaret of Austria

Alonso of Spain (22 September 1611 – 16 September 1612) was an infante of Spain, who died in childhood.

== Life ==
He was born in the Monastery of El Escorial, from the marriage of Philip III of Spain and Margaret of Austria.

He was the last of the couple’s eight children and the fourth male. His mother died as a consequence of his birth a few days later. This circumstance earned him the nickname of El Caro (the Dear), for which he was known in his short life as Don Alonso el Caro.

He was baptized in his birthplace where he was born, on 8 October of that same year on the feast of Saint Francis of Assisi. The baptism was not public and festive, due to the recent death of his mother. His godparents at baptism were his older siblings Anne and Philip, the sacrament being administered by the Patriarch of the West Indies, Diego de Guzmán. He was carried to the baptismal font by his cousin Philip Emmanuel of Savoy, Prince of Piedmont. (Note: In Spanish royal baptisms, the honour of bringing the newborn to the baptismal font was second in importance only to the one of being godparent.)

The choice of the name Alonso, or Alfonso, was related to the memory of the ancient kings of Castile.

He died before he was one year old and was taken to the monastery of San Lorenzo de El Escorial. His tomb is located in the sixth chamber of the Panteón of Infantes, commonly known as the nursery mausoleum, under the inscription:

ALPHONSVS, PHILIPPI III FILIVS

As happened one year before with the death of his wife Margaret, Philip accepted his son’s death with resignation.
