= Maria Anna of Spain =

Holy Roman Empress from 1637 to 1646

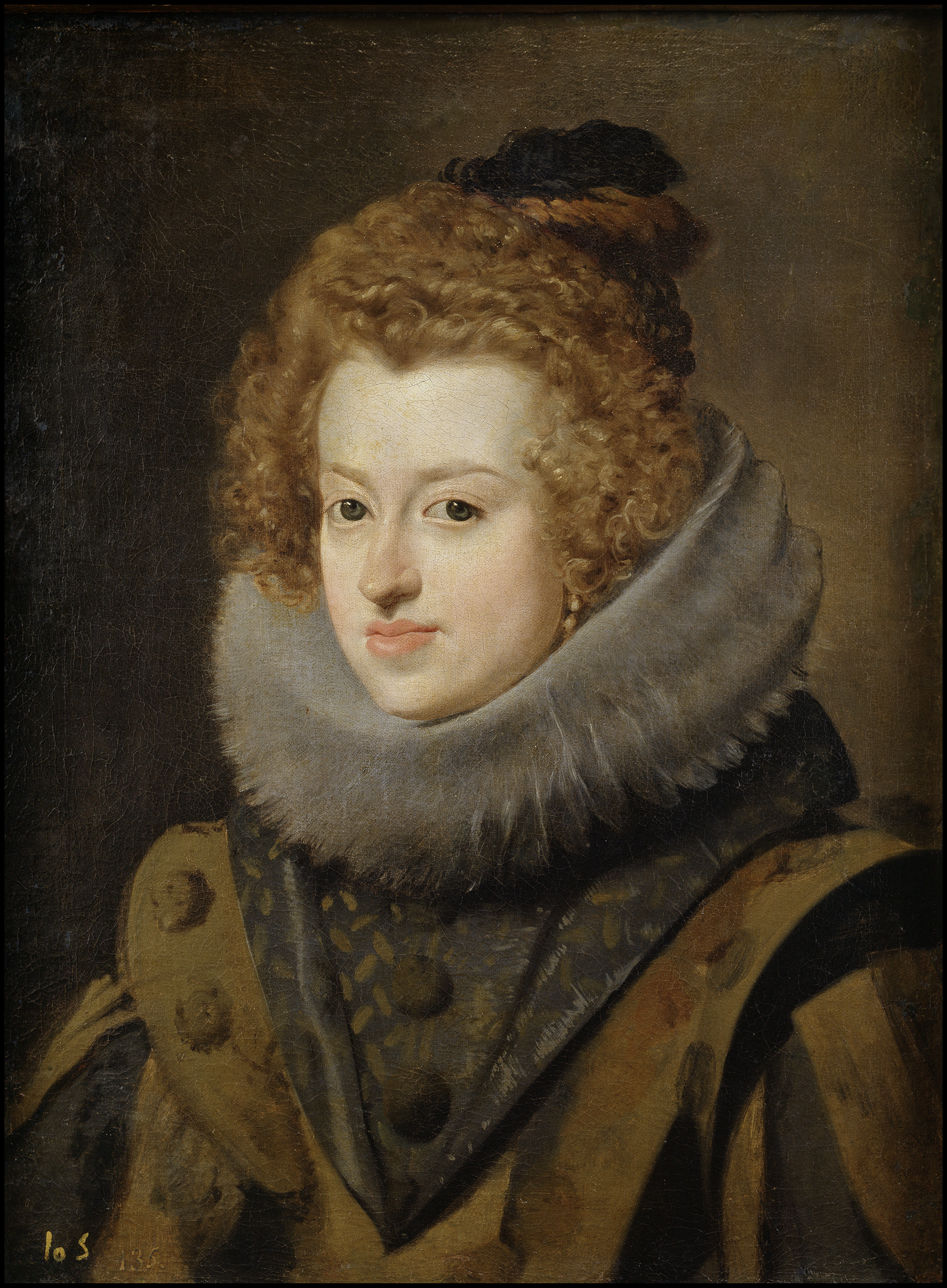
- Portrait of Maria Anna by Diego Velázquez, 1630

Holy Roman Empress
- Tenure: 15 February 1637 – 13 May 1646
- Born: 18 August 1606; El Escorial, Spain
- Died: 13 May 1646 (aged 39); Linz, Archduchy of Austria, Holy Roman Empire
- Burial: Imperial Crypt
- Spouse: Ferdinand III, Holy Roman Emperor (m. 1631)
- Issue: Ferdinand IV, King of the Romans; Maria Anna, Queen of Spain; Leopold I, Holy Roman Emperor
Names
- Spanish: María Ana de Austria y Austria
- House: Habsburg
- Father: Philip III of Spain
- Mother: Margaret of Austria

Maria Anna of Spain (18 August 1606 – 13 May 1646) was a Holy Roman Empress and Queen of Germany, Hungary and Bohemia by her marriage to Ferdinand III, Holy Roman Emperor. She acted as regent on several occasions during the absences of her husband, notably during his absence in Bohemia in 1645.

The daughter of King Philip III of Spain and of Margaret of Austria, she was considered a possible wife for Charles, Prince of Wales, and the prospect of this "Spanish match" provoked a domestic and political crisis in the kingdoms of England and Scotland. In the imperial court in Vienna, her tastes in fashion and music strongly favored Spanish culture and she encouraged the strengthening of relations between the Imperial and the Spanish branches of the House of Habsburg.

== Biography ==
=== Early life ===
Infanta Maria Anna of Spain was born in the Palace of El Escorial, near Madrid, on 18 August 1606 as the fourth child and third (but second surviving) daughter of King Philip III of Spain and his wife, Margaret of Austria, archduchess of the Inner Austrian branch of the House of Habsburg. Of her seven siblings, only four survived infancy: Anna (later wife of King Louis XIII of France), Philip IV of Spain, Charles (who died young in 1632) and Ferdinand (later Cardinal-Infante and Governor of the Spanish Netherlands). Maria Anna's parents were closely related; her father was her mother's first cousin once removed, and they were connected through multiple familial lines of descent. On her father's side, she was the granddaughter of King Philip II of Spain, and his fourth wife and niece, Archduchess Anna of Austria, and on her mother's side, she was the granddaughter of Charles II, Archduke of Inner Austria and his wife and niece, Princess Maria Anna of Bavaria.

=== Betrothals ===
As an Infanta and a Habsburg, Maria Anna was a valuable marital prize. She was betrothed as an adolescent to Archduke John-Charles, her first cousin and the eldest son and heir of Ferdinand II, Holy Roman Emperor and his first wife, Maria Anna of Bavaria. John-Charles died in 1618, and the marriage did not take place.

Maria Anna was suggested as a bride for Charles, Prince of Wales but the prospect of a "Spanish match" caused a political crisis in England and Scotland. In 1623, the Prince of Wales, accompanied by George Villiers, 1st Duke of Buckingham, visited Madrid to meet his intended bride. However, Maria Anna did not wish to marry a Protestant, Charles would not convert to Catholicism, and dynastic marriage with the House of Stuart. Charles later married Henrietta Maria of France of the House of Bourbon, a devout Catholic.

=== Marriage ===
After a lengthy series of negotiations, Maria Anna was betrothed to Archduke Ferdinand, the younger brother of her first fiancé and heir of Emperor Ferdinand II in 1626. That same year Ferdinand was crowned King of Hungary and in 1627 he was crowned King of Bohemia. Despite the desire of the groom for Maria Anna's confessor to be the Jesuit Ambrosio de Peñalosa, the appointment eventually went to Capuchin Diego Quiroga. In the marriage contract signed by both parties in 1628, Maria Anna was granted the right to retain her rights of inheritance over the Spanish throne, a marked contrast to her elder sister Infanta Anna, who was forced to renounce her rights of inheritance when she married King Louis XIII of France in 1615.

Maria Anna left Madrid for Vienna in December 1629, fully three years after her engagement and nearly five years after the proposal for marriage was first mooted. The journey itself took close to a year to complete and was riddled by complications and crises. In Genoa an outbreak of the plague in the Italian Peninsula prevented the infanta's party from stopping in Bologna, where Cardinal Antonio Barberini, nephew of Pope Urban VIII, was waiting for the infanta to give her the Golden Rose. (The award was later given in Naples) The Infanta crossed the Papal States after she had made a pilgrimage to the Basilica della Santa Casa. On that section of her journey, Maria Anna was accompanied by Roman aristocracy, led by another nephew of Pope Urban VIII, Taddeo Barberini, Prince of Palestrina. On 26 January 1631, she arrived in Trieste, where she met Archduke Leopold Wilhelm of Austria, her future brother-in-law, who would first stand in for his brother at a wedding by proxy and then escort the infanta to Vienna. Maria Anna was married to King Ferdinand of Hungary and Bohemia per procura, with Archduke Leopold Wilhelm serving as the proxy.

King Ferdinand, not trusting the previous portraits that he had seen of the infanta, secretly accompanied the royal Oberhofmeister to an audience with the infanta hidden among a group of nobles. Struck by Maria Anna's beauty, King Ferdinand immediately revealed his identity and began a conversation with her in Spanish. The love and respect that the future emperor felt for his wife seemed to last throughout their marriage, and he took no mistresses nor sired any illegitimate children.

In Vienna on 20 February 1631, Maria Anna was married to King Ferdinand of Hungary-Bohemia and the match was celebrated with a month of festivities. Maria Anna was described by peers as happy-tempered, friendly and intelligent, and her contemporaries felt that she cheered and comforted the rather melancholic Ferdinand.

=== Holy Roman Empress and German Queen ===
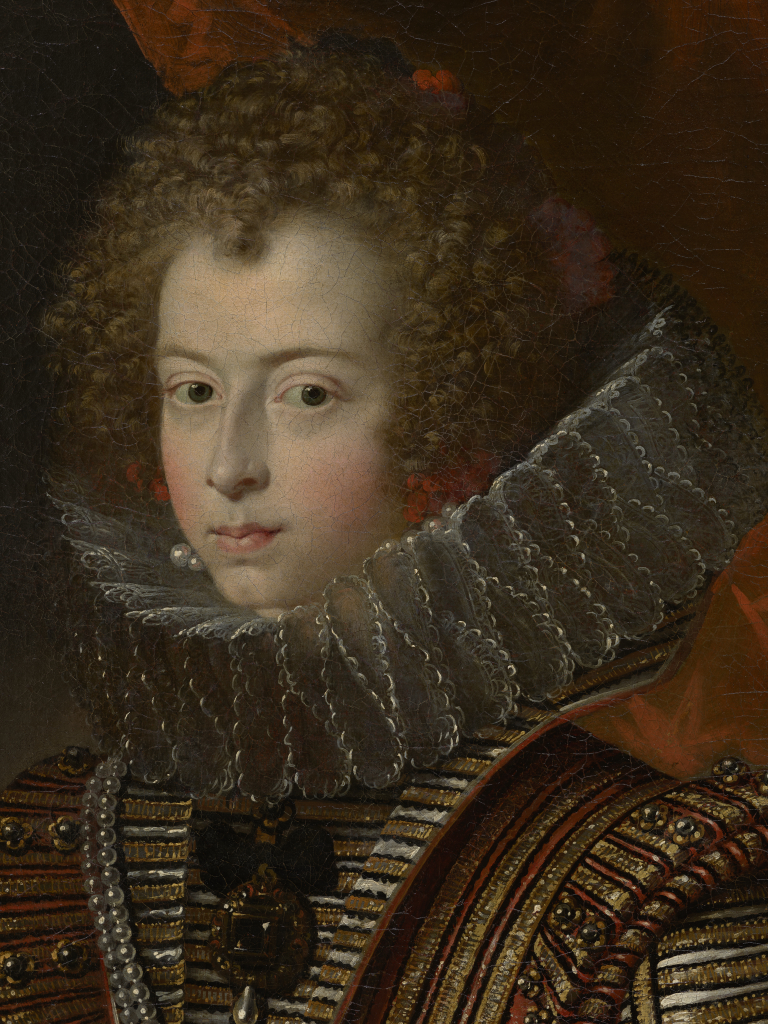
Detail of the portrait of Infanta Maria Ana of Austria by Felipe Diricksen, 1630 (Portland Art Museum)

Maria Anna brough Spanish fashion, theatre, dance and music (including the first sounded guitar) to the imperial court. As the wife of the heir, she maintained good relations with all members of her husband's family, but had a complicated relationship with Ferdinand's stepmother, Empress Dowager Eleonora Gonzaga, with whom she competed for influence at court. Maria Anna paid much attention to the arts, especially painting, and collected works of Italian, Spanish and Flemish painters of the late Renaissance and early Baroque periods.

In Regensburg on 22 December 1636, Ferdinand was elected as King of the Romans, and a week later, he was crowned by the Archbishop of Mainz. Maria Anna was crowned Queen of Germany one month later, on 21 January 1637. After his father's death, on 15 February 1637, Ferdinand became Holy Roman Emperor under the regnal name of Ferdinand III and also became sovereign king of Hungary and Bohemia. As his wife, she received the titles of Holy Roman Empress and sovereign queen. Her coronation as Queen of Hungary took place in Pressburg during the Hungarian Diet of 1637–1638.

Maria Anna was an important mediator between the emperor and their Spanish relatives. Although she always defended the interests of her husband, she did not forget the interests of her brothers King Philip IV and the Cardinal-Infante. In her court, which was consisted mainly of Spaniards, the Spanish ambassador was a frequent guest. The emperor, during his absences from the Imperial court in Vienna, appointed his wife as regent, such as in 1645, during the Thirty Years' War, when he was in the Kingdom of Bohemia.

=== Death ===
In March 1645, Maria Anna and her children left Linz because of the approach of the Protestant Swedish army and moved to Vienna. By April, the army was ready to cross the Danube and threatened to occupy Vienna. In response, the Imperial family fled temporarily to Graz. After returning to Vienna, the Imperial family was forced to move again to Linz because of the plague. Maria Anna's sixth pregnancy became known in January 1646. Four months later, on 12 May at Linz Castle, she suddenly felt ill with fever and heavy bleeding and died the next morning. Her unborn child, a girl, was taken out alive from her womb. She was named Maria after her mother but lived only a few hours. On 24 May, both mother and daughter in the same coffin were moved to Vienna and buried in the Imperial Crypt, which already contained the coffins with the remains of the two sons of the empress who had died earlier. The funeral cortege was accompanied by the Spanish ambassador and the empress's maid of honor. Very upset by the death of his wife and child, the emperor was unable to attend the funeral. However, after returning to Vienna in late August, he finally paid his respects to the remains of Maria Anna, and in September, he announced the engagement of their eldest daughter, Maria Anna, with Balthasar Charles, Prince of Asturias. However, the prince died the following month shortly after the announcement. Members of the late empress' household who came with her from Spain, including her confessor and maids of honour, lived at the Imperial court in Vienna for a few more years after her death.

== Issue ==
During her marriage, Maria Anna gave birth to six children:

- Ferdinand IV (8 September 1633 – 9 July 1654), King of the Romans and titular King of Hungary and Bohemia.
- Maria Anna (23 December 1634 – 16 May 1696), who married her maternal uncle King Philip IV of Spain.
- Philip August (15 July 1637 – 22 June 1639), Archduke of Austria.
- Maximilian Thomas (21 December 1638 – 29 June 1639), Archduke of Austria.
- Leopold I, Holy Roman Emperor (9 June 1640 – 5 May 1705).
- Maria (born and died 13 May 1646), Archduchess of Austria.

== Ancestors ==
Ancestors of Maria Anna of Spain

8. Charles V, Holy Roman Emperor
4. Philip II of Spain
9. Isabella of Portugal
2. Philip III of Spain
10. Maximilian II, Holy Roman Emperor
5. Anna of Austria (≠ 15)
11. Maria of Austria
1. Maria Anna of Austria
12. Ferdinand I, Holy Roman Emperor
6. Charles II, Archduke of Austria
13. Anne of Bohemia and Hungary
3. Margaret of Austria
14. Albert V, Duke of Bavaria
7. Maria Anna of Bavaria
15. Anna of Austria (≠ 5)

== Depictions in art ==
Claire Jowitt views the character of princess Donusa in Massinger's 1624 play The Renegado as an allegory of the Infanta during the failed marriage attempt.

In 1634, the Spanish poet and playwright Pedro Calderón de la Barca, in honour of the victory of the Spaniards and the Austrians over the Swedes in the Battle of Nördlingen, set in Madrid a performance in which Maria Anna, with her husband, was one of the actors.

Save a few portraits of Maria Anna as child, almost all of them are included in the collection of the Kunsthistorisches Museum in Vienna. In the earliest of those paintings, made by Juan Pantoja de la Cruz, she is shown at one year of age. The collection of the Portland Art Museum includes a 1630s portrait of Maria, painted by Felipe Diriksen. A portrait of the Infanta Maria Anna, then Queen of Hungary and Bohemia, made by Diego Velázquez, court painter at Madrid, was part of the collection of the Museo del Prado. Portraits of the Empress made by Frans Luycx (painter at the court in Vienna), Bartolomé González y Serrano, Rodrigo de Villandrando, Justus Sustermans, Juan van der Hamen and other unknown authors are also stored in the collections of the Kunsthistorisches Museum, Museo del Prado, the gallery of the Schloss Esterházy in Eisenstadt and the Musée Fesch in Ajaccio.

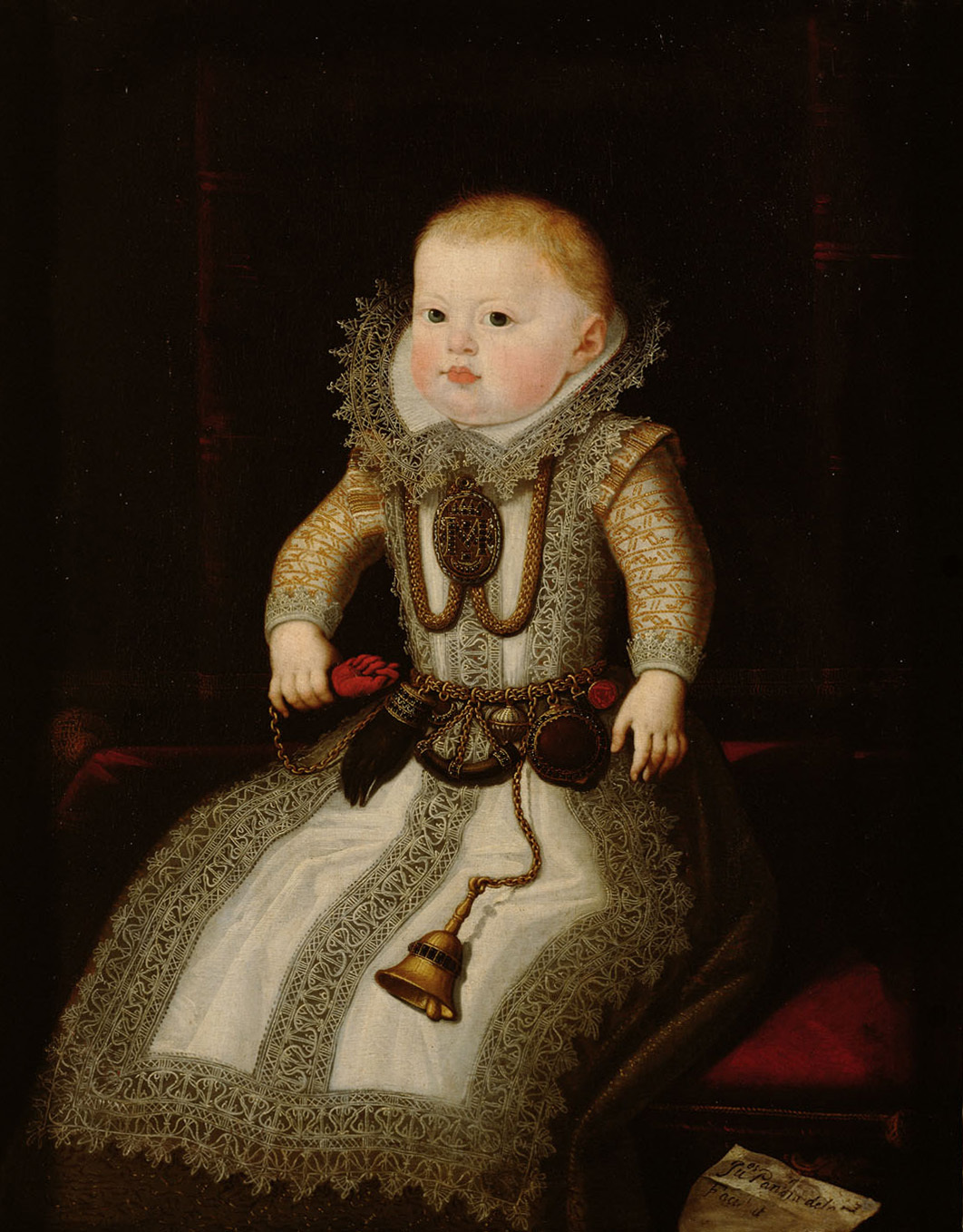
Infantin Maria Anna, Kaiserin, im Alter von 4 bis 5 Monaten, Bildnis in ganzer Figur (1607), by Juan Pantoja de la Cruz, Kunsthistorisches Museum, Vienna.

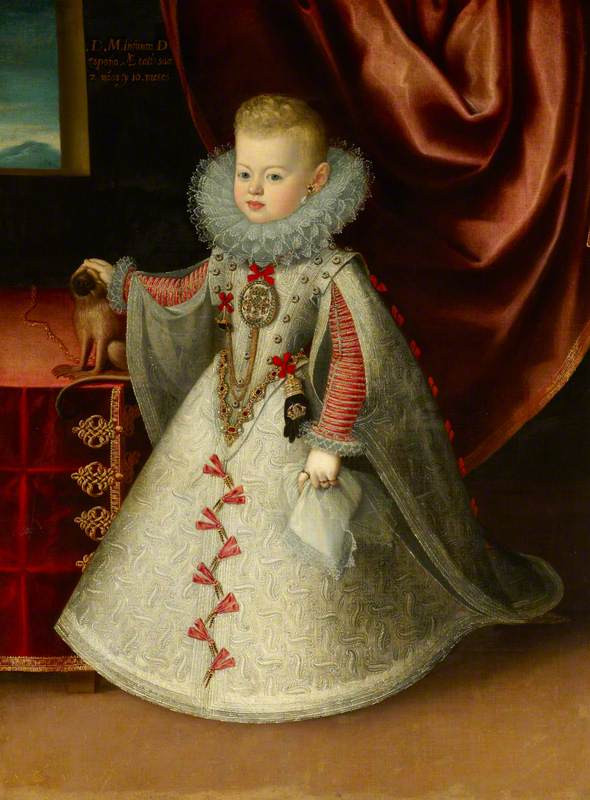
Maria Anna, Infanta of Spain, Later Archduchess of Austria, Queen of Hungary and Empress, as a child, by Bartolomé González y Serrano, National Trust, Cliveden.

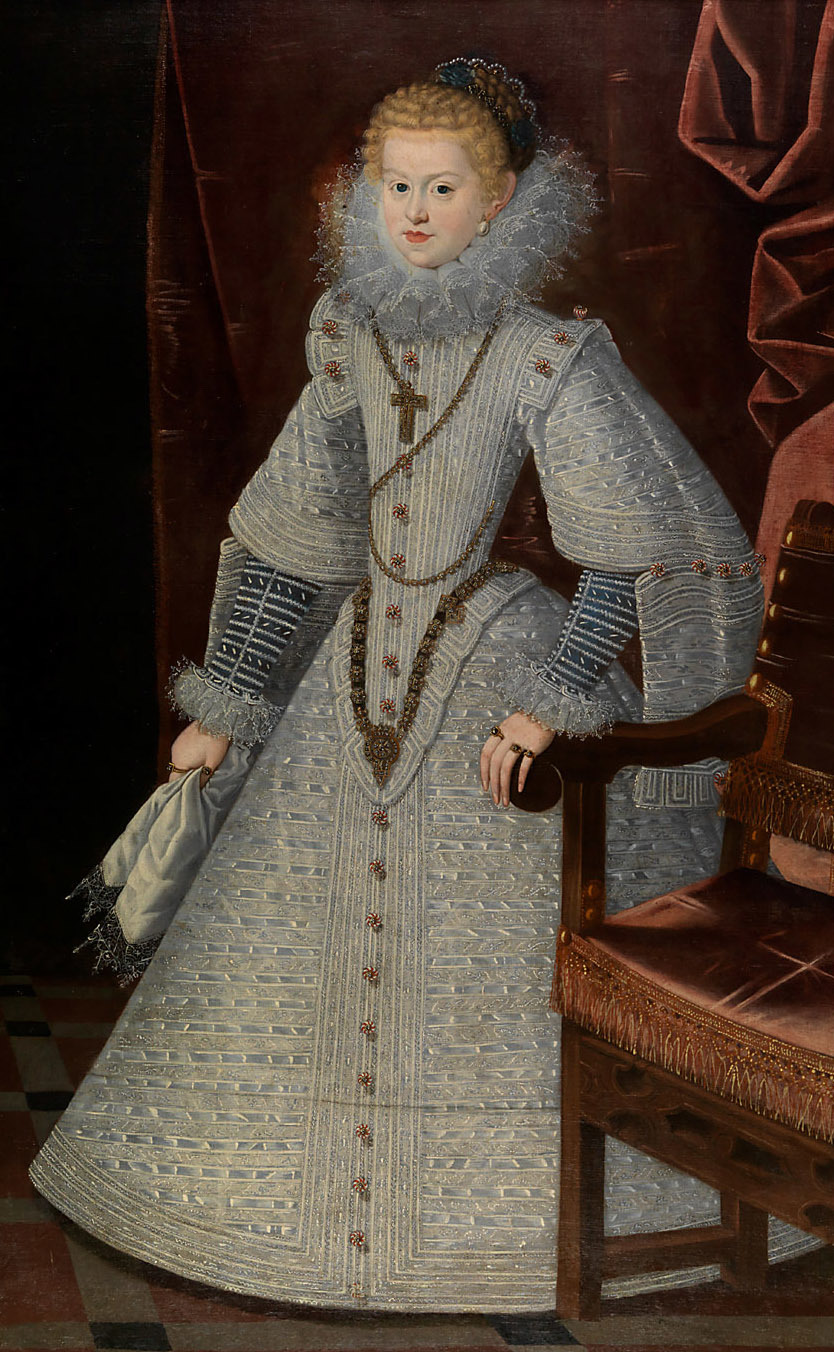
Infantin Maria Anna, Kaiserin, in ganzer Figur (1617), by Bartolomé González y Serrano, Kunsthistorisches Museum, Vienna.

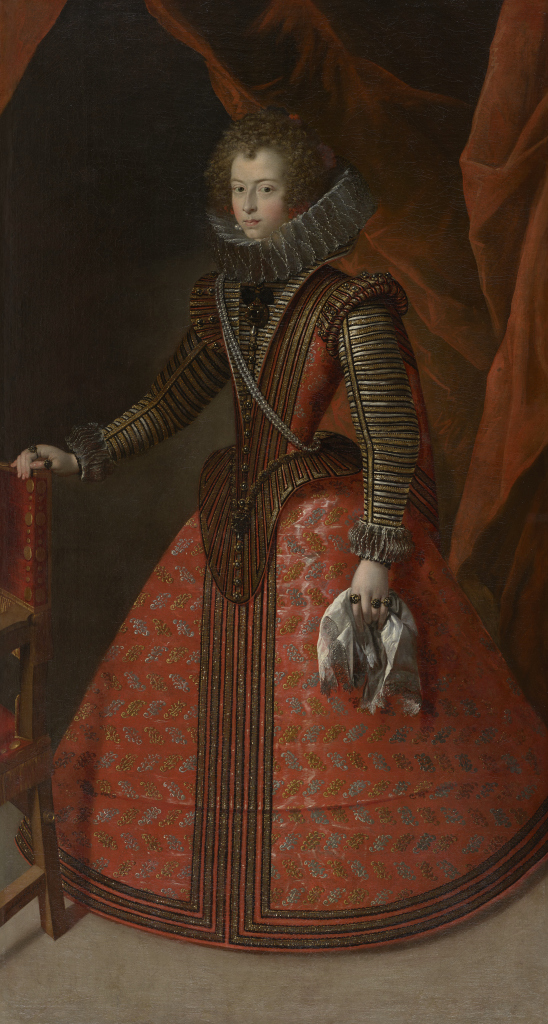
Retrato de la infanta María Ana de Austria (1630), by Felipe Diricksen, Portland Art Museum

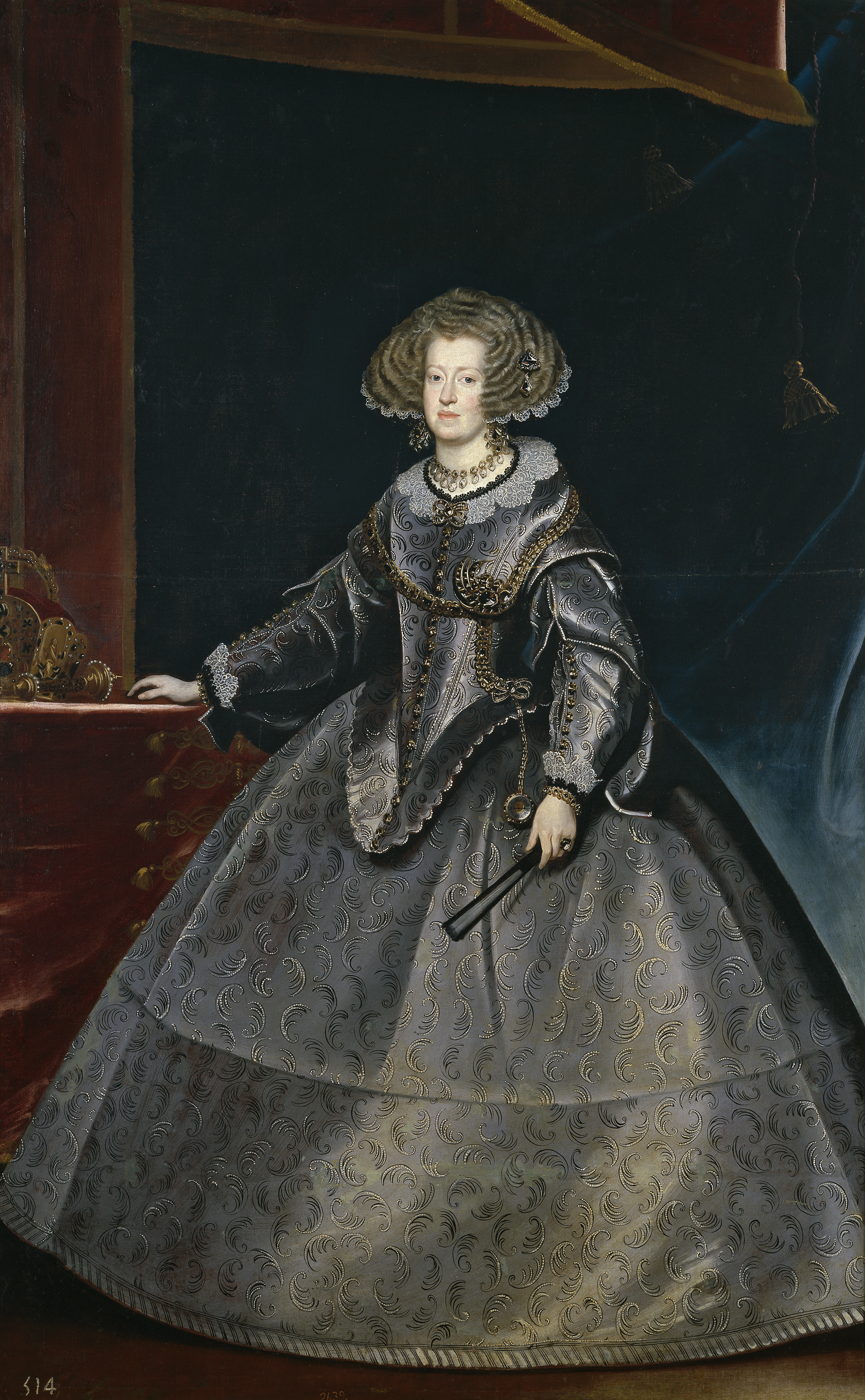
María de Austria, reina de Hungría (1635), by Frans Luycx, Museo del Prado, Madrid.

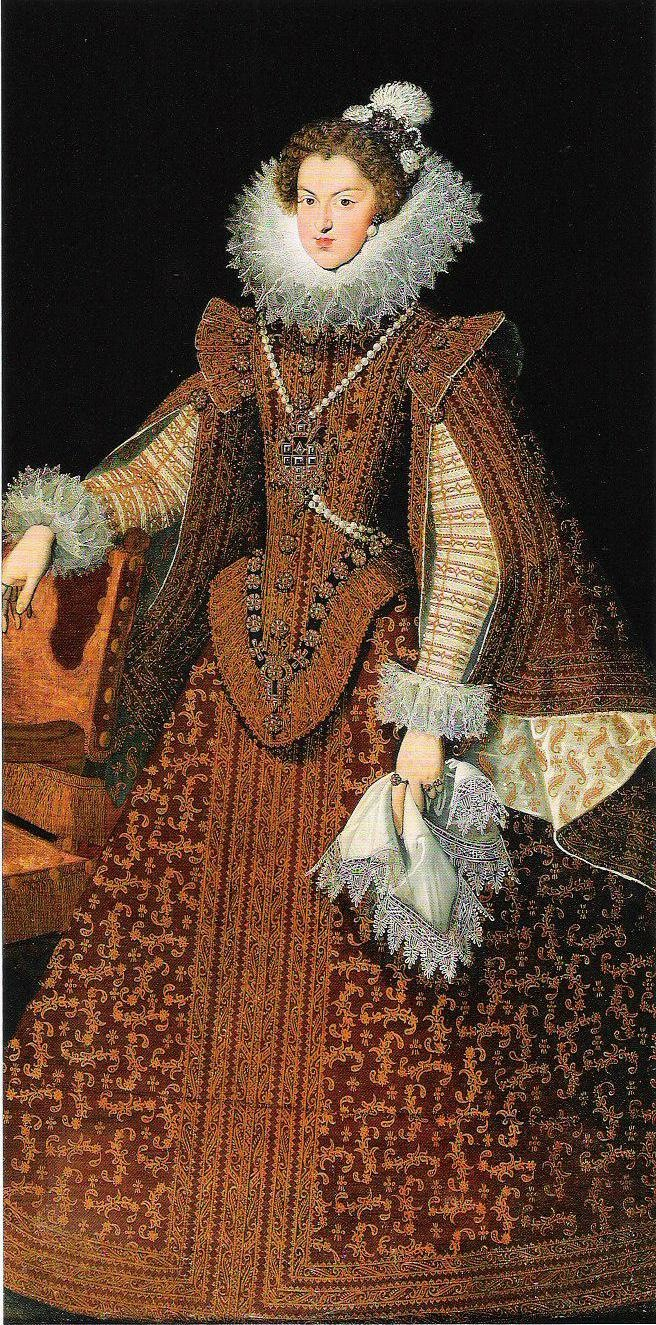
María Ana de Austria (c. 1630), by Juan van der Hamen, Musée Fesch, Ajaccio.

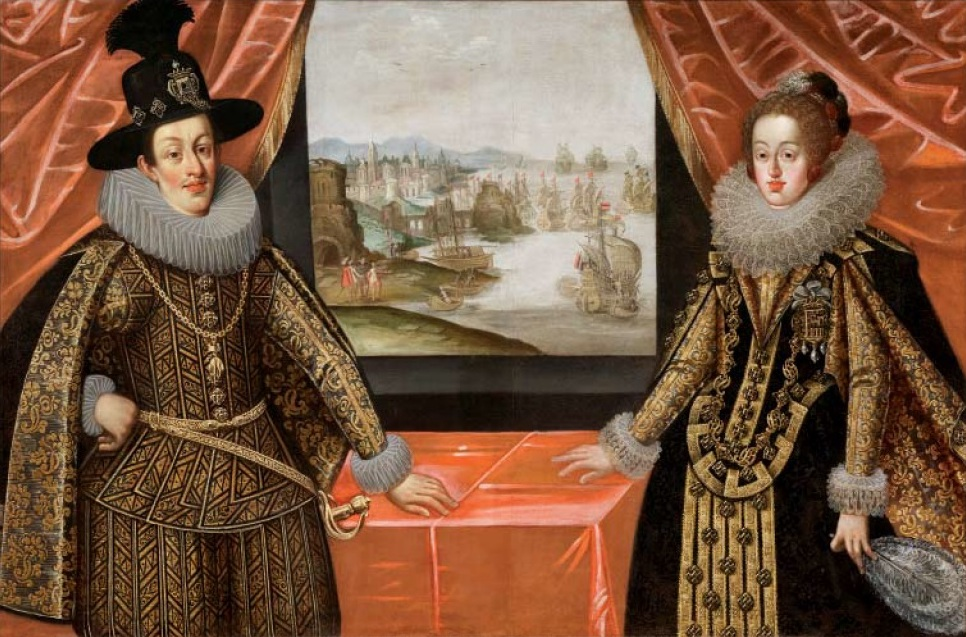
Ölgemälde von Ferdinand III. von Habsburg und seiner ersten Gemahlin Maria Anna von Spanien (1628/30) by Justus Sustermans, Schloss Esterházy, Eisenstadt.

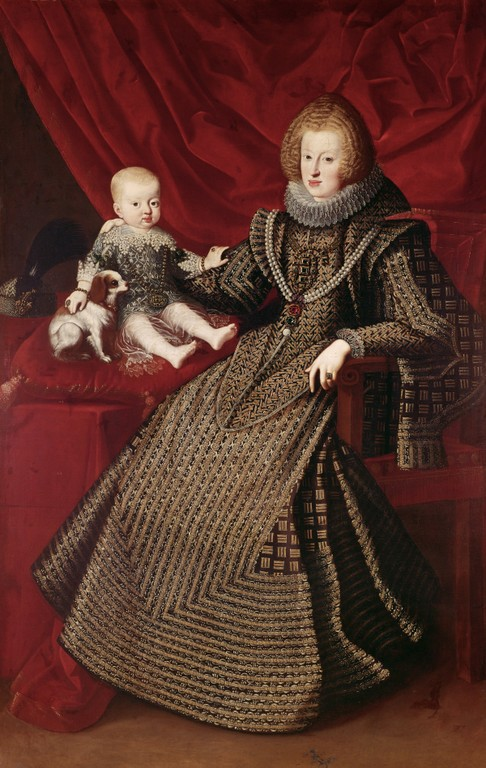
Infantin Maria Anna, Kaiserin, in ganzer Figur mit ihrem erstgeborenen Sohn Ferdinand (1634), Anonymous, Kunsthistorisches Museum, Vienna.

== Notes ==
Maria Anna of Spain House of Habsburg Born: 18 August 1606 Died: 13 May 1646
Royal titles
Preceded by Eleonore Gonzaga	Empress of the Holy Roman Empire; German Queen, Archduchess consort of Austria; 1637–1646	Vacant Title next held by Maria Leopoldine of Austria
Preceded by Eleonore Gonzaga	Queen consort of Hungary and Bohemia; 1631–1646	Vacant Title next held by Maria Leopoldine of Austria
