= Parador de Almagro =

Hotel in Spain

Coordinates: 38.88610°N 3.71376°W

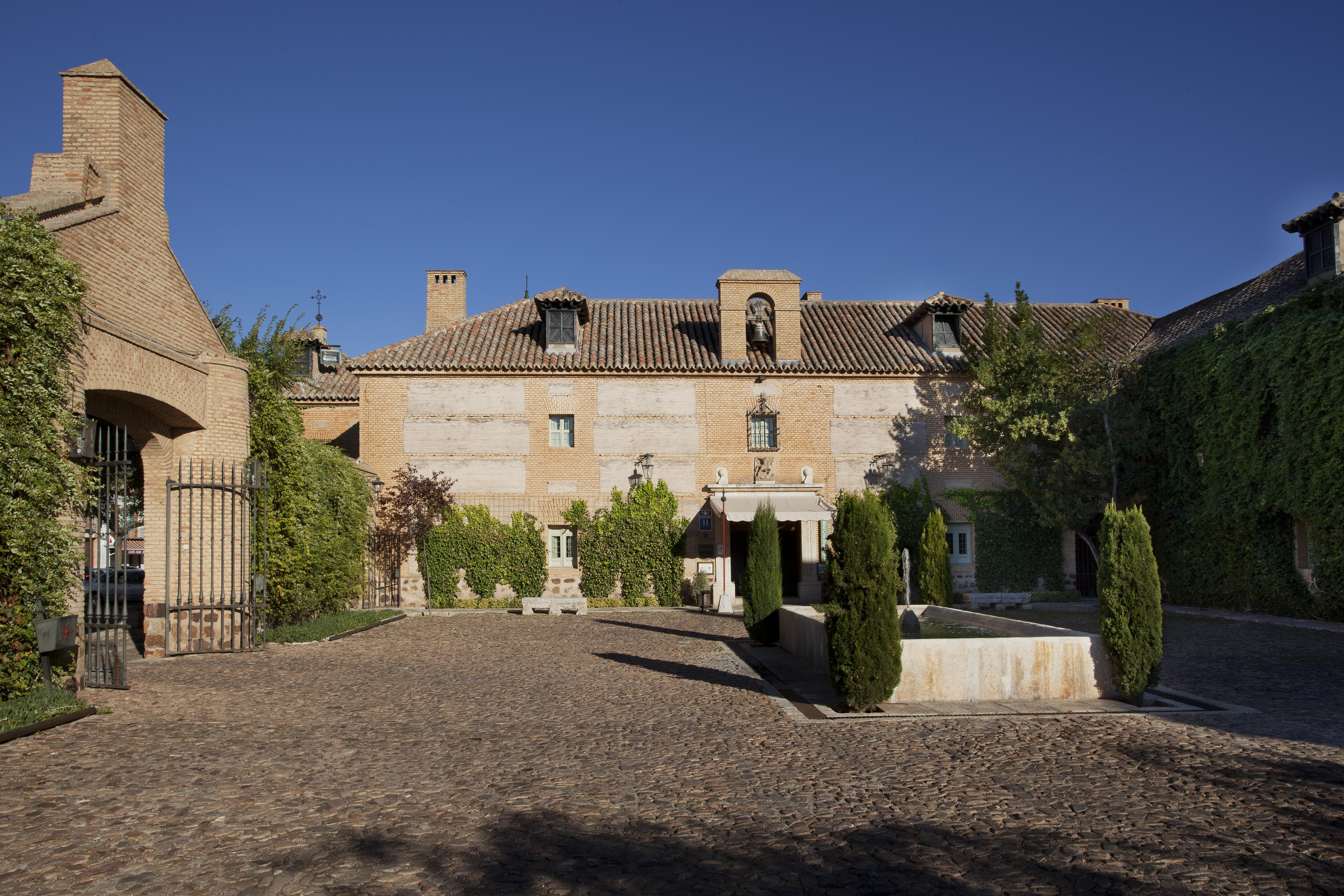
- Interactive map of the Parador de Almagro area
- Alternative names: Convento de Santa Catalina de Siena
- Hotel chain: Paradores

General information
- Type: Convent converted to hotel
- Architectural style: Renaissance (School of Toledo), Baroque
- Location: Ronda San Francisco, 31, Almagro (Ciudad Real), Spain
- Year built: 1603–1979
- Inaugurated: 26 September 1979

Design and construction
- Architect: Nicolás Vergara el Mozo

Renovating team
- Architects: Juan Palazuelo de la Peña; Ramón Melgarejo Rueda

Website
- Parador de Almagro

The Parador de Almagro, also known as the Convento de Santa Catalina de Siena, is a four-star Parador hotel located in the town of Almagro, in the province of Ciudad Real, in the autonomous community of Castile-La Mancha, Spain. It was converted from the ruins of the seventeenth century Franciscan Convent of Santa Catalina. It was irretrievably damaged during the Spanish Civil War. In 1969 it was ceded to the Spanish government for conversion into a Parador. Work on the rebuilding and conversion began in 1972. The architects copied the architectural style of the original building, using materials sourced locally. For hotel use the historical layout of the convent was extended into the surrounding grounds with the construction of fifty-five guest rooms, numerous hospitality areas and fourteen patios.

The Parador was inaugurated by Queen Sofía of Spain in 1979. It is one of the most popular Paradores in Castile-La Mancha, with a capacity for 106 guests. Forty years after the opening of the Parador, portraits seized by the forces of Francisco Franco during the Civil War were found to be displayed on the walls and were subsequently returned to their rightful owners.

== The original building and its history ==
The Franciscan Convent de Santa Catalina in Almagro was built by Jerónimo de Ávila y de la Cueva in memory of his wife Catalina de Sanabria. 15,000 square metres of land had been purchased for its development outside the town walls to the southeast. Construction began in 1603 and lasted fourteen years, although it began to be lived in by Franciscan monks in 1612. The convent continued in operation for 330 years.

It was originally small, consisting of a church and two L-shaped, two-storey conventual buildings which, with the sacristy, enclosed a small cloister. The buildings were located in the northwest corner of the convent garden, much of which was orchard and all of which was enclosed by a high cob wall with tile capping.

The original architect was said to be Nicolás Vergara el Mozo. He designed the buildings in the Renaissance style of the Toledo School and built in brick, cob, stone and wood, topped with Mudéjar tiling. Different kinds of soil, sand, gypsum, lime and stone from the region of La Mancha were the basic elements.

In the 18th century the church was enlarged with two Baroque chapels, and two further conventual buildings, identical to the originals, were erected. In the 19th century another similar conventual building was added.

At the start of the Spanish Civil War in 1936 the building was severely damaged and many of the monks fled or were killed. Those in the community who remained in the convent finally left in 1942 owing to their reduced numbers. Local people made partial attempts to restore the building and used a section of it as a school.

In 1963 negotiations began between the town council of Almagro and the Spanish government with the aim of converting the building into a Parador de Turismo. On 24 April 1967 the Minister for Information and Tourism, Manuel Fraga, visited Almagro. His inspection resulted in a government grant of 6.5 million pesetas for the project, but the budget for the town council's plans for the conversion far exceeded this figure. Unable to fund the hotel project, in 1969 the town council ceded the building and the land around it to the Ministry of Information and Tourism.

== Conversion to a Parador ==
=== Preparation ===
When it was taken over by the Ministry the convent was in a state of ruin and the few walls left standing were in a poor condition following repairs done badly since 1936. Only the church retained its original architectural structure and the damage it had suffered was not serious.

Though the convent was not ceded to the government until 1969, work on the design for a Parador began in 1967, sponsored by the town council of Almagro. The Ministry, once it gained control, appointed two architects: Juan Palazuelo de la Peña (1927–2007) and Ramón Melgarejo Rueda (1927–2010). In a later report on the rehabilitation, Palazuelo commented that "the first and main guideline of the project was to preserve the spirit of the convent and the lines of its architectural style both as a whole and in the smallest detail." He went on: "Without ever losing the original style or architectural characteristics from sight, and without losing the sense of harmony or conventual spirit and atmosphere, plans were drawn up to accomplish the reconversion of the convent into a new building for a new use, that of a National Parador."

Palazuelo and Melgarejo considered the project "una cobra de auténtica artesania de la construcción" (a work of authentic construction craftsmanship) which should make use of historical materials and construction. The objective, while expanding the convent, was to use local materials and building techniques to make the finished construction appear to be of the seventeenth century; to create, as one architectural historian has noted, a stage or film set which would convince guests that they are actually in a genuinely ancient convent, built during the Renaissance.

Research carried out in the ruins before reconstruction began discovered the location of the sacristy, the chapter house, the main original stairway, and a small wine cellar, all of which were respected in the reconstruction. The foundations of conventual buildings whose existence had not previously been known (or which had never been built) were also discovered.

=== Construction ===
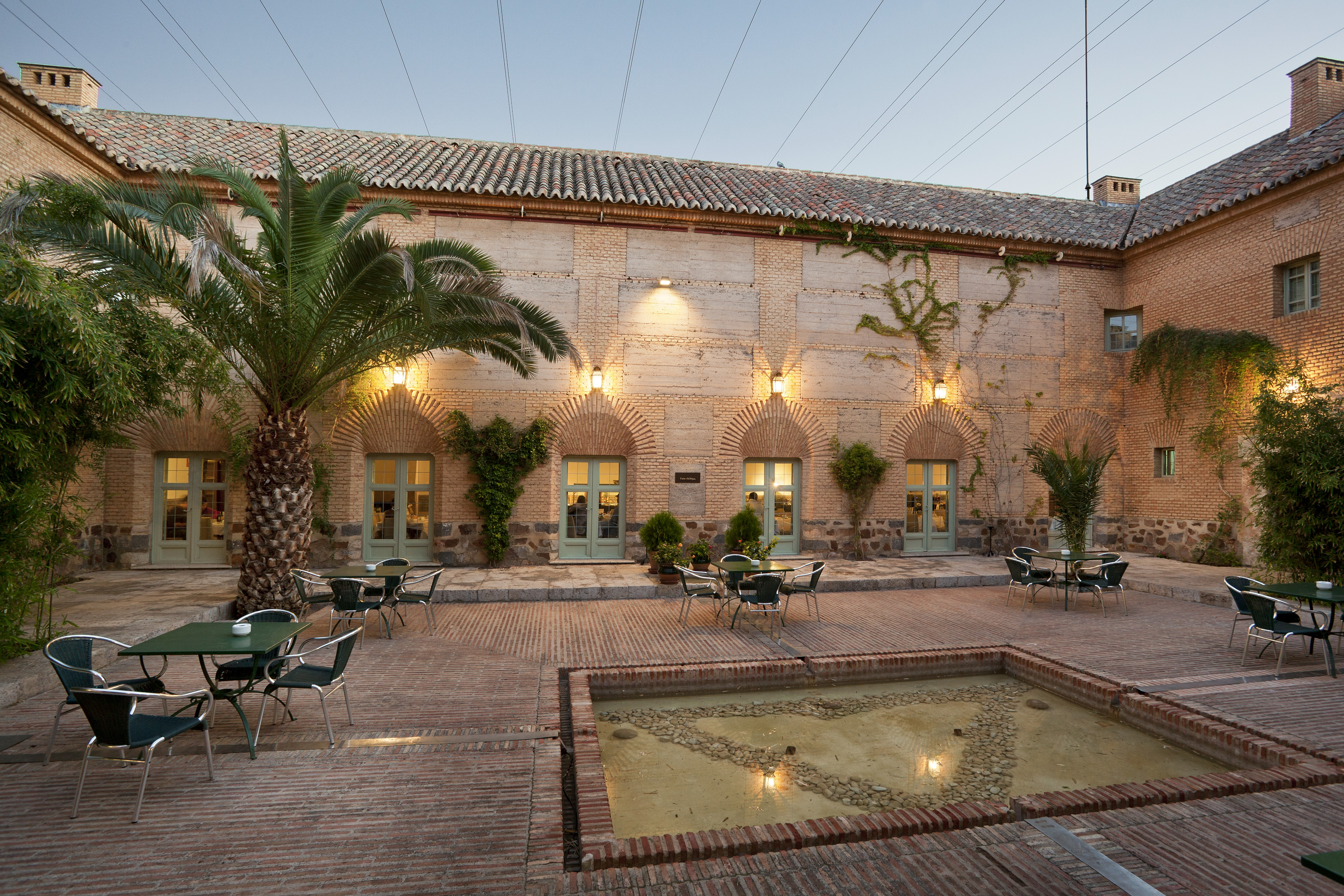
Patio del Agua

Construction work began in 1972. During the rebuilding and conversion the convent was greatly enlarged, with the addition of fourteen new patios. Collaborating with the architects was an architectural engineer, Mariano Santana de la Rubia. The restoration and reconstruction of the surviving elements of the property, together with the enlargement, landscaping and furnishing, took seven years to complete, including the purchase of more land when the project was enlarged further during the building work.

Artisan building methods were used in the same way as during the construction of the original convent and, as then, raw materials from around Almagro were utilised. In building the walls, the foundations were laid with rubble and built up with a mixture of brickwork and authentic cob with lime and gypsum mortar in the local style. The bricks were fired in a wood-burning kiln. Cornices were crowned with brick and sometimes carved limestone. Wooden frameworks were carved with lace tracery. Renaissance and baroque wood carvings were reproduced, copying authentic originals. Pavement flooring was laid with handmade, ceramic tiles fired in wood-burning kilns and interspersed with limestone paving hewn into strips and border tiles. Old red pantiles were used for the roofs. Staircase steps and risers were constructed of carved limestone or ceramic tiles and utilised wood nosings. Brick arches, vaults and splays were carved with elements from the styles of the School of Toledo. Typical of the original period, low fireplaces were carved of stone, while wrought iron grilles, railings and grates were forged in the authentic period style. Tile hangings of hand made glazed tiles were made in Talavera de la Reina, utilising Renaissance and baroque designs. Another characteristic local feature were the so-called 'Almagro arches' of splayed brick crowning doors and windows.

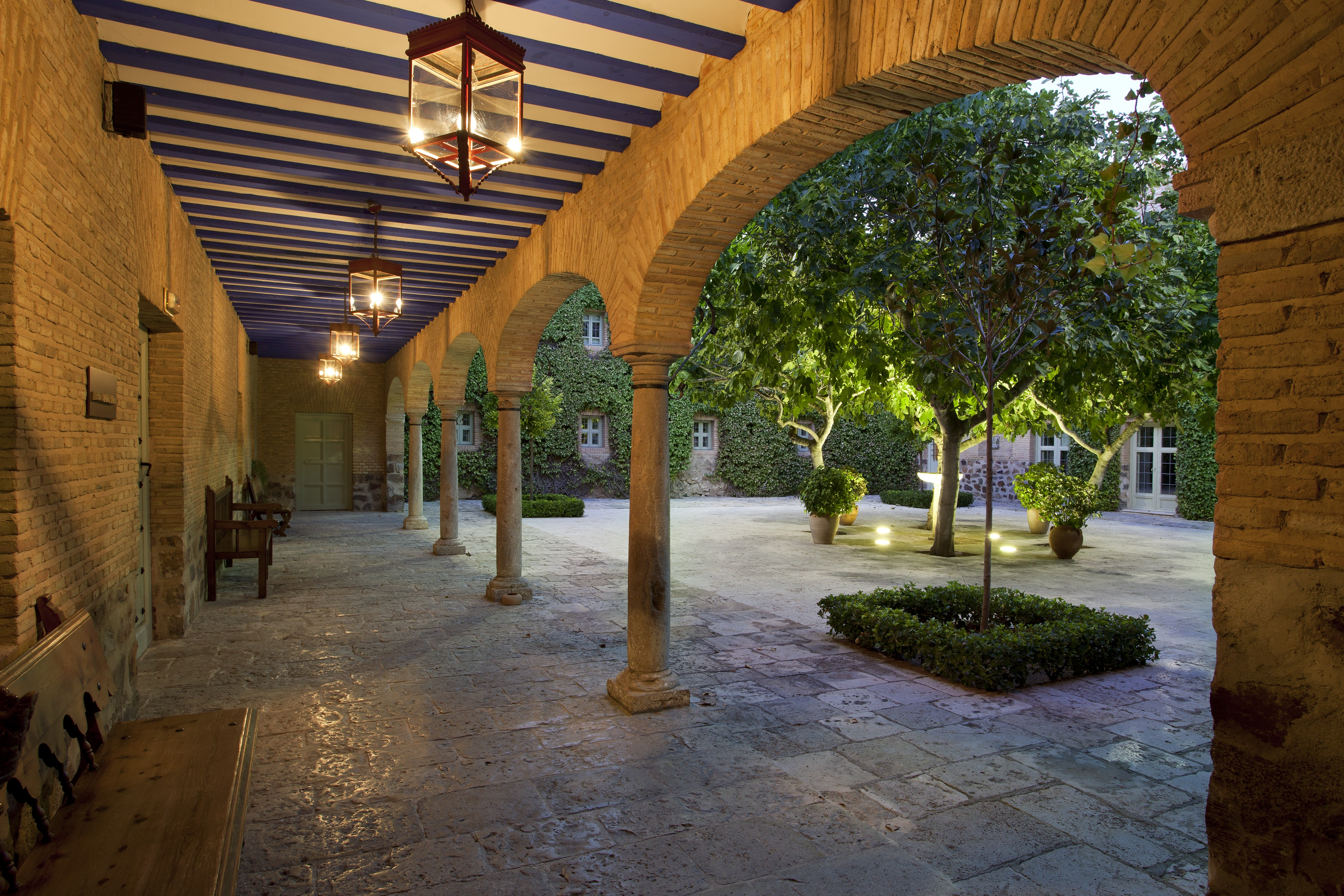
Patio de Los Arcos

Apart from the surviving original cloister, a number of patios were laid out in the expanded construction. Among the larger ones were the Patio de Los Arcos (Arches), the Patio del Boj (Boxwood), the Patio del Agua (Water) and the Patio Bodega (Wine Cellar). The original wine cellar was retained as part of the Parador bar and it features five enormous clay wine casks or amphorae (Spanish: tinajas), each one several metres high.

The interior decoration complied with the aim to reproduce that of the original monastery, and the furniture and other decorative pieces were in many cases antiques, the rest being copied from authentic pieces in the State's collections. The ceiling of the refectory (now the banquet hall and breakfast room of the Parador) was a 16th-century coffered original rescued from the old Renaissance University of Almagro, cut back in places and enlarged in others in order to fit its new location

=== Completion ===
The Parador de Almagro was completed in 1979. It had 55 bedrooms, with space for 104 guests. Some minor adjustments have since been made, and there are now 54 bedrooms, with space for 106 guests. The Parador's first director was Valentín Soria Capafons. The price of a room in high season in 1980 was 2,725 pesetas; breakfast cost 160 pesetas and lunch or dinner was 625 pesetas. The Parador was inaugurated by the Spanish Queen Sofía on 26 September 1979.

== Parador de Almagro in the present day ==
The Almagro Parador is among the most popular of the Paradores located in Castilla-La Mancha. The months of December and January are the weakest for bookings, while the strongest months are April for Easter celebrations, and July for the Almagro Classic Theatre Festival (Festival de Teatro Clásico de Almagro).

== Portraits seized by Francoist forces displayed in the Parador ==
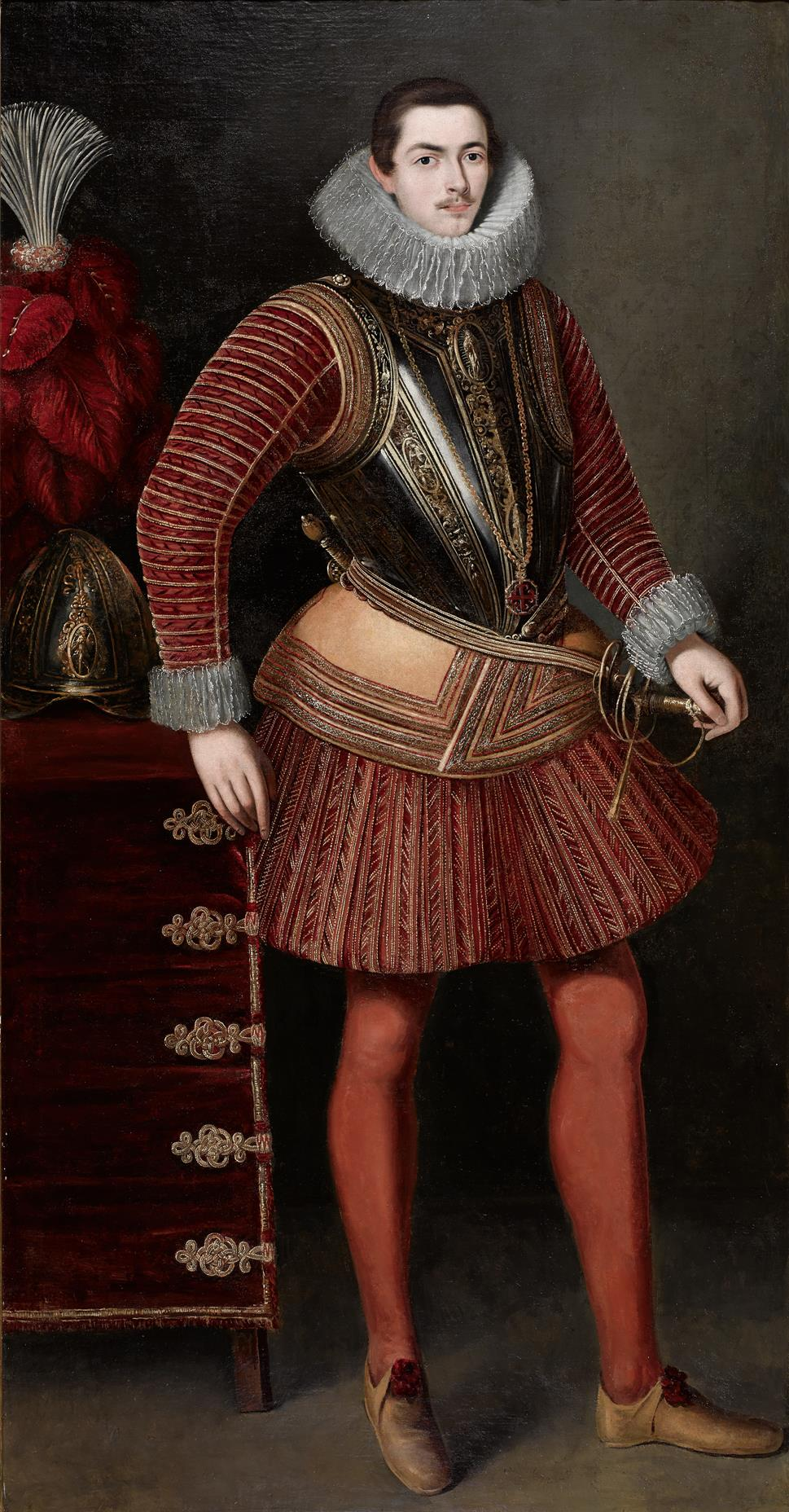
Retrato de un Caballero by Felipe Diricksen

Among the pictures which were hung in the Parador at Almagro when it opened were at least three seventeenth century portraits and one nineteenth century portrait which had been forcibly requisitioned by the Francoist army either during the Spanish Civil War (1936–1939), or shortly after, from the homes of two separate Republican families. The rightful owners had been searching for the pictures for over eighty years, despite their public display at Almagro for at least forty years.

The true ownership of the pictures came to light when Paradores de Turismo and Fundación Mapfre published a catalogue of an exhibition of items from the Paradores' artistic collection, which included the four portraits from Almagro. A member of one of the families and separately an art history teacher who was aware of the missing pictures belonging to the other family, browsing the catalogue, recognised the portraits which had been looted and which the families had subsequently not been able to locate.

In September 2022 in Bilbao the heirs of shipowner and prominent Basque nationalist Ramón de la Sota, whose assets were seized by the fascists in 1936, received back into their possession Retrato de un Caballero, 1623, by Cornelis van der Voort (1576–1624) and La Reina María Cristina de Borbón, c1833, by Luis de la Cruz y Ríos and workshop (1776–1853), both of which had been hanging on the walls of the Parador at Almagro until one of Sota's heirs located them in 2018. The restitution was carried out by order of the Secretary of State for Tourism, Reyes Maroto, whose ministry had claimed ownership for decades.

In November 2022 two further portraits at Almagro were identified as having been plundered by a Francoist command after the Civil War. In the early years of the Franco dictatorship Claudio Sánchez-Albornoz (1893–1984), a historian, politician and Prime Minister and President of the Spanish Republican government in exile from 1959 to 1970, was forcibly deprived by the dictatorship authorities of Retrato de un Caballero and Retrato de una Dama by Felipe Diricksen (1590–1679). The former portrait is well known to Parador guests as it was displayed for over forty years in the ground floor corridor leading from the hotel's reception to the refectory banqueting hall and the bar-cafeteria. After being notified of the portraits' location by an art history teacher, Sánchez-Albornoz's son, Nicolás Sánchez-Albornoz (born 1926), sought their restitution.

Publicity of the discovery at the Parador de Almagro of the missing pictures led to calls for Paradores de Turismo to research the true ownership of all the pre-Civil War items in their approximately 10,000-piece artistic collection which is spread over their 98 establishments.
