= Rodrigo de Villandrando =

Rodrigo de Villandrando may refer to:

- Rodrigo de Villandrando (routier) (died c. 1457), Spanish routier (mercenary)
- Rodrigo de Villandrando (painter) (1588–1622), Spanish painter
