= Bartolomé González y Serrano =

Spanish painter

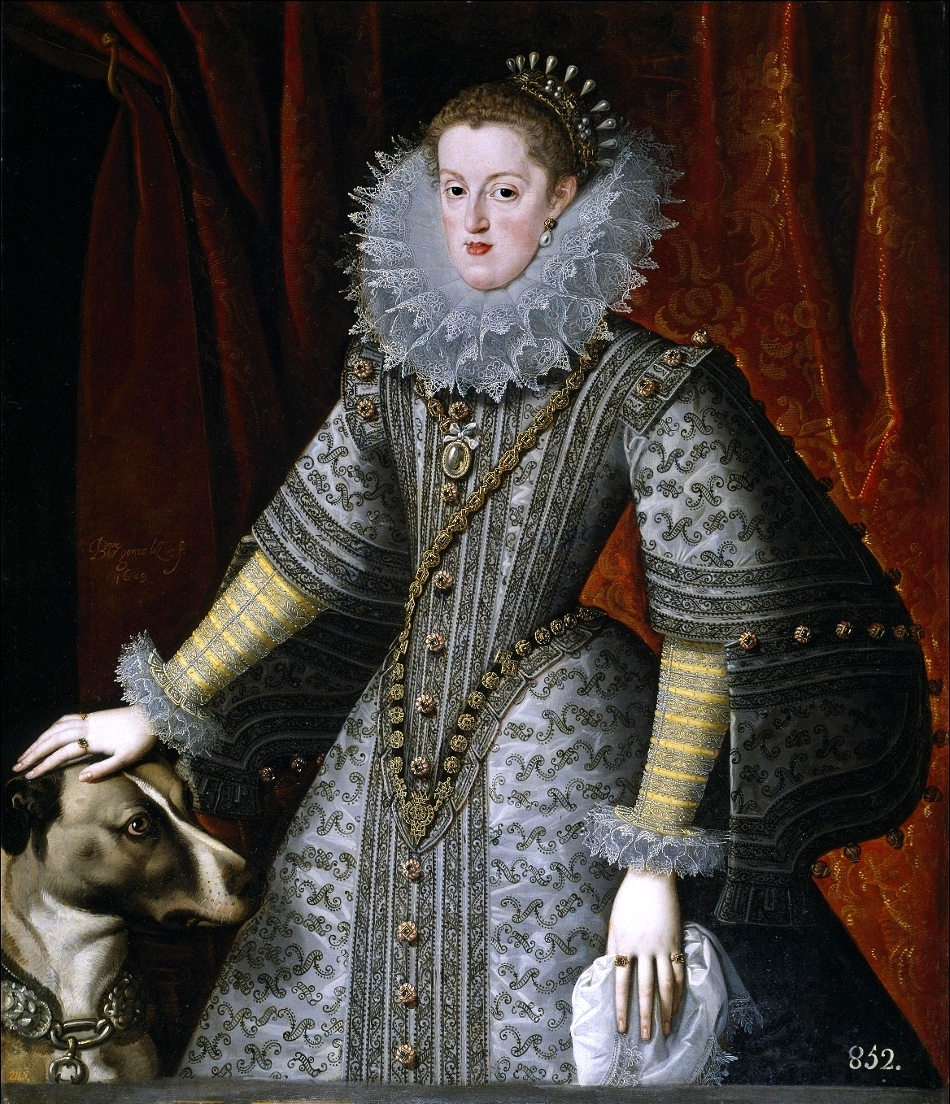
Margaret of Austria, Queen of Spain by Bartolomé González y Serrano, Museo del Prado, 1609

Bartolomé González y Serrano (1564–1627) was a Spanish Baroque painter specializing in portraits that represent a continuation of Renaissance court portrait types practiced by Alonso Sánchez Coello and especially by Juan Pantoja de la Cruz.

== Biography ==
González was born in Valladolid, and studied under Patricio Caxés and Juan Pantoja de la Cruz. He moved to Madrid, where he is documented from 1607, focusing on the execution of portraits for the Royal Court with Rodrigo de Villandrando and Andrés López Polanco. From 1617 he served as painter to King Philip III of Spain, occupying the place left vacant by Fabrizio Castello.

His work was almost exclusively dedicated to the production of portraits of the royal family, and were composed from various European courts, under the direction of Juan Pantoja de la Cruz. González focused on the minutely detailed embroidery, jewelry and other decorative pieces, leaving the faces, treated with chiaroscuro technique, as stiff and expressionless.

Until the death of Philip III, he painted ninety-one portraits of the royal family. Many were copies of other works. He also painted some religious themed works such as San Juan Bautista (Saint John the Baptist) (1621, Museum of Fine Arts in Budapest), or Rest on the Flight into Egypt (1627, Museo del Prado).

By his will, dated October 8, 1627, in which Felipe Diricksen signed as a witness, and the inventory of his possessions made on his death, a few days later, we know that he also painted still lifes and landscapes, in addition to numerous copies of paintings from the royal collection, both Italian artists (Titian and Raphael) and Spanish contemporaries, including Pedro Orrente, Blas de Prado and Vincenzo Carducci.
