= Torralba de Calatrava =

- Municipality
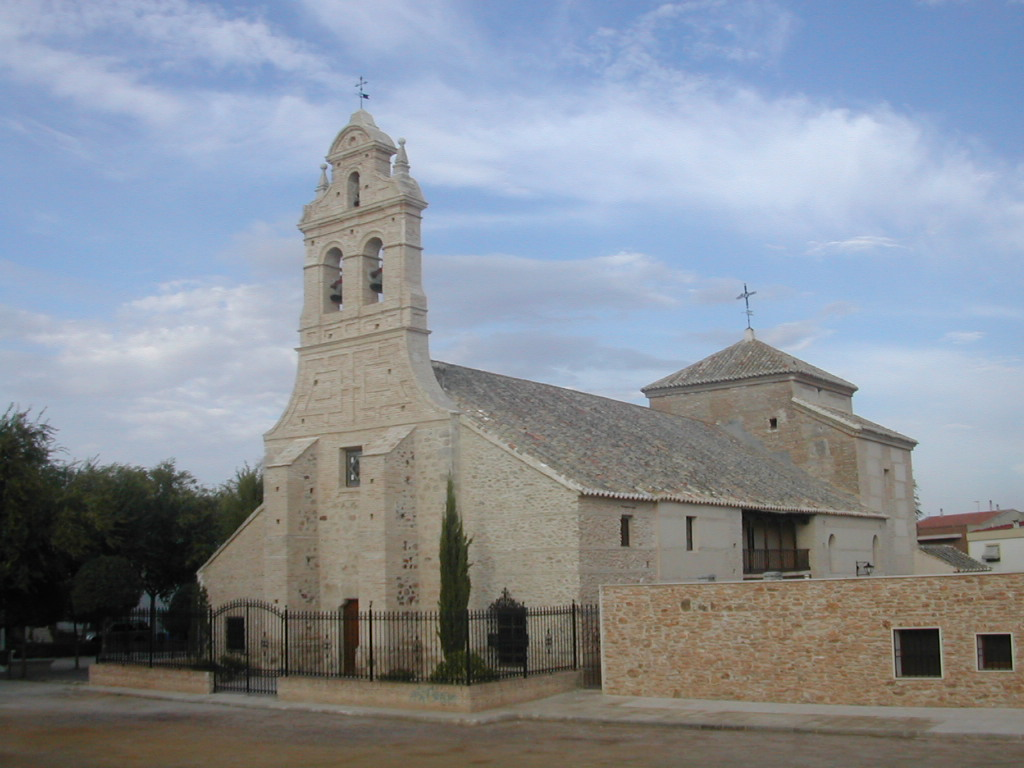
- Hermitage of the Holy Christ of Comfort, Patron Saint of Torralba de Calatrava

- Flag Coat of arms

- Location in Spain
- Coordinates: 39°00′59″N 3°45′00″W
- Country: Spain
- Autonomous community: Castile-La Mancha
- Province: Ciudad Real
- Comarca: Campo de Calatrava

Government
  - Alcaldesa: María Antonia Álvaro García-Villaraco (2019) (PP)

Area
  - Total: 101.58 km^{2} (39.22 sq mi)
- Elevation: 620 m (2,030 ft)

Population (2025-01-01)
  - Total: 3,068
  - Density: 30.20/km^{2} (78.22/sq mi)
- Demonym(s): torralbeño, -a
- Time zone: UTC+1 (CET)
  - Summer (DST): UTC+2 (CEST)
- Postal code: 13160
- Website: Official website

Torralba de Calatrava is a municipality located in province of Ciudad Real, Castile-La Mancha, Spain. It has a population of 2959 (2021) and located 17 km (11 mi) from the capital city. Some of the municipalities located close by are Carrión de Calatrava, Daimiel, Malagón and Bolaños de Calatrava.

This town is included in the Don Quixote route. It also lies within a volcanic zone (Cerrro de la Yezosa), which in turn also lies upon a quartzite massif.

== Monuments ==
- Patio de Comedias: Recently discovered and reconstructed. It takes part of the Festival de Teatro Clásico de Almagro. Remains of the old castle have appeared next to the hermitage of the Immaculate Conception. With a capacity for 740 people, this space is divided into four multipurpose areas, the largest of which is the main patio, with a capacity for 460 people seated. The ribbed arches belonging to the original structure of the Patio have been preserved, as well as the drawings or graffiti made with a punch and that appeared during the restoration. A cultural infrastructure of the first order for the municipality. The Patio de Comedias de Torralba de Calatrava is located between the walls of the old castle and one of the municipal granaries. There are documents that support that plays and puppet performances were held in here until the end of the 19th century, although the first data of theatrical activity dates back to the Renaissance, to the year 1578.
- Church of the Holy Trinity: Consecrated in 1541, a magnificent coffered ceiling made by Martín de Cuartas and a relief of the missing main altarpiece built at the beginning of the 17th century are preserved. Its interior, from the 16th century, has a single, wide nave.
- Hermitage of the Holy Christ of Comfort: Hermitage with a single nave, with a dome on the transept. There are three outstanding elements: the precious image of Christ, a silver lamp from the end of the 19th century, and the admirable Baroque belfry on the outside, built in brick and decorated with Tuscan pilasters, flamingos and crowned by a curved pediment(s . XVIII).
- Hermitage of the Immaculate Conception: Hermitage erected on the old fortress that gave rise to the municipality of Torralba. On the foundations of this castle the hermitage was built, which maintained the rank of parish until 1544. It has a single nave covered by a low ceiling, and its exterior stands out for its brick belfry.
- Bullring: Built on a private initiative by the businessman Don José Santa Cruz, this charming square has a good capacity and it is very well taken cared of.

== Festivities ==
- Holy Christ of Comfort from September 13 to 20. Festivities in honor of the patron saint of Torralba de Calatrava.
- Famous Carnival tradition.
- Easter: declared Regional Tourist Interest.
- Pilgrimages of San Isidro Labrador on May 15.
- Traditional festival of San Antonio, on June 13.
