= Almagro, Ciudad Real =

Almagro
- Municipality
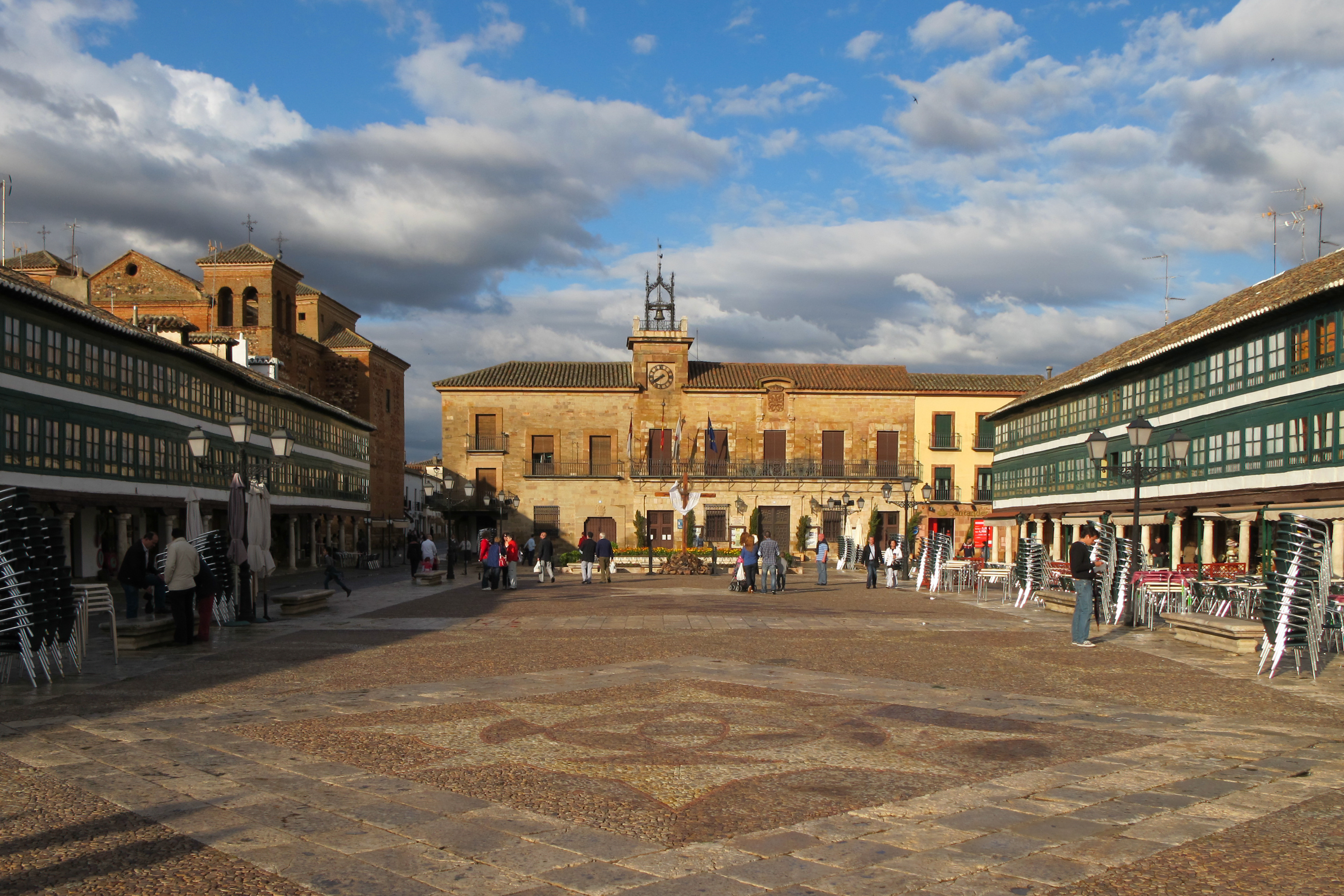
- Plaza Mayor

- Flag Coat of arms
- Interactive map of Almagro
- Coordinates: 38°53′16″N 3°42′44″W
- Country: Spain
- Autonomous community: Castile-La Mancha
- Province: Ciudad Real
- Comarca: Campo de Calatrava

Government
  - Alcalde: Daniel Reina (2019) (PSOE)

Area
  - Total: 249.73 km^{2} (96.42 sq mi)
- Elevation: 646 m (2,119 ft)

Population (2025-01-01)
  - Total: 9,190
  - Density: 36.8/km^{2} (95.3/sq mi)
- Demonym: Almagreño/ña
- Time zone: UTC+1 (CET)
  - Summer (DST): UTC+2 (CEST)
- Postal code: 13270
- Website: Official website

Spanish Cultural Heritage
- Type: Non-movable
- Criteria: Historic ensemble
- Designated: 13 July 1972
- Reference no.: RI-53-0000134

Almagro (Spanish pronunciation: [alˈmaɣɾo]) is a town and municipality situated in Ciudad Real province, in the autonomous community of Castile-La Mancha, Spain. A tourist destination, Almagro is designated a Conjunto histórico, a type of conservation area.

Almagro lies within small Paleozoic mountain ranges, with some reserves of shallow creeks, including the Pellejero and de Cuetos. It also lies within a volcanic zone (Cerro de la Yezosa), which lies upon a quartzite massif. It makes the zone particularly unique, together with that of the zones of Olot and Cabo de Gata, in the sense that it is one of the few important zones of volcanic origin in the Iberian Peninsula. An International Festival of Classical Theater has also been celebrated here annually since 1978.

== History ==
=== Roman and Islamic era ===
It is uncertain when humans first settled in the area of Almagro. There may have been a Bronze Age settlement; a theory supported by archaeological findings in the Casas Maestrales (complex of houses associated with the Order of Calatrava) and in spots outside of the town center. During the Roman era, it seems to have been inhabited, according to the scholar Galiano y Ortega, who argued that he saw the remains of an aqueduct, which were discovered during the construction of the present-day Paseo de la Estación. Roman coins have been found, as well as a headstone from this era, which can now be seen in the Town Hall; the headstone was discovered near the Roman bridge at Zuqueca, in Granátula. The name Almagro derives from the Arabic 'al-magra' (red clay) given by the Muslims who ruled Iberia for almost 800 years.

=== Visigothic era ===
Little remains of the Visigothic presence in the area except for some small columns decorated with beveled diamonds; the columns were dispersed by the local population.

=== Middle Ages ===
During the 13th century, Almagro declined due to the presence of competing cities in the area, Oretum (Granátula de Calatrava) and Calatrava la Vieja. However, Almagro was chosen by the Order of Calatrava as a place of residence during the same century. Almagro thus benefited from being the center of governance for this order.

A local tradition holds that a Master of the Order, Don Gonzalo Yánez, gave the town its charter in 1213, confirmed by Ferdinand III of Castile in 1222. In 1273, Alfonso X of Castile convoked the Castilian Cortes in Almagro and in 1285 Master of the Order Ruy Pérez Ponce worked out an agreement in 1285 over rights concerning the town's ovens, market place, and toll roads. In the fourteenth century, the town had a wall and a parish church, San Bartolomé el Real, butcher shops, granary, jailhouse, townhall, and a castle absorbed by the buildings owned by the Order of Calatrava.

The process of the Reconquista against the Muslims resulted in the gathering at Almagro of forces headed for the frontier. Pedro I of Castile arrested the Master of the Order, Juan Núñez de Prado, in 1354 at the Casas Maestrales.

In 1374, Henry II of Castile allowed the town to organize two fairs, which aided commerce. The General Chapters of the Order of Calatrava (Capítulos Generales de la Orden de Calatrava) also met in the town, in the chapel of San Benito de los Palacios Maestrales and in the church of Santa María de los Llanos, both of which no longer exist.

In the fifteenth century, the office of Master of the Order was incorporated into the Crown of Castile in 1487, but this did not harm the town. The Royal Governor now inhabited the Palaces formerly occupied by the Masters of the Order.

In 1493, Cardinal Cisneros ordered the construction of the Franciscan monastery of Santa María de los Llanos, annexed to the church of the same name, but this too has disappeared.

Due to the financial woes of Charles I of Spain, the German bankers of the Fugger family became beneficiaries of the mines at Almadén and Almagro. They brought with them to the town German administrators such as Wessel, Xedler, etc. Some of these Germans’ manor houses still survive.

=== Sixteenth and seventeenth centuries ===
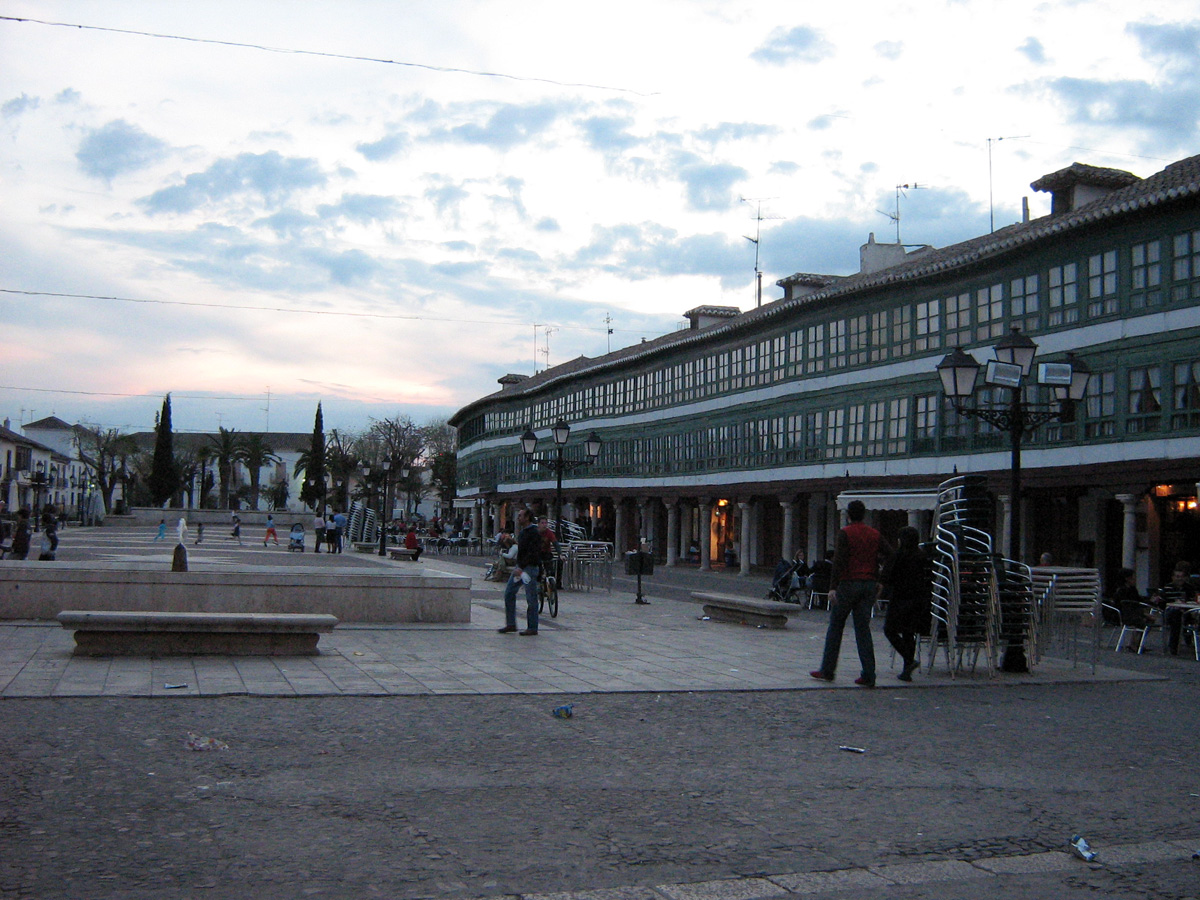
Main square of Almagro

The population grew during the 16th and 17th centuries, and the population expanded beyond the town walls, with the suburbs of San Pedro, Santiago, San Ildefonso, San Juan, San Sebastián, and San Lázaro being established during this time. The Claverian Fernando Fernández de Córdoba founded the monastery and educational institution of Nuestra Señora del Rosario. The knight commander don Gutierre de Padilla founded the Hospital de la Misericordia and the monastery of Asunción de Calatrava. The parish church of Madre de Dios, the convent of La Encarnación, business offices for the Fuggers, and a large number of manor houses were built during this time. Rebuilt during this time were the church of San Blas, the Main Square (Plaza), and the Town Hall. The crisis affecting Spain during the late 16th and early 17th centuries did not affect construction in Almagro; the Franciscans built during this time the Convent of Santa Catalina. The Augustinians, Jesuits, and Hospitalers established themselves here, and the followers of Juan Francisco Gaona y Portocarrero, Conde de Valdeparaíso, built his palace here.

Almagro flourished due to the patronage both of Philip V of Spain and of Juan Francisco Gaona y Portocarrero, Conde de Valdeparaíso, who served in Philip's government as head of the Exchequer.

The town was named provincial capital of La Mancha, a position it enjoyed from 1750 to 1761. The Conde de Valdeparaíso, unsuccessful in his attempts to permanently make Almagro an administrative center, promoted commerce, especially in textiles, encouraging the trade in appliqué lace and pillow lace (encaje de bolillos).

The sale of church lands under Charles III of Spain jeopardized the future of many church buildings in Almagro, and the university disappeared by the 19th century. The Order of Calatrava moved from the uncomfortable location of Castillo de Calatrava la Nueva to the Sacro Convento in Almagro proper, but did not remain permanently.

=== Nineteenth century ===
During the Peninsular War, an active Bonapartist masonic lodge was established in Almagro. The town suffered during the Carlist Wars and the sale of church lands by Juan Álvarez Mendizábal and Pascual Madoz. During the 19th century, the town faced competition from Ciudad Real and Bolaños de Calatrava. Almagro built a Plaza de Toros (1845) from materials originally from the stone tower of the ancient parish church of San Bartolomé, which had been demolished in 1845. The bullfighter Cagancho would later compete in this stadium, and on one occasion, would certainly make an impression with an exceptionally dreadful performance, giving rise to the expression "quedar como Cagancho en Almagro" (literally "to end up like Cagancho in Almagro"), which means "to suffer a great failure publicly".

The telegraph (1858), railway (1860), and electricity (1897) were introduced during this time. A general headquarters for the cavalry (1863) was established, as were a casino, coliseum, and theater (1864). In 1886, the town walls and gates were demolished.

=== Twentieth century ===
During the 1950s, the Corral de Comedias was discovered and restored. The Town Hall and Plaza Mayor were also restored. In 1972, Almagro was declared a Historical-Artistic Zone (Conjunto Histórico-Artístico). Numerous buildings were restored, including churches, palaces, houses, and hermitages. The National Museum of Theatre was established in a spot near orchards and wine cellars; a special building was later built for it. Almagro became a center for the dramatic arts in the region, and the International Festival of Classical Theater (Festival Internacional de Teatro Clásico) was put on here. Almagro is a candidate for becoming World Heritage Site.

== Climate ==
Almagro has a cold semi-arid climate (Köppen climate classification: BSk) that is characterized by cool, sometimes cold winters and very hot summers. As in several regions of the Meseta Central, average annual precipitation is low and generally irregular, with summer often being the driest season. It has one of the highest annual temperature ranges in the Iberian Peninsula, exceeding 21 °C (70 °F) and it is not uncommon to record temperatures below −5 °C (23 °F) and above 40 °C (104 °F) in the same year.

Climate data for Almagro (2004-2025), extremes (2003-present)
Month	Jan	Feb	Mar	Apr	May	Jun	Jul	Aug	Sep	Oct	Nov	Dec	Year
Record high °C (°F)	20.3 (68.5)	24.8 (76.6)	29.2 (84.6)	35.4 (95.7)	39.5 (103.1)	42.6 (108.7)	44.2 (111.6)	43.8 (110.8)	40.6 (105.1)	33.9 (93.0)	26.0 (78.8)	20.2 (68.4)	44.2 (111.6)
Mean daily maximum °C (°F)	11.4 (52.5)	13.9 (57.0)	16.8 (62.2)	20.4 (68.7)	25.6 (78.1)	31.6 (88.9)	36.0 (96.8)	35.3 (95.5)	29.1 (84.4)	23.4 (74.1)	15.7 (60.3)	11.8 (53.2)	22.6 (72.6)
Daily mean °C (°F)	5.8 (42.4)	7.5 (45.5)	10.2 (50.4)	13.5 (56.3)	18.0 (64.4)	23.5 (74.3)	27.2 (81.0)	26.7 (80.1)	21.5 (70.7)	16.4 (61.5)	9.9 (49.8)	6.5 (43.7)	15.6 (60.0)
Mean daily minimum °C (°F)	0.3 (32.5)	1.1 (34.0)	3.6 (38.5)	6.6 (43.9)	10.3 (50.5)	15.3 (59.5)	18.3 (64.9)	18.1 (64.6)	13.9 (57.0)	9.5 (49.1)	4.1 (39.4)	1.2 (34.2)	8.5 (47.3)
Record low °C (°F)	−11.9 (10.6)	−8.0 (17.6)	−7.4 (18.7)	−3.0 (26.6)	1.0 (33.8)	7.2 (45.0)	9.4 (48.9)	6.6 (43.9)	3.2 (37.8)	−1.4 (29.5)	−7.3 (18.9)	−8.2 (17.2)	−11.9 (10.6)
Average precipitation mm (inches)	27.7 (1.09)	29.6 (1.17)	47.1 (1.85)	49.9 (1.96)	29.6 (1.17)	16.0 (0.63)	2.1 (0.08)	7.5 (0.30)	27.6 (1.09)	49.3 (1.94)	40.1 (1.58)	39.9 (1.57)	366.4 (14.43)
Source: Agencia Estatal de Meteorología (AEMET OpenData)

== Economy ==
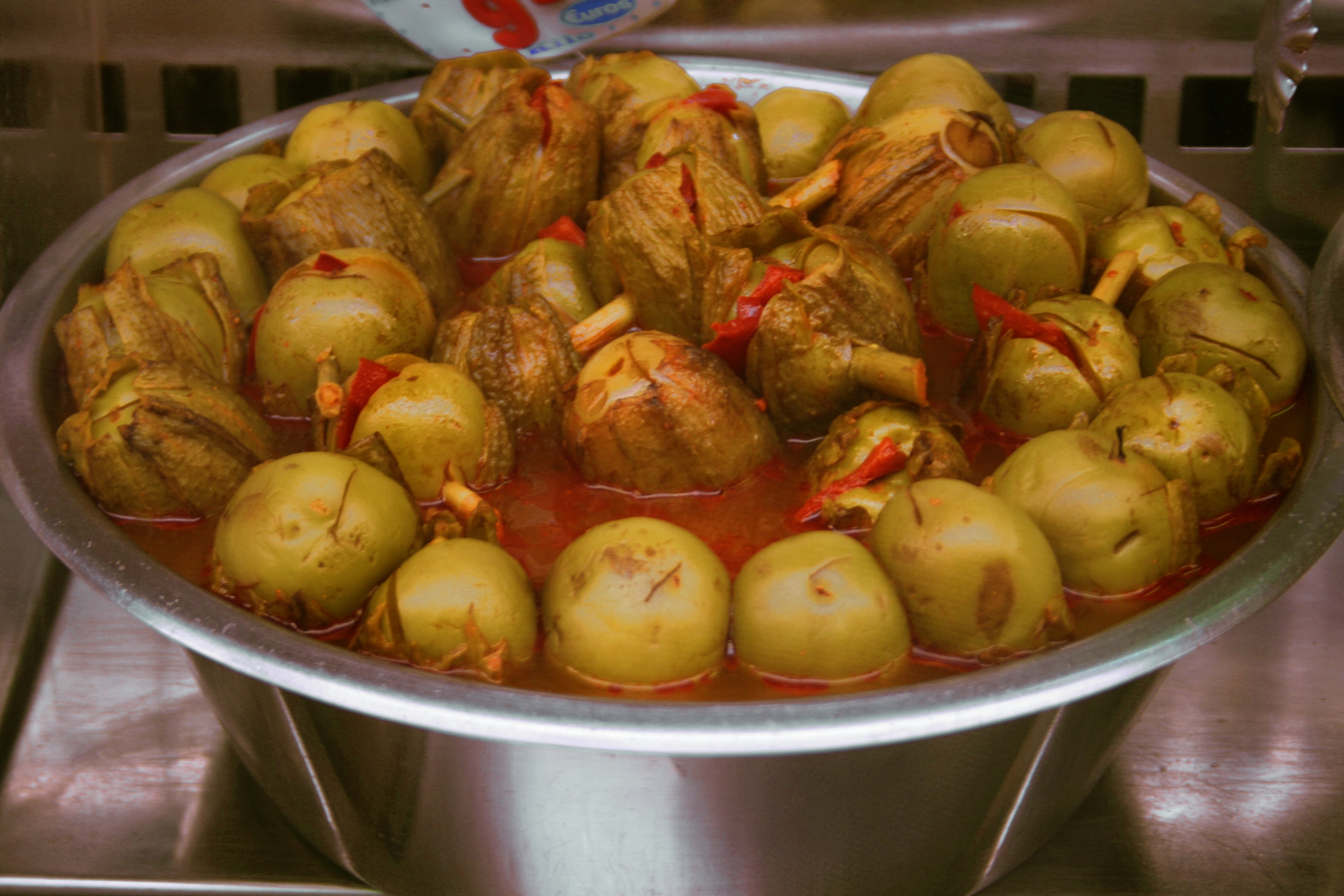
Almagro eggplants

Cereal, vines, olives, and cotton are grown and cultivated here; there are also livestock and herding. There are also quarries of basalt and mines of manganese and plaster. A traditional industry is the fashioning of appliqué lace and pillow lace (encaje de bolillos), crafted by the encajeras. Other industries include woodworking and construction.

Almagro is also famous for a variety of small aubergines, berenjenas de Almagro, seasoned and pickled according to a traditional recipe. These are usually eaten as a snack, along with other tapas, such as banderillas.

An International Festival of Classical Theater has also been celebrated here annually since 1978.

== Natives of Almagro ==
- Diego de Almagro, conquistador
- Conde de Valdeparaíso, nobleman
- Juan Frederic Geldre, writer
- Fray Antonio de Lorea, writer
- Vicente and Francisco Rujero, Carlist guerrillas known as "los Palillos"
- Federico Galiano y Ortega, historian

== Local monuments and sights ==
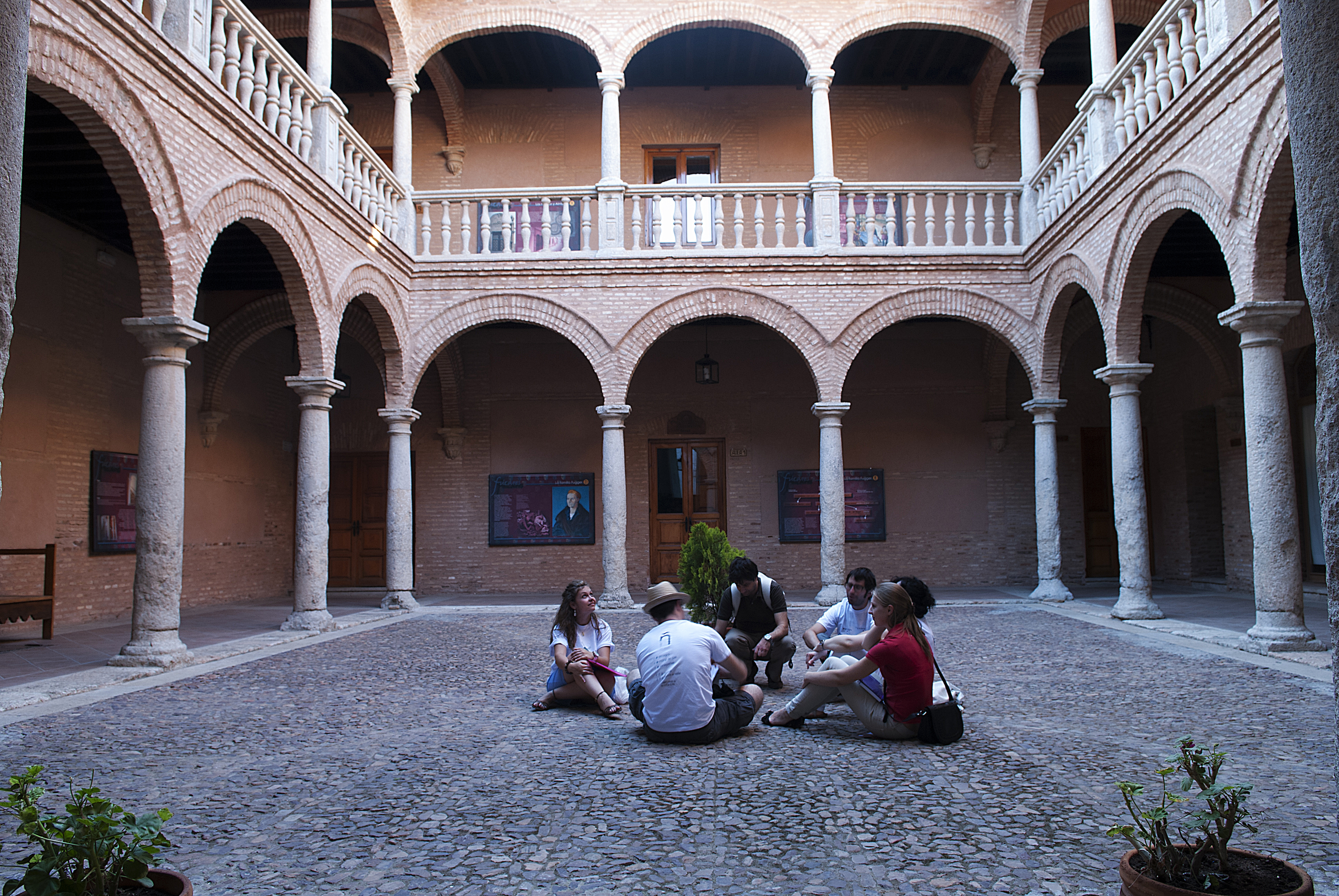
Almagro is member of the cultural programme Ruta Ñ to promote the Spanish language and culture. Photo: Students of Spanish in the "Palacio de los Fúcares" (Almagro).

- Plaza Mayor
- Manor houses
- Corral de Comedias
- Palaces:
  - Palacio de los Marqueses de Torremejía
  - Palacio de los Condes de Valdeparaíso
  - Palacio de los Medrano
  - Palacio de los Fúcares is a misnomer; it is actually an ancient warehouse built by the Fugger Family (Fúcares).

=== Museums ===
- National Museum of Theatre
- Museo Etnográfico Campo de Calatrava

== Churches and convents ==
- Convento del Santísimo Sacramento
- Iglesia de la Madre de Dios
- Convento de Santa Catalina
- Convento de la Encarnación
- Convento de la Asunción de Calatrava
- Iglesia de San Bartolomé
