= Juan Francisco Ruiz de Gaona y Portocarrero, Conde de Valdeparaíso =

Spanish politician

Juan Francisco Ruiz de Gaona y Portocarrero (Almagro, 13 February 1696 - Madrid, 4 February 1760), second Count of Valdeparaíso (Condado de Valdeparaíso) was a Spanish politician of the 18th century.

== Career ==
He served as Minister of the Exchequer under Ferdinand VI of Spain, and under his patronage, the city of Almagro, Ciudad Real became capital of the intendencia (province) of La Mancha from 1750 to 1761. He also acquired a Baroque palace in Almagro, which was later restored by the Provincial Deputation of Ciudad Real in 1992.

== Personal life ==
His father was Juan de Gaona y Abad, who was named Count of Valdeparaíso in 1705. A knight of the Order of Calatrava, he married in 1734 with María Arias de Porres, Marquesa of Añavate.
