= National Museum of Theatre =

Theatre museum in Almagro, Spain

Coordinates: 38.8889°N 3.7130°W

- Museo Nacional del Teatro
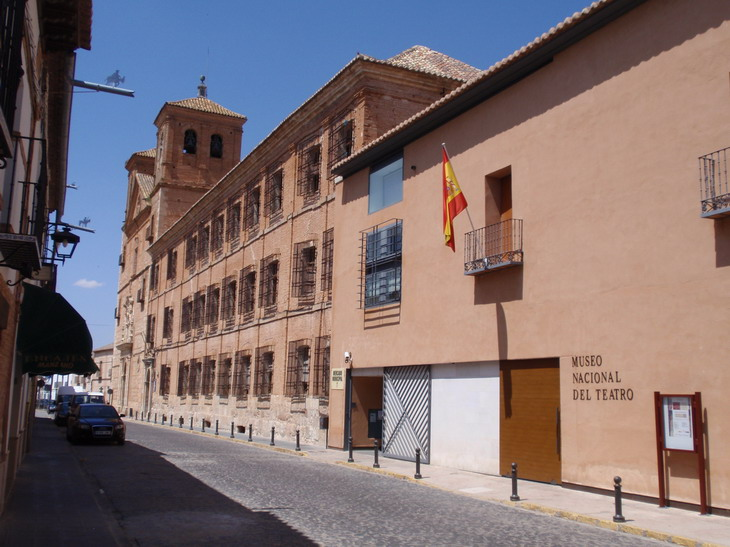
- Former name: Museo-Archivo Teatral
- Established: November 1919
- Location: Almagro (Ciudad Real), Spain
- Type: Theatre museum
- Website: http://museoteatro.mcu.es/

The National Museum of Theatre (Spanish: Museo Nacional del Teatro) is a museum in Almagro (Ciudad Real), Spain, devoted to the promotion and preservation of Spanish theatre. It owns a large collection of scenic designs and scale models, costumes and costume designs, puppets, drawings, printmakings, paintings, sculptures, photographs, music recordings, programmes and documents from diverse Spanish theatres. It is one of the National Museums of Spain and it is attached to the Instituto Nacional de las Artes Escénicas y de la Música.

== Gallery ==
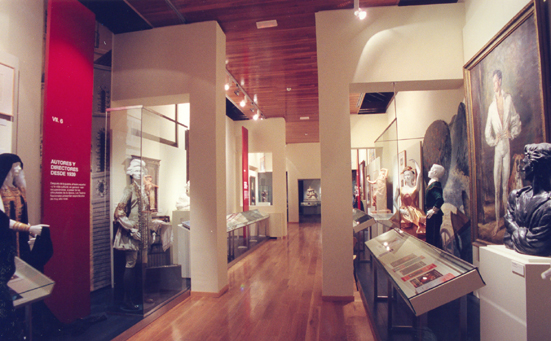
Exhibition Room

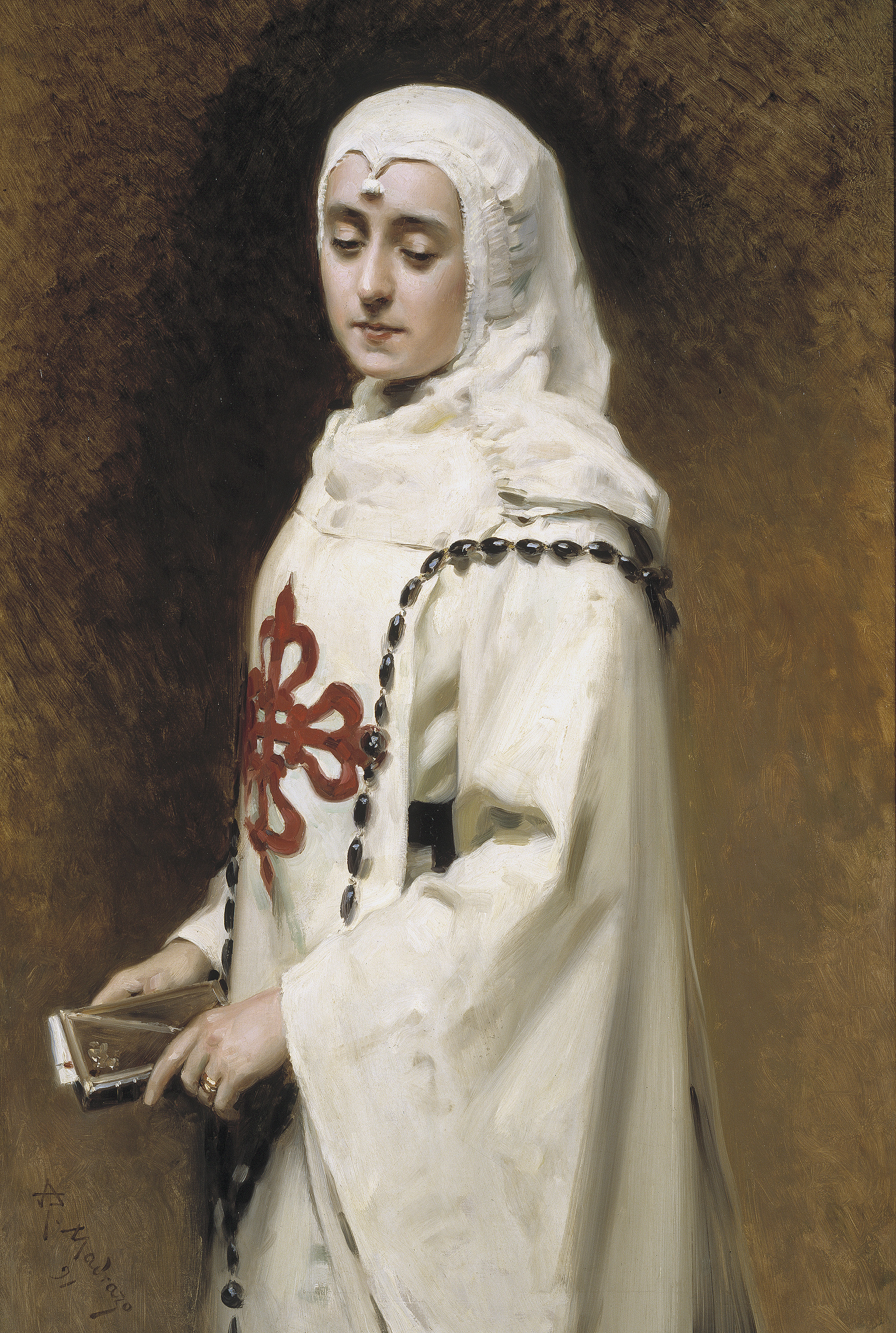
María Guerrero as Doña Inés in Don Juan Tenorio. Raimundo de Madrazo y Garreta 1891.

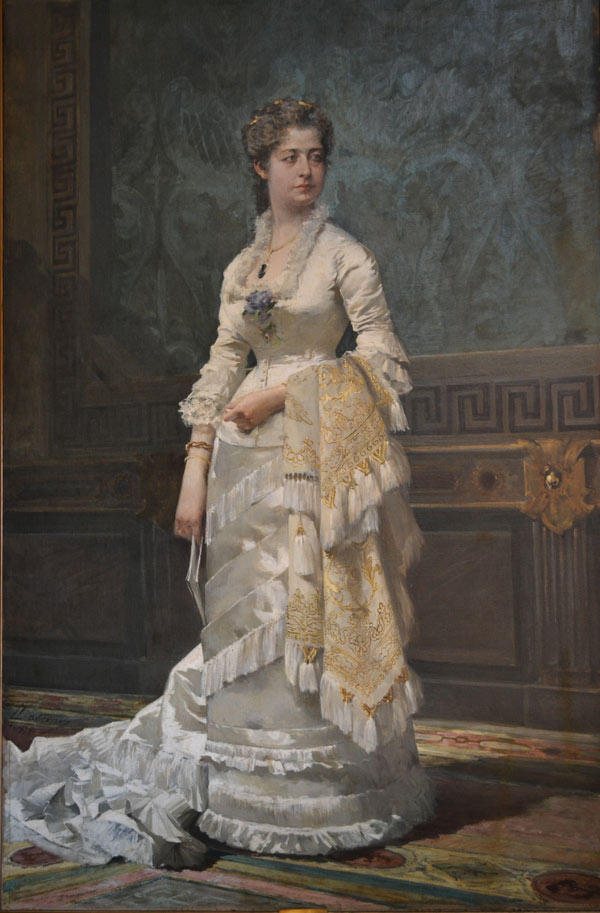
María Tubau as La Dame aux Camélias. Luis Taberner y Montalvo 1878.
