= Iglesia de la Madre de Dios =

Coordinates: 38.88944°N 3.70954°W

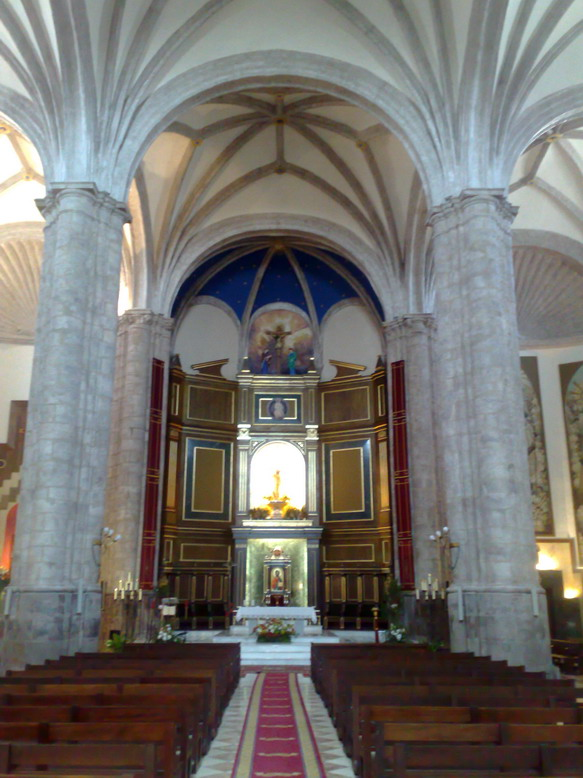
Interior of the Iglesia de la Madre de Dios

Iglesia de la Madre de Dios is a Roman Catholic church located in Almagro, Spain. It is situated in what was the Hospital de Nuestra Señora de La Mayor, on lots purchased by the town in 1546. It features late Gothic and Renaissance styles, a pattern found in other parts of Castile-La Mancha as well. It is the largest church in the province, surpassing even the Cathedral of Ciudad Real. The facade, with large buttresses, has a large rose window of brick dated 1602. The tower, built unfinished on the right side of the facade, is the work of Benito de Soto.
