= Arenales de San Gregorio =

- Municipality
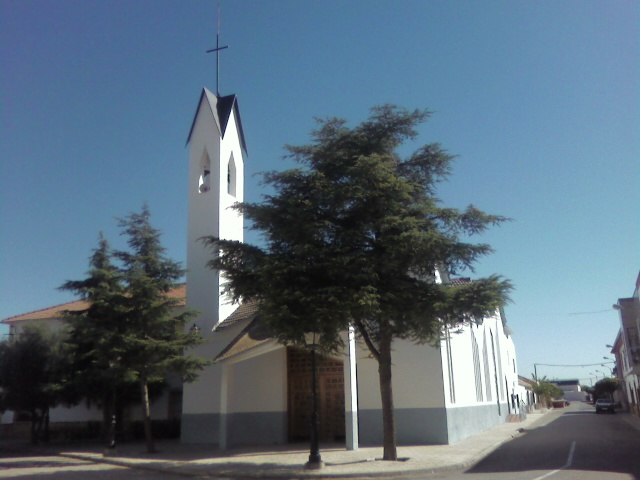

- Flag Coat of arms

- Location in Spain
- Coordinates: 39°18′35″N 3°01′32″W
- Country: Spain
- Autonomous community: Castile-La Mancha
- Province: Ciudad Real
- Comarca: Mancha Alta
- Judicial district: Alcázar de San Juan

Government
  - Mayor: Ángel Ortiz Jiménez

Area
  - Total: 31.19 km^{2} (12.04 sq mi)
- Elevation: 660 m (2,170 ft)

Population (2025-01-01)
  - Total: 626
  - Density: 20.1/km^{2} (52.0/sq mi)
- Demonym: Arenaleros
- Time zone: UTC+1 (CET)
  - Summer (DST): UTC+2 (CEST)
- Postal code: 13619
- Official language(s): Catalan, Spanish
- Website: Official website

Arenales de San Gregorio is a municipality in the province of Ciudad Real, Castile-La Mancha, Spain. It has a population of 703.

Economy is mostly based on agriculture, with cultivation of vine and olives.

== Economy ==
The village economy is mainly based on the primary sector. The cultivation of vineyards and olive are very importants, and the most important of all is the melon cultivation.

The village has also a cooperative, bars and a rural hotel.
