= Bolaños de Calatrava =

- Municipality
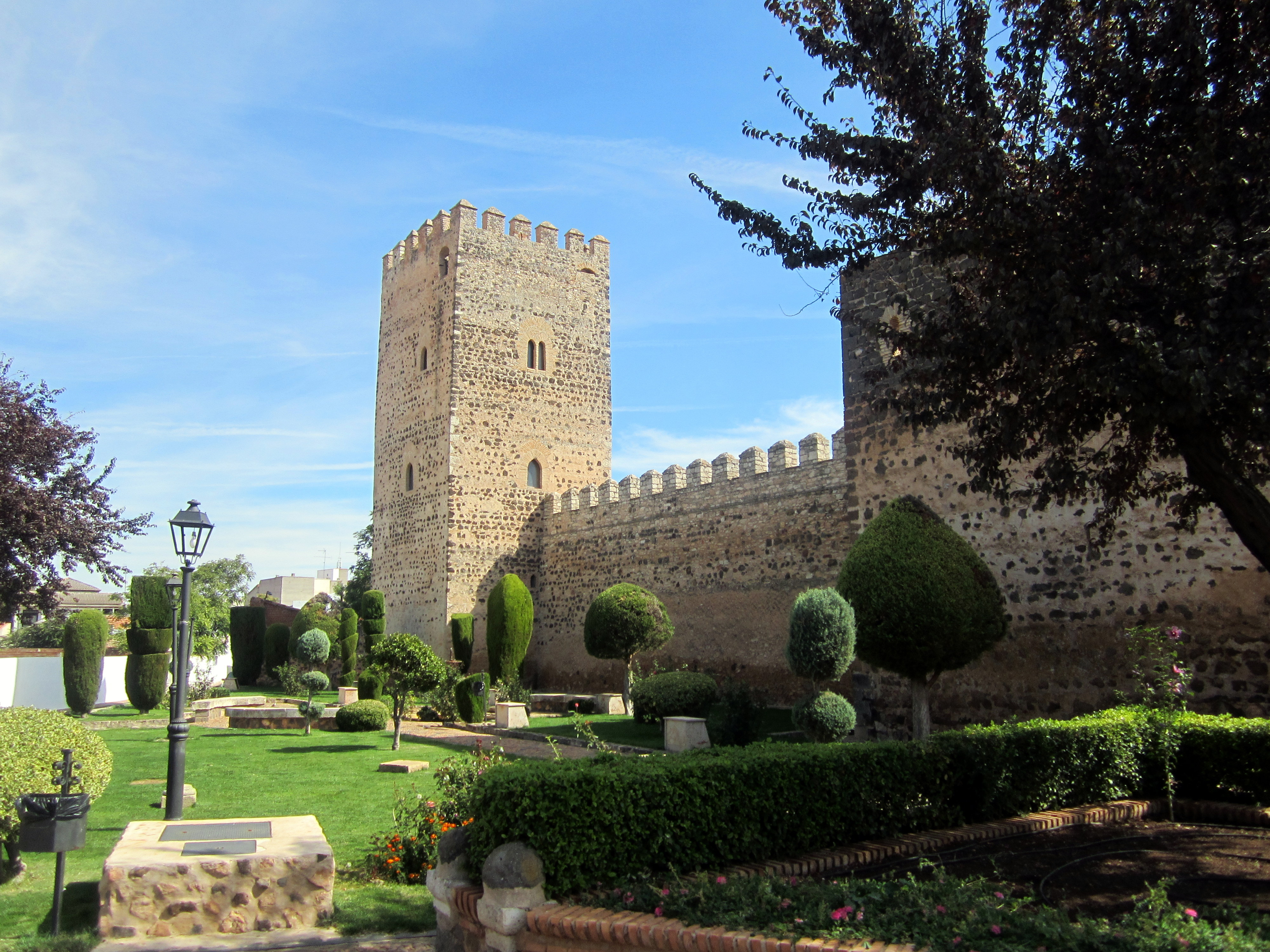
- Doña Berenguela Castle

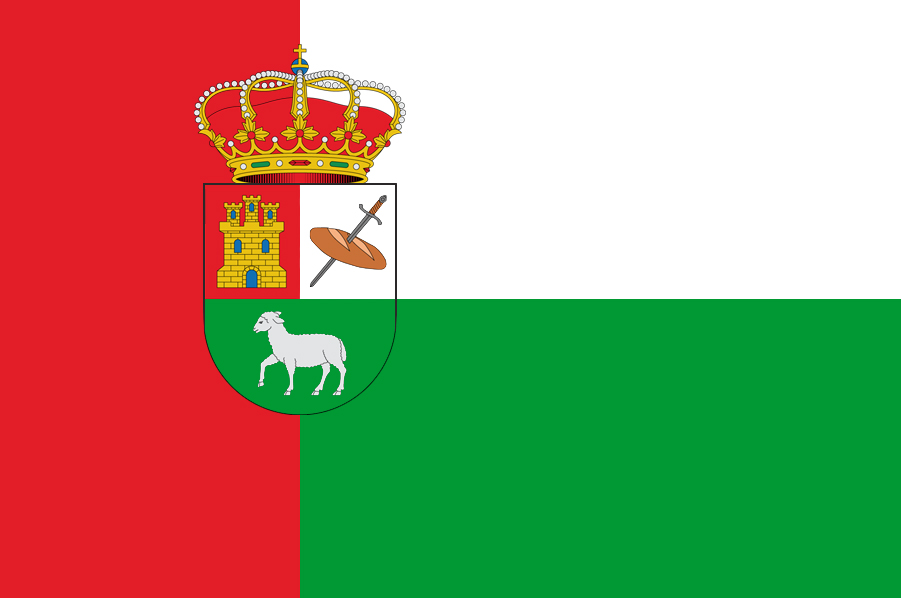
- Flag Coat of arms

- Location in Spain Bolaños de Calatrava (Spain)
- Coordinates: 38°52′59″N 3°43′0″W
- Country: Spain
- Autonomous community: Castile-La Mancha
- Province: Ciudad Real
- Comarca: Campo de Calatrava

Government
  - Alcalde: Miguel Ángel Valverde (2023) (Partido Popular)

Area
  - Total: 249.73 km^{2} (96.42 sq mi)
- Elevation: 646 m (2,119 ft)

Population (2025-01-01)
  - Total: 12,153
  - Density: 48.665/km^{2} (126.04/sq mi)
- Demonym: Bolañego/a
- Time zone: UTC+1 (CET)
  - Summer (DST): UTC+2 (CEST)
- Postal code: 13260
- Website: Official website

Bolaños de Calatrava is a city situated in the Ciudad Real province in the autonomous community of Castile-La Mancha, Spain. It is 4 kilometers from Almagro.

== History ==
The first settlement dates back to Roman times. The area became a strategic point for trade and communication, linking Toledo with Córdoba and Mérida with the Mediterranean Sea. Bolaños Castle was built to provide housing and protection on the road from Toledo to Córdoba.

Possession of the city was contested by the Taifa of Córdoba, the Taifa of Seville and the Taifa of Toledo, after the fragmentation of Al-Andalus.

During the Reconquista, the region was in a constant state of siege and battle. With the Christian victory at Las Navas de Tolosa (1212), the area began to repopulate.

The city's villa was owned by Berenguela of Castile. In 1229, she donated the village to the Order of Calatrava. This grant was confirmed by Fernando III el Santo and later by Alfonso X el Sabio.

Bolaños had large Islamic and Jewish populations until the expulsion of members of these religions in 1492, at which point many of them converted to Christianity.

== Geography ==
The city lies within small Paleozoic mountain ranges, surrounded by shallow creeks, including the Pellejero and de Cuetos. It also lies within a volcanic zone (la Yezosa), which lies upon a quartzite sierra, similar to the zones of Olot and Cabo de Gata in the Iberian Peninsula.

== Events ==
=== Holy Week ===
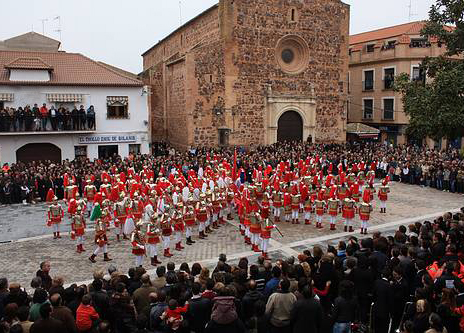
"The Star" in the Spanish Square at Holy Week

Campo de Calatrava attracts many regional tourists for its odd representation of Holy Week. One of the principal attractions is the marching company of 'Roman soldiers' popularly known as los armaos (the armed ones). A further attraction are religious floats influenced by Andalusian iconography along with church guilds such as Our Lady of Solitude and Jesus of Nazareth. The 'Roman soldiers' belong to the guild of Holy Christ of the Sepulchre as exemplified by works of local artist José Castellanos Borondo. The highlights of the Calatrava Holy Week are the representations of "The Arrest" (of Christ), "The Fall" and the colorful parades of los armaos notable for its sobriety as they silently start the procession from under the porch of San Felipe and Santiago Church.

=== Our Lady of Mount Pilgrimage ===
This pilgrimage is the longest established tradition in town, sharing its local bolañegos spirit with outsiders and visitors. The event is celebrated on the last Sunday of April, in the former "Meadow of the Moheda" which dates to the time of the military orders of Calatrava. Eight years ago, a chapel was built in the side of a small ridge, in the foothills of Sierra Pelada, to house the image of the Virgin for neighboring towns and villages of Almagro under the ecclesiastical jurisdiction of Moral de Calatrava and Bolaños de Calatrava. Currently, the site is in a small village that grew around the first chapel of Our Lady of the Mount.

Since ancient times, inhabitants of the region, especially bolañegos, visited the chapel with family and friends, including the consumption of the traditional manchego stew. Today, the duration of the festival extends beyond one day and attracts people from all parts of Spain to celebrate their devotion to the Virgin, as well as to participate in the city's revelry.

Of particular interest to visitors is the image of the Virgin wearing an amusing hat, decoration of the chapel with flowers, the hanging of notes on the mantle during the Sunday procession, and the auction of "State Authority" (a gold medal) at the shrine gates once the pilgrimage is complete. The ceremonies have sometimes generated controversy amongst the clergy and bolañega society.

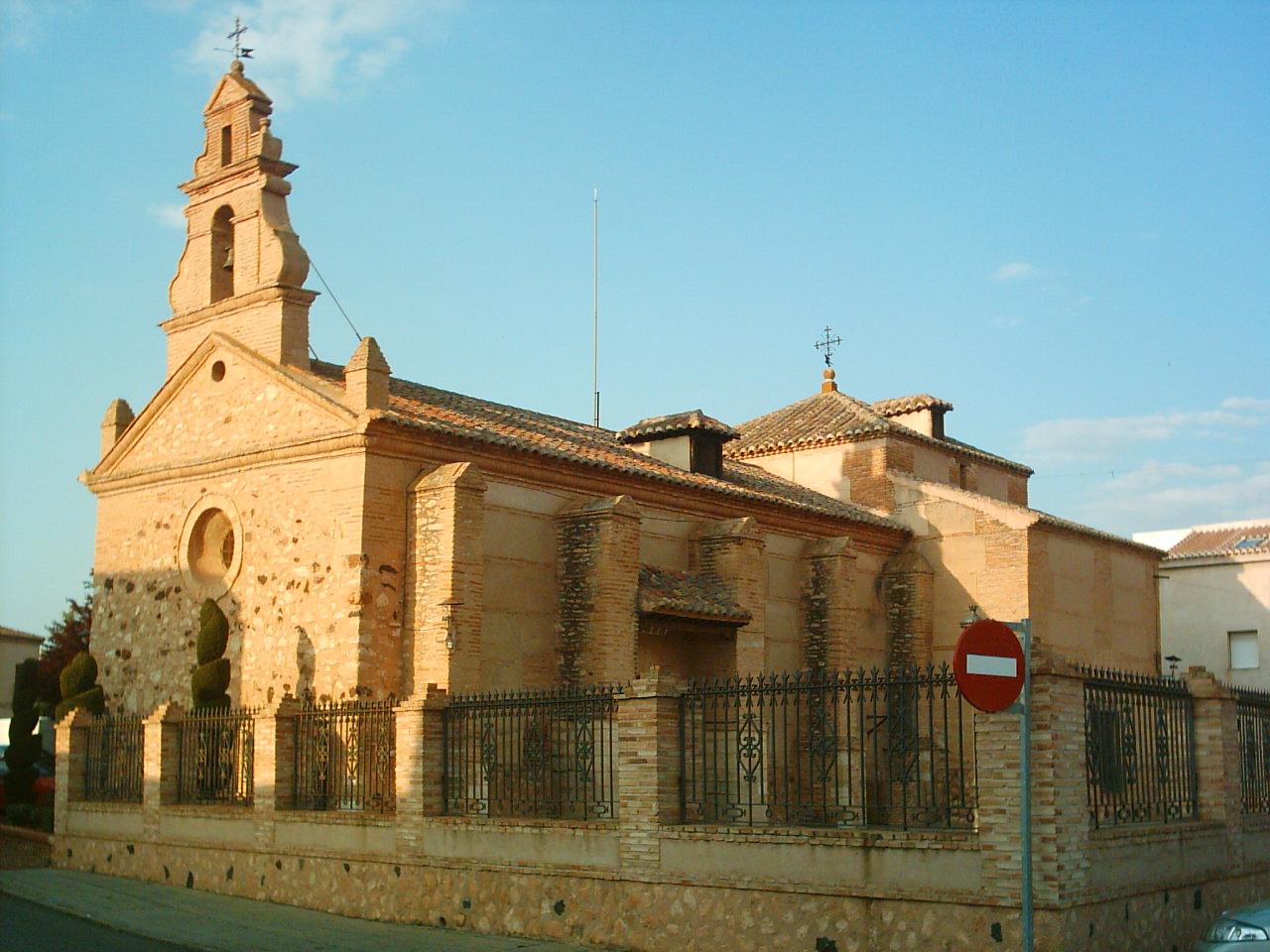
Cristo de la Columna Church

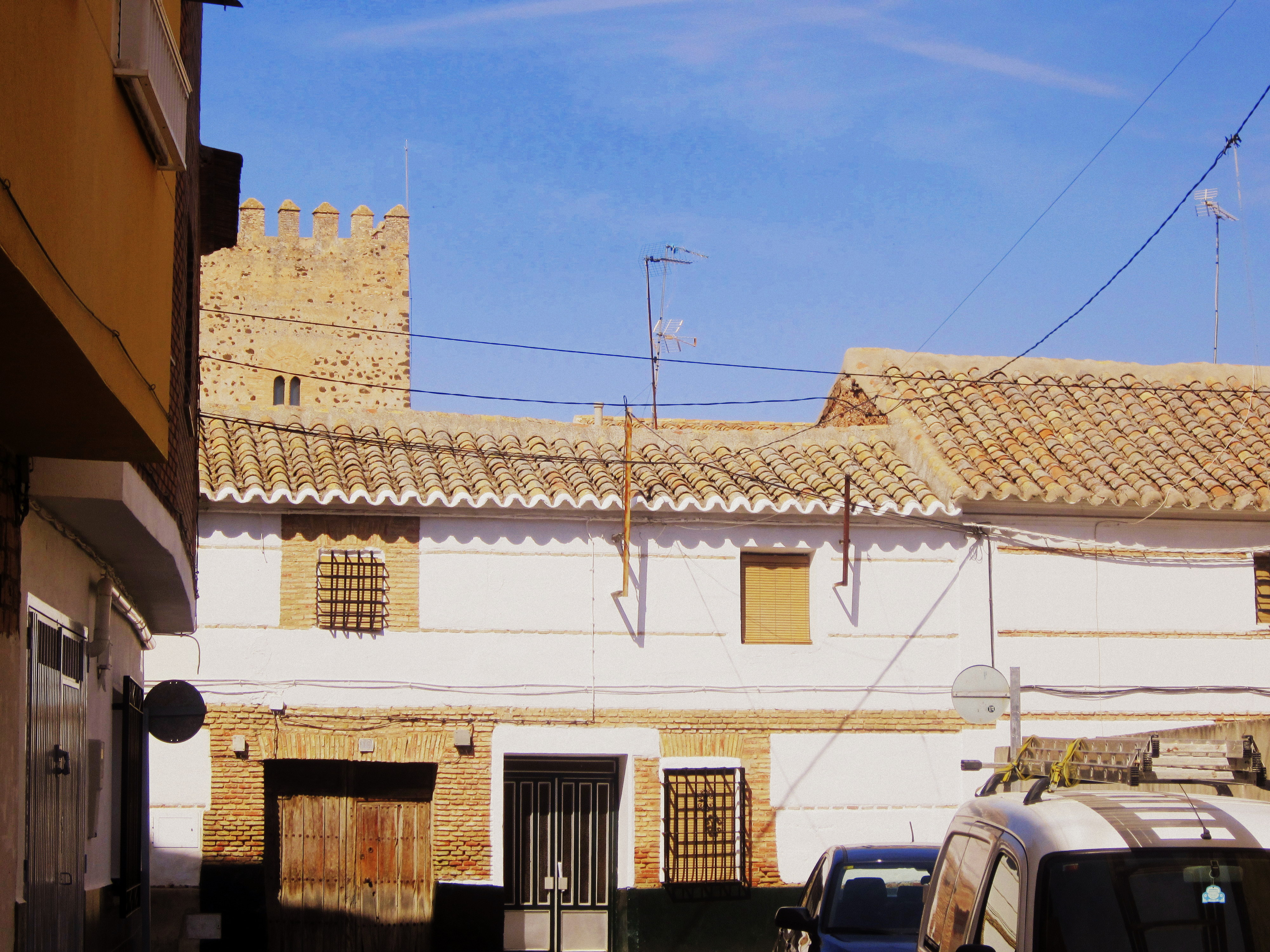
Castle tower from Arzobispo Calzado Street

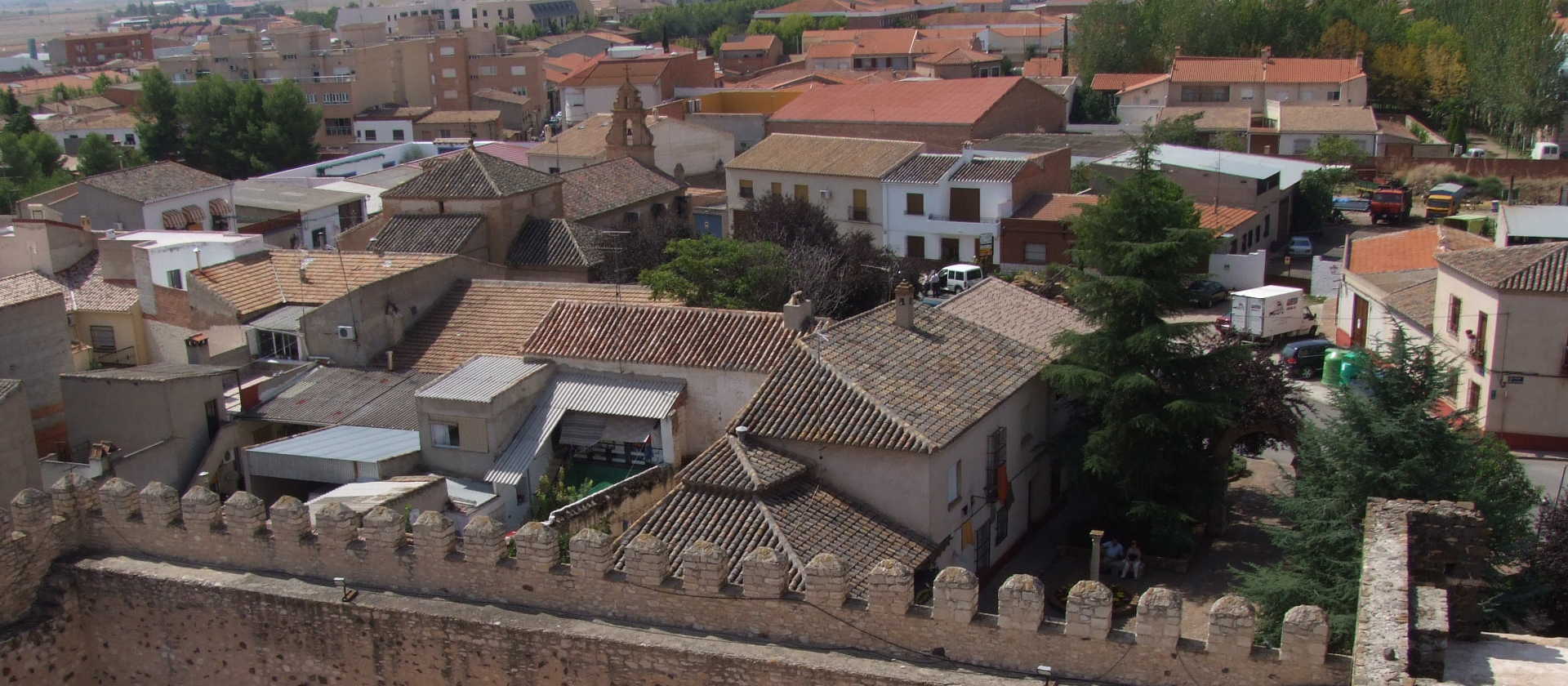
Panoramic
