= Felipe Diricksen =

Spanish painter

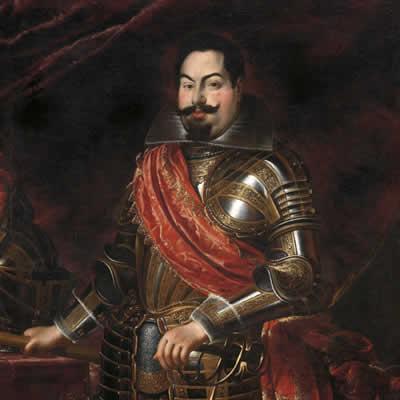
Portrait of Gómez Suárez de Figueroa, 3rd Duke of Feria (detail) by Felipe Diricksen, Casa Ducal de Medinaceli, 1635

Felipe Diricksen, also Diriksen or Deriksen, (1590-1679), was a Spanish Baroque painter primarily of portraits and religious paintings, and a member of a family of Flemish painters.

== Early life ==
Diricksen was born and baptized in San Lorenzo de El Escorial in 1590. He was grandson of Anton van den Wyngaerde, called in Spain Antonio de las Viñas, and son of the painter of Rodrigo Diricksen. He grew up in Oudenburg but settled in Spain while still in childhood. At twenty he married Ana Oliver y Bobadilla, whose dowry included land and a residence. In 1612 he entered the service of King Philip III of Spain as an official court painter. In 1620 he painted a portrait of King Philip III in Lisbon depicting the swearing in ceremony with a view of the city in the distance.

Few details follow about his life, almost all refer to his continued status as official court painter, which remained in effect until 1639, and even up to 1678 he was still designated as "on reserve". In his will he claimed to have been the father of eight children, one of whom, Gabriel, also took up painting. The absence of news for the last thirty years of his life can be filled, in part, from the will of 1676 and the inventory of his works. Religious painting must have been his main occupation in those final years, citing those documents, without further specification, many paintings made for Don Jeronimo de Mascarene and the Order of Saint Benedict, together, perhaps, with teaching the craft.

== Gallery ==
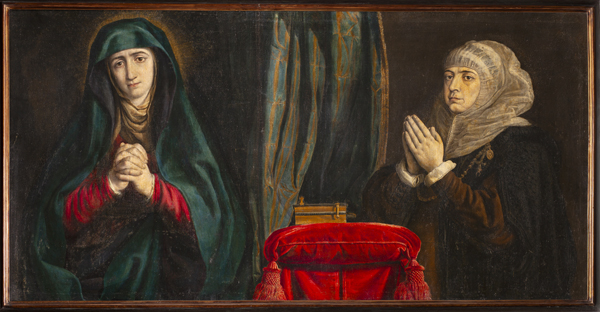
Portrait of María Gasca de la Vega
c.1625, Pastrana, Spain

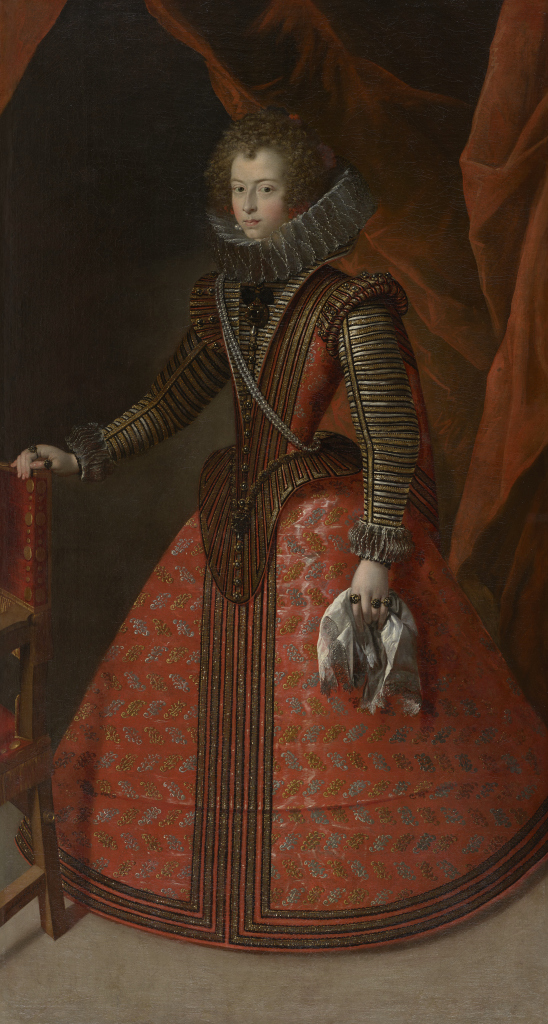
Portrait of Infanta María Ana de Austria
1630, Portland Art Museum

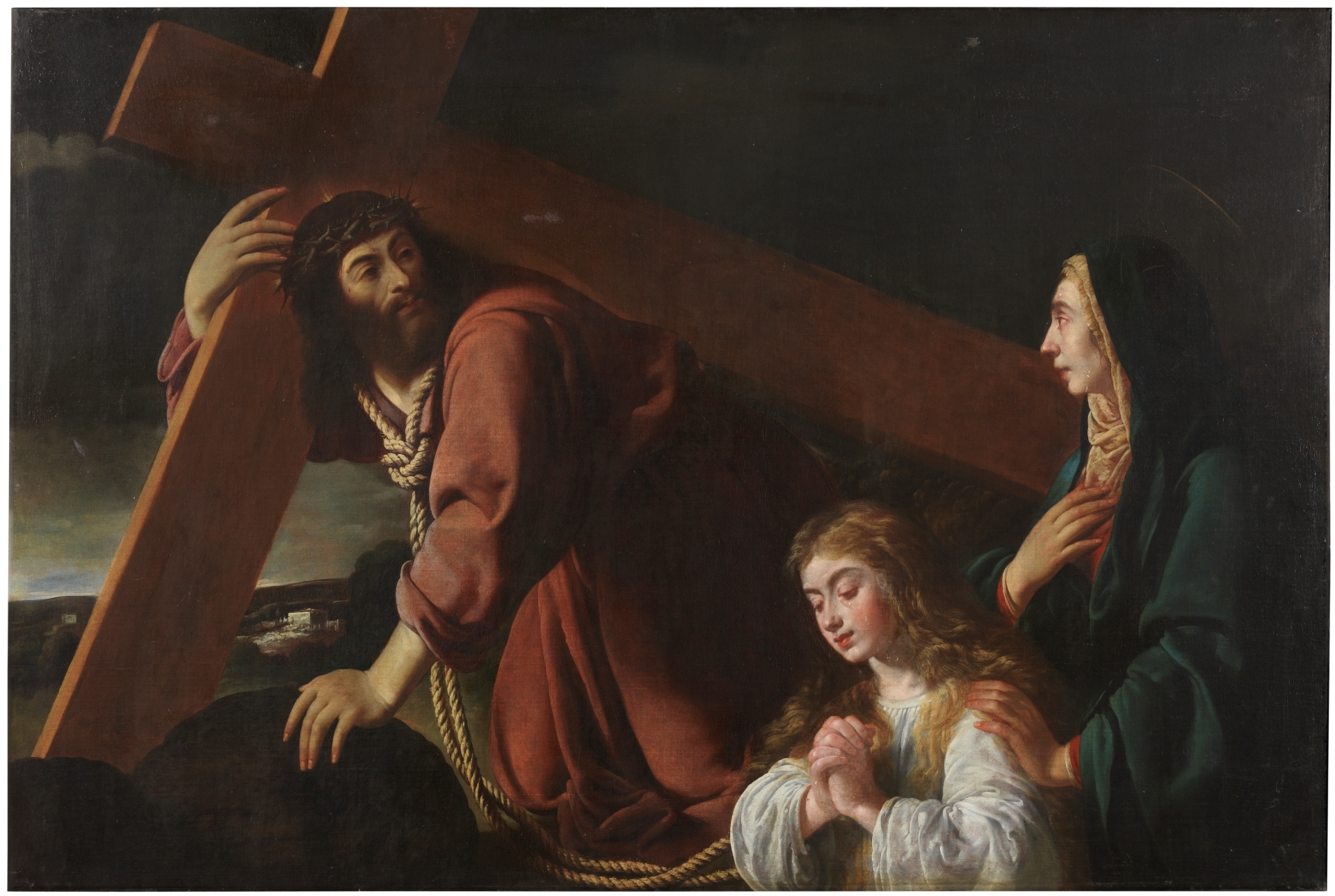
Christ carrying the Cross, contemplated by Mary and the Christian Soul, ca. 1630–1650. Oil on canvas, 124 x 185 cm, Madrid, Museo del Prado.
