= Rodrigo de Villandrando (painter) =

Spanish painter

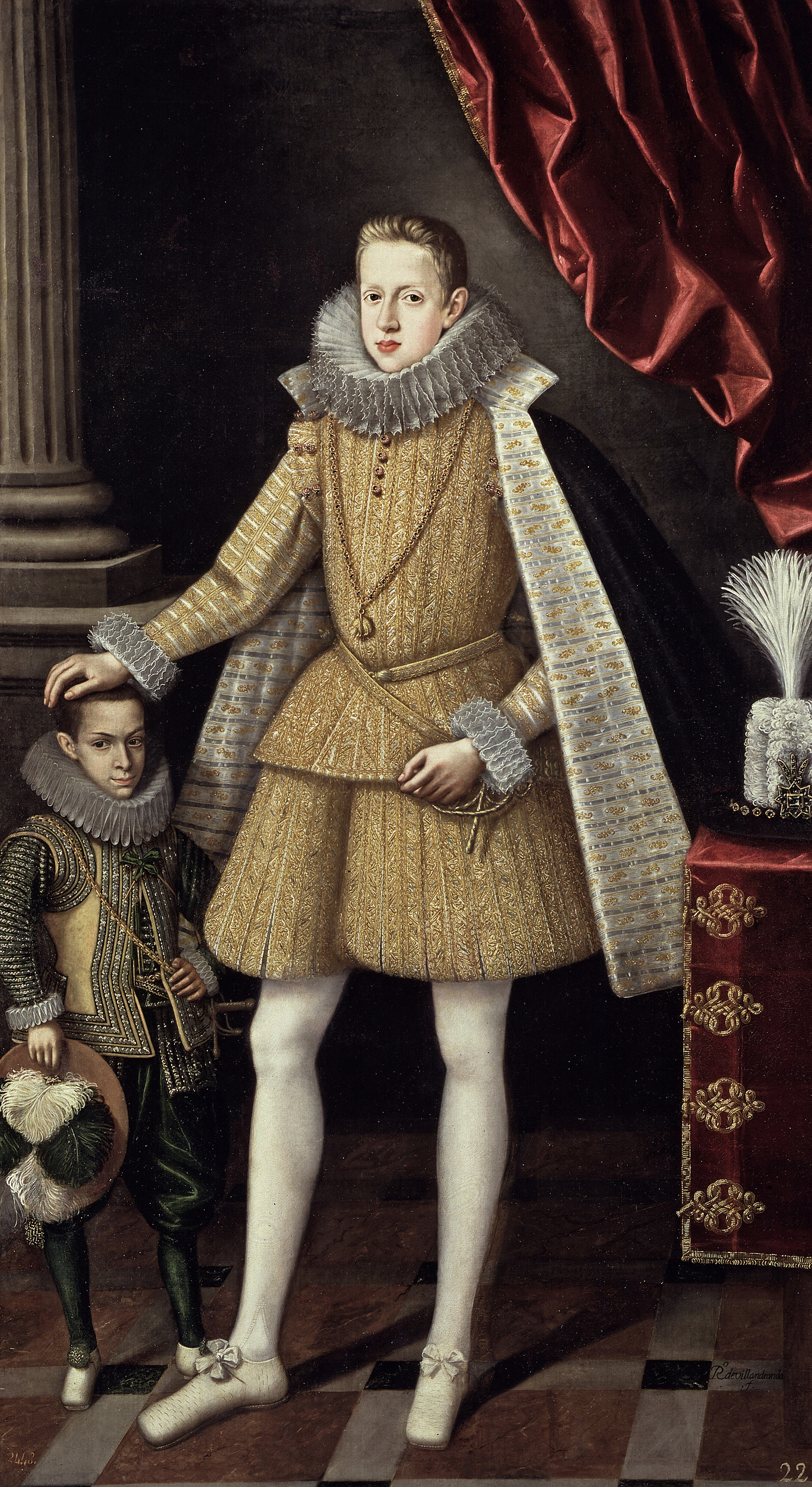
Portrait of infante Felipe (future Phillip IV) with dwarf Soplillo by Villandrando. 1620.

Rodrigo de Villandrando (1588 – December 1622) was a court painter during the reign of Philip III of Spain. He worked in the tradition of Alonso Sánchez Coello and Juan Pantoja de la Cruz. His death opened the road to court for the young painter Diego Velázquez from Sevilla.

== Works ==
In Prado:

- Felipe IV y el enano Soplillo
- Isabel de Francia, mujer de Felipe IV
