= Almohad wars in the Iberian Peninsula =

Conflicts of the Almohads during the Reconquista

The Almohad wars in the Iberian Peninsula were a series of conflicts that the Almohads had with the Christian kingdoms of the Iberian Peninsula. The Almohads arrived in the Iberian Peninsula in 1146, after overthrowing the Almoravids. However, their dominance in the peninsula would be weakened after their defeat at the Battle of Las Navas de Tolosa in 1212.

== Background ==
The Almoravid Dynasty had fallen in Iberia during the Second Crusade and the Second Period of Taifas had arrived. The Almohads arrived at Iberia in 1146 but Christians quickly conquered Santarém, Lisbon, Tortosa and Tarragona before them. (Note: During the Second Crusade) It was not until 1172 that the Almohads finished conquering the Taifas.

== Wars ==
=== First conflicts with the Christians: 1172–1189 ===
==== Cuenca ====
In 1172, Yusuf I began a series of attacks in Castile and destroyed several small Castilian border garrisons. He also attempted to take Huete but failed and was forced to retreat. Alfonso VIII took the opportunity and began a counter-offensive in Cuenca, from which came great danger since the Almohads used it as an outpost in their continuous attacks against Castile. The city was well fortified so Alfonso VIII, with the help of Alfonso II of Aragon, carried out a long siege and captured it in 1177. Alfonso VIII also captured Alarcón in 1183.

==== Portuguese incursions in Almohad territory ====
In 1178, Prince Sancho of Portugal launched a campaign against the Almohad Caliphate. He raided Seville and burned Triana. A few years later, in 1182 or 1183, a new Portuguese expedition composed of local militias from Lisbon and Santarém plundered the Aljarafe, an area of villages and olive groves, taking a large number of captives.

==== Santarém ====
In the spring of 1184, Abu Yaqub Yusuf decided to attack Santarem, Portugal, which was defended by Afonso I of Portugal. Upon hearing of Abu Yusuf's attack, Ferdinand II of León marched his troops to Santarém to support Afonso I.
Abu Yusuf, thinking he had sufficient troops to maintain the siege, sent orders for part of his army to march to Lisbon and lay siege to that city too. The orders were misinterpreted and his army, seeing large contingents of men leaving the battle, became confused and started to retreat. Abu Yusuf, in an attempt to rally his troops, was wounded by a crossbow bolt and died on 29 July 1184.

=== Almohad campaigns: 1190–1197 ===
==== Southern Portugal ====
The Almohad Caliphate launched a major offensive against the Kingdom of Portugal in the spring of 1190 that lasted into the summer of 1191. The Caliph Yaʿqūb al-Manṣūr crossed over from Africa to take personal command of his forces. The campaign of 1190 was underwhelming because of poor logistics, stubborn Portuguese resistance and assistance Portugal received from passing armies of the Third Crusade. The sieges of Tomar, Santarém and Silves had to be abandoned, but the caliph overwintered in Seville. The campaign of 1191 reversed Portugal's recent reconquests, captured Silves after a second siege and pushed the frontier north to the Tagus.

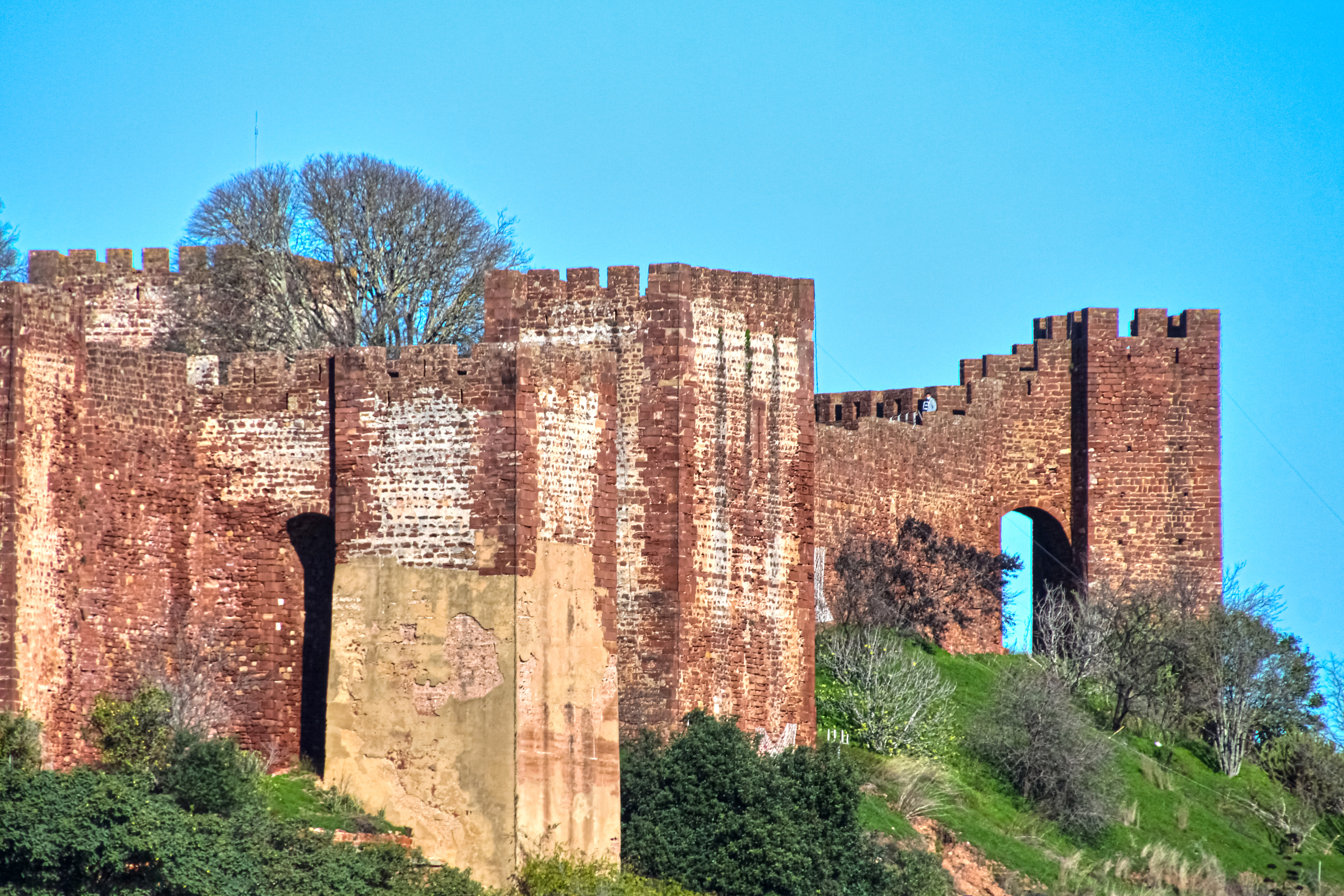
The walls of Silves today

Yaʿqūb al-Manṣūr, the new Almohad caliph, decided to invade Portugal after they conquered Silves. Yaqub was joined by forces from Seville and Granada and laid siege to Silves but he left operations in the hands of local troops and took most of his expeditionary force to Córdoba. At Córdoba, the caliph met an embassy from Alfonso VIII of Castile and they signed a truce, this was good news for Yaqub as it meant he could focus on his campaign against Portugal. He invaded Alentejo and the town of Torres Novas surrendered. He began to besiege Tomar but failed to capture the city. The main objective of al-Manṣūr was to capture Santarém, which he besieged in 1190 but he was defeated by Sancho I and English crusaders. This campaign was a failure.

In 1191, Yaqub launched a second attempt to reconquer Silves. He captured Alcácer do Sal, Torres Novas, and later the towns of Palmela, Coina and Almada. Leiria was destroyed and the Almohads raided as far north as the environs of Coimbra. He also recaptured the Castle of Alvor, whose population had been massacred in 1189. For his second siege of Silves, Yaqub brought four times as many siege engines as the defenders had. He started the siege in late June and ended in 25 July, as an Almohad victory. He also captured Beja. After signing a five-year truce with Sancho, Yaqub returned to Africa. He had pushed the border north as far as the Tagus, leaving Portugal only one significant fortress to its south, at Évora.

==== Castilian campaign in Al-Andalus of 1195 ====
Alfonso VIII, after his truce with the Almohads expired, he received news that Yaʿqūb al-Manṣūr was gravely ill in Marrakesh and that his brother Abu Yahya, the governor of Al-Andalus, had crossed the Mediterranean to declare himself king and take over Marrakesh. He took the opportunity and began an expedition to the region of Seville. Having successfully crushed his brother's ambitions, Yaqub al-Mansur was left with no choice other than to lead an expedition against the Christians, who were now threatening his empire in Iberia. On July 4 Ya'qub and his army crossed the pass of Muradal (Despeñaperros) and advanced through the plain of Salvatierra. A cavalry detachment of the Order of Calatrava and some knights from nearby castles tried to gather news about the Almohad strength and its heading but they were surrounded by Muslim scouts and almost massacred, but managed to provide information to the Castilian king.

===== Battle of Alarcos =====
Battle of Alarcos (July 18, 1195) was fought between the Almohads led by Abu Yusuf Ya'qub al-Mansur and King Alfonso VIII of Castile. It resulted in the defeat of the Castilian forces and their subsequent retreat to Toledo, whereas the Almohads reconquered Trujillo, Montánchez, and Talavera.

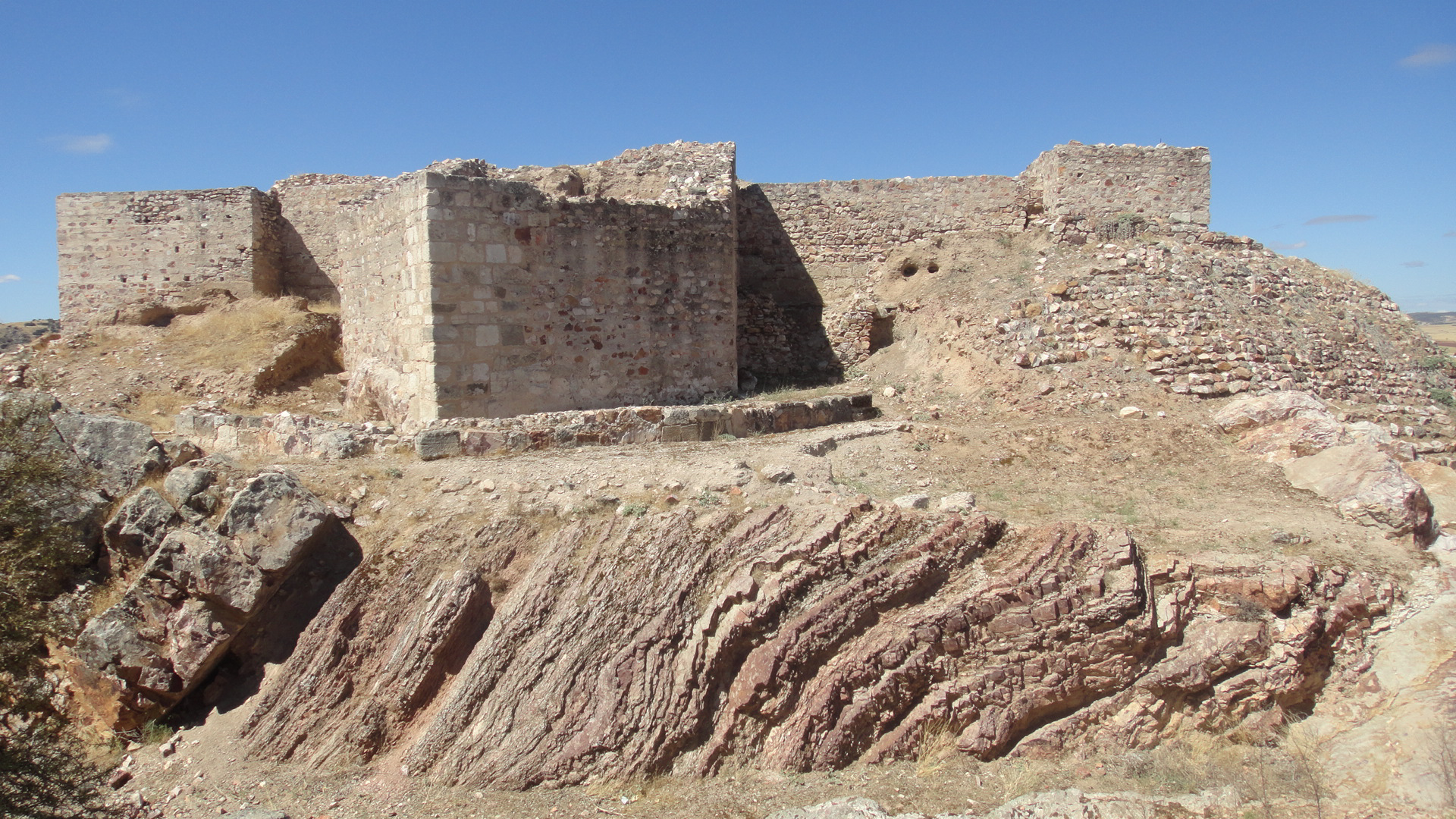
The castle of Alarcos

Alfonso gathered his forces at Toledo and marched down to Alarcos, a place which marked the Southern limit of his kingdom and where a fortress was under construction. The other Spanish Christian kingdoms feared that the Almohads would succeed, so Alfonso VIII received offers of help from Alfonso IX of León and Sancho VI of Navarre, which he accepted. But seeing that they were taking a long time to arrive, he decided to face the Almohads alone. When on July 16 the Almohad host came in view, Yaqub al-Mansur did not accept battle on this day or the day after, preferring to give rest to his forces; but early the day after that, on July 18, the Almohads formed for battle around a small hill called La Cabeza, two bow-shots from Alarcos.

It was a formidable army, whose strength Alfonso had badly underestimated. The Castilian king put most of his heavy cavalry in a compact body, about 8,000 strong, and gave its command to Diego López II de Haro. The king himself would follow with the infantry and the Military Orders. Most of the knights turned to their left and after a fierce struggle they routed the al-Andalus forces of Ibn Sanadid. Three hours had passed; just afternoon, in the intense heat, the fatigue and the missiles which kept falling on them took their toll of armoured knights. Alfonso advanced with all his remaining forces into the melee, only to find himself assaulted from all sides and under a rain of arrows. For some time he fought hand-to-hand, until removed from the action, almost by force, by his bodyguard; they fled towards Toledo. The Castilian infantry was destroyed, together with most of the Orders which had supported them; the Lord of Vizcaya tried to force his way through the ring of enemy forces, but finally had to seek refuge in the unfinished fortress of Alarcos with just a fraction of his knights. The castle was surrounded with some 3,000 people trapped inside, half of them women and children. The king's enemy, Pedro Fernández de Castro, who had taken little part in the action, was sent by the Amir to negotiate the surrender; Diego López II de Haro and the survivors were allowed to go, leaving 12 knights as hostages for the payment of a great ransom.

==== After Alarcos: Castilian-Leonese War of 1196–1197 ====
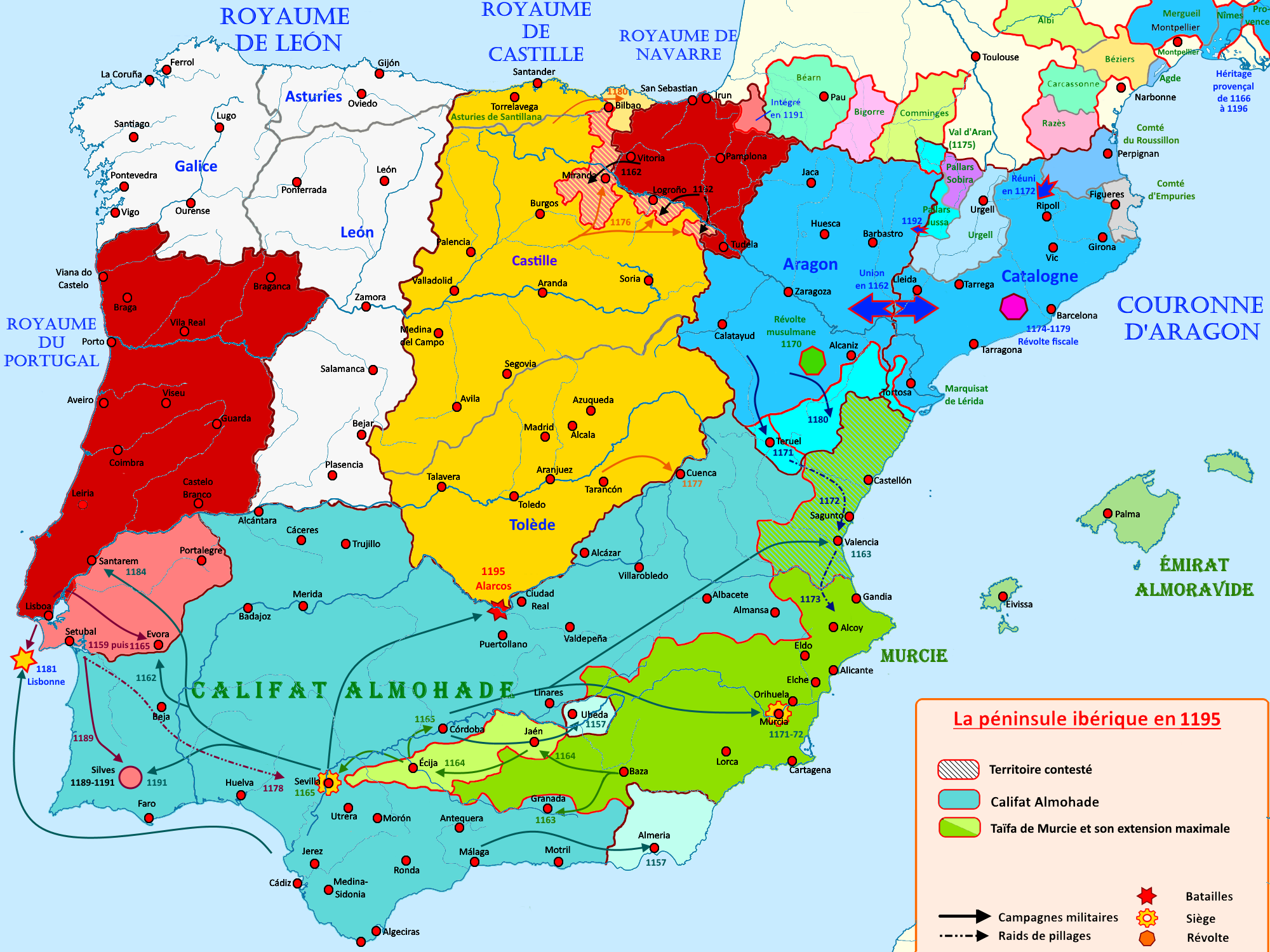
Map of the Iberian Peninsula in 1195.

The Castilian field army had been destroyed. The outcome of the battle shook the stability of the Kingdom of Castile for several years and all nearby castles surrendered or were abandoned: Malagón, Benavente, Calatrava la Vieja, Caracuel, and Torre de Guadalferza, and the way to Toledo was wide open. However, both sides had considerable casualties, including the Almohads, who could not continue with their campaign. The Almohads obtained an alliance with King Alfonso IX of León, who was angry with Alfonso VIII, who did not wait for him to fight the battle in Alarcos.

After this, Alfonso IX of Leon (with Almohad and Navarrese help), declared war on Castile, which was supported by Aragon. Alfonso VIII of Castile launched an invasion to Leon, taking Castroverde de Campos, Alba de Tormes, Ardón, Coyanza and Castro de los Judíos de Mayorga. He also approached Benavente (where Alfonso IX and his army were), invaded as far west as Bierzo (Near Portugal) and tried to capture Astorga but failed. In 1197, Alfonso IX recovered Castro de los Judíos de Mayorga while Alfonso VIII took Bárcena de la Abadía, Carpio and Pozuelo. The Almohads also tried to invade Castile and laid siege to Toledo, Maqueda, Talavera de la Reina and Santa Olalla but only succeeding in the last one. These towns were defended by Diego López II de Haro and Fernando Ruiz de Azagra, lord of Albarracín. The Almohads also took Plasencia, Mount Angio and Turgelo.

This conflict turned out to be a Castilian victory but there were no territorial changes because the Papal states mediated the conflict and condemned both kingdoms for disapproving of the marriage between Alfonso IX and Berengaria of Castile (since it would lead to a peace between Castile and Leon). In the end, that marriage did take place and led to a peace between both kingdoms in 1197. The Kingdom of Castile and the Almohads also signed a truce that lasted until 1211.

=== Crusade of 1211–1212 ===
==== Preparation of the crusade ====
Alfonso VIII found himself in a dangerous situation: the disturbing possibility of losing Toledo and the entire Tagus Valley, which is why the king asked Pope Innocent III in 1211 to preach a crusade to which not only his Castilian subjects responded, but also king Peter II of Aragon, Sancho VII of Navarre, the military Orders such as the Order of Calatrava, Knights Templar, Santiago and Saint John, and crusaders from all over Europe. (Note: From Portugal, France, León and Occitania.)

==== Crusade ====
Hostilities began in 1211, when Alfonso VIII broke the truce he had with the Almohads and attacked Andalusian territory. Al-Nasir was forced to intervene and landed in the Iberian Peninsula that same year. While the Christians devastated the lands of Jaén, the Almohads surpassed Sierra Morena and the Fortress of Salvatierra, the most important fortress of the Order of Calatrava since the Almohads took the castle of Calatrava. In June 1212, Alfonso VIII took Guadalerzas, Malagón, Calatrava and Caracuel.

===== Battle of Las Navas de Tolosa =====
The Battle of Las Navas de Tolosa, known in Islamic history as the Battle of Al-Uqab (Arabic: معركة العقاب), took place on 16 July 1212 and was an important turning point in the Reconquista and the history of medieval Spain. The Christian forces were led by King Alfonso VIII of Castile, joined by his rivals, Kings Sancho VII of Navarre and Peter II of Aragon. The Muslim army was led by caliph al-Nasir (Miramamolín in the Spanish chronicles), ruler of the Almohad Caliphate, which included the southern half of the Iberian Peninsula and Morocco.

Navas de Tolosa (also called Las Navas) is a town and hamlet in southern Spain, in the municipality of La Carolina, in the province of Jaén, in the eastern part of the Sierra Morena region, 15 kilometres (9.3 mi) from the border with the province of Ciudad Real.

In July 16, Alfonso VIII, Peter II of Aragon and Sancho VII of Navarre fought against Muhammad al-Nasir, the Almohad caliph, in Navas de Tolosa (near Santa Elena). The battle was fought at relatively close range, so that neither the Almohads nor the Christians could use archers in the melee-dominated fight.

The "Banner of the Moors", captured by the Christians during the battle

Christian knights became locked in close-quarter combat, in which they were superior to the Almohads. Christian knights from the Order of Santiago breached the Almohad defense, inflicting heavy casualties and creating gaps that allowed for a potential spearhead. King Sancho VII led his knights through the gaps and charged at the Caliph, who was surrounded by a bodyguard of black slave-warriors. Though initially believed that these men were chained to prevent escape, it’s now thought to stem from a mistranslation of "serried," referring to a dense formation. The Navarrese, led by King their king Sancho VII, broke through this bodyguard. The Caliph escaped, but the Moors were defeated with heavy casualties. The victorious Christians captured war prizes, including Muhammad al-Nasir's tent and standard, which were delivered to Pope Innocent III.

==== After Las Navas de Tolosa ====
Christian losses were around 2,000 men while Muslim losses were around 20,000 men. Notable Christian casualties included Pedro Gómez de Acevedo (Order of Calatrava), Alvaro Fernández de Valladares (Order of Santiago), and Gomes Ramires (Knights Templar). Ruy Díaz (Order of Calatrava) was severely wounded and had to resign. This battle is considered to be one of the most important battles in the Reconquista and the most important battle of this period. Christians also defeated Muslims in Úbeda and Baeza in the next 8 days.
Despite his great victory, Alfonso VII did not continue with his campaign, preferring to let his soldiers rest. A truce was signed short after this battle, in 1214.

== Aftermath ==
Map of the Iberian Peninsula in 1224, 12 years after the Battle of Las Navas de Tolosa.

The crushing defeat of the Almohads significantly hastened their decline both in the Iberian Peninsula and in the Maghreb a decade later. That gave further impulse to the Christian Reconquest and sharply reduced the already declining power of the Moors in Iberia and soon divided into smaller Muslim kingdoms. Muhammad al-Nasir did not overcome the defeat of this battle, he went to Marrakesh and locked himself in his palace until his death a year later. Castile conquered central Spain and some decades later conquered more territories in southern Spain like Seville, Córdoba and Jaén. Aragon would conquer Mallorca between 1228–1231 and Valencia in 1238. The only Taifa that would survive after the mid-13th century would be the Kingdom of Granada, which became a Castilian vassal, although it would also be a Marinid vassal for a brief period of time during the Battle of the Strait. After this conflict, the Kingdom of Granada was isolated until the Christian conquest of the kingdom between 1482-1492, which marked the end of the Reconquista.

== Bibliography ==
- Pilar Rabade Obrado, Maria (2005). La dinámica política (in Spanish). Ediciones AKAL. ISBN 8470904337.
- De la Torre, José (2018). Breve historia de la Reconquista (in Spanish). Nowtilus. ISBN 978-8499679662.
- Checa Sainz, Antonio (2017). Historia de Buciegas: Un pueblo español (in Spanish). Vision Libros. ISBN 978-8490116623.
- Garcia Fitz, Francisco (1998). Castilla y León frente al Islam: estrategias de expansión y tácticas militares (siglos XI-XIII) (in Spanish). Universidad de Sevilla. ISBN 9788447204212.
- Gómez, Miguel; Lincoln, Kyle C.; Smith, Damian J. (2 April 2019). King Alfonso VIII of Castile: Government, Family, and War. Fordham University Press. ISBN 978-0-8232-8416-0.
- Guggenberger, Anthony (1913). A General History of the Christian Era: The Papacy and the Empire. Vol. 1. bB. Herder.
- Bressler, Richard (2018). The Thirteenth Century: A World History. McFarland. ISBN 9781476671857.
- Todd Carey, Brian (2024). Warfare in the Age of Crusades: Europe. Pen and Sword Military. ISBN 9781526730183.
- Flood, Timothy M. (2018). Rulers and Realms in Medieval Iberia, 711-1492. McFarland. ISBN 9781476633725.
- Bianchini, Janna (2012). The Queen's Hand, Power and Authority in the Reign of Berenguela of Castile. University of Pennsylvania Press. ISBN 9780812206265.
- Martin, Georges (2010). Construir la identidad en la Edad Media (in Spanish). Univ de Castilla La Mancha. p. 118. ISBN 9788490440254.
- Sancha, Don Antonio de (1783). Colección de crónicas de Castilla: Volumen 4 (in Spanish). Imprenta de don Antonio de Sancha.
- Garcia Fitz, Francisco (2005). Las Navas de Tolosa: La batalla del castigo (in Spanish). Desperta Ferro Ediciones. ISBN 8412806816.
- Izquierdo Benito, Ricardo (1996). الارك ٨٩٢ (in Spanish). Univ de Castilla La Mancha. ISBN 9788489492349.
- Cozar Martinez, Fernando (1884). Noticias y documentos para la historia de Baeza (in Spanish). Estab. Tip. de los señores Rubio.
- Kohn, George C. (2006). Dictionary of Wars. Infobase. ISBN 9781438129167.
- Travel, DK (2017). DK Eyewitness Travel Guide Morocco. Dorling Kindersley Limited. ISBN 9780241304693.
- Dangler, Jean (2017). Edging Toward Iberia. University of Toronto Press. ISBN 9781487501235.
- Enchevarria, Ana (2013). Atlas histórico de la Edad Media (in Spanish). Editorial Universitaria Ramon Areces. ISBN 9788499611235.
- Slaughter, John E (1968). The Conquest of Silves: A Contemporary Narrative (PDF).
- Jayyusi, Salma (1992). The Legacy of Muslim Spain. BRILL. ISBN 978-90-04-09599-1.
- Hourihane, Colum (2012). The Grove Encyclopedia of Medieval Art and Architecture: Volume 1. Oxford University Press. ISBN 978-0-19-539536-5.
- Lay, S. (2008). The Reconquest Kings of Portugal: Political and Cultural Reorientation on the Medieval Frontier. ISBN 9780230583139.
- Nolan, Cathal J. (2006). The Age of Wars of Religion, 1000-1650: An Encyclopedia of Global Warfare and Civilization · Tomo 1. ISBN 9780313337338.
- al-Marrakushi, Abdelwahid (1224). Al-Mojib fi Talkhis Akhbar al-Maghrib (The Pleasant In Summarizing the History of the Maghreb).
- Garcia Fitz, Francisco (2002). Relaciones políticas y guerra: la experiencia castellano-leonesa frente al Islam, siglos XI-XIII (in Spanish). Universidad de Sevilla. ISBN 9788447207084.
- De las Heras, Jesus (2008). La Orden Calatrava: Religión, Guerra y Negocio (in Spanish). ISBN 9788441420663.
- Ward, Aengus (2006). Estoria Delos Godos: Critical Edition and Introduction (in Spanish). Society for the Study of Medieval Languages and Literature. ISBN 9780907570172.
- El Hareir, Idris (2011). The Spread of Islam: Throughout the World. UNESCO. ISBN 9789231041532.
- Galan, Ignacio (2024). Historia de España comentada con Pablo Salvat (in Spanish). Letrame Grupo Editorial. ISBN 9788410682672.
- Dorling Kindersley (2021). Battles Map by Map. Dorling Kindersley Limited. ISBN 9780241531853.
- Kaljundi, Linda (2011). Crusading and Chronicle Writing on the Medieval Baltic Frontier. Routledge. ISBN 9781317156796.
- Dolan Gomez, Miguel (2011). The Battle of Las Navas de Tolosa: The Culture and Practice of Crusading in Medieval Iberia.
- O'Callaghan, Joseph F. (2002). The Latin Chronicle of the Kings of Castile. Arizona Center for Medieval and Renaissance Studies. ISBN 9780866982788.
- Pennell, C. R. (2013). Morocco: From Empire to Independence. Simon and Schuster. ISBN 9781780744551.
- Gebhardt, Victor (1864). Historia general de España y de sus Indias, desde los tiempos más remotos hasta nuestro días (in Spanish). Librería de D.A. de San Martín.
- Buresi, Pascal (2013). Governing the Empire. BRILL. ISBN 9789004233331.
- Gerli, E. Michael (2016). Medieval Iberia: An Encyclopedia. Routledge. ISBN 978-1-351-66578-0.
- Bennison, Amira K. (2016). Almoravid and Almohad Empires. ISBN 9780748646821.
- Barton, Simon (2002). The Aristocracy in Twelfth-Century León and Castile. Cambridge University Press. ISBN 9780521894067.
- Jamieson, Alan G. (2006). Faith and Sword: A Short History of Christian-Muslim Conflict. Reaktion Books. ISBN 9781861892720.
- Keen, Maurice (1999). Medieval Warfare: A History. OUP Oxford. ISBN 9780191542527.
- Valor Piechotta, Magdalena (1999). Sevilla almohade (in Spanish). Fundación de las Tres Culturas del Mediterráneo. ISBN 9788480951951.
- Barton, Simon (2009). A History of Spain. ISBN 9781137013477.
- O'Callaghan, Joseph F. (2013). Reconquest and Crusade in Medieval Spain. ISBN 9780812203066.
- Rogers, Clifford J. (2010). The Oxford Encyclopedia of Medieval Warfare and Military Technology. Oxford University Press. ISBN 978-0-19-533403-6.
- Katz, Ana (6 December 2016). Lazos del tiempo (in Spanish). LibrosEnRed. ISBN 978-1-62915-322-3.
- Sanz, Vicente Coscollá (2003). La Valencia musulmana (in Spanish). Carena Editors, S.l. ISBN 978-84-87398-75-9.
- Frediani, Andrea (19 November 2015). La storia del mondo in 1001 battaglie (in Italian). Newton Compton Editori. ISBN 978-88-541-8803-7.
- Ortigosa, José Luis (January 2013). La Cuestión Vasca: Desde la Prehistoria hasta la muerte de Sabino Arana (in Spanish). Vision Libros. ISBN 978-84-9011-425-4.
- Losada, Juan Carlos (6 July 2012). Batallas decisivas de la historia de España (in Spanish). Penguin Random House Grupo Editorial España. ISBN 978-84-03-01190-8.
- Robinson, Sir Tony (4 August 2023). Battles that Changed History: Epic Conflicts Explored and Explained. Dorling Kindersley Limited. ISBN 978-0-241-64348-8.
- Lieberman, Benjamin (22 March 2013). Remaking Identities: God, Nation, and Race in World History. Rowman & Littlefield Publishers. ISBN 978-1-4422-1395-1.
- González Jiménez, Manuel (2012). "Algeciras en la encrucijada de la batalla del Estrecho (siglos XIII y XIV)" (PDF). Boletín de la Real Academia Sevillana de Buenas Letras: Minervae Baeticae (40). Sevilla: Real Academia Sevillana de Buenas Letras: 453–464. ISSN 0214-4395.
- Kennedy, Hugh (2014-06-11). Muslim Spain and Portugal: A Political History of al-Andalus. Routledge. ISBN 978-1-317-87041-8.
- Harrison, William Henry (1865). Bradshaw's illustrated hand-book to Spain and Portugal.
- IslamKotob. الأنيس المطرب بروض القرطاس (in Arabic). IslamKotob.
- Conde, José Antonio (1825). Histoire de la domination des Arabes et des Maures en Espagne et en Portugal, depuis l'invasion de ces peuples jusqu'à leur expulsion définitive (in French). Eymery.
- Barroca, Mário Jorge (2006). "Portugal". The Crusades: An Encyclopedia. In Alan V. Murray.
- A history of portugal. CUP Archive. 1947-01-19.
- Grande enciclopédia portuguesa e brasileira: ilustrada com cêrca de 15.000 gravuras e 400 estampas a côres (in Portuguese). Editorial Enciclopédia. 1959.
- Stanislawski, Dan (2014-11-11). The Individuality of Portugal: A Study in Historical-Political Geography. University of Texas Press. ISBN 978-1-4773-0509-6.
- Kaufmann, J. E.; Kaufmann, H. W. (2019-07-30). Castle to Fortress: Medieval to Post-Modern Fortifications in the Lands of the Former Roman Empire. Pen and Sword. ISBN 978-1-5267-3688-8.
- Fiolhais, Carlos; Franco, José Eduardo; Paiva, José Pedro (2021-12-06). The Global History of Portugal: From Pre-History to the Modern World. Liverpool University Press. ISBN 978-1-80207-133-7.
- Hunt, Lynn; Hsia, R. Po-chia; Martin, Thomas R.; Rosenwein, Barbara H.; Smith, Bonnie (2007). The Making of the West: Peoples and Cultures: A Concise History. Vol. 1. New York. ISBN 978-0-312-43946-0.
- Hyland, Paul (1996). Backwards Out of the Big World: A Voyage Into Portugal. HarperCollins. ISBN 978-0-00-255556-2.
- Miranda, Ambrósio Huici (1954). Las Campañas de Yaʼqub al-Mansur en 1190 y 1191 (in Spanish). Academia Portuguesa da Historia.
- De la Peña, Juan Ignacio Ruiz (2009). Cristianos y musulmanes en la Península Ibérica: La guerra, la frontera y la convivencia (in Spanish). Fundación Sánchez-Albornoz. ISBN 978-84-923109-7-5.
- Wilson, Jonathan (2020). "'Neither age nor sex sparing': The Alvor Massacre 1189, an Anomaly in the Portuguese Reconquista?". Journal of Medieval Iberian Studies. 12 (2): 1–31 [199–229]. doi:10.1080/17546559.2019.1704043. S2CID 214374323.
- Fierro, Maribel (18 January 2021). The Maghrib in the Mashriq: Knowledge, Travel and Identity. Walter de Gruyter GmbH & Co KG. ISBN 978-3-11-071344-2.
- Shadis, Miriam (26 October 2009). Berenguela of Castile (1180-1246) and Political Women in the High Middle Ages. Springer. ISBN 978-0-230-10313-9.
- Itinerario cultural de Almorávides y Almohades: Magreb y Península Ibérica (in Spanish). Fundación El legado andalusí. 1999. ISBN 978-84-930615-0-0.
- Changqi, Cui (1999). 新编英汉汉英军事词典 (in Chinese and English). 国防工业出版社. ISBN 9787118020410.
- Charles, Phillips (2004). Encyclopedia of Wars. Facts On File. ISBN 9780816028511.
- "Timeline for War 1100-1199 AD". Nevington War Museum. Weebly. 2007.
- Pereira, Rui Carlos (2015). O Planeamento Civil de Emergência no Novo Paradigma da Segurança (PDF) (in Portuguese). University of Lisbon.
- "War - 67 Bloody Christian Conflicts". Muslim Prophets. 19 August 2019.
- Martínez, Salvador H. (15 November 2021). Berenguela the Great and Her Times (1180-1246). BRILL. ISBN 978-90-04-50290-1.
- Obradó, María del Pilar Rábade; Vaquero, Eloísa Ramírez; Utrilla, Juan F. Utrilla (January 2005). La dinámica política (in Spanish). Ediciones AKAL. ISBN 978-84-7090-433-2.
- Catalán, Diego (2002). El Cid en la historia y sus inventores (in Spanish). Fundación Ramón Menéndez Pidal. ISBN 978-84-89934-06-1.
