= Villarrubia de los Ojos =

- Municipality
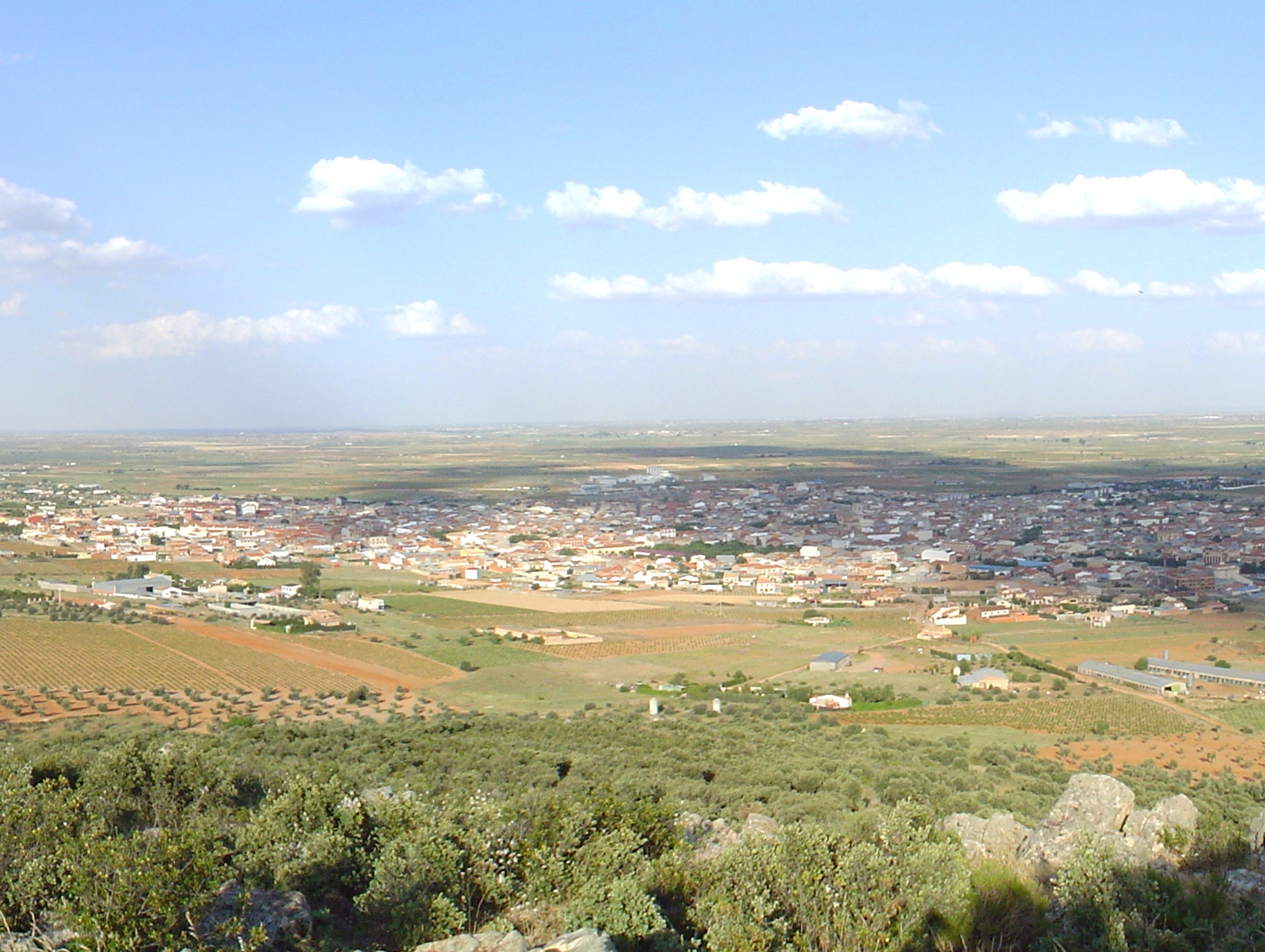

- Flag Coat of arms

- Location within Castilla-La Mancha Location within Spain
- Coordinates: 39°13′N 3°36′W
- Country: Spain
- Autonomous community: Castilla–La Mancha
- Province: Ciudad Real

Area
  - Total: 281.86 km^{2} (108.83 sq mi)
- Elevation: 624 m (2,047 ft)

Population (2025-01-01)
  - Total: 9,512
  - Density: 33.75/km^{2} (87.40/sq mi)
- Demonym(s): Villarrubiero, Villarrubiera
- Time zone: UTC+1 (CET)
  - Summer (DST): UTC+2 (CEST)
- Postal code: 13670

Villarrubia de los Ojos is a municipality of Spain located in the province of Ciudad Real, Castilla–La Mancha. The municipality spans across a total area of 281.86 km^{2} and, as of 1 January 2020, it has a registered population of 9,762.

== Geography ==
The Ojos del Guadiana are located within the Villarrubia de los Ojos municipal territory. They are the source of the Guadiana river, the fourth longest river of the Iberian peninsula. There's also a National Park, the Tablas de Daimiel National Park located in the Tablas de Daimiel wetlands, shared with the neighbouring municipality, Daimiel.

The landforms of Villarrubia de los Ojos are mountainous in the north and flat in the south. The weather is quite strong with very cold winters and very hot summers. There are some mountains over 1,200 metres and the flat zone is at 550 metres above sea level in the Spanish central plateau.

== History ==
Control over the territory passed from the Order of St. John of Jerusalem to the Order of Calatrava on the wake of the 1212 Battle of Las Navas de Tolosa. The demarcation of the area in the concord of 1232 confirmed the Calatravan control of Villarrubia.

Together with Aldea del Rey, Almagro, Bolaños and Daimiel, Villarrubia was one of the five towns of the Campo de Calatrava. By the end of the middle ages, Villarrubia, like the rest of the Campo de Calatrava, featured a quite large mudéjar population. In 1502, the Catholic Monarchs granted local moriscos from Villarrubia (and the wider Campo) tax exemptions, as if they were for all legal purposes old christians. Tightly assimilated into the local society, the moriscos from Villarrubia fiercely refused their decreed expulsion, and the local lord, the Count of Salinas (and President of the Council of Portugal), lobbied in order to curb the impact of the measure. Following the two expulsions from 1611 and 1612, most of the expelled moriscos were able to return to Villarrubia.

== Bibliography ==
- Benítez Sánchez-Blanco, Rafael (2008). "Trevor J. Dadson, Los moriscos de Villarubia de los Ojos". Mélanges de la Casa de Velázquez. 38–2 (38–2). Madrid: Casa de Velázquez: 245–249. doi:10.4000/mcv.625.
- Dadson, Trevor J. (2004). "Literacy and Education in Early Modern Rural Spain: the case of Villarrubia de los Ojos". Bulletin of Spanish Studies: Hispanic Studies and Research on Spain, Portugal and Latin America. 81 (7–8): 1011–1038. doi:10.1080/1475382042000297817. ISSN 1475-3820. S2CID 191583525.
- Dadson, Trevor J. (2004). "Un Ricote verdadero: el licenciado Alonso Herrador de Villarrubia de los Ojos del Guadiana - morisco que vuelve" (PDF). In Domínguez Matito, Francisco; Lobato, María Luisa (eds.). Memoria de la palabra : Actas del VI Congreso de la Asociación Internacional Siglo de Oro, Burgos-La Rioja 15-19 de julio 2002. Vol. 1. pp. 601–612. ISBN 978-84-8489-093-5.
- Dadson, Trevor J. (2007). Los moriscos de Villarrubia de los Ojos (siglos XV-XVIII). Historia de una minoría asimilada, expulsada y reintegrada. 1328 pp. Iberoamericana Vervuert. ISBN 978-84-8489-235-9.
- Dadson, Trevor J. (2009). "Los moriscos que no salieron". Pedralbes: Revista d'historia moderna (29). Barcelona: Universitat de Barcelona: 213–246. ISSN 0211-9587.
- Dadson, Trevor J. (2014). Tolerance and Coexistence in Early Modern Spain: Old Christians and Moriscos in the Campo de Calatrava. Rochester, NY: Tamesis. ISBN 978-1-85566-273-5.
- Jerez García, Óscar (2009). Villarrubia de los Ojos de Guadiana. Geografía, Paisaje y Medio Ambiente. 520 pp + CD. Madrid: CERSA. ISBN 978-84-92539-30-7.
- Martínez Almira, María Magdalena (2018). "Control y movilidad de la población morisca en los siglos XVI y XVII" (PDF). Musulmanes en indias. Itinerarios y nuevos horizontes para una comunidad bajo sospecha. Instituto de Investigaciones Jurídicas UNAM. ISBN 978-607-30-1136-5.
- Ruiz Gómez, Francisco (2002). "Los hijos de Marta. Las Órdenes Militares y las tierras de La Mancha en el siglo XII". Hispania. Revista Española de Historia. 62 (210). Madrid: Consejo Superior de Investigaciones Científicas: 9–40. doi:10.3989/hispania.2002.v62.i210.265. ISSN 0018-2141.
