= Battle of Alarcos =

1195 battle of Almohads and Castillians

- Part of the Reconquista and Almohad wars in the Iberian Peninsula
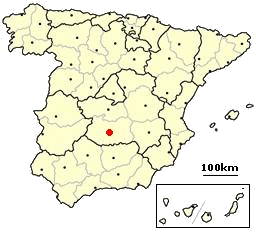
- Location of the battle
Date	July 18, 1195
Location	Alarcos, Ciudad Real province 38°57′10″N 4°0′0″W
Result	Almohad victory

Belligerents
Kingdom of Castile; Order of Santiago; Order of St. Benedict; Kingdom of Navarre; Kingdom of Leon; Kingdom of Aragon	Almohad Caliphate; Castilian rebels

Commanders and leaders
Alfonso VIII of Castile	Ya'qub al-Mansur

Strength
Undetermined; Modern estimate: More than 25,000	Undetermined; Modern estimate: 20,000

Battle of Alarcos (July 18, 1195) was fought between the Almohads led by Abu Yusuf Ya'qub al-Mansur and King Alfonso VIII of Castile. It resulted in the defeat of the Castilian forces and their subsequent retreat to Toledo, whereas the Almohads reconquered Trujillo, Montánchez, and Talavera.

== Background ==
In 1190, Almohad caliph al-Mansur traveled from North Africa to al-Andalus to invade Portugal, which had captured the city of Silves the prior year. After a campaign of approximately 15 months, al-Mansur successfully recaptured the city in July 1191 and then proceeded to return to his capital.

An armistice between the Almohads and the Christian kings of Castile and León ensued. At the expiration of the truce in 1194, Alfonso decided to invade Almohad territory in southern al-Andalus including the Guadalquivir River heartland. Alfonso struck at the time as he had learned that al-Mansur was gravely ill and that his brother, Abu Yahya, the governor of al-Andalus, had traveled to Marrakesh in an attempt to claim the Almohad throne for himself. Leading the invasion for Alfonso was Martín López de Pisuerga, the Archbishop of Toledo, supported by the military Order of Calatrava. Meanwhile in Marrakesh, al-Mansur recovered from his illness and reasserted control over his brother. Al-Mansur then initiated plans to lead an expedition back into al-Andalus to deal with the Christians invaders.

On the first day of June 1195, al-Mansur landed at Tarifa. Passing through the province of Seville, the main Almohad army reached Córdoba on June 30, reinforced by the troops of local governors and by a Christian cavalry contingent under Pedro Fernández de Castro, who held a personal feud against Alfonso. On July 4 al-Mansur departed Córdoba, traveled through the Muradal pass into the Campo de Calatrava and the fertile plain dominated by the fortress of Salvatierra. Along the way, al-Mansur's forces intercepted and surrounded a Christian cavalry detachment tracking the advancement of the Muslim army. The Christian forces were surrounded and virtually annihilated. Only a handful of Christian scouts managed to escape the encirclement and report back to Alfonso.

Alfonso gathered his forces at Toledo and marched down to Alarcos (al-Arak, in Arabic), near the Guadiana River, a place which marked the southern limit of his kingdom and where a fortress was under construction. He intended on barring access to the rich Tagus valley, and did not wait for the reinforcements en route from King Alfonso IX of León and King Sancho VII of Navarre. When the Almohad host came into view on July 16, al-Mansur did not accept battle immediately, preferring to give rest to his forces. On Wednesday, July 18, however, the Almohad army formed for battle around a small hill called La Cabeza, two bow-shots from Alarcos.

== Battle ==
Al-Mansur gave his vizier, Abu Yahya ibn Abi Hafs, command of a strong vanguard: On the first line were the Bani Marin volunteers under Abu Jalil Mahyu ibn Abi Bakr complete with a large number of archers and the Zenata tribe; behind them was the vizier with the Amir's banner and his personal guard, from the Hintata tribe; to the left were the Arab hosts under Yarmun ibn Riyah; and to the right were the al-Andalus forces under the popular Caid Ibn Sanadid. Al-Mansur himself held command of the rearguard, which consisted of the best Almohad forces commanded by Yabir ibn Yusuf, Abd al-Qawi, Tayliyun, Muhammad ibn Munqafad, and Abu Jazir Yajluf al-Awrabi along with the black African guard. It was a formidable army, whose strength Alfonso had badly underestimated. The Castilian king put most of his heavy cavalry in a compact group, about 8,000 strong, and gave its command to Diego López de Haro, lord of Vizcaya. The king himself would follow with the infantry and the Military Orders.

Alfonso chose to move first and ordered his forces to descend from their high position with the heavy cavalry charging across the lower plain. At the outset, the battle went well for the Christians. After initially striking the front lines of the Muslims, the Christian knights began a three hour engagement in which they first dispersed the Bani Marin and the Zenatas, then attacked the Hintata killing the vizier Abu Yahya, and finally struggled against and routed the al-Andalus forces of Ibn Sanadid. As the Christians fought, became fatigued, and fell however, the Arab left led by Yarmun enveloped their flank and rear. At this point, the Almohad rearguard led by al-Mansur attacked, surrounding the Christian knights.

At that time, Alfonso advanced with all his remaining forces into the melee, only to find himself assaulted from all sides under a rain of arrows. For some time he fought hand-to-hand, until removed from the action, almost by force, by his bodyguard; together they fled to Toledo. The Castilian infantry was destroyed, together with most of the Orders which had supported them; the Lord of Vizcaya tried to force his way through the ring of enemy forces, but finally had to seek refuge in the unfinished fortress of Alarcos with just a fraction of his knights. The castle was surrounded with some 3,000 people trapped inside, half of them women and children. The king's enemy, Pedro Fernández de Castro, who had taken little part in the action, was sent by the Amir to negotiate the surrender; López de Haro and the survivors were allowed to go, leaving 12 knights as hostages for the payment of a great ransom.

The Castilian field army had been destroyed. Those killed included three bishops (from Avila, Segovia, and Siguenza); Count Ordoño García de Roda and his brothers; Counts Pedro Ruiz de Guzmán and Rodrigo Sánchez; the Masters of the Order of Santiago, Sancho Fernández de Lemus, and of the Portuguese Order of St. Benedict, Gonçalo Viegas. Losses for the Muslims included the death of the vizier and Abi Bakr, commander of the Bani Marin volunteers, who died of his wounds in the following year.

== Aftermath ==
The outcome of the battle shook the stability of the Kingdom of Castile for several years. All nearby castles surrendered or were abandoned including Malagón, Benavente, Calatrava, Caracuel, and Torre de Guadalferza leaving the passage to Toledo wide open. Al-Mansur, however, returned to Seville to make good his own considerable losses; there he took the title of al-Mansur Billah ('The one victorious by God').

For the next two years, al-Mansur's forces devastated Extremadura, the Tagus valley, La Mancha and even the areas around Toledo; in turn, al-Mansur's forces moved against Montánchez, Trujillo, Plasencia, Talavera, Escalona and Maqueda. Some of these expeditions were led by the renegade Pedro Fernández de Castro. Most significantly, however, these raids did not lead to any territorial gains for the caliph, although Almohad diplomacy did obtain an alliance with King Alfonso IX of Léon (who had been enraged when the Castilian king had not waited for him before the battle) and the neutrality of the Kingdom of Navarre. These alliances proved to be only temporary.

But the caliph was losing interest in the affairs of the Iberian Peninsula; he was in poor health, his objective of retaining a hold over al-Andalus appeared to be a complete success, and in 1198 he returned to Africa. He died in February 1199.

Ultimately, the success of the battle proved to be short-lived. When the Almohad caliph Muhammad al-Nasir attempted to build on it 16 years later with a new Iberian offensive, he was defeated at the Battle of Las Navas de Tolosa (1212). That battle marked a turning-point that led to the end of Moorish rule in the Iberian Peninsula. The Almohad Caliphate itself collapsed a few decades later.

== See also ==
- Portugal in the Reconquista
