= Carrión de Calatrava =

- Municipality
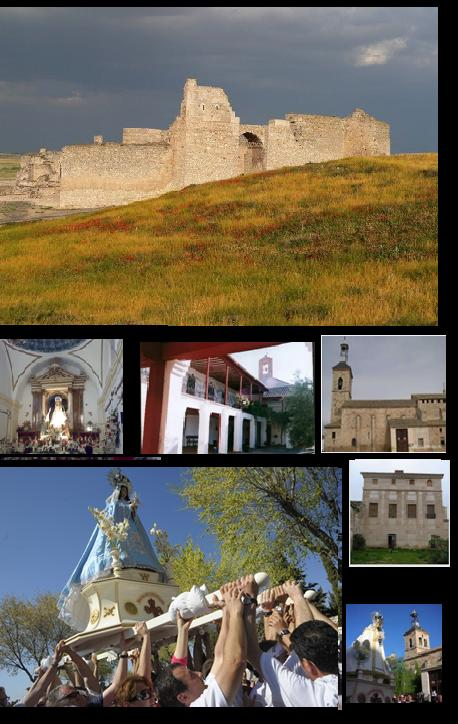
- Carrión de Calatrava

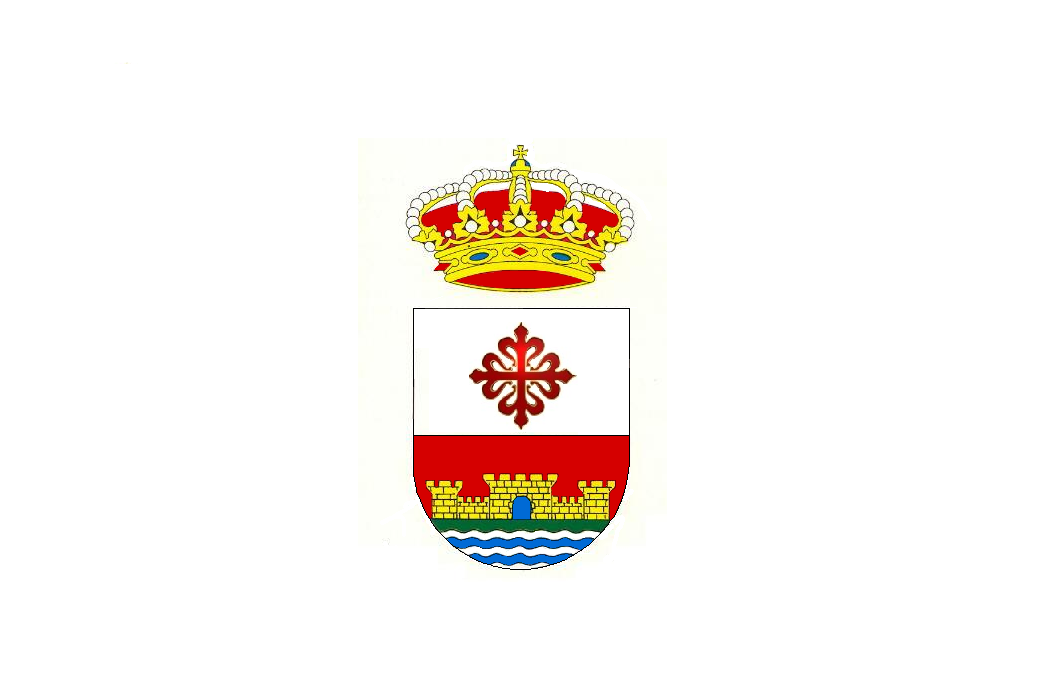
- Flag Coat of arms

- Location in Spain
- Coordinates: 39°01′6″N 3°49′4″W
- Country: Spain
- Autonomous community: Castile-La Mancha
- Province: Ciudad Real
- Comarca: Campo de Calatrava

Government
  - Mayor: Dionisio Moreno Antequera

Area
  - Total: 95.77 km^{2} (36.98 sq mi)

Population (2025-01-01)
  - Total: 3,239
  - Density: 32.05/km^{2} (83.0/sq mi)
- Demonym: Carrioneros
- Time zone: UTC+1 (CET)
  - Summer (DST): UTC+2 (CEST)
- Postal code: 13150

Carrión de Calatrava is a municipality in the province of Ciudad Real, Castile-La Mancha, Spain. The castle of Calatrava la Vieja is situated nearby, which is known to be connected to the Order of Calatrava.
