= Álvaro Fernández =

Álvaro Fernández may refer to:

- Alvaro Fernández de Valladares (died 1212), Spanish commandant
- Álvaro Fernández Armero (born 1969), Spanish director
- Álvaro Fernández (athlete) (born 1981), Spanish runner
- Álvaro Fernández (Uruguayan footballer) (born 1985), Uruguayan footballer
- Álvaro Fernández (footballer, born 1998), Spanish football goalkeeper
- Álvaro Carreras, (formerly Álvaro Fernández; born 2003), Spanish football defender

== See also ==
- Álvaro Fernandes, 15th century Portuguese explorer
