= Fall of Úbeda =

1212 siege in the Reconquista

Fall of Ubeda (1212)
- Part of the Reconquista and Almohad wars in the Iberian Peninsula
Date	August, 1212
Location	Ubeda, Spain
Result	Crusader victory

Belligerents
Kingdom of Castile; Knights Hospitaller; Portuguese crusaders; French crusaders; German crusaders; Italian crusaders	Almohad Caliphate

Commanders and leaders
Alfonso VIII of Castile; Peter II of Aragon	Unknown

Strength
12,000–14,000	70,000 inhabitants

Casualties and losses
Very light	60,000–70,000 killed or enslaved (exaggerated)

In August 1212, the major Andalusian city of Úbeda was besieged and captured by an army of crusaders led by Alfonso VIII of Castile. The conquest came as an aftermath of the victory at the Battle of Las Navas de Tolosa. The Muslim inhabitants of the town negotiated a peaceful surrender of the town to which Alfonso initially agreed. However, the other leaders of the crusade persuaded him to abandon the agreement and sack the city, leading to a violent massacre and mass enslavement of the inhabitants.

== Aftermath ==
The Crusaders managed to capture a huge amount of booty from the city's fall. The 13th-century Moroccan historian Abd al-Wahid al-Marrakushi wrote:

Alfonso -- God curse him! -- ... then descended on Úbeda, where many of the defeated Muslims, and the people of Baeza, as well as the town's own population, had collected. He invested it for thirteen days, and then took it by force, killing and capturing and plundering. He and his men set aside as prisoners enough women and children to fill all the Christian territories. This was a greater blow to the Muslims than the defeat in battle.
