= Aldea del Rey =

- Municipality
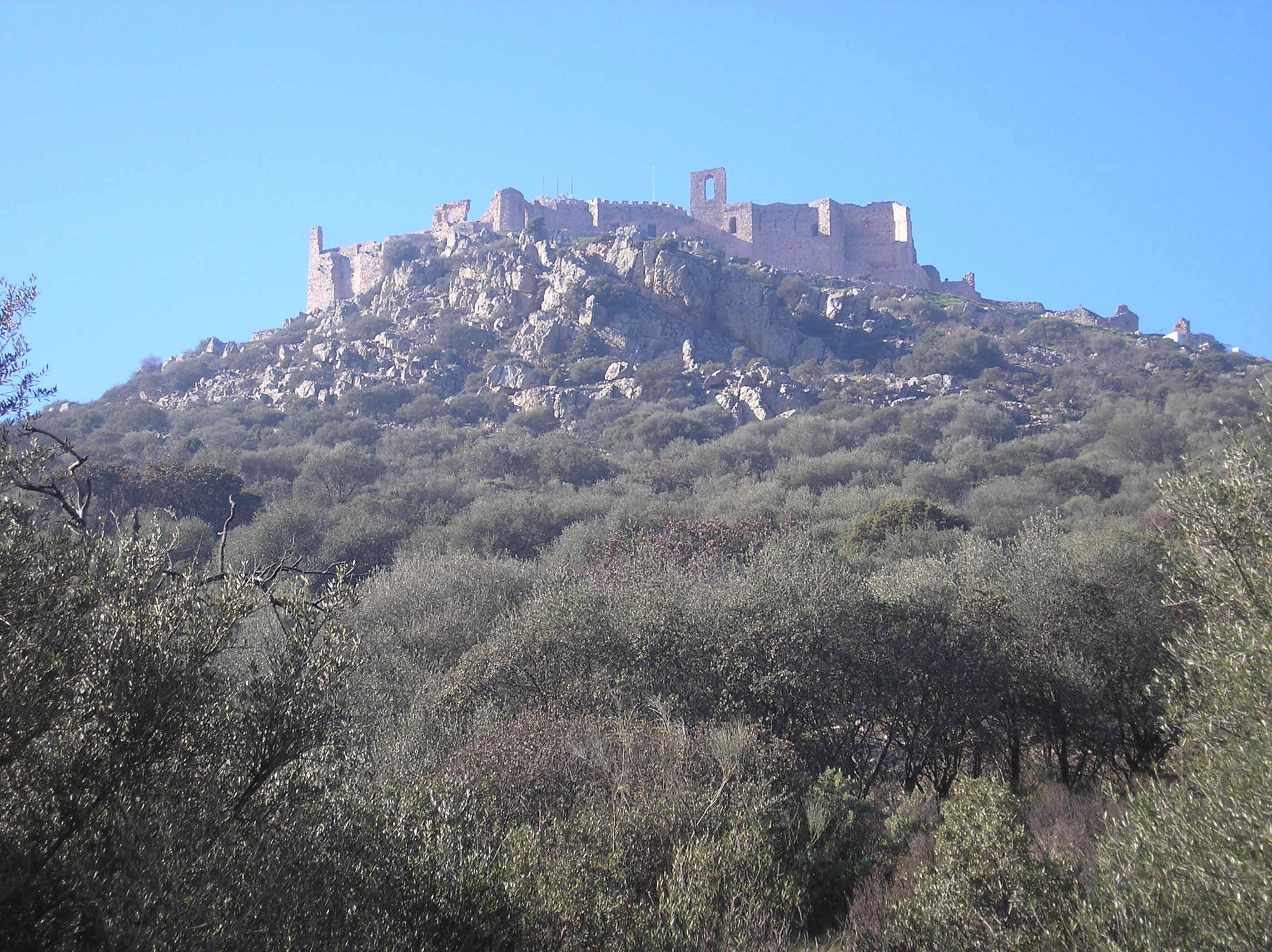
- Calatrava Castle

- Flag Coat of arms

- Location in Spain
- Coordinates: 38°44′20″N 3°50′21″W
- Country: Spain
- Autonomous community: Castile-La Mancha
- Province: Ciudad Real
- Comarca: Campo de Calatrava

Government
  - Mayor: Miguel Morales Molina

Area
  - Total: 154.31 km^{2} (59.58 sq mi)
- Elevation: 663 m (2,175 ft)

Population (2025-01-01)
  - Total: 1,565
  - Density: 10.14/km^{2} (26.27/sq mi)
- Demonym: Aldeanos
- Time zone: UTC+1 (CET)
  - Summer (DST): UTC+2 (CEST)
- Postal code: 13380
- Website: Official website

Aldea del Rey is a municipality in the province of Ciudad Real, Castile-La Mancha, Spain. It has a (decreasing) population of 1,721 (1-1-20.16).

== Main sights ==
- Castle of Calatrava la Nueva
- Renaissance Palacio de Clavería (15th century), founded by King Philip of Spain for the knights of the Order of Calatrava.
