= Salvatierra Castle =

Cultural property in Calzada de Calatrava, Spain

Coordinates: 38.6693°N 3.8218°W

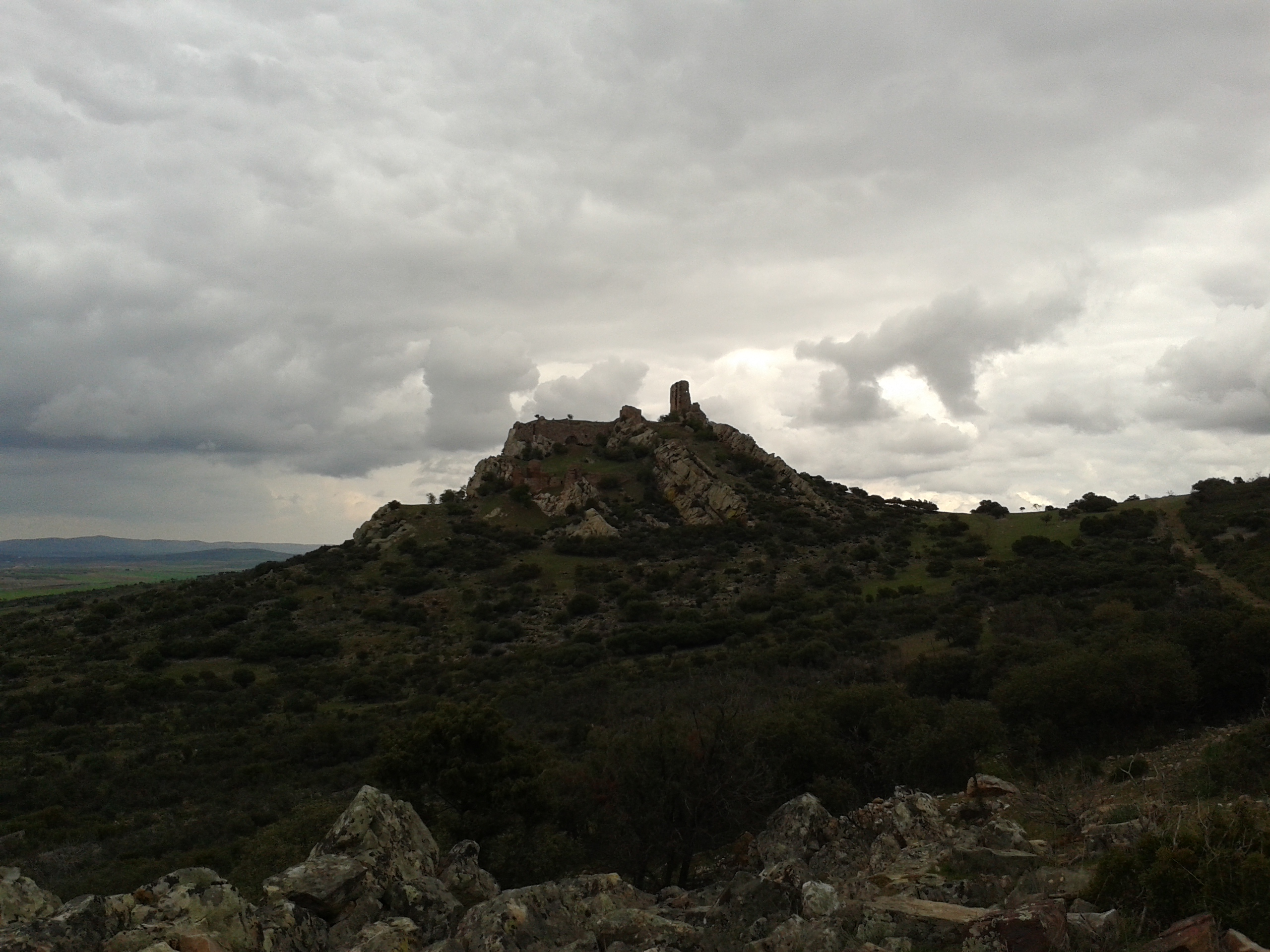
Ruins of the castle of Salvatierra

Salvatierra Castle is a fortification near Calzada de Calatrava in the south of the province of Ciudad Real, Castilla-La Mancha, Spain. It is located on a small hillock at the foot of the volcanic Mount Atalaya, about 5 kilometres (3.1 mi) from Calzada de Calatrava.

== History ==
Originally an Islamic building tentatively dating back to the 11th or 12th centuries, the castle passed to Christian control in the second half of the 12th century, returning to Muslim hands in 1195 after the Battle of Alarcos, to be soon conquered in 1197 by knights of the Order of Calatrava, who strengthened its defences.
It was seized by the Almohads in 1211, a year before the Battle of Las Navas. The Christians gave the castle a wide berth during the aforementioned campaign after taking the nearby castle of Calatrava, eventually deciding not to besiege Salvatierra, but to directly do battle with the Almohad Caliph instead. It was taken again by Christians circa 1225–26.
