= Campo de Calatrava Volcanic Field =

Volcanic field in Spain

Campo de Calatrava
- Calatrava Volcanic Field
- Location within Spain

Highest point
- Elevation: 1,117 m (3,665 ft)
- Coordinates: 38°52′N 4°01′W

Geography
- Location: Province of Ciudad Real

Geology
- Last eruption: 3600 BCE ± 500 years

The Campo de Calatrava volcanic field is a volcanic field in Spain. The volcanic field is in the centre of the province of Ciudad Real, in a region known as Campo de Calatrava.

The volcanic field has an area of more than 5000 km^{2} and more than 300 individual structures and contains pyroclastic cones, lava domes and maars. The field erupted basaltic to foiditic lavas from the Pliocene to the Holocene in Columba volcano with phreatomagmatic activity, and fumaroles were observed in the 16th-18th centuries in the Sierra de Valenzuela territory. Earlier activity has been subdivided in several phases. The first affecting mostly the centre of the field is K-Ar dated between 8.7 and 6.4 Ma. A second phase occurred in the Pleistocene 1.3 Ma and 0.7 Ma. The maars involve both hard-substrate maars formed in metasediments of the basement and soft-substrate maars in Pliocene unconsolidated sediments. Both types of maars are distributed in NE-SW and NW-SE directions following faults established during the Miocene. During the lower Pliocene, the system underwent uplift and erosion. Some maars contain sediments including travertine possibly related to carbon dioxide emissions. Gas emissions, sometimes increased following earthquake activity, are common in the field and include hydrogen sulfide, CO_{2} and water.

== See also ==
- List of volcanic fields
