= Campo de Calatrava =

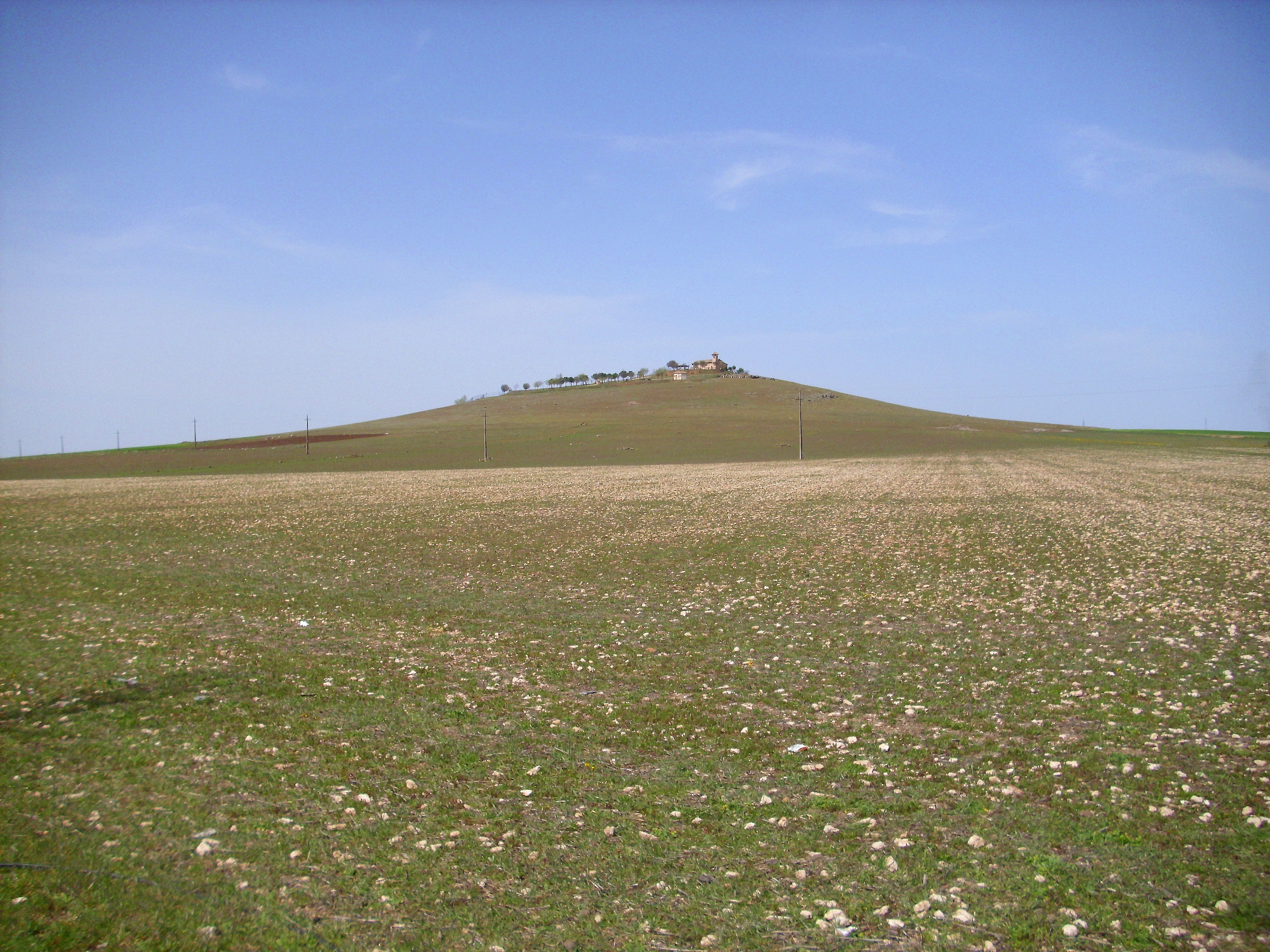
Volcano of Poblete, with an hermitage built on top.

Campo de Calatrava is a comarca in the province of Ciudad Real, Castilla-La Mancha, Spain. Ciudad Real, the provincial capital, belongs to the Campo de Calatrava.

A Denominación de Origen for olive oil takes its name from the comarca. There are olive groves in sixteen of the municipios, mainly containing a cultivar called cornicabra. Vineyards and crops of barley are also common to the area. Saffron is another crop cultivated in the area.

The relief consists of sedimentary plains interspersed by small Appalachian folds, likewise distinctly featuring remains of volcanic activity.

Historically, the area is connected to the Order of Calatrava, founded in 1158 to defend the fortress of Calatrava. Calatrava had passed to Christian control about a decade earlier, in 1147. The Calatravan order lost their stronghold and the entire Campo de Calatrava to Almohads after the 1195 battle of Alarcos. The Campo de Calatrava (with the exception of the fortresses of Dueñas and Salvatierra) was seized by a Christian army on its way south in 1212 in the context of the Battle of Navas de Tolosa. Calatrava was ensuingly returned to the Order of Calatrava, who nonetheless transferred their seat to Calatrava la Nueva towards 1214.

== See also ==
- Campo de Calatrava Volcanic Field
