= Battle of Las Navas de Tolosa =

Part of the Reconquista in Spain (1212)

- Part of the Reconquista
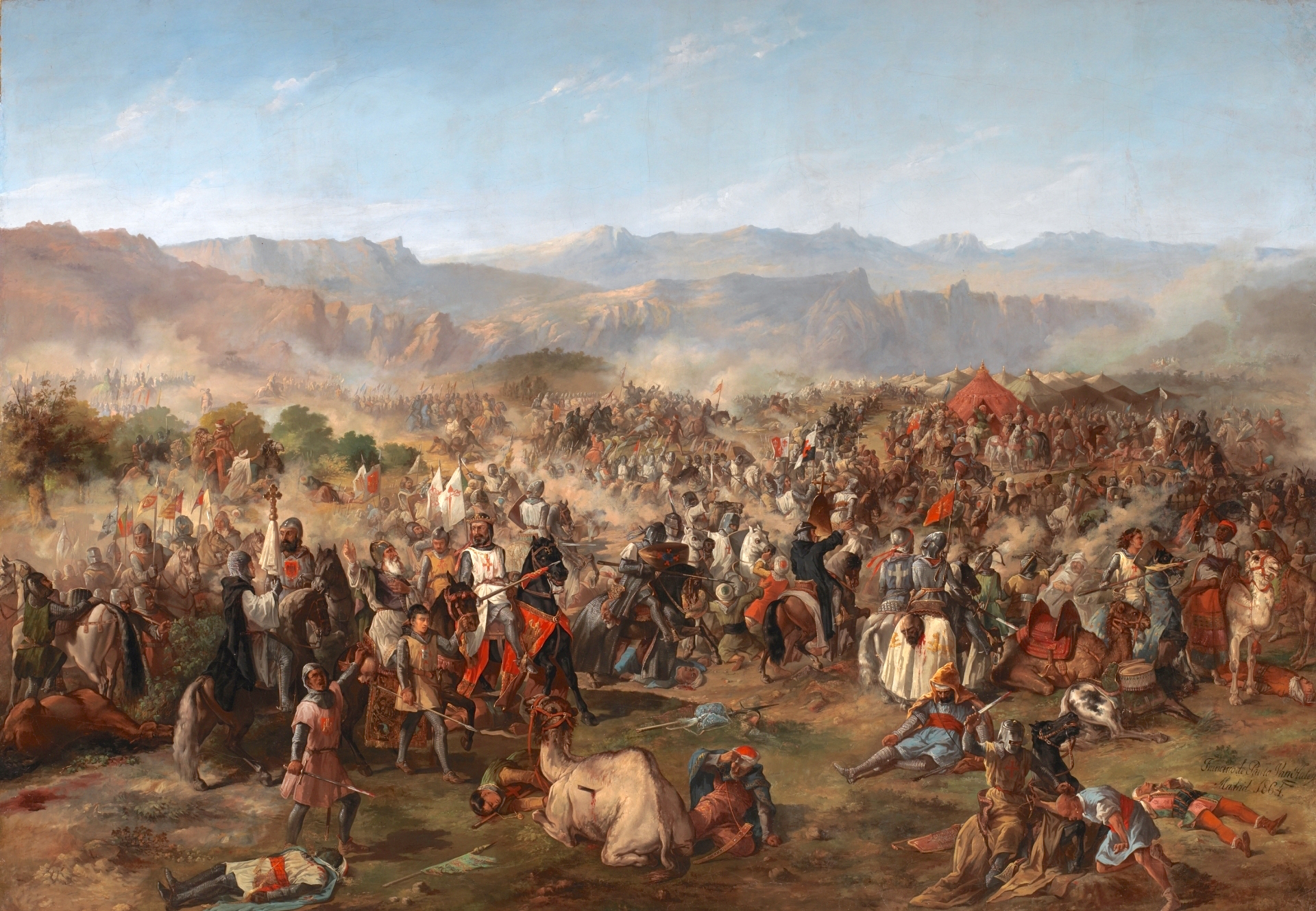
- Portrayal of the battle by Francisco de Paula Van Halen (1864)
Date	16 July 1212
Location	Near Santa Elena, Jaén, Andalusia, 38.28443°N 3.58286°W
Result	Christian victory
Territorial changes	Fall of Ubeda and Baeza

Belligerents
Catholic coalition: Crown of Aragon; Kingdom of Castile; Kingdom of Navarre; Kingdom of Portugal; Knights Templar; Order of Calatrava; Order of Santiago; Crusaders; Leonese volunteers	Almohad Caliphate

Commanders and leaders
Catholic monarchs: Peter II of Aragon; Alfonso VIII of Castile; Sancho VII of Navarre	Muhammad al-Nasir

Strength
12,000–14,000	22,000–30,000 "Many hundreds of thousands"

Casualties and losses
~2,000	Very high; ~20,000

The Battle of Las Navas de Tolosa, known in Islamic history as the Battle of Al-Uqab (Arabic: معركة العقاب), took place on 16 July 1212 and was an important turning point in the Reconquista and the history of medieval Spain. The Christian forces were led by King Alfonso VIII of Castile, joined by his rivals, Kings Sancho VII of Navarre and Peter II of Aragon. The Muslim army was led by caliph al-Nasir (Miramamolín in the Spanish chronicles), ruler of the Almohad Caliphate, which included the southern half of the Iberian Peninsula and Morocco.

Navas de Tolosa (also called Las Navas) is a town and hamlet in southern Spain, in the municipality of La Carolina, in the province of Jaén, in the eastern part of the Sierra Morena region, 15 kilometres (9.3 mi) from the border with the province of Ciudad Real.

== Background ==
In 1195, the Almohads defeated Alfonso VIII of Castile in the Battle of Alarcos. After this battle, the Kingdom of León and the Kingdom of Navarre entered into an alliance with the Almohad ruler Yaqub al-Mansur and attacked Castile in the Castilian–Leonese War (1196–1197). During that war, Yaqub attacked several important Castilian cities including Toledo, Trujillo, Plasencia, Talavera, Cuenca, Guadalajara, Madrid, Uclés, and others. However, Yaqub signed a ten-year truce with Alfonso VIII in 1197.

After the truce expired, Alfonso resumed military action along the frontier, but the Almohads responded fiercely. In 1211, Yaqub's successor, Muhammad al-Nasir brought a powerful army from Morocco, invaded Christian territory, and captured Salvatierra Castle, the stronghold of the knights of the Order of Calatrava. News of the loss spread throughout Christendom, and in late 1211 Alfonso began organizing a major campaign, seeking a major pitched battle with the Almohad Caliph.

The threat to the Hispanic Christian kingdoms was so great that Pope Innocent III called Christian knights to a crusade. This time, the king of Castile was supported by the hosts of king Peter II of Aragon and king Sancho VII of Navarre in person, as well as the various religious orders and volunteers from throughout Europe. Alfonso IX of León stood aloof from the enterprise and took advantage of civil war in Portugal to invade that kingdom on the pretext of assisting his former wife.

Afonso II of Portugal was unable to join the allied kings in person because he was involved in a civil war with his sisters and faced an invasion from León, but nevertheless the Portuguese king still dispatched a contingent of troops to help fight the Almohads. The Portuguese host was composed mainly of town militiamen but also included Templar squadrons as well as other volunteers who joined the expedition, led by the master of the Templars in Iberia, the Portuguese Gomes Ramires.

== Previous movements ==
The final gathering took place in Toledo in May 1212. The Christians headed south mid-June and captured several important castles along the way including Malagon, Calatrava, Alarcos, Caracuel, Benavente and Piedrabuena.

There were some disagreements among the members of the Christian coalition; notably, French and other European knights did not agree with Alfonso's merciful treatment of Jews and Muslims who had been defeated in the conquest of Malagón and Calatrava la Vieja. Previously, they had caused problems in Toledo (where the different armies of the Crusade gathered), with assaults and murders in the Jewish Quarter.

== Battle ==
Alfonso crossed the mountain range that defended the Almohad camp, sneaking through the Despeñaperros Pass, led by Martín Alhaja, a local shepherd who knew the area. On 16 July 1212, the Christian coalition caught the encamped Moorish army by surprise, and Alhaja was granted the hereditary title Cabeza de Vaca for his assistance to Alfonso VIII.

The battle was fought at relatively close range, so that neither the Almohads nor the Spaniards could use archers in the melee-dominated fight. Spanish knights became locked in close-quarter combat, in which they were superior to the Almohads.

"They attacked, fighting against one another, hand-to-hand, with lances, swords, and battle-axes; there was no room for archers. The Christians pressed on." – (The Latin Chronicle of The Kings of Castile)

The Portuguese distinguished themselves in the battle, particularly the commoners of the town militias. The Castilian Rodrigo de Toledo commented that "a number of warriors from the parts of Portugal, a copious multitude of foot-soldiers of wonderful agility, easily sustained the labours of the expedition and attacked with an audacious onset", while Lucas of Tuy wrote that "they rushed into combat as if to a feast." Gomes Ramires however, perished in combat.

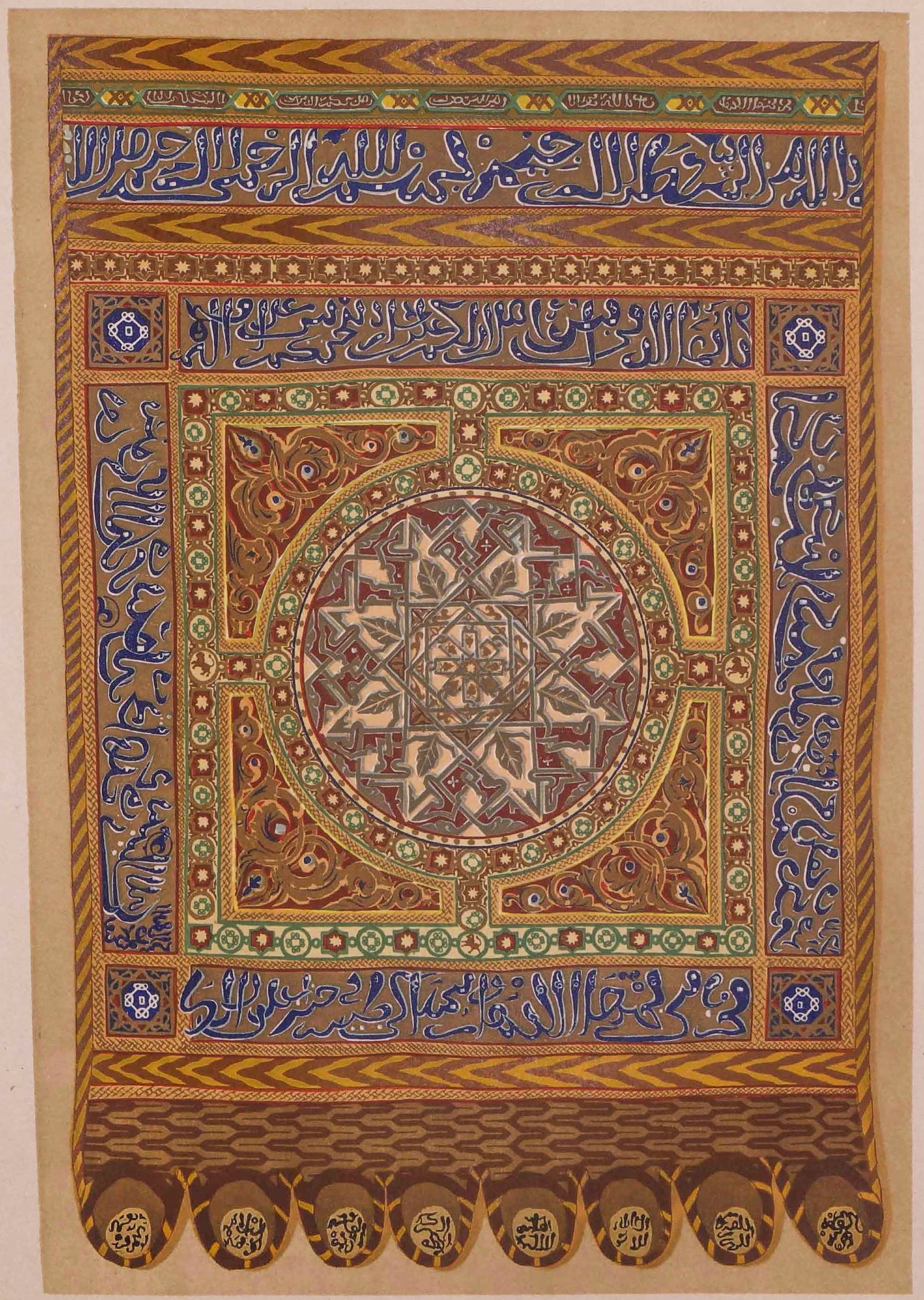
Almohad banner captured at the battle of Navas de Tolosa.

Some of the Spanish knights, namely the Order of Santiago, eventually broke the Almohad line of defense decisively as they inflicted heavy casualties on the Almohads and established a breakthrough with gaps appearing in the enemy lines. This led to a possible spearhead. King Sancho VII then led his mounted knights through the gaps, exploiting them, and charged at the Caliph's tent.

The Caliph had surrounded his tent with a bodyguard of black slave-warriors. Though it was once claimed that these men were chained together to prevent flight, it is considered more likely that this results from a mistranslation of the word "serried", meaning a densely packed formation. The Navarrese force led by their king Sancho VII broke through this bodyguard. The Caliph escaped, but the Moors were routed, leaving heavy casualties on the battlefield. (Note: According to the king of Castile, "On their side 100,000 armed men fell in battle...") The victorious Christians seized several prizes of war; Muhammad al-Nasir's tent and standard were delivered to Pope Innocent III.

Christian losses were far fewer, only about 2,000 men (though not so few as legend had it). The losses were particularly notable among the Orders: those killed included Pedro Gómez de Acevedo (bannerman of the Order of Calatrava), Alvaro Fernández de Valladares (comendator of the Order of Santiago), Pedro Arias (master of the Order of Santiago, died of wounds on 3 August), and Gomes Ramires (Portuguese master of the Knights Templar and simultaneously master of Leon, Castile, and Portugal); Ruy Díaz (master of the Order of Calatrava) was so grievously wounded that he had to resign his command.

Muhammad al-Nasir never recovered from the defeat of this battle: he went to Marrakesh and locked himself in his palace until his death a year later.

== Aftermath ==
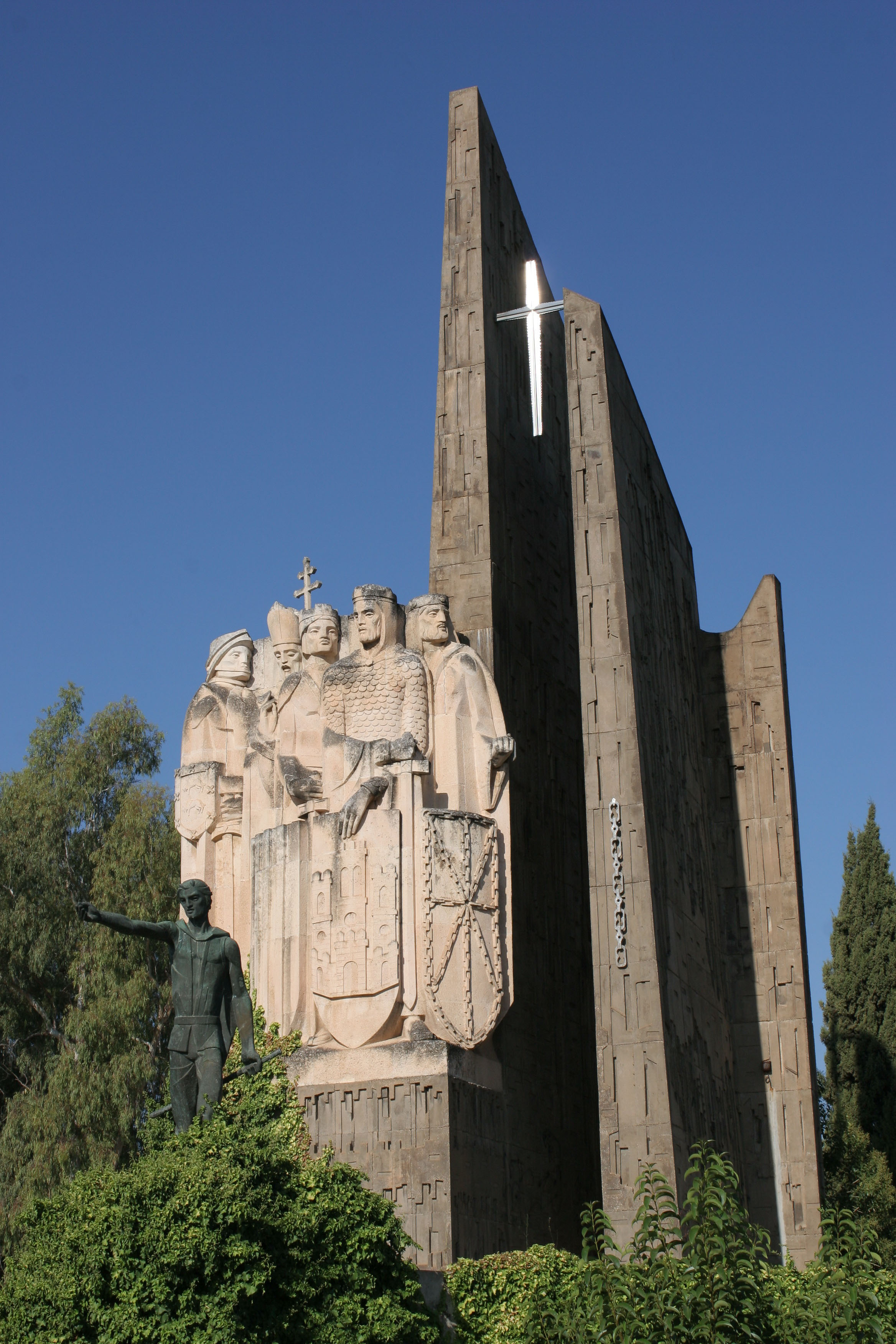
Monument at Navas De Tolosa (1881)

The crushing defeat of the Almohads significantly hastened their decline both in the Iberian Peninsula and in the Maghreb a decade later. That gave further impulse to the Christian Reconquest and sharply reduced the already declining power of the Moors in Iberia. Shortly after the battle, the Castilians took Baeza and then conquered Úbeda, major fortified cities near the battlefield and gateways to invade Andalusia. According to a letter from Alfonso VIII of Castile to Pope Innocent III, Baeza was evacuated and its people moved to Úbeda; Alfonso laid siege, killing 60,000 Muslims and enslaving many more. According to the Latin Chronicle of Kings of Castile the number given is almost 100,000 Saracens, including children and women, who were captured.

Thereafter, Alfonso VIII's grandson Ferdinand III of Castile took Córdoba in 1236, Jaén in 1246, and Seville in 1248; then he took Arcos, Medina-Sidonia, Jerez, and Cádiz. In 1252, Ferdinand was preparing his fleet and army for invasion of the Almohad lands in Africa, but he died in Seville on 30 May 1252, during an outbreak of plague in southern Hispania; only his death prevented the Castilians from taking the war to the Almohad on the Mediterranean coast. James I of Aragon conquered the Balearic Islands (from 1228 to 1232) and Valencia (the city capitulated on 28 September 1238).

By 1252 the Almohad empire was almost finished, at the mercy of another emerging Berber power. In 1269 a new association of Berber tribes, the Marinids, took control of present-day Morocco. Later, the Marinids tried to recover the former Almohad territories in Iberia, but they were definitively defeated by Alfonso XI of Castile and Afonso IV of Portugal in the Battle of Río Salado, the last major military encounter between large Christian and Muslim armies in Hispania. So, the battle of Las Navas de Tolosa seems to have been a true turning point in the history of the region, including the western Mediterranean sea.

=== Moorish Granada ===
In 1292 Sancho IV took Tarifa, key to the control of the Strait of Gibraltar. Granada, Almería, and Málaga were the only major Muslim cities remaining in the Iberian peninsula. These three cities were the core of the Emirate of Granada, ruled by the Nasrid dynasty. Granada was a vassal state of Castile, until finally taken by the Catholic Monarchs in 1492.

=== In fiction ===
Harry Harrison's 1972 alternate history/science fiction novel Tunnel Through the Deeps depicts a history where the Moors won at Las Navas de Tolosa and retained part of Spain into the 20th century.

S.J.A Turney describes the battle in his historic novel The Crescent and the Cross.

== See also ==
- Portugal in the Reconquista
- Almohad wars in the Iberian Peninsula
