= Martín López de Pisuerga =

Martín López de Pisuerga (died 28 September 1208) was the archbishop of Toledo from 1192 until his death.

Martín was born near Valladolid in the diocese of Palencia. His family were burghers. Prior to his election as archbishop, he was an archdeacon in his native diocese from at least 1173.

Martín's predecessor, Gonzalo Pérez, died on 30 August 1191. As he is attested as archbishop from early 1192, Martín was probably elected late in 1191. The election of a clergyman from another diocese who was not even a priest to the highest ecclesiastical dignity in the Kingdom of Castile was highly unusual. King Alfonso VIII wrote to the pope requesting its confirmation using language which suggests that the election was arranged by the king.

As archbishop, Martín was a close ally of Alfonso VIII. In the spring of 1192, he travelled to Rome, where he received consecration and the pallium from the hands of Pope Celestine III, who confirmed that the archbishop of Toledo was the primate of Spain. In 1194, according to Rodrigo Jiménez de Rada, Martín led troops on a successful raid into Almohad territory, apparently at the request of the king, who intended it as a declaration of war. The Caliph Abū Yūsuf crossed to Spain the following year and inflicted a major defeat on Alfonso at the battle of Alarcos. Martín's support of an aggressive posture towards the Almohads was matched by his advocacy of concord between the Christian kings of Castile, León and Navarre. He unsuccessfully championed the marriage of Alfonso VIII's daughter, Berenguela, and King Alfonso IX of León, which the pope rejected.

Martín pioneered the use of the Ibero-Romance vernacular in official documents in preference to Latin. In 1198, he granted a new constitution (fueros) to Belinchón, a town under archiepiscopal lordship. He supported the creation of the diocese of Albarracín (1200) and consecrated his archdeacon, Julian, as the bishop of Cuenca. He reformed the cathedral chapter in Toledo and during his episcopate the title of prior for the head of the chapter was replaced by that of dean.

In 1203, Martín signed an agreement with John of Matha for the foundation of the hospital that became the Hospitalito del Rey. In 1206, he became the first archbishop named chancellor of Castile. He died on 28 September 1208. He was succeeded by Rodrigo Jiménez de Rada.

== Bibliography ==
- Ayala Martínez, Carlos de (2012). "Breve semblanza de un obispo de Toledo en tiempo de cruzada: Martín López de Pisuerga". In Beatriz Arízaga Bolumburu (ed.). Mundos medievales: espacios, sociedades y poder. Homenaje al profesor José Ángel García de Cortázar y Ruiz de Aguirre. Vol. 1. Universidad de Cantabria. pp. 355–362.
- Ayala Martínez, Carlos de (2019). "Holy War and Crusade during the Reign of Alfonso VIII". In Miguel Gómez; Damian Smith; Kyle C. Lincoln (eds.). King Alfonso VIII of Castile: Government, Family, and War. Fordham University Press. pp. 118–142.
- Gonzálvez Ruiz, Ramón [in Spanish] (2018). "López de Pisuerga, Martín". Diccionario biográfico español. Real Academia de la Historia.
- Lincoln, Kyle C. (2016). The Episcopate in the Kingdom of Castile during the Reign of Alfonso VIII (r. 1158–1214) (PhD diss.). Saint Louis University.
- Lincoln, Kyle C. (2018). "An Archbishop and His Cavalry". Medieval Warfare. 8 (5): 42–45. JSTOR 48596798.
- Lincoln, Kyle C. (2019). "A Prosopography of the Castilian Episcopate in the Reign of Alfonso VIII". In Miguel Gómez; Damian Smith; Kyle C. Lincoln (eds.). King Alfonso VIII of Castile: Government, Family, and War. Fordham University Press. pp. 204–220.
- Rivera Recio, Juan Francisco (1966). La iglesia de Toledo en el siglo XII (1085–1208). Vol. 1. Instituto español de Historia eclesiástica.
- Wright, Roger (2010). "Bilingualism and Diglossia in Medieval Iberia (350–1350)". In Fernando Cabo Aseguinolaza; Anxo Abuín Gonzalez; César Domínguez (eds.). A Comparative History of Literatures in the Iberian Peninsula. John Benjamins. pp. 333–350.
