= Poblete =

- Municipality
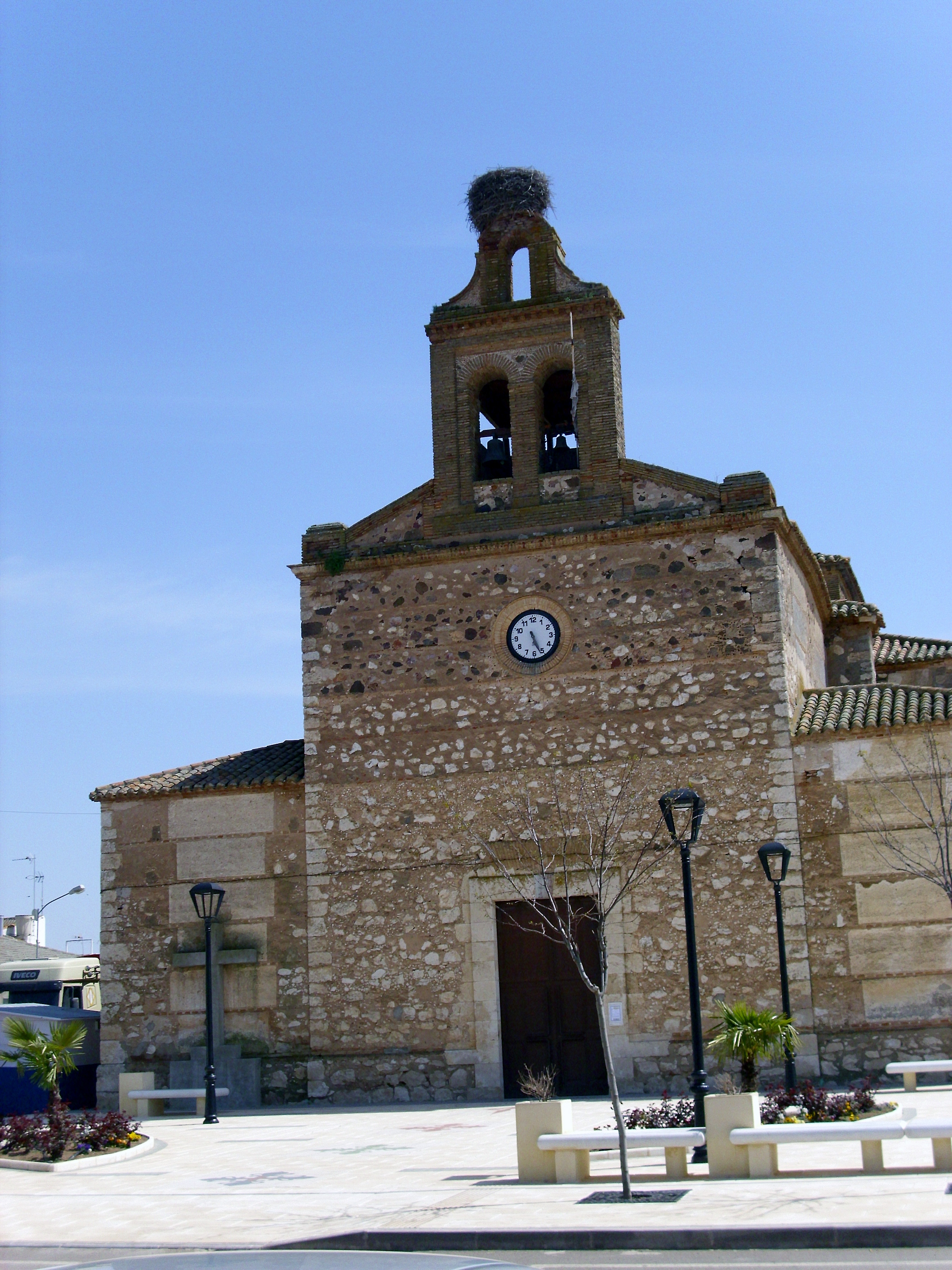
- Poblete's Church

- Flag Coat of arms

- Location within Spain
- Coordinates: 38°56′07.4″N 3°58′52.5″W
- Country: Spain
- A. Community: Castilla-La Mancha
- Province: Ciudad Real

Government
  - Mayor: Luis Alberto Lara

Area
  - Total: 27.93 km^{2} (10.78 sq mi)

Population (January 1, 2021)
  - Total: 2,746
  - Density: 98.32/km^{2} (254.6/sq mi)
- Time zone: UTC+01:00 (CET)
- Postal code: 13195
- Area code: 13064
- Website: Official website

Poblete is a municipality in Ciudad Real, Castile-La Mancha, Spain. As of 2021 it has a population of 2,746.
