= Alarcos =

Coordinates: 38°57′19″N 4°00′48″W

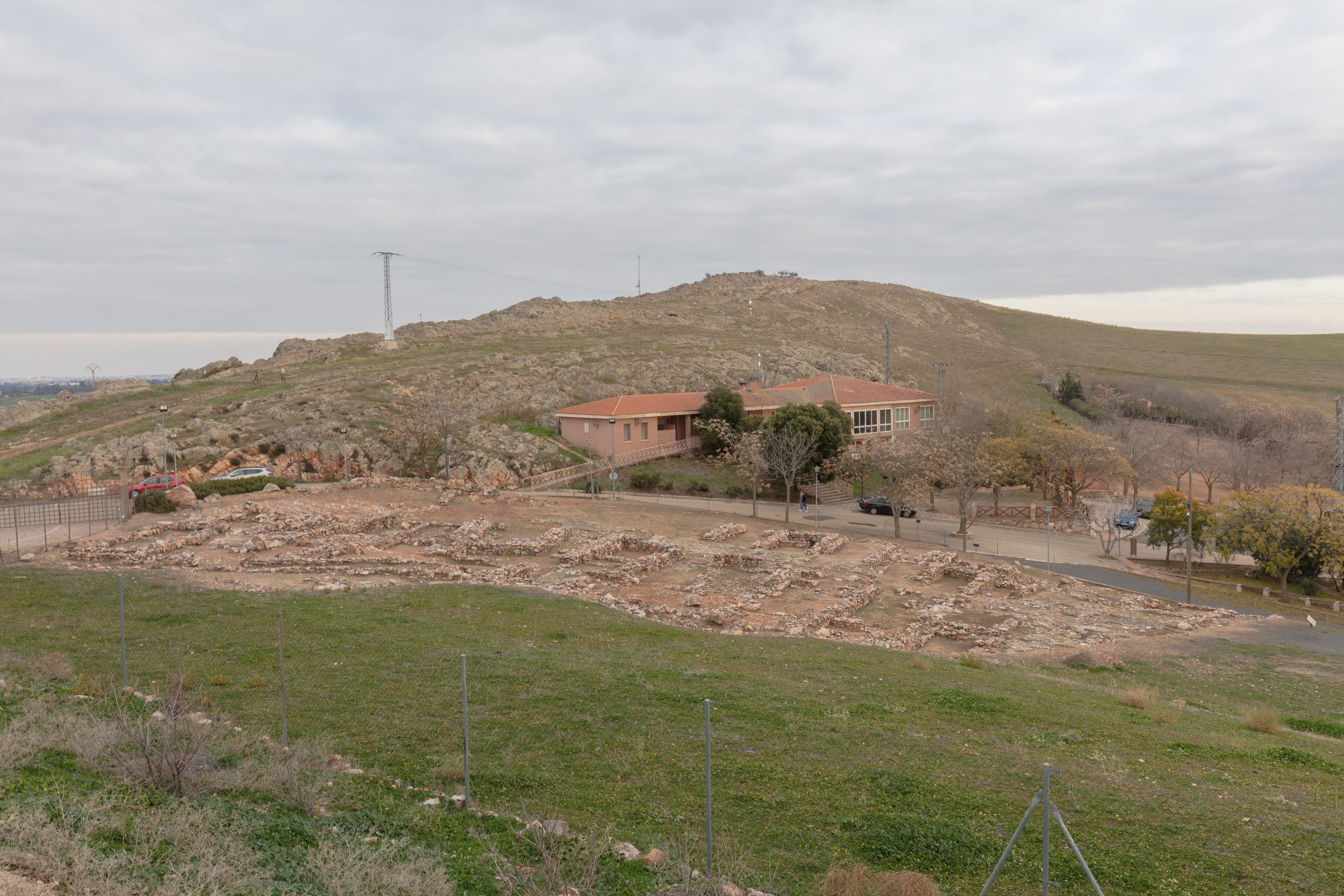

Alarcos is a small hill and archaeological site located in the Campo de Calatrava region of the Iberian Peninsula. Standing at 675 metres above mean sea level, the hill is made of quartzite rocks together with lithic components of volcanic origin, and the Guadiana river flows next to it. It features an archaeological site on top, in between the Spanish municipalities of Poblete and Ciudad Real. The archaeological site features a Bronze/Iron Age Iberian oppidum, as well as a phase of medieval occupation, which includes the Castle of Alarcos. The site was declared Bien de Interés Cultural in 1992.

== Bibliography ==
- Fernández Rodríguez, Macarena; Juan García, Antonio de (2017). "El Parque Arqueológico de Alarcos (Ciudad Real)" (PDF). Boletín del Museo Arqueológico Nacional. 35. Madrid: Museo Arqueológico Nacional: 901−904. ISSN 2341-3409.
- García Huerta, Rosario; Morales Hervás, Francisco Javier; Rodríguez González, David (2020). El cerro de Alarcos (Ciudad Real): Formación y desarrollo de un Oppidum Ibérico: 20 años de excavaciones arqueológicas en el Sector III (PDF). United Kingdom: Archaeopress. ISBN 978-1-78969-692-9.
