= Pozuelo de Tábara =

Coordinates: 41°47′N 5°53′W

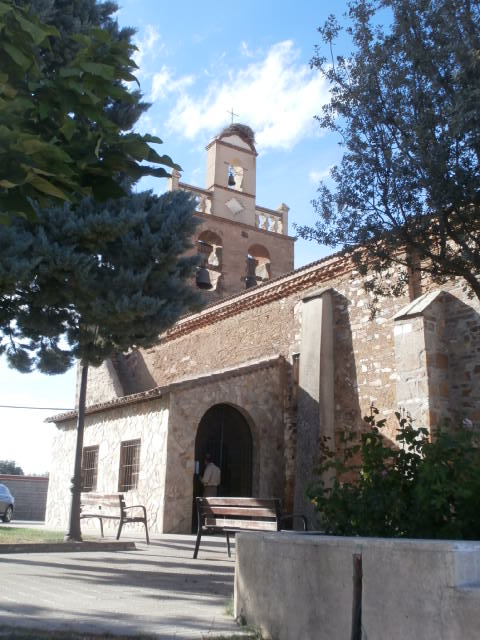
- Interactive map of Pozuelo de Tábara
- Country: Spain
- Autonomous community: Castile and León
- Province: Zamora
- Municipality: Pozuelo de Tábara

Area
  - Total: 25 km^{2} (9.7 sq mi)

Population (2025-01-01)
  - Total: 150
  - Density: 6.0/km^{2} (16/sq mi)
- Time zone: UTC+1 (CET)
  - Summer (DST): UTC+2 (CEST)

Pozuelo de Tábara is a municipality located in the province of Zamora, Castile and León, Spain. According to the 2004 census (INE), the municipality has a population of 213 inhabitants. Although it may have changed by now.
