= Calatrava la Nueva =

Castle in Calzada de Calatrava, Spain

Coordinates: 38.6663°N 3.8452°W

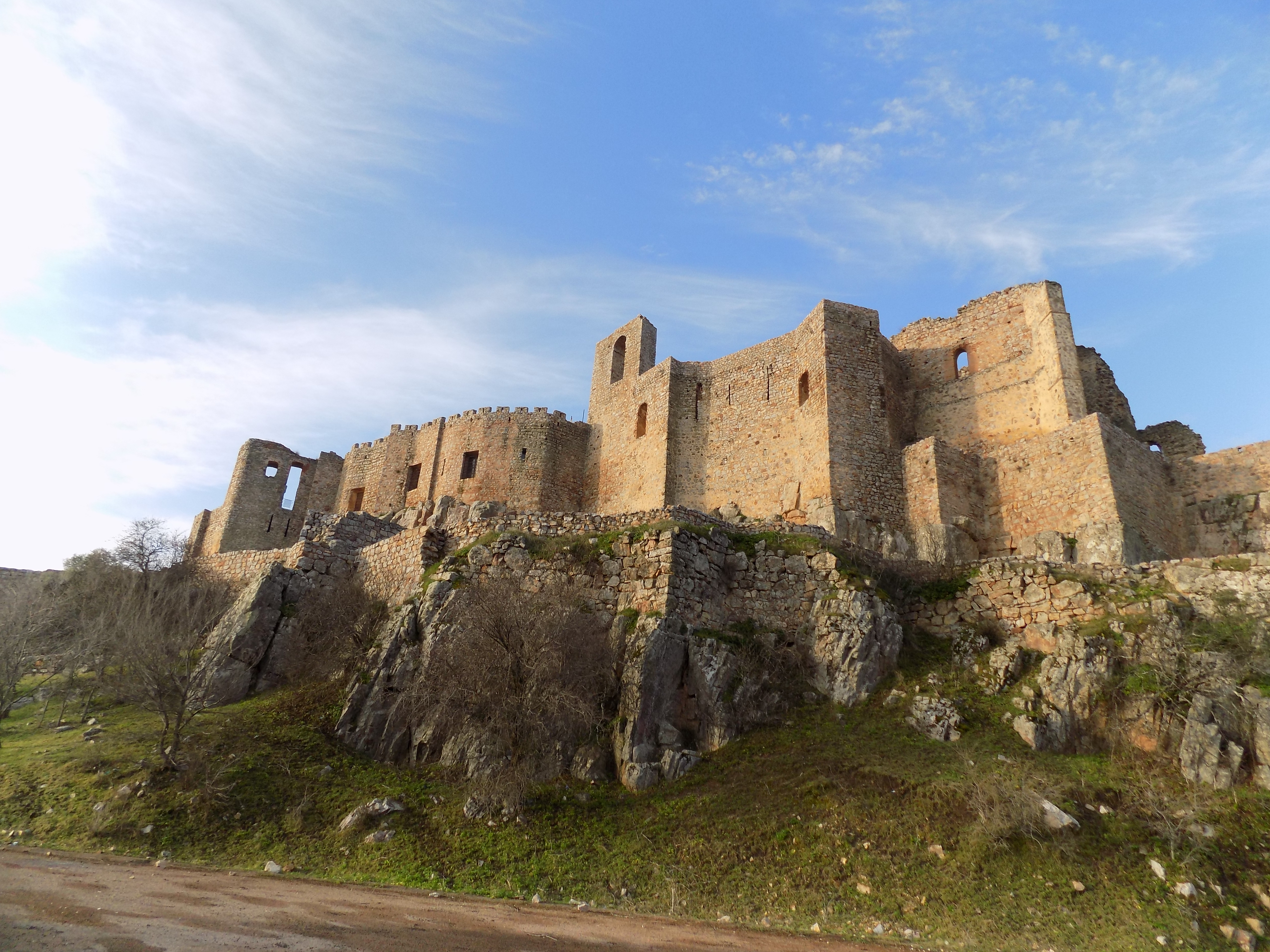
Calatrava la Nueva

Calatrava la Nueva (Sacro convento-castillo de Calatrava la Nueva) is a medieval castle and convent found on the peak of Alacranejo, within the municipality of Aldea del Rey, near Almagro, in the province of Ciudad Real, Spain.

Its name is a reference to the Order of Calatrava, which was originally situated in Calatrava la Vieja, 60 km to the north. In 1217, the Order of Calatrava moved to Calatrava la Nueva. Thus, the original site became known as Calatrava la Vieja ("Old Calatrava") and the new site as Calatrava la Nueva ("New Calatrava").

== Burials ==
- Alfonso of Molina

== Gallery ==
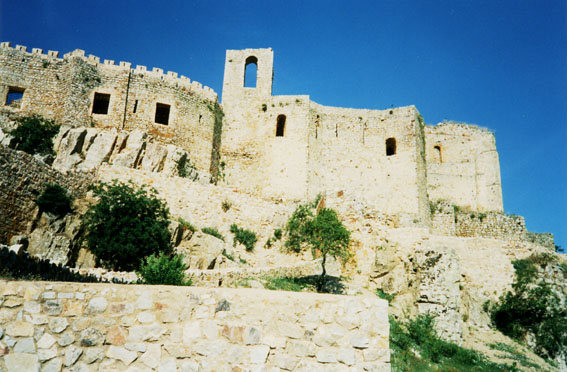

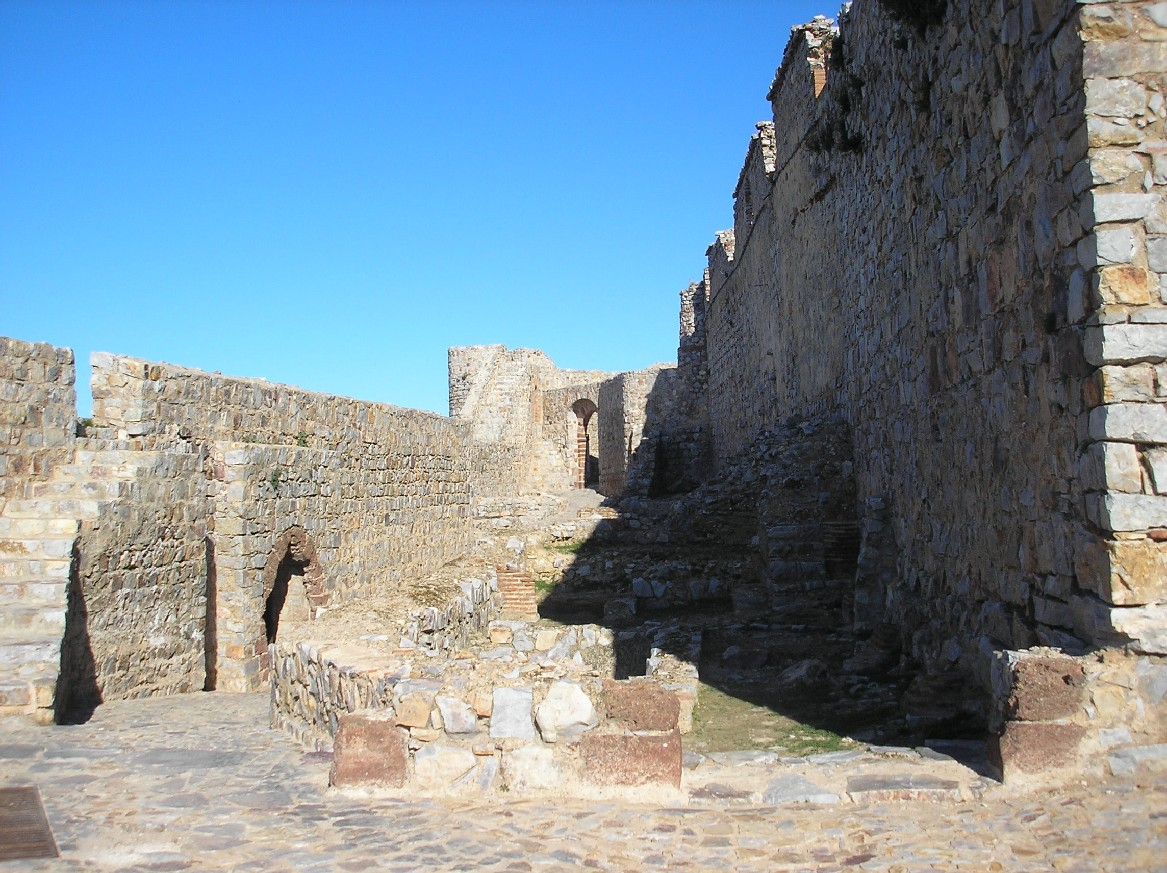

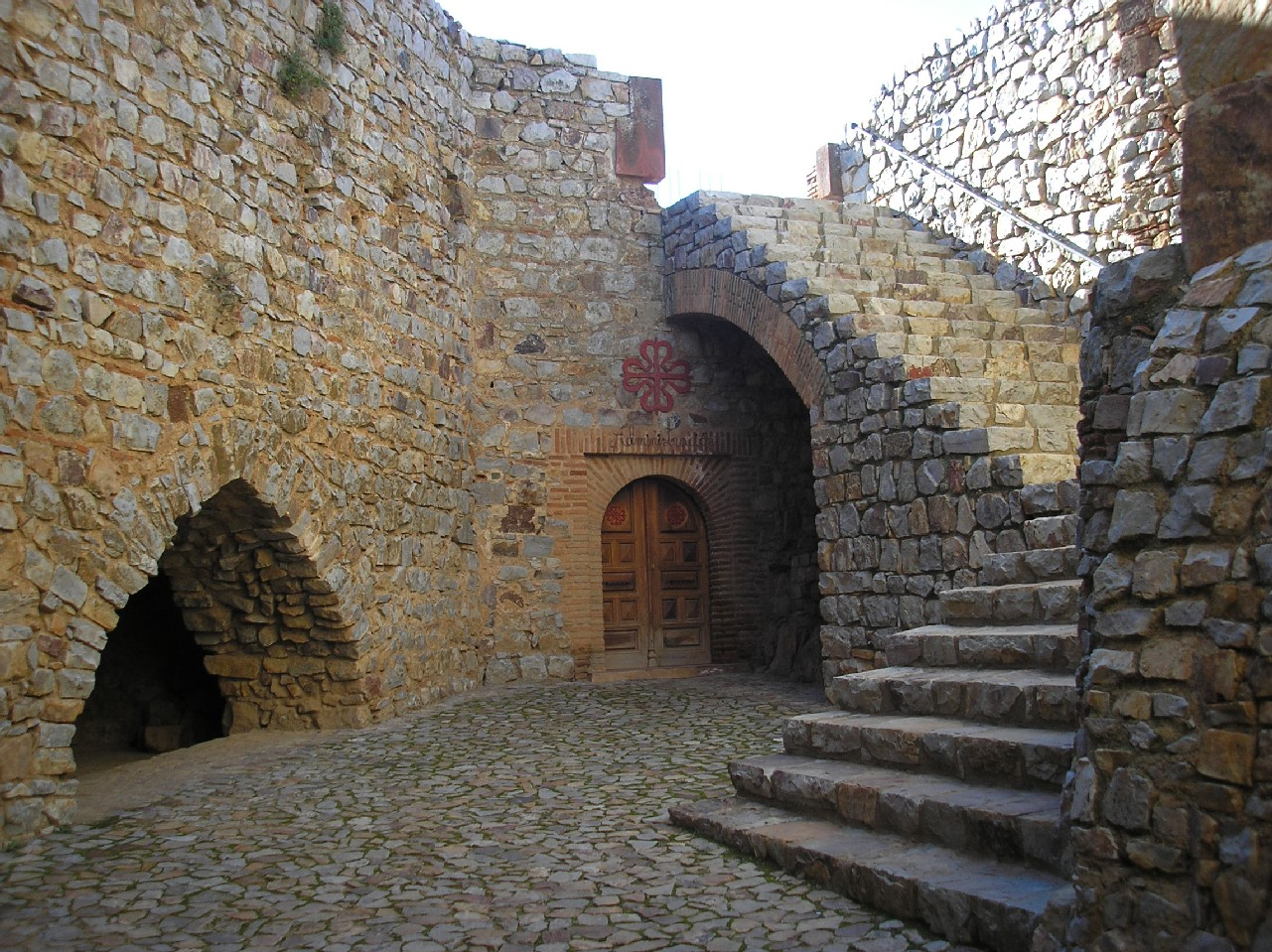

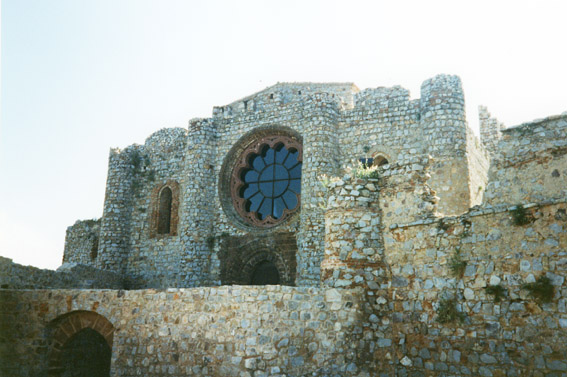
Church of the castle

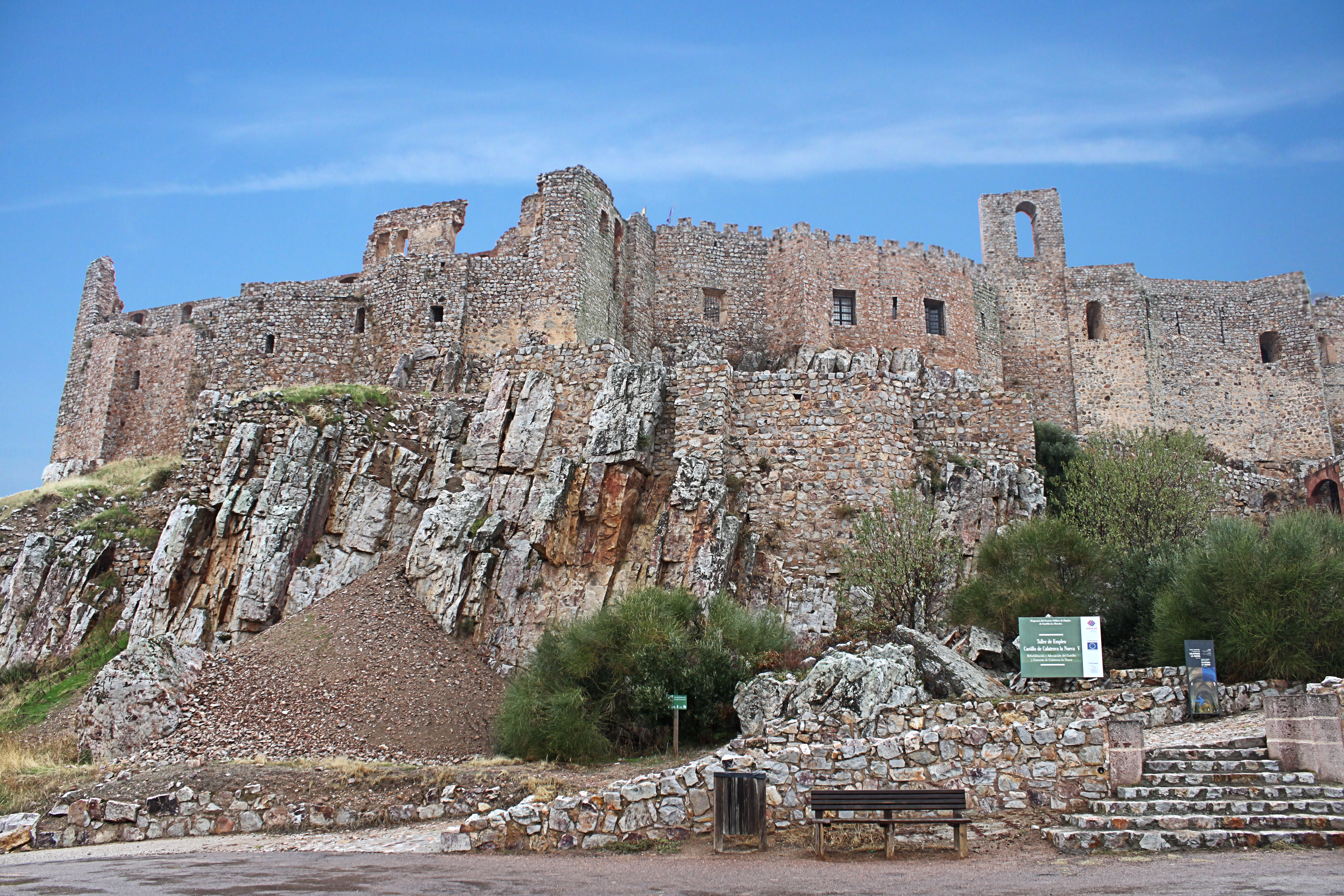
