= Alvaro Fernández de Valladares =

Spanish soldier

Alvaro Fernández de Valladares was the Commandant of the Order of Santiago also known as "Military Order of St. James of the Sword" which was established in the 12th century in Leon-Castile, in honor of the Patron of Galicia (St. James the Greater) and subsequently all of Spain, and he died fighting in the Reconquista Battle of Las Navas de Tolosa in 1212, in the battle that Christian troops gave a crushing defeat to the Muslims-Almohads and mark their decline in Spain. Alvaro Fernandez de Valladares married Leonor Varela.
