= Malagón =

- Municipality
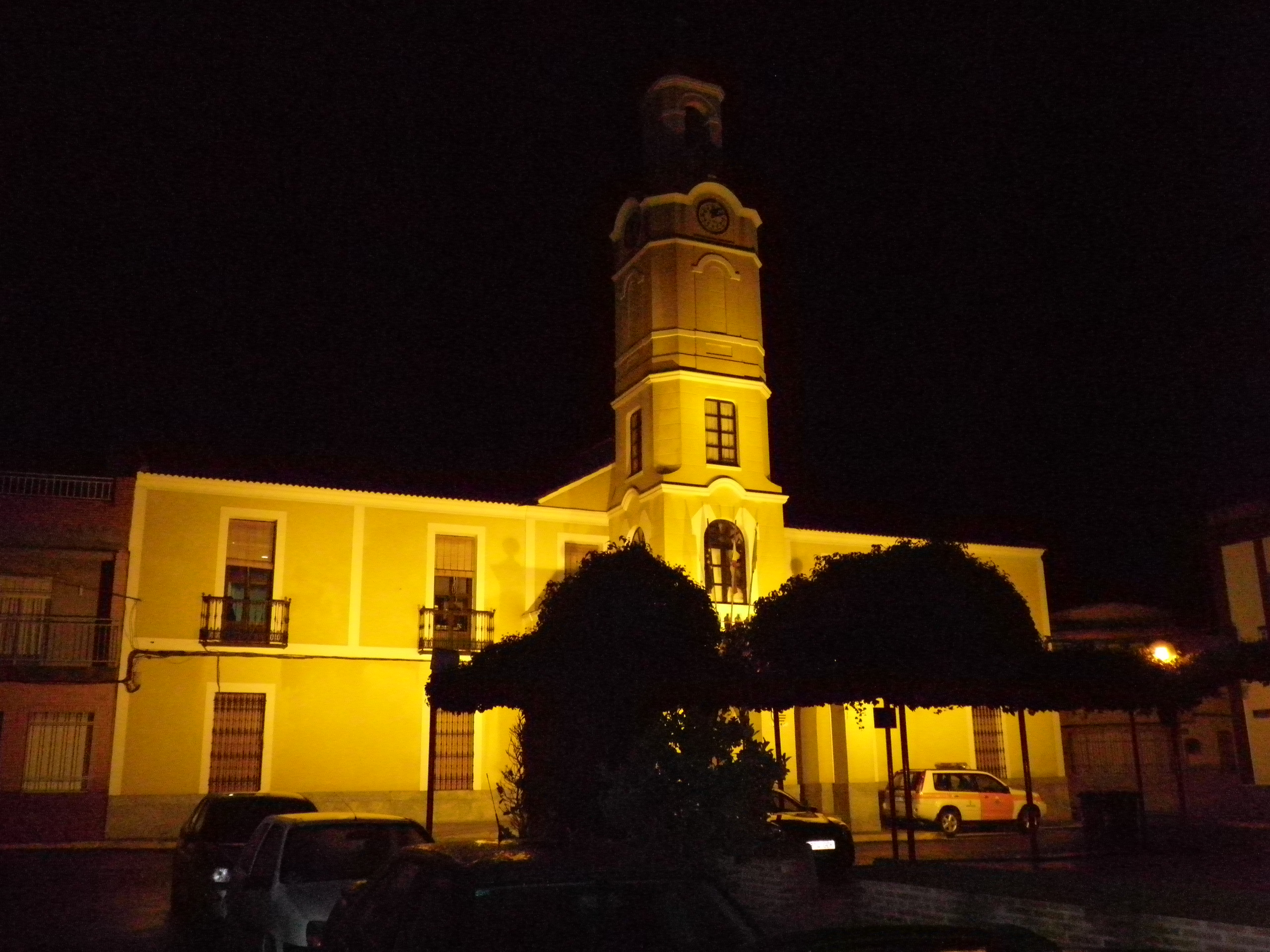
- Town Hall.

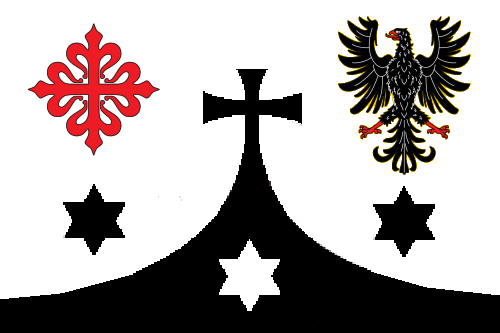
- Flag Coat of arms

- Location in Spain
- Coordinates: 39°11′N 3°52′W
- Country: Spain
- Autonomous community: Castile-La Mancha
- Province: Ciudad Real
- Comarca: Montes Norte

Government
  - Mayor: Adrián Fernández Herguido

Area
  - Total: 365 km^{2} (141 sq mi)
- Elevation: 646 m (2,119 ft)

Population (2025-01-01)
  - Total: 7,827
  - Density: 21.4/km^{2} (55.5/sq mi)
- Demonym: Malagoneros
- Time zone: UTC+1 (CET)
  - Summer (DST): UTC+2 (CEST)
- Postal code: 13420
- Website: Official website

Malagón is a municipality of Spain in the Province of Ciudad Real in the autonomous community of Castilla–La Mancha. The municipality has a population of 7,754 inhabitants (INE 2024).

== Geography ==
Malagón is located in the northern sector of the Province of Ciudad Real. It is surrounded by a large plain interrupted to the northwest by the mountain range of Malagón, belonging to the Montes de Toledo. The Bañuelos River, a tributary of the Guadiana, runs through its municipality.

== History ==
The settlements in the Malagón area are very ancient, dating back to Prehistory (some archaeological evidence dates it to the Lower Paleolithic), highlighting the site of "La Cruz de El Cristo" (The Cross of Christ), considered the most important visigothic necropolis in the province. In the urban center, remains from the Bronze Age, particularly from the Iberian, Roman, and Islamic cultures, have been discovered on the site of the vanished castle.

Malagón, a crossroads and strategic point of access to the Guadiana and Calatrava la Vieja, was an enclave of the Royal Way of La Plata that connected Toledo to Córdoba and served as a detour for travelers on their way to Granada via Almagro.

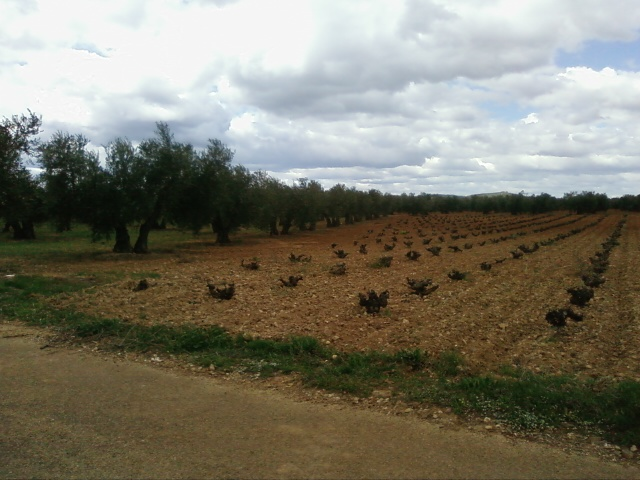
Vineyards and olive trees in the fields of Malagón

Since the end of the 12th century, Malagón was a commandery of the Order of Calatrava, a situation that lasted until the middle of the 16th century, when, after becoming property of the Crown and being named Lordship of Malagón, it was sold by King Charles I to D. Antonio Ares Pardo, Marshal of Castile. This change in the situation of the neighbors gave rise to disputes between the Lord and the neighbors that were resolved with the signing of the Act of Concord in 1552, which gave rise to the legal peculiarity currently enjoyed by the famous "Estados del Duque" (States of the Duke).

== Economy ==
Malagón has a primarily agricultural economy, with vineyards and olive groves. Its cheese and wine industries stand out.
