= Calatrava la Vieja =

Castle in Spain

Coordinates: 39.074°N 3.835°W

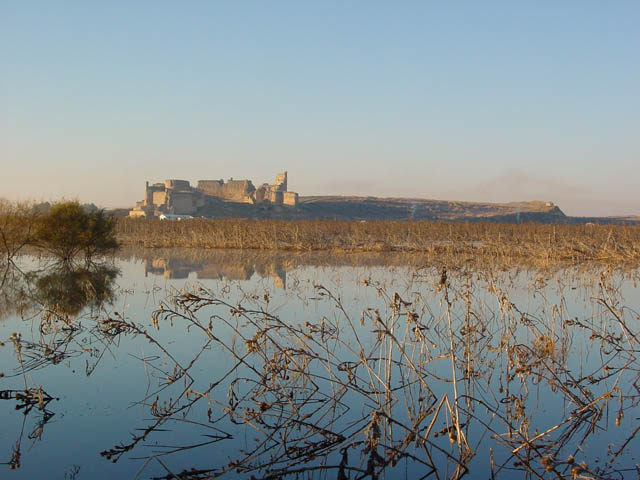
Calatrava la Vieja as seen from the north

Calatrava la Vieja (formerly just Calatrava) is a medieval site and original nucleus of the Order of Calatrava. It is now part of the Archaeological Parks (Parques Arqueológicos) of the Community of Castile-La Mancha. Situated at Carrión de Calatrava, Calatrava during the High Middle Ages was the only important city in the Guadiana River valley. It thus guarded the roads to Cordova and Toledo.

Its name is derived from the (Arabic: قلعة رباح, romanized: Qalʿat Rabāḥ, lit. 'Fortress of Rabah'), a reference to the Arab nobleman who held this area in the 8th century, although as a fortress it may date even earlier – to Iberian times.

References to the site date from as early as 785, and in 853 owing to conflicts between the Muslims of Toledo and the emirate of Cordova, it was partially destroyed, but rebuilt later. The site was rebuilt under al-Hakam (son of Abd ar-Rahman II), brother of Muhammad I. It became the capital of the region. At the fall of the Caliphate of Cordova, the Taifa kingdoms or republics of Seville, Cordova, and Toledo competed to acquire Calatrava.

Toledo was conquered by Alfonso VI of Castile in 1085, and the Almoravids arrived in the Iberian Peninsula a year later. In 1147, Calatrava was conquered by Alfonso VII, becoming one of the farthest Christian outposts during this stage of the invasions.

The castle was placed under the protection of the Knights Templar, but this proved unsatisfactory, and Sancho III of Castile made an offer: he would grant the town and fortress of Calatrava to anyone who promised to defend it from the Moors. Encouraged by a friar named Diego Velásquez, who had been a warrior before becoming a friar, Saint Raymond of Fitero took up the challenge. Sancho granted them the privilege of defending Calatrava, and Raymond organized an army, with the support of Juan II of Toledo, the Archbishop of Toledo, that successfully prevented the Moors from attacking this place in 1158.

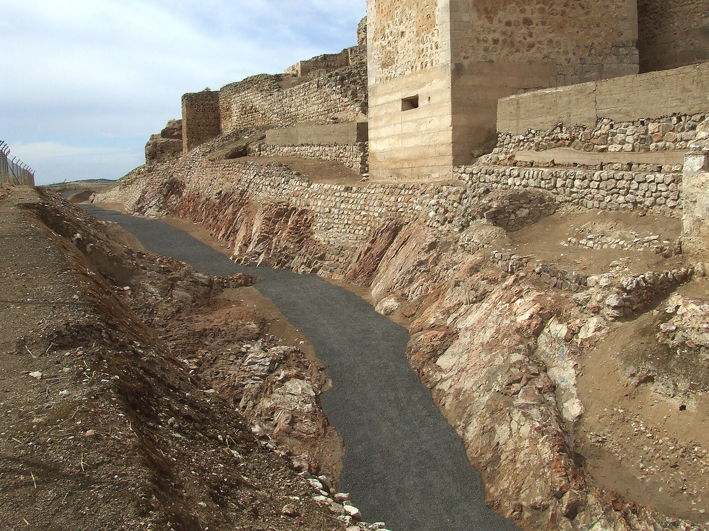
Guadiana river over the castle.

As a result of this success, Raymond decided to found the Order of Calatrava, organized along Cistercian lines.

The city was reconquered by the Almohads in 1195, after their victory against Alfonso VIII at the Battle of Alarcos. They held it for 17 years, until 1212, when it was recovered as part of the campaign that resulted in the decisive Battle of Las Navas de Tolosa: after conquering Calatrava, there were some disagreements among the members of the Christian coalition: French and other European knights were not used to the summer heat, but more importantly, they did not agree with Alfonso VIII´s order of humane treatment of Jews and Muslims. Previously, they had created problems in Toledo, (where the different armies of the Crusade gathered), with assaults and murders in the Jewish Quarter. So, more than 30,000 men deserted and crossed back over the Pyrenees.

In 1217, the Order of Calatrava moved to Calatrava la Nueva (castle of Dueñas), 60 km to the south. Thus, the original site became known as "Calatrava la Vieja" ("Old Calatrava").

Calatrava la Vieja remained the center of the royal land grant, but it was completely abandoned by the early fifteenth century, when the Knight Commander of Calatrava moved his residence to Carrión de Calatrava.
