= List of municipalities in Ciudad Real =

Town in the province of Spain

Map of Spain with the province of Ciudad Real highlighted

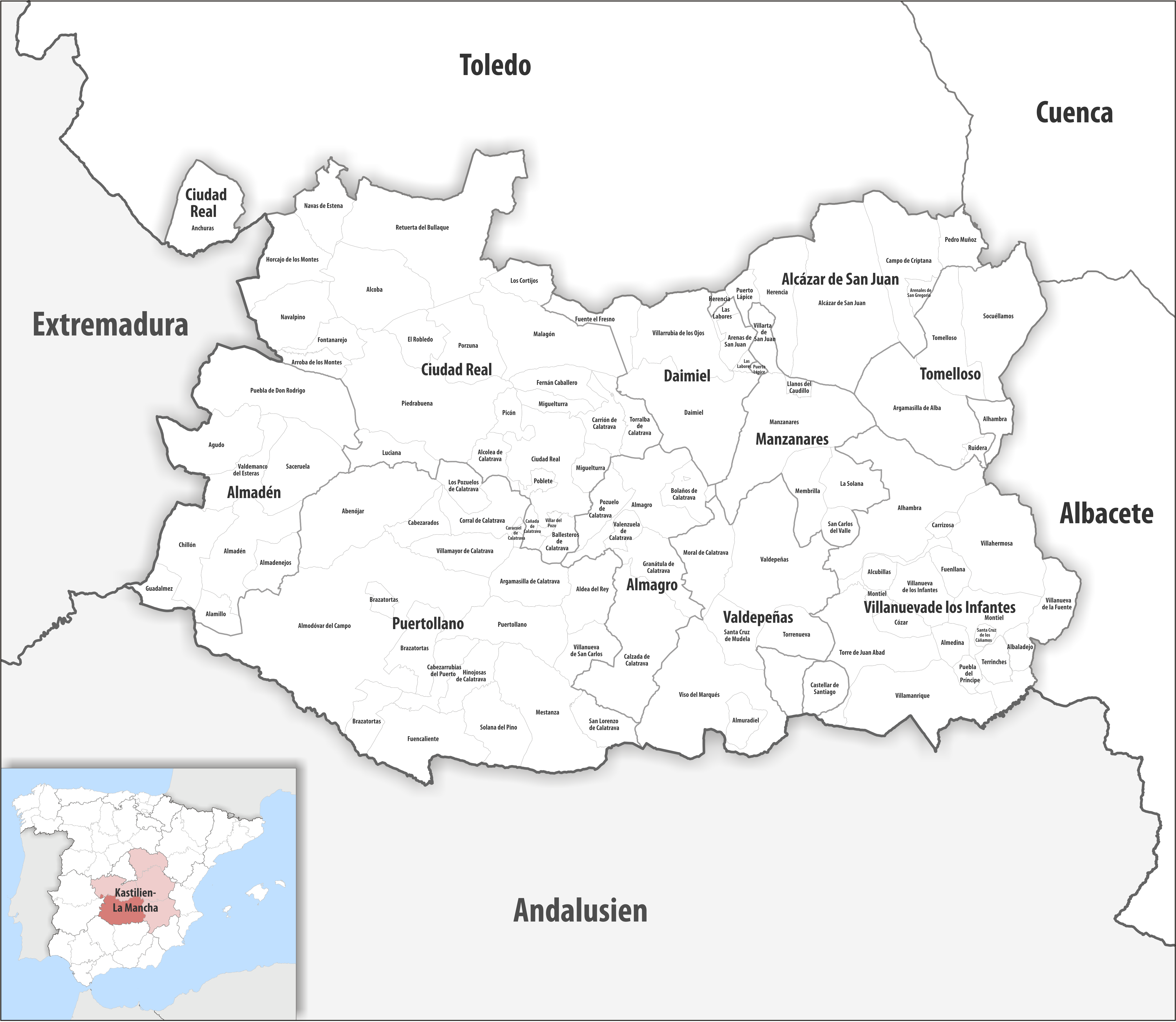
Map of the municipalities in the province of Ciudad Real

Ciudad Real is a province in the autonomous community of Castilla–La Mancha, Spain. The province is divided into 102 municipalities. As of the 2023 Spanish census, Ciudad Real is the 31st most populous of Spain's 50 provinces, with 491,927 inhabitants, and the 3rd largest by land area, spanning 19,813 square kilometres (7,650 sq mi). Municipalities are the most basic local political division in Spain and can only belong to one province. They enjoy a large degree of autonomy in their local administration, being in charge of tasks such as urban planning, water supply, lighting, roads, local police, and firefighting.

The organisation of municipalities in Spain is outlined by the local government law Ley 7/1985, de 2 de abril, Reguladora de las Bases del Régimen Local (transl. Law 7/1985, of 2 April, Regulating the Bases of the Local Administration), which was passed by the Cortes Generales—Spain’s national parliament—on 2 April 1985 and finalised by royal decree on 18 April 1986. Municipalities in Ciudad Real are also governed by the Statute of Autonomy of Castilla-La Mancha, which includes provisions concerning their relations with Castilla–La Mancha's autonomous government. All citizens of Spain are required to register in the municipality in which they reside. Each municipality is a corporation (Note: Within the context of local government in Spain, a corporation is a legal entity representing a municipality. Each municipality is empowered to govern over a specific piece of land and its population.) with independent legal personhood: its governing body is called the ayuntamiento (municipal council or corporation), a term often also used to refer to the municipal offices (city and town halls). The ayuntamiento is composed of the mayor (Spanish: alcalde), the deputy mayors (tenientes de alcalde) and the councillors (concejales), who form the plenary (pleno), the deliberative body. Municipalities are categorised by population for determining the number of councillors: three when the population is up to 100 inhabitants, five for 101–250, seven for 251–1,000, nine for 1,001–2,000, eleven for 2,001–5,000, thirteen for 5,001–10,000, seventeen for 10,001–20,000, twenty-one for 20,001–50,000, and twenty-five for 50,001–100,000.

The mayor and the deputy mayors are elected by the plenary assembly, which is itself elected by universal suffrage. Elections in municipalities with more than 250 inhabitants are carried out following a proportional representation system with closed lists, whilst those with a population lower than 250 use a block plurality voting system with open lists. The plenary assembly must meet periodically, with meetings occurring more or less frequently depending on the population of the municipality: monthly for those whose population is larger than 20,000, once every two months if it ranges between 5,001 and 20,000, and once every three months if it does not exceed 5,000. Many ayuntamientos also have a local governing board (Spanish: junta de gobierno local), which is appointed by the mayor from amongst the councillors and is required for municipalities of over 5,000 inhabitants. The board, whose role is to assist the mayor between meetings of the plenary assembly, may not include more than one third of the councillors.

The largest municipality by population in the province as of the 2023 Spanish census is Ciudad Real, its capital, with 75,254 residents, while the smallest is Villar del Pozo, with 55 residents. The largest municipality by area is Almodóvar del Campo, which spans 1,207.90 square kilometres (466.37 sq mi), while Caracuel de Calatrava is the smallest at 9.92 square kilometres (3.83 sq mi).

== Municipalities ==
Largest municipalities in the province of Ciudad Real by population

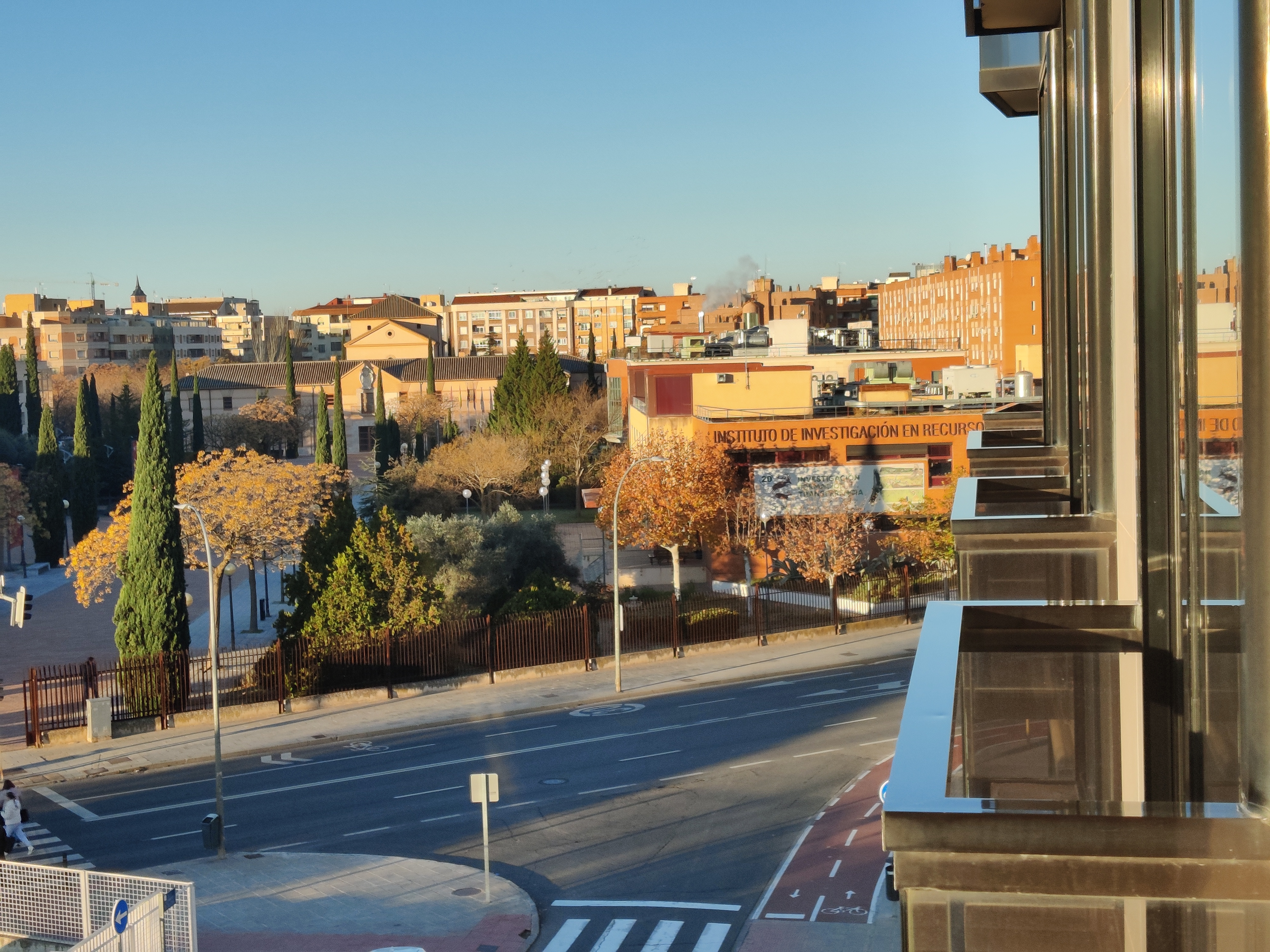
Ciudad Real is the province's capital and largest municipality by population.

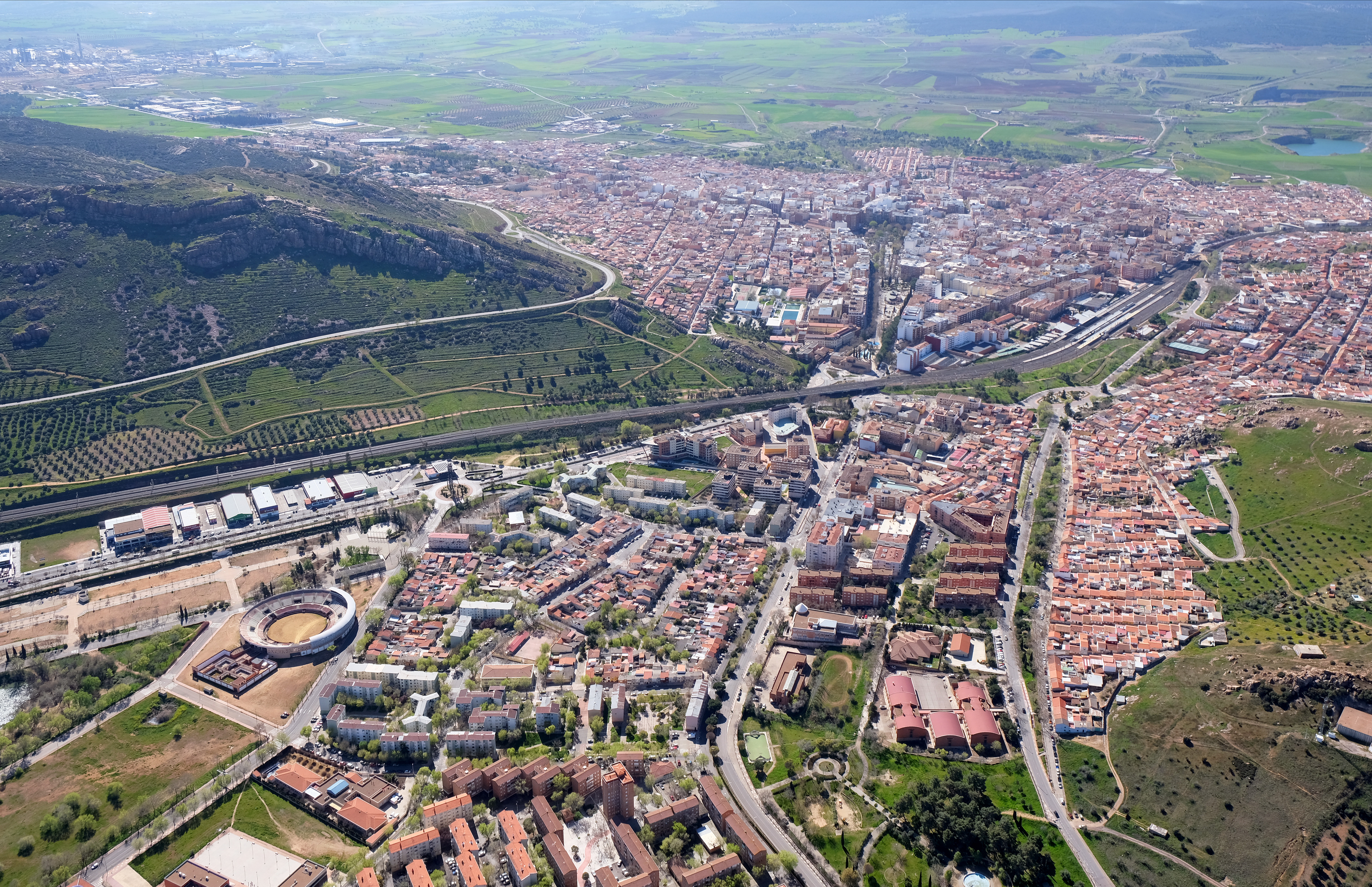
Puertollano, the second largest municipality by population in the province of Ciudad Real

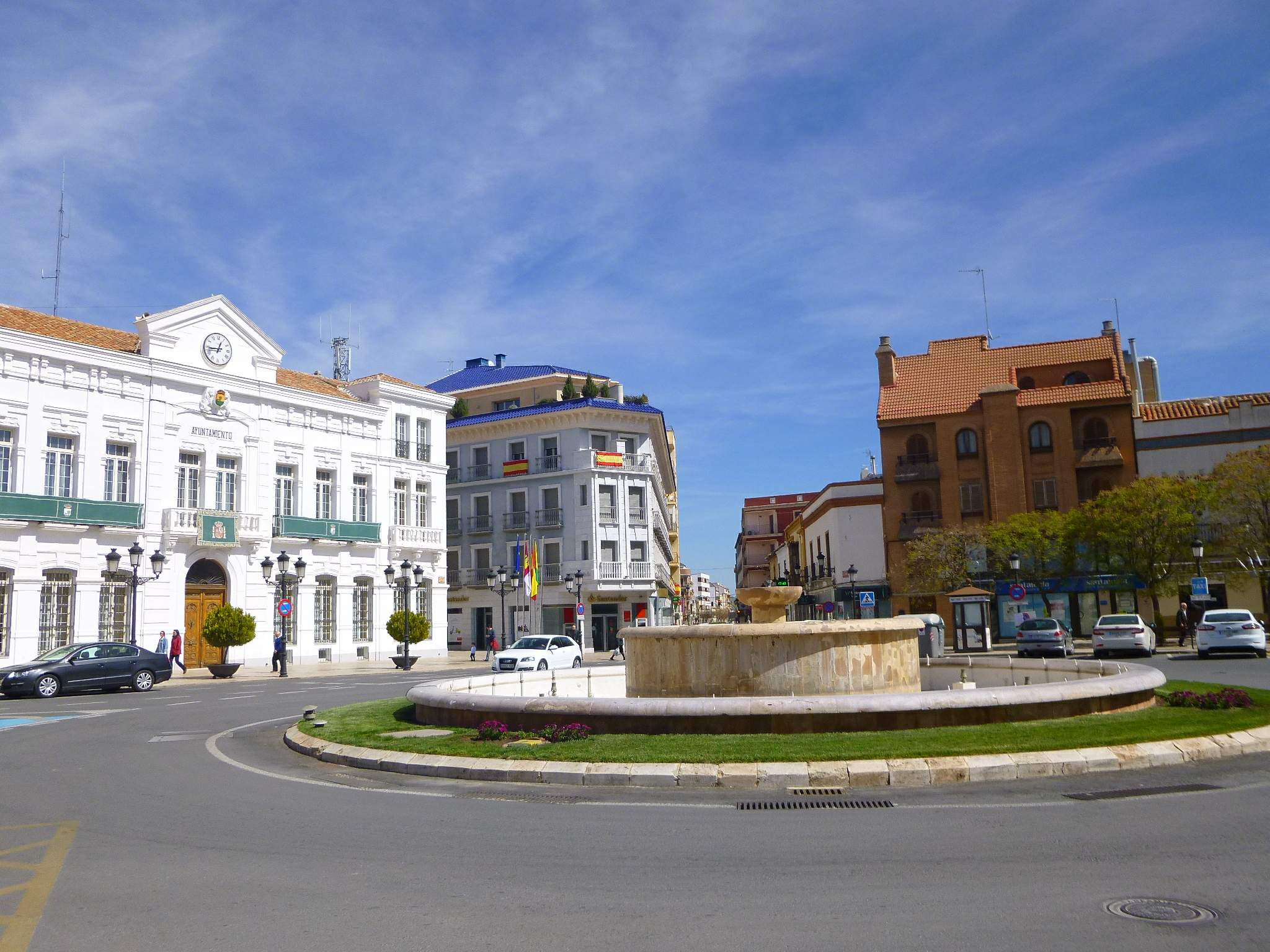
Tomelloso is the province of Ciudad Real's third largest municipality by population.

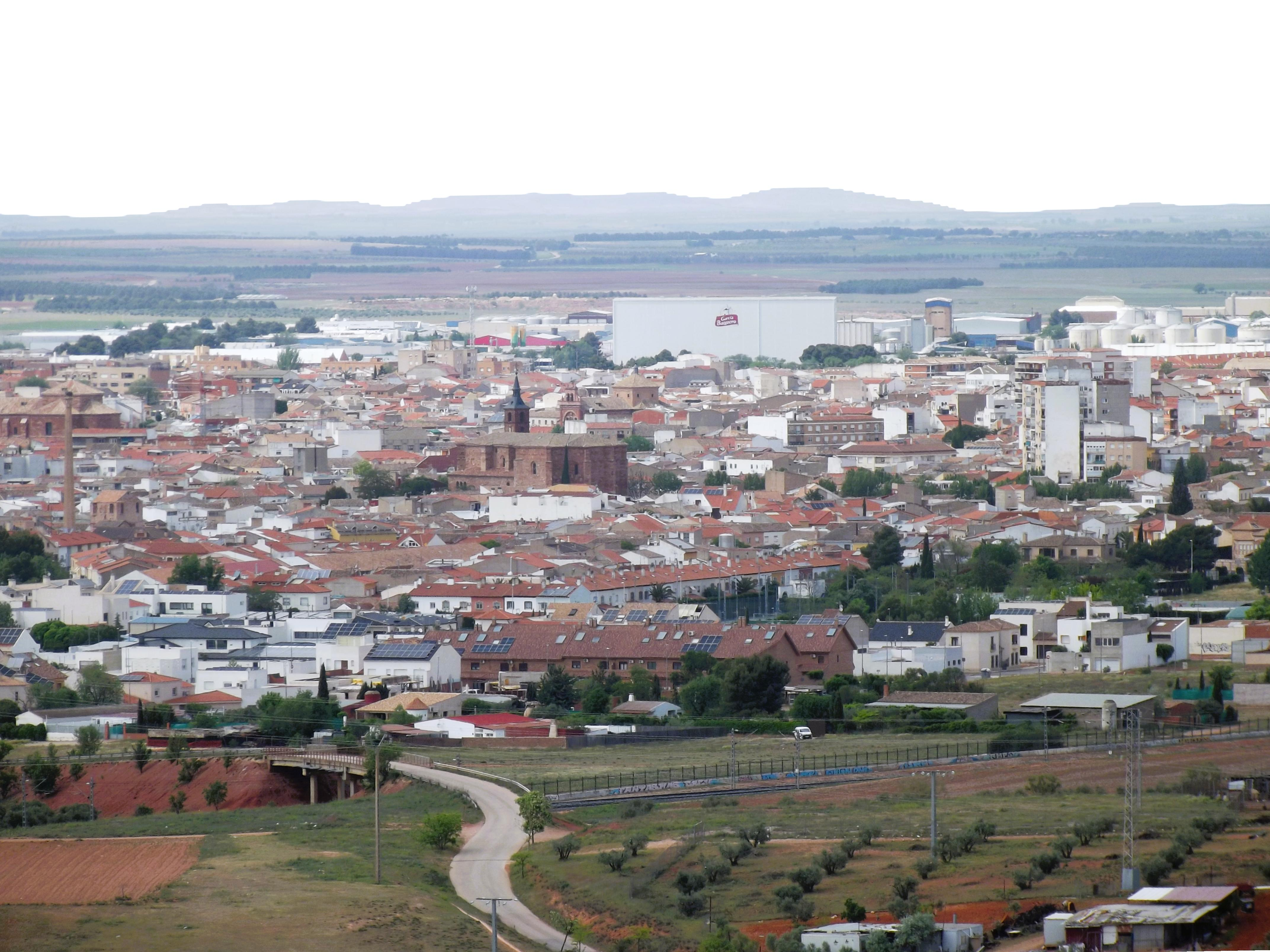
Alcázar de San Juan, the province of Ciudad Real's fourth largest municipality by population

† Provincial capital

Municipalities in the province of Ciudad Real
Name	Population (2023 census)	Population (2011 census)	Population change	Land area (km²)	Population density (2023)
Abenójar	1,331	1,588	−16.2%	423.43	3.1/km^{2}
Agudo	1,609	1,863	−13.6%	229.96	7.0/km^{2}
Alamillo	469	524	−10.5%	67.26	7.0/km^{2}
Albaladejo	1,054	1,419	−25.7%	48.94	21.5/km^{2}
Alcázar de San Juan	30,943	31,616	−2.1%	666.50	46.4/km^{2}
Alcoba	569	735	−22.6%	307.10	1.9/km^{2}
Alcolea de Calatrava	1,383	1,601	−13.6%	70.72	19.6/km^{2}
Alcubillas	445	562	−20.8%	47.46	9.4/km^{2}
Aldea del Rey	1,582	1,931	−18.1%	154.32	10.3/km^{2}
Alhambra	967	1,098	−11.9%	579.63	1.7/km^{2}
Almadén	4,966	6,064	−18.1%	239.64	20.7/km^{2}
Almadenejos	399	508	−21.5%	102.88	3.9/km^{2}
Almagro	9,003	9,183	−2.0%	249.92	36.0/km^{2}
Almedina	485	652	−25.6%	55.90	8.7/km^{2}
Almodóvar del Campo	5,787	6,684	−13.4%	1,207.90	4.8/km^{2}
Almuradiel	751	891	−15.7%	66.16	11.4/km^{2}
Anchuras	267	344	−22.4%	231.05	1.2/km^{2}
Arenales de San Gregorio	598	703	−14.9%	30.53	19.6/km^{2}
Arenas de San Juan	1,022	1,095	−6.7%	63.09	16.2/km^{2}
Argamasilla de Alba	6,837	7,263	−5.9%	396.85	17.2/km^{2}
Argamasilla de Calatrava	5,818	5,993	−2.9%	167.21	34.8/km^{2}
Arroba de los Montes	416	507	−17.9%	61.70	6.7/km^{2}
Ballesteros de Calatrava	371	460	−19.3%	57.87	6.4/km^{2}
Bolaños de Calatrava	11,978	12,134	−1.3%	87.89	136.3/km^{2}
Brazatortas	1,005	1,107	−9.2%	271.60	3.7/km^{2}
Cabezarados	308	360	−14.4%	80.36	3.8/km^{2}
Cabezarrubias del Puerto	497	555	−10.5%	100.85	4.9/km^{2}
Calzada de Calatrava	3,809	4,416	−13.7%	410.82	9.3/km^{2}
Campo de Criptana	12,972	14,640	−11.4%	303.39	42.8/km^{2}
Cañada de Calatrava	100	117	−14.5%	30.13	3.3/km^{2}
Caracuel de Calatrava	144	170	−15.3%	9.92	14.5/km^{2}
Carrión de Calatrava	3,183	3,010	+5.7%	94.33	33.7/km^{2}
Carrizosa	1,137	1,430	−20.5%	26.04	43.7/km^{2}
Castellar de Santiago	1,802	2,176	−17.2%	95.50	18.9/km^{2}
Chillón	1,775	2,045	−13.2%	207.78	8.5/km^{2}
Ciudad Real†	75,254	75,071	+0.2%	285.15	263.9/km^{2}
Corral de Calatrava	1,124	1,170	−3.9%	148.82	7.6/km^{2}
Los Cortijos	859	972	−11.6%	95.24	9.0/km^{2}
Cózar	934	1,161	−19.6%	64.99	14.4/km^{2}
Daimiel	17,673	18,670	−5.3%	438.06	40.3/km^{2}
Fernán Caballero	992	1,116	−11.1%	103.90	9.5/km^{2}
Fontanarejo	237	311	−23.8%	76.95	3.1/km^{2}
Fuencaliente	1,010	1,115	−9.4%	270.05	3.7/km^{2}
Fuenllana	206	276	−25.4%	59.96	3.4/km^{2}
Fuente el Fresno	3,072	3,586	−14.3%	119.46	25.7/km^{2}
Granátula de Calatrava	699	869	−19.6%	152.65	4.6/km^{2}
Guadalmez	718	902	−20.4%	71.99	10.0/km^{2}
Herencia	8,405	9,006	−6.7%	227.31	37.0/km^{2}
Hinojosas de Calatrava	506	537	−5.8%	102.44	4.9/km^{2}
Horcajo de los Montes	801	1,024	−21.8%	207.47	3.9/km^{2}
Las Labores	548	650	−15.7%	34.14	16.1/km^{2}
Llanos del Caudillo	697	716	−2.7%	20.42	34.1/km^{2}
Luciana	371	410	−9.5%	113.84	3.3/km^{2}
Malagón	7,755	8,688	−10.7%	364.80	21.3/km^{2}
Manzanares	17,716	19,181	−7.6%	473.82	37.4/km^{2}
Membrilla	5,827	6,285	−7.3%	144.09	40.4/km^{2}
Mestanza	662	818	−19.1%	370.91	1.8/km^{2}
Miguelturra	15,766	14,711	+7.2%	119.17	132.3/km^{2}
Montiel	1,219	1,528	−20.2%	270.89	4.5/km^{2}
Moral de Calatrava	5,121	5,635	−9.1%	188.52	27.2/km^{2}
Navalpino	211	258	−18.2%	196.33	1.1/km^{2}
Navas de Estena	286	319	−10.3%	146.54	2.0/km^{2}
Pedro Muñoz	7,637	8,331	−8.3%	101.63	75.1/km^{2}
Picón	682	709	−3.8%	59.57	11.4/km^{2}
Piedrabuena	4,360	4,752	−8.2%	565.36	7.7/km^{2}
Poblete	2,862	2,034	+40.7%	27.93	102.5/km^{2}
Porzuna	3,524	3,962	−11.1%	211.90	16.6/km^{2}
Pozuelo de Calatrava	3,743	3,314	+12.9%	99.93	37.5/km^{2}
Los Pozuelos de Calatrava	368	447	−17.7%	84.00	4.4/km^{2}
Puebla de Don Rodrigo	1,131	1,237	−8.6%	424.87	2.7/km^{2}
Puebla del Príncipe	664	791	−16.1%	33.97	19.5/km^{2}
Puerto Lápice	881	1,012	−12.9%	54.84	16.1/km^{2}
Puertollano	45,243	51,924	−12.9%	225.13	201.0/km^{2}
Retuerta del Bullaque	898	1,086	−17.3%	654.83	1.4/km^{2}
El Robledo	1,068	1,232	−13.3%	105.50	10.1/km^{2}
Ruidera	539	601	−10.3%	39.20	13.8/km^{2}
Saceruela	529	629	−15.9%	247.28	2.1/km^{2}
San Carlos del Valle	1,082	1,207	−10.4%	57.69	18.8/km^{2}
San Lorenzo de Calatrava	199	234	−15.0%	105.84	1.9/km^{2}
Santa Cruz de los Cáñamos	490	595	−17.6%	17.72	27.7/km^{2}
Santa Cruz de Mudela	3,876	4,569	−15.2%	133.58	29.0/km^{2}
Socuéllamos	12,162	13,374	−9.1%	372.44	32.7/km^{2}
La Solana	15,220	16,151	−5.8%	135.17	112.6/km^{2}
Solana del Pino	332	414	−19.8%	180.07	1.8/km^{2}
Terrinches	605	844	−28.3%	55.52	10.9/km^{2}
Tomelloso	36,462	38,061	−4.2%	242.15	150.6/km^{2}
Torralba de Calatrava	3,063	3,149	−2.7%	101.58	30.2/km^{2}
Torre de Juan Abad	970	1,196	−18.9%	399.19	2.4/km^{2}
Torrenueva	2,644	3,007	−12.1%	142.00	18.6/km^{2}
Valdemanco del Esteras	162	223	−27.4%	142.46	1.1/km^{2}
Valdepeñas	30,380	30,961	−1.9%	489.26	62.1/km^{2}
Valenzuela de Calatrava	654	766	−14.6%	44.08	14.8/km^{2}
Villahermosa	1,720	2,177	−21.0%	363.01	4.7/km^{2}
Villamanrique	1,082	1,384	−21.8%	370.27	2.9/km^{2}
Villamayor de Calatrava	640	650	−1.5%	144.81	4.4/km^{2}
Villanueva de la Fuente	1,926	2,406	−20.0%	129.10	14.9/km^{2}
Villanueva de los Infantes	4,739	5,647	−16.1%	135.06	35.1/km^{2}
Villanueva de San Carlos	280	358	−21.8%	109.08	2.6/km^{2}
Villar del Pozo	55	97	−43.3%	13.14	4.2/km^{2}
Villarrubia de los Ojos	9,751	10,897	−10.5%	281.86	34.6/km^{2}
Villarta de San Juan	2,710	3,057	−11.4%	66.00	41.1/km^{2}
Viso del Marqués	2,143	2,718	−21.2%	533.20	4.0/km^{2}
Province of Ciudad Real	491,927	526,628	−6.6%	19,812.81	24.8/km^{2}
Castilla–La Mancha	2,084,086	2,106,331	−1.1%	79,410.62	26.2/km^{2}
Spain	48,085,361	46,815,916	+2.7%	504,755.17	95.3/km^{2}

== See also ==
- Geography of Spain
- List of municipalities of Spain
