= Province of Ciudad Real =

Province of Spain

Province of Ciudad Real Provincia de Ciudad Real
- Province
- Flag Coat of arms

- Map of the Province of Ciudad Real in Spain
- Coordinates: 39°00′N 4°00′W
- Country: Spain
- Autonomous community: Castilla–La Mancha
- Capital: Ciudad Real

Government
  - Type: Diputación
  - Body: Provincial Deputation of Ciudad Real
  - President: Nemesio de Lara Guerrero (PSOE)

Area
  - Total: 19,812.04 km^{2} (7,649.47 sq mi)
  - Rank: 3rd in Spain
- 3.93% of Spain

Population (2025)
  - Total: 494,848
  - Rank: 31st in Spain
  - Density: 24.9771/km^{2} (64.6905/sq mi)
- Demonym: Ciudarrealeños/ciudarrealeñas
- Time zone: UTC+1 (CET)
  - Summer (DST): UTC+2 (CEST)
- Website: www.dipucr.es

The Province of Ciudad Real (Spanish: Provincia de Ciudad Real [θjuˈðað reˈal]) is a province in the southwestern part of the autonomous community of Castile-La Mancha in central Spain. It is bordered by the provinces of Cuenca, Albacete, Jaén, Córdoba, Badajoz, and Toledo. It is partly located in the old natural region of La Mancha. Its capital is Ciudad Real.

It has a population of 494,848 in an area of 19,812.04 square kilometres (7,649.47 sq mi) – the third largest area among the provinces of Spain, after the provinces of Cáceres and Badajoz – among its 102 municipalities.

== History ==
Ciudad Real was one of the 49 provinces in which Spain was divided in the territorial reorganization of 1833, taking its name from its largest city and capital. Its limits corresponded more or less to the historical province of La Mancha, which was part of the kingdom of Toledo.

The Spanish government created the autonomous community of Castilla-La Mancha on 15 November 1978, as one of several autonomous regions. The new, hyphenated name was chosen to join the historic Castilla region, which extended beyond the new autonomous region, and that of the smaller historic province of La Mancha. Initially a "pre-autonomous" region, the reorganization proposal finally took effect one week after the Statute of Autonomy of Castilla–La Mancha was approved on 10 August 1982. Under this new arrangement, Castilla-La Mancha was subdivided into five provinces, Albacete, Ciudad Real, Cuenca, Guadalajara, and Toledo, each named after its capital and largest city.

== Geography ==
The province of Ciudad Real is located in central Spain and is the third largest province in the country with an area of 19,813 km^{2} (7,650 mi^{2}). To the north lies the Province of Toledo, to the northeast the Province of Cuenca, to the east the Province of Albacete, to the south lie the Provinces of Córdoba and Jaén, and to the west the Province of Badajoz. To the northwest of the province is a separate area, the exclave of Anchuras, which is sandwiched between the Province of Badajoz and the Province of Toledo. The provincial capital is Ciudad Real. Part of the province is part of the plateau of La Mancha, an elevated but fertile area averaging 500 to 600 metres (1,600 to 2,000 ft) above sea level, the highest elevation being in the comarca of Campo de Montiel at 900 metres (2,950 ft). The main river, crossing the province from east to west, is the Guadiana, and its right bank tributary, the Cigüela.

Most of the province is an arid plain, cool in summer and very cold in winter with wide daily fluctuations. The area is agricultural, with wheat, barley, oats, sugar beet, grapes and olives being grown. Cattle are raised here and there are large flocks of sheep. In the valleys formed by the upper reaches of the Guadiana and Cigüela is a wetland area called La Mancha Húmeda. The lagoons and marshes have a resident population of wetland birds and are visited by migrating wildfowl in autumn and spring.

The largest towns in the province are Ciudad Real, with a population of 74,960 at the 2014 census, Puertollano with 50,608, Tomelloso with 38,080, Alcázar de San Juan with 31,650, and Valdepeñas with 30,705. Other larger municipalities with over ten thousand inhabitants are Manzanares, Daimiel, La Solana, Miguelturra, Campo de Criptana, Socuéllamos, Bolaños de Calatrava and Villarrubia de los Ojos.

The Tablas de Daimiel National Park is located in the province of Ciudad Real. It is a wetland area on the La Mancha plain, an otherwise mainly arid region. It has an area of about 2,000 hectares and is the smallest of Spain's fifteen national parks. It is being expanded to include some of the neighbouring dryland farming areas. The Cabañeros National Park is shared with the neighbouring Province of Toledo. It has an area of 390 square kilometres (150 sq mi) and lies between the Estena and Bullaque rivers, extending into the Chorito and Miraflores mountain ranges. It contains remnants of the Iberian Mediterranean forest which used to clothe this part of Spain.

In the centre of the province is the Campo de Calatrava, the geology of which is volcanic. The Campo de Calatrava Volcanic Field covers an area of 5,000 square kilometres (1,900 mi^{2}) and has more than three hundred individual structures. It is composed of pyroclastic cones, lava domes and maars, and rises to 1,117 m (3,665 ft). The last known eruption was around 3,600 BC.

== Administration ==
=== Municipalities ===
The province has 102 municipalities:

- Abenójar
- Agudo
- Alamillo
- Albaladejo
- Alcázar de San Juan
- Alcoba
- Alcolea de Calatrava
- Alcubillas
- Aldea del Rey
- Alhambra
- Almadén
- Almadenejos
- Almagro
- Almedina
- Almodóvar del Campo
- Almuradiel
- Anchuras
- Arenales de San Gregorio
- Arenas de San Juan
- Argamasilla de Alba
- Argamasilla de Calatrava
- Arroba de los Montes
- Ballesteros de Calatrava
- Bolaños de Calatrava
- Brazatortas
- Cabezarados
- Cabezarrubias del Puerto
- Calzada de Calatrava
- Campo de Criptana
- Cañada de Calatrava
- Caracuel de Calatrava
- Carrión de Calatrava
- Carrizosa
- Castellar de Santiago
- Chillón
- Ciudad Real
- Corral de Calatrava
- Cózar
- Daimiel
- El Robledo
- Fernán Caballero
- Fontanarejo
- Fuencaliente
- Fuenllana
- Fuente el Fresno
- Granátula de Calatrava
- Guadalmez
- Herencia
- Hinojosas de Calatrava
- Horcajo de los Montes
- La Solana
- Las Labores
- Llanos del Caudillo
- Los Cortijos
- Los Pozuelos de Calatrava
- Luciana
- Malagón
- Manzanares
- Membrilla
- Mestanza
- Miguelturra
- Montiel
- Moral de Calatrava
- Navalpino
- Navas de Estena
- Pedro Muñoz
- Picón
- Piedrabuena
- Poblete
- Porzuna
- Pozuelo de Calatrava
- Puebla de Don Rodrigo
- Puebla del Príncipe
- Puerto Lápice
- Puertollano
- Retuerta del Bullaque
- Ruidera
- Saceruela
- San Carlos del Valle
- San Lorenzo de Calatrava
- Santa Cruz de los Cáñamos
- Santa Cruz de Mudela
- Socuéllamos
- Solana del Pino
- Terrinches
- Tomelloso
- Torralba de Calatrava
- Torre de Juan Abad
- Torrenueva
- Valdemanco del Esteras
- Valdepeñas
- Valenzuela de Calatrava
- Villahermosa
- Villamanrique
- Villamayor de Calatrava
- Villanueva de la Fuente
- Villanueva de los Infantes
- Villanueva de San Carlos
- Villar del Pozo
- Villarrubia de los Ojos
- Villarta de San Juan
- Viso del Marqués

== Demographics ==
As of 2025, the population is 494,848, of which 49.6% are males, and 50.4% are females. Minors make up 16.1% of the population, and seniors make up 21.8%.

Historical population

Year	Pop.	±%
1842	235,215	—
1857	244,330	+3.9%
1877	254,722	+4.3%
1887	287,142	+12.7%
1900	318,991	+11.1%
1910	375,632	+17.8%
1920	428,194	+14.0%
1930	491,201	+14.7%
1940	537,549	+9.4%

Year	Pop.	±%
1950	572,589	+6.5%
1960	589,365	+2.9%
1970	512,821	−13.0%
1981	475,129	−7.3%
1991	475,435	+0.1%
2001	478,957	+0.7%
2011	526,628	+10.0%
2021	492,900	−6.4%

Source: INE

=== Immigration ===
As of 2025, immigrants make up 10.0% of the population. The 5 largest foreign countries of birth are Romania, Morocco, Colombia, Venezuela, and Ecuador.

== Transport ==
The province has good communications with other parts of Spain and is on the main route between Toledo and Andalusia. The A-4 route passes from north to south between Puerto Lápice and Almuradiel on the way from Madrid to Andalusia. The capital, Puertollano, and other locations are linked to this road by the A-43 and A-41, and the Autovía de los Viñedos motorway passes through the northeastern part of the province. Railway communications are via the Madrid–Seville high-speed rail line which has stations in the towns of Ciudad Real and Puertollano. Air travel was enabled by the opening in 2008 of the Ciudad Real Central Airport, which started to have international flights in June 2010. However, the link to the high-speed railway line was never built and the airport had financial difficulties and went into administration in October of the same year. In September 2015, it was reported that a new owner had purchased the airport.
