= Municipalities in Castilla–La Mancha =

Map of Spain with the autonomous community of Castilla–La Mancha highlighted

Castilla–La Mancha is an autonomous community of Spain that is divided into five provinces and 919 municipalities. There are 87 municipalities in Albacete, 102 in Ciudad Real, 238 in Cuenca, 288 in Guadalajara and 204 in Toledo.

The organisation of municipalities in Spain is outlined in a local government law (Spanish: Ley 7/1985, de 2 de abril, Reguladora de las Bases del Régimen Local; transl. Law 7/1985, of 2 April, Regulating the Bases of the Local Administration) passed on 2 April 1985 and finalised by an 18 April 1986 royal decree. The Statute of Autonomy of Castilla–La Mancha also contains provisions concerning the relations between the municipalities and the autonomous government of Castilla–La Mancha. All citizens of Spain are required to register in the municipality in which they reside. Each municipality is a corporation with independent legal personhood: its governing body is called the ayuntamiento (municipal council or corporation), a term often also used to refer to the municipal offices (city and town halls). The ayuntamiento is composed of the mayor (Spanish: alcalde), the deputy mayors (tenientes de alcalde) and the plenary assembly (pleno) of councillors (concejales). Municipalities are categorised by population for the purpose of determining the number of councillors: three when the population is up to 100 inhabitants, five for 101–250, seven for 251–1,000, nine for 1,001–2,000, eleven for 2,001–5,000, thirteen for 5,001–10,000, seventeen for 10,001–20,000, twenty-one for 20,001–50,000, and twenty-five for 50,001–100,000. One councillor is added for every additional 100,000 inhabitants, with a further one added when the number of councillors based on this methodology would be even in order to prevent tied votes.

The mayor and the deputy mayors are elected by the plenary assembly, which is itself elected by universal suffrage. Elections in municipalities with more than 250 inhabitants are carried out following a proportional representation system with closed lists, whilst those with a population lower than 250 use a block plurality voting system with open lists. The plenary assembly must meet periodically at the seat of the ayuntamiento, with meetings occurring more or less frequently depending on the population of the municipality: monthly for those whose population is larger than 20,000, once every two months if it ranges between 5,001 and 20,000, and once every three months if it does not exceed 5,000. Many ayuntamientos also have a local governing board (Spanish: junta de gobierno local), which is named by the mayor from amongst the councillors and is required for municipalities of more than 5,000 inhabitants. The board, whose role is to assist the mayor between meetings of the plenary assembly, may not include more than one third of the councillors.

The most populous municipalities in each province are: Albacete with 173,202 residents in the province of Albacete which is also the most populous municipality in Castilla–La Mancha, Ciudad Real with 75,254 residents in the province of Ciudad Real, Cuenca with 53,630 residents in the province of Cuenca, Guadalajara with 88,886 residents in the province of Guadalajara, and Toledo with 85,818 residents in the province of Toledo.

Largest municipalities in each province of Castilla–La Mancha

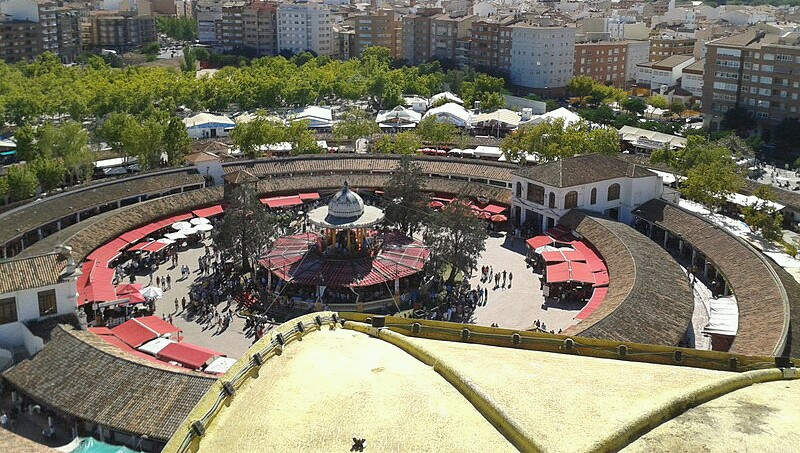
Albacete is the province's capital and largest municipality by population.

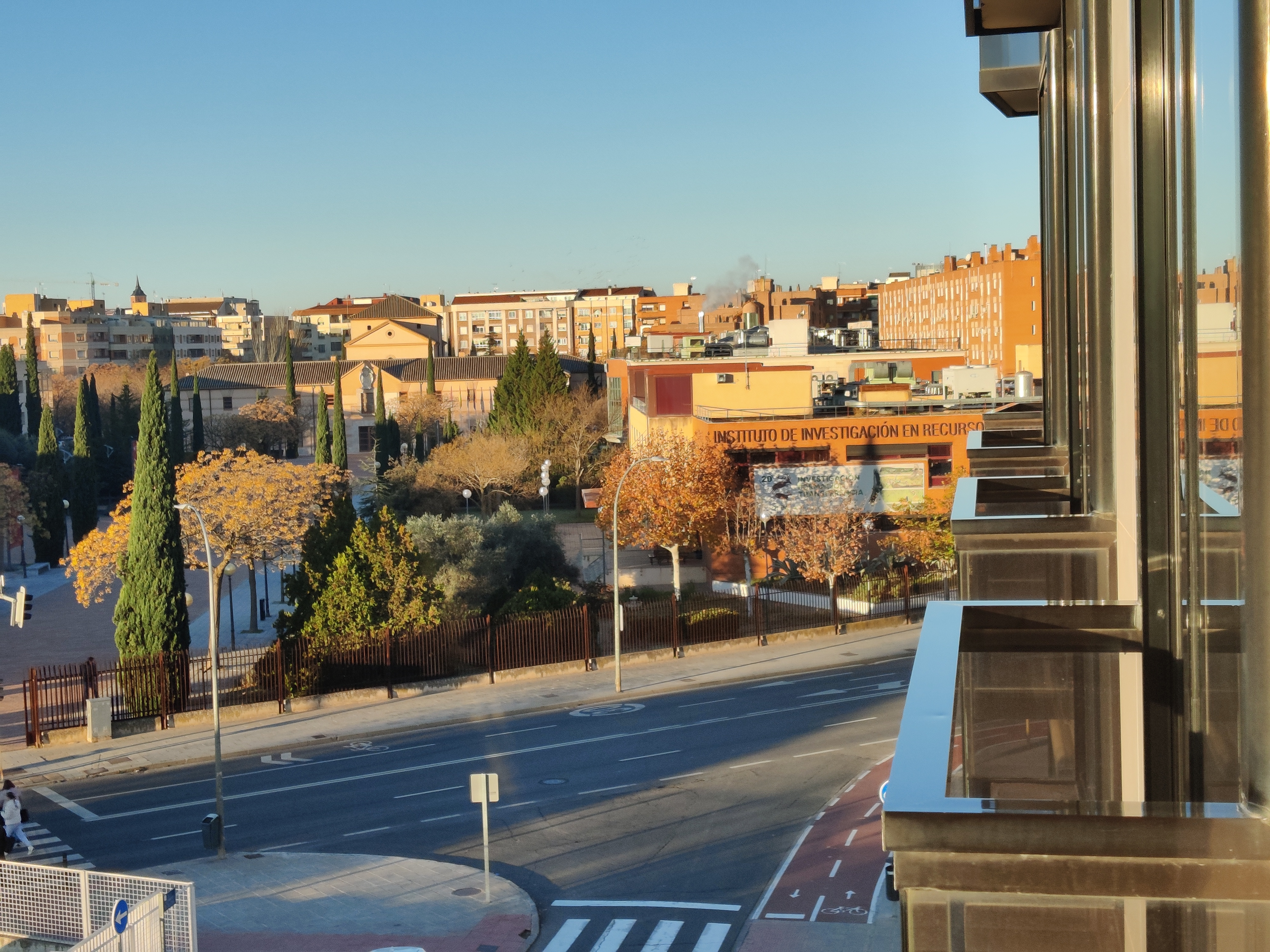
Ciudad Real is the province's capital and largest municipality by population.

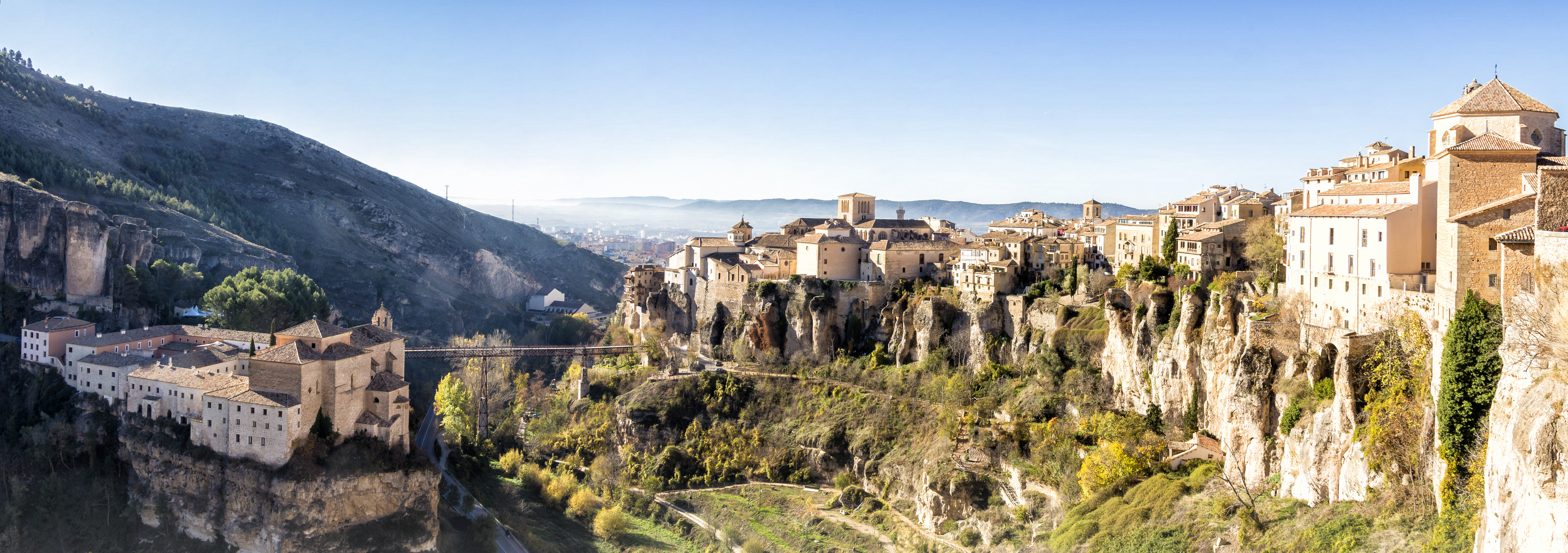
Cuenca is the province's capital and most populous municipality.

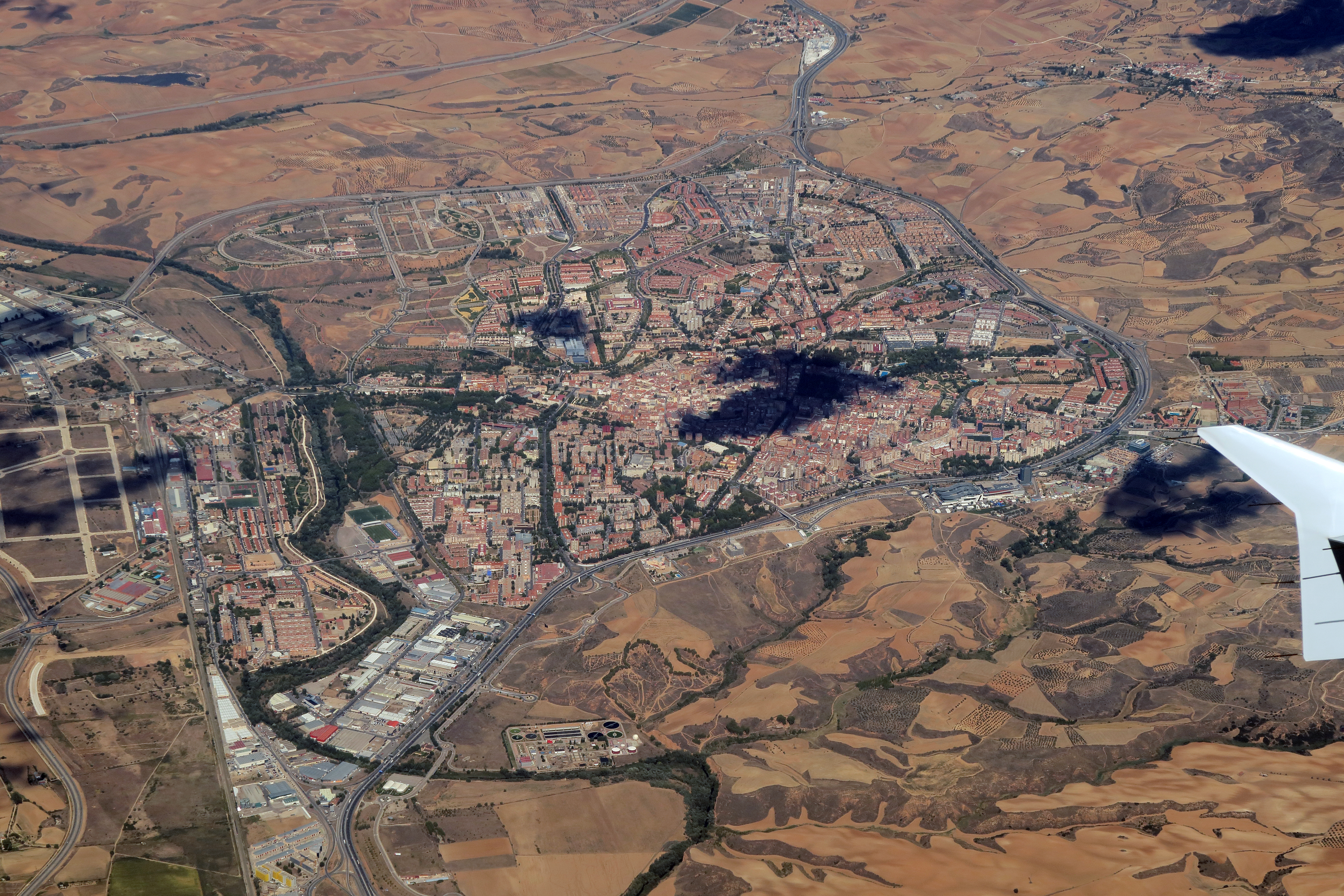
Guadalajara is the province's capital and largest municipality by population.

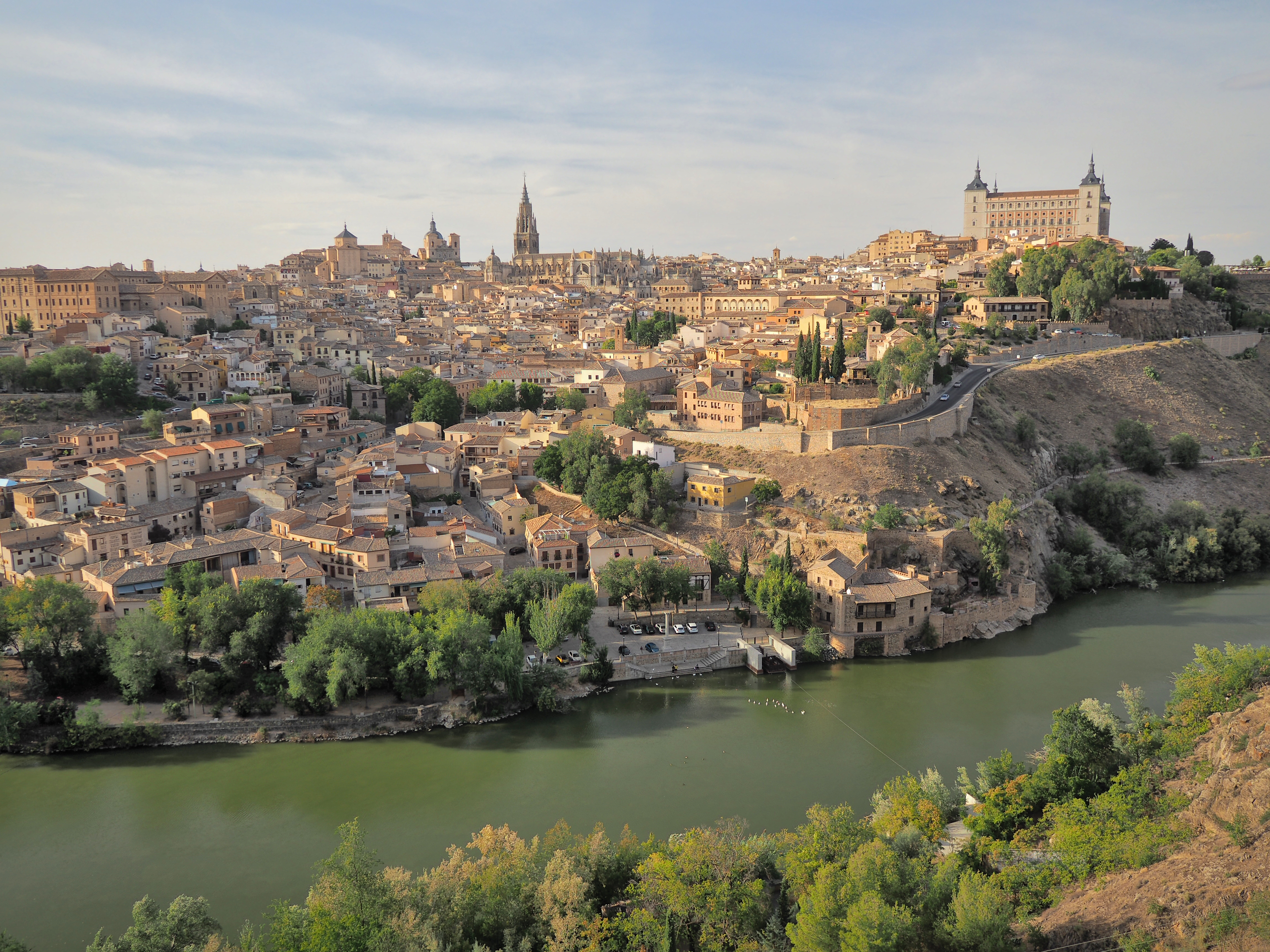
Toledo is the province's capital and largest municipality by population.

== See also ==
- List of municipalities in Albacete
- List of municipalities in Ciudad Real
- List of municipalities in Cuenca
- List of municipalities in Guadalajara
- List of municipalities in Toledo

== Sources ==
- "Ley Orgánica 9/1982, de 10 de agosto, de Estatuto de Autonomía de Castilla-La Mancha" (PDF). Boletín Oficial del Estado (in Spanish). 16 August 1982. Archived (PDF) from the original on 14 August 2024.
- "Ley 7/1985, de 2 de abril, Reguladora de las Bases del Régimen Local" (PDF). Boletín Oficial del Estado (in Spanish). 3 April 1985. Archived (PDF) from the original on 14 August 2024.
- "Ley Orgánica 5/1985, de 19 de junio, del Régimen Electoral General" (PDF). Boletín Oficial del Estado (in Spanish). 20 June 1985. Archived (PDF) from the original on 24 April 2024.
- "Real Decreto Legislativo 781/1986, de 18 de abril, por el que se aprueba el texto refundido de las disposiciones legales vigentes en materia de Régimen Local" (PDF). Boletín Oficial del Estado (in Spanish). 22 April 1986. Archived (PDF) from the original on 11 July 2024.
