= Manuel Zúñiga =

Spanish footballer and manager

Personal information
- Full name: Manuel Zúñiga Fernández
- Date of birth: 29 June 1960 (age 66)
- Place of birth: Luciana, Spain
- Height: 1.72 m (5 ft 8 in)
- Position: Midfielder

Youth career
- Calvo Sotelo

Senior career*
Years	Team	Apps	(Gls)
1977–1979	Calvo Sotelo	74	(14)
1979–1988	Español	259	(19)
1981	→ Cádiz (loan)	10	(3)
1988–1991	Sevilla	64	(1)
1991–1993	Sabadell	24	(1)
1993–1996	Écija	84	(0)
Total		515	(38)

International career
1977–1978	Spain U18	10	(0)
1979	Spain U19	3	(0)
1979	Spain U20	3	(1)
1979–1987	Spain U21	6	(0)
1980	Spain amateur	1	(0)
1980–1988	Spain U23	4	(2)

Managerial career
- 2010–2011: Écija
- 2011–2012: Puertollano
- 2012–2013: San Roque
- 2013–2014: Caudal
- * Club domestic league appearances and goals

Manuel Zúñiga Fernández (born 29 June 1960) is a Spanish former professional football right midfielder and manager.

He amassed La Liga totals of 323 games and 20 goals over 12 seasons, mainly with Espanyol (nine years) but also Sevilla. He subsequently worked as a coach in the lower leagues.

== Club career ==
Zúñiga was born in Luciana, Ciudad Real. After starting professionally with lowly CD Calvo Sotelo in the Segunda División B, he signed for RCD Español in 1979, being immediately cast in the team's rotation at the age of 19.

After only three appearances in his second season, which also included a loan to Cádiz CF to perform his military service, Zúñiga went on to average more than 30 La Liga matches per campaign, including 43 – with two goals – in 1986–87 as the Catalans qualified for the UEFA Cup. He helped them to reach the final in the subsequent continental competition, but missed his penalty in the shootout in an eventual loss against Bayer 04 Leverkusen.

In the following three years, Zúñiga played with fellow top-flight club Sevilla FC, where he still was regularly used. After 1991–92, spent with CE Sabadell FC in the Segunda División, he moved to Écija Balompié, helping it to promote to division two in 1995 and partnering Real Betis and Real Madrid legend Rafael Gordillo in 1995–96, retiring aged 36.

Subsequently, Zúñiga worked as a manager, never in higher than the third tier.

== International career ==
A longtime Spain under-21 international, Zúñiga never earned a cap for the full side. He did represent the nation at the 1980 Summer Olympics.
