= Cañada de Calatrava =

Coordinates: 38°51′N 4°01′W

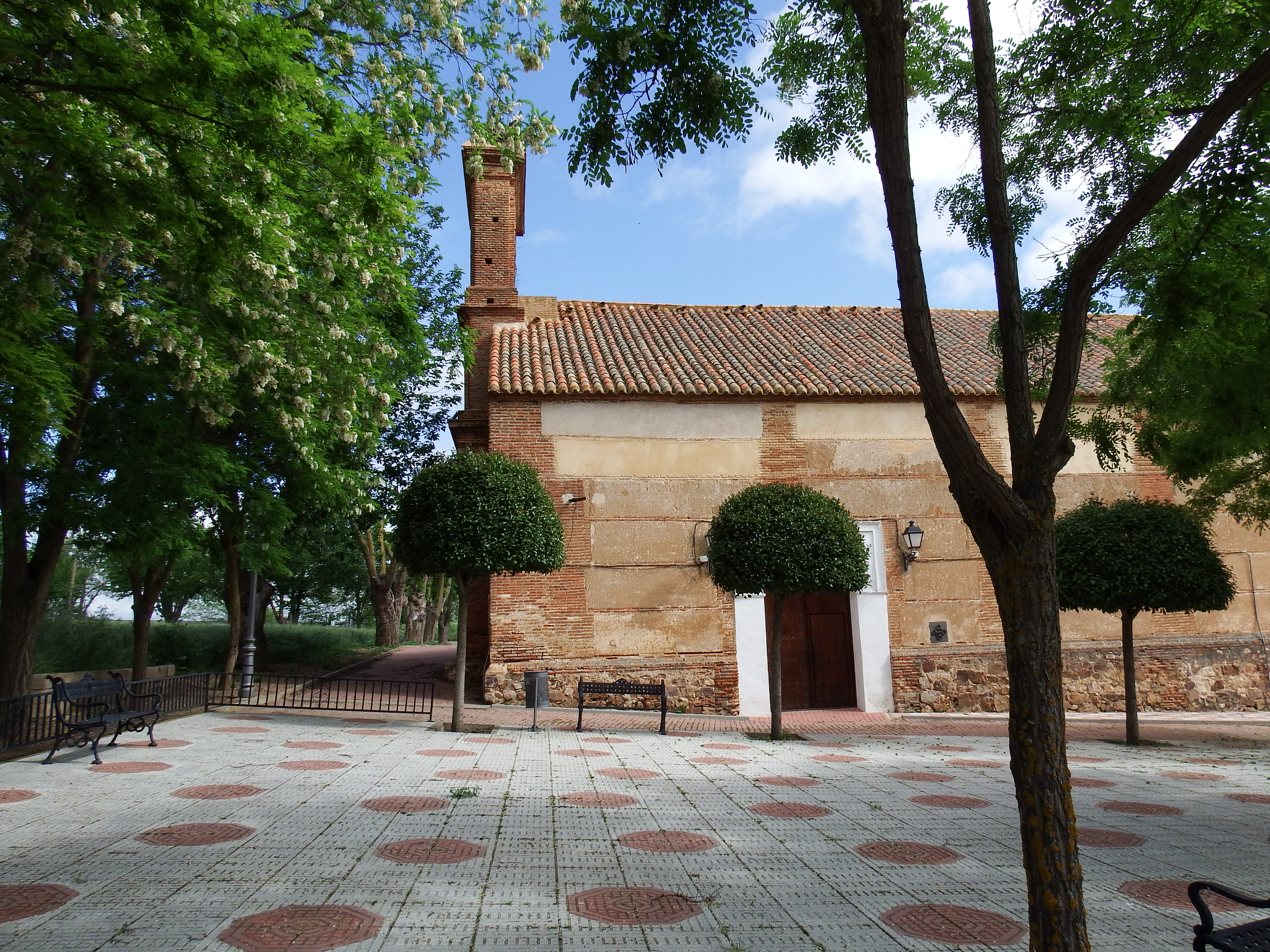
Cañada de Calatrava

Coat of arms of Cañada de Calatrava

Cañada de Calatrava is a municipality in Ciudad Real, Castile-La Mancha, Spain. The municipality borders Ciudad Real and Villar del Pozo to the east, Caracuel de Calatrava and Corral de Calatrava to the west, and Argamasilla de Calatrava to the south. It has an area of 29.9 km^{2} with a population of 92 inhabitants (INE 2018) and a density of 3.68/km^{2}.

== Geography ==
Cañada de Calatrava is located 19 kilometers from the provincial capital. The municipality is crossed by the N-420 road between mile markers (Punto Kilométrico) 182 and 183, by the Ciudad Real-Puertollano A-41 motorway and by the local road CR-P-5135 that connects Corral de Calatrava with the Ciudad Real International Airport.

The landscape and topography of the municipality is similar to its region, predominantly flat to the north in the Jabalón valley, with higher areas as you move south, highlighting the Sierra Gorda on the border with Argamasilla de Calatrava and the Sierra Vieja to the southeast. The altitude ranges from 831 meters to the south (Sierra Gorda) and 570 meters in the vicinity of the Jabalón River. The village is located at an elevation of 660 meters above sea level.

== Cañada de Calatrava Chess Festival ==
This festival is a chess tournament held in the city of Ciudad Real, Spain. It has been held twice, in 2006 and 2007. At the festival, competitors play rapid chess, competing in 5 minute and 25 minute games.

The festival has a prize pool of 122,000 Euros for the winner, contributed by 13 different large companies. Players can win in a variety of categories, competing against hundreds of other players from around the world.

=== Cañada de Calatrava Chess Festival 2006 ===
- International Chess Tournament: 177 players, winners Alexander Grischuk and Shakhriyar Mamedyarov with 7.5 points total.
- Fischer System Chess Tournament: 155 players, winners Francisco Vallejo Pons, Evgenit Najer, Alekséi Aleksándrov and Shakhriyar Mamedyarov with 7.5 points total.
- Blitzkrimmel Chess Tournament: Players have 5 minutes to win, with 138 Players, winners Shakhriyar Mamedyarov, Francisco Vallejo Pons, Vladimir Potkin, Étienne Bacrot and Alexei Alexandrov with 7.5 points total.
- Blitz Tournament: Players have 25 minutes to win, with 138 players, winners Shakhriyar Mamedyarov, Cristian Bauer and Francisco Vallejo Pons with 7.5 points total.

=== Cañada de Calatrava Chess Festival 2007 ===
- Active International Tournament: over 240 players, with the final classifications on April 6–8, 2007.

Winners: Alexei Shirov 7 1/2 (401/2), Daniel Fridman 7 1/2 (40), Ivan Sokolov 7 1/2 (39), Boris Gélfand 7 1/2 (381/2)

Runners Up: Judit Polgár, Shakhriyar Mamedyarov, Alexander Grischuk, Laurent Fressinet, Michal Krasenkow, Vasily Ivanchuk, Vladimir Baklan, Viswanathan Anand and Kamil Miton with 7 points total.

- Fischer System Chess Tournament: Final classification on April 6, 2007.

Winner: Alexei Shirov with 8 Points.

Runners Up: Krishnan Sasikiran, Laurent Fressinet, Vasily Ivanchuk and Alexander Grischuk, with 7 1/2 points.

- Blitzkrieg tournament: 3 minutes + 2 seconds per player in the tournament, final classifications April 7, 2007.

Winner: Vasily Ivanchuk with 8 1/2 points.

Runners Up: Rauf Mamedov, Alexander Grischuk, Vadim Milov, Aleksandr Zubov and Mihail Marin with 7 1/2 points.
