= Mestanza =

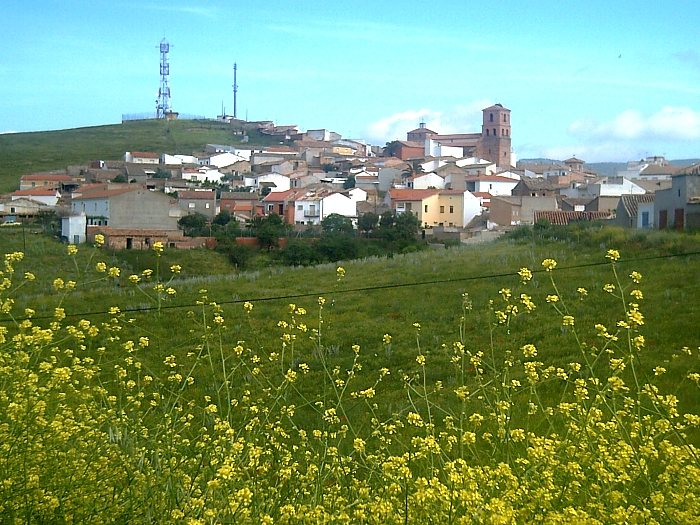
- A panoramic view of Mestanza.

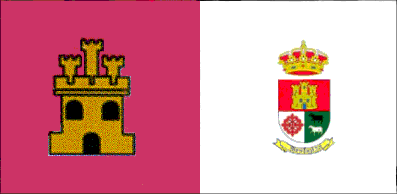
- Flag Coat of arms

- Location within Spain Location within Castilla-La Mancha
- Coordinates: 38°35′N 4°04′W
- Country: Spain
- Autonomous Community: Castilla-La Mancha
- Province: Ciudad Real

Government
  - Mayor: Antonio Pareja (PSOE)

Area
  - Total: 370.91 km^{2} (143.21 sq mi)

Population (2023)
  - Total: 663
  - Density: 1.79/km^{2} (4.63/sq mi)
- Time zone: UTC+1 (CET)
  - Summer (DST): UTC+2 (CEST)
- Postal code: 13592
- Website: www.mestanza.es

Mestanza is a town in Spain, in the province of Ciudad Real, which belongs to the community or region of Castilla-La Mancha. It has a surface area of 370 km² with a population of 663 inhabitants as per 2023 data and a population density of 1.8 inhabitants/km².

The town's municipal district includes the villages of Hoyo and Solanilla del Tamaral. It is located south of Puertollano, in the impressive valley of Alcudia, with the Montoro reservoir within the area, close to the Sierra Madrona mountain range.

Major festivities are celebrated on the day of San Pantaleón, and also celebrated on July 25 to 29. The other great celebration in Mestanza is the day known as "El Voto" (literally the vow or oath to the Virgin Mary), an old traditional pilgrimage celebrated on the last Sunday of May every year. The image of the Virgin Mary is then taken to the chapel located on the outskirts of the town.

== Prehistory ==
Various cultures have settled in this area from prehistoric times to present days. There are paleolithic paintings in the rock shelters of Fuencaliente and Solana del Pino.

In the area near the village Mestanza itself there are archeological sites in La Tabernera, El Chupón and Callejones de Río Frío, with remains of schematic painting in Puente Mercedes (El Hoyo).

== Old age ==
Roman presence became important due to the exploitation of mines in the town of Sisapo (La Bienvenida). This Roman mining complex was located in the western part of the Valley of Alcudia, and was connected with the Roman town of Cástulo (now Linares) to facilitate transportation of raw materials from the mines. An example of mining exploitation from Roman times is Minas Diógenes, in operation until the nineteen seventies.

Thus the landscape was modeled since Roman times, with overexploitation of forests in favor of intensive mining, documented from old time because Cayo Mario, brilliant strategist and 7 times consul during the last period of the Roman Republic, based his fortune on the mining concessions in the mountains called Sierras Mariánicas, named after him (Sierra Morena and Sierra Madrona).

== Middle Ages ==
In the days of the Muslim kingdoms, in the location of the present town, there was a Moorish castle, around which a mosque was built, and around them grew the town. The name Mestanza, of Berber origin, Mistasa, means mosque.

The town was conquered by Christian king Alfonso VI in 1086 to be reconquered by the Almoravids a decade later. In the year 1115, the famed Almoravid general Mazdali bin Tilankan was slain in a skirmish with Christian forces in the town or its vicinity. The Order of Calatrava made this area a Royal Dehesa (royal pastures), in recognition for having been for many centuries one of the largest spaces for receiving transhumant herds in the winter months. The cattle organization called Mesta, brought sheep here through a dense network of cattle paths. That is why the Cross of the Order of Calatrava, the mutton and the sheep are in the coat of arms of the village.

This ancient custom of carrying the herds in winter to the valley of Alcudia, remains at a lower level today, as transhumance routes for livestock have been replaced by modern means of transportation such as rail or road. Families who live in the valley in winter are known as "Serranos" as they come from the mountains (sierras) in Guadalajara, Soria, Teruel and other provinces.

== Modern Age ==
The economy in Mestanza was based on mining and grazing with occasional help from hunting. Mining is focused mainly on coal mining from the late nineteenth century until the mid-twentieth century (in nearby town Puertollano) and in the silver mineral galena (lead and silver) in the valley or El Hoyo and Solanilla del Tamaral, leading to the creation of a new parish district, Las Navas de Riofrío, near the new mining locations, later abandoned in 1927.

Due to international isolation, the government of General Franco decided to build an oil shale distillation plant in nearby Puertollano, requiring large amounts of water, so a dam was built, the Montoro Dam, which supply water to industrial plants through a tunnel in the mountains of Sierra de Mestanza, plus the necessary water pumping plants. The Montoro dam was opened by General Franco in 1950, and stores water from rivers Montoro and Tablillas.

After the end of the international blockade, the distillation plant was replaced by the current oil-refining plant, proceeding to the gradual closure of the mines. Open coal mines in Puertollano are now only for power supply.

== Demography ==
Demographic Evolution in Mestanza from 1991 to 2004

1991: 989

1996: 1.003

2001: 890

2004: 830
