= Fernán Caballero, Ciudad Real =

Fernán Caballero
- Municipality
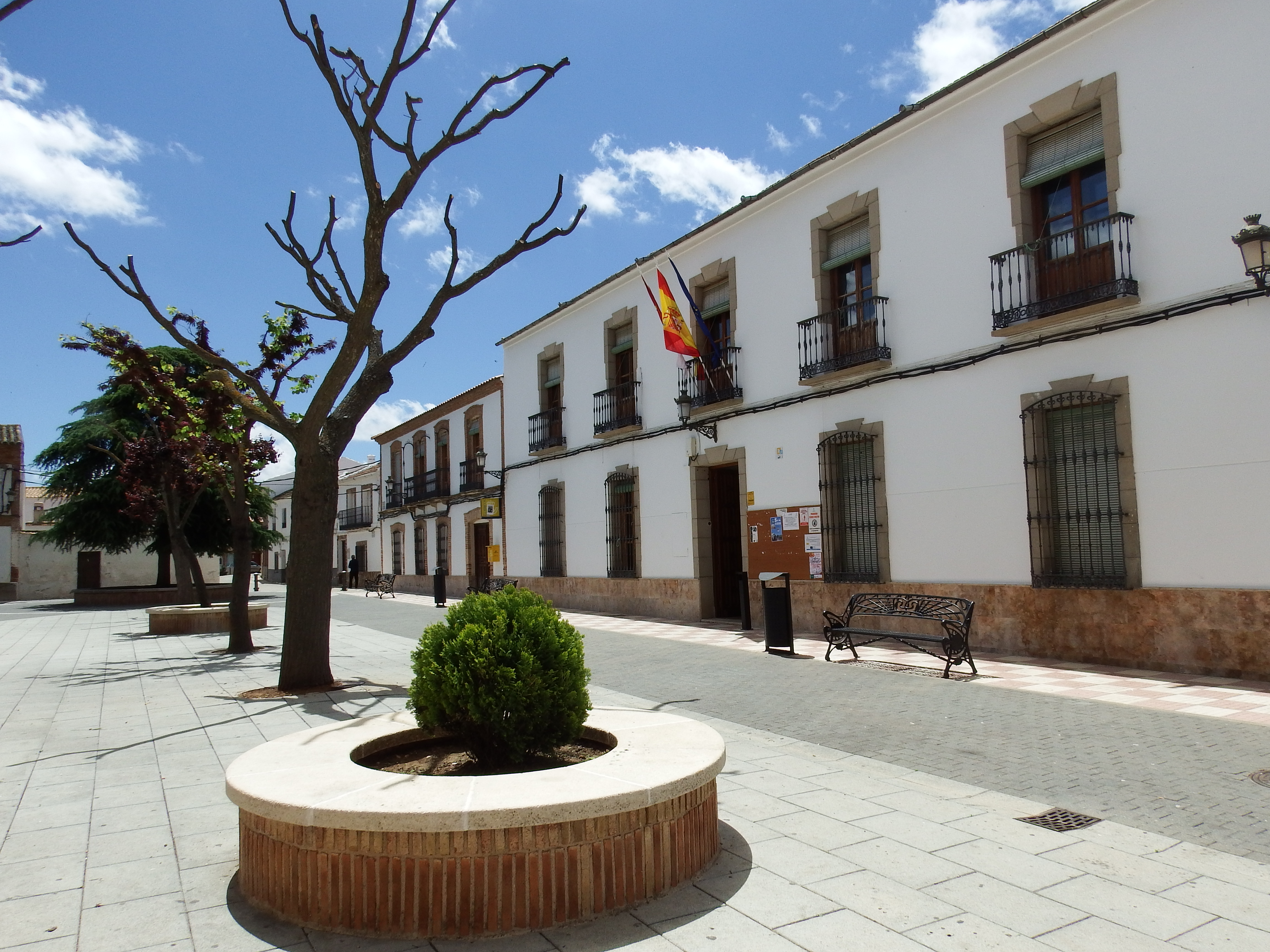
- Town hall

- Coat of arms

- Location in Spain
- Coordinates: 38°42′14″N 3°14′22″W
- Country: Spain
- Autonomous Community: Castile-La Mancha
- Province: Ciudad Real
- Comarca: Campo de Calatrava

Government
  - Mayor: Manuel Hondarza Dorado (UdCa)

Area
  - Total: 103.96 km^{2} (40.14 sq mi)

Population (2025-01-01)
  - Total: 965
  - Density: 9.28/km^{2} (24.0/sq mi)
- Time zone: UTC+1 (CET)
  - Summer (DST): UTC+2 (CEST (GMT +2))
- Postal code: 13140
- Area code: +34 (Spain) + 926 (Ciudad Real)
- Website: www.fernan-caballero.org/

Fernán Caballero is a municipality in Ciudad Real, Castile-La Mancha, Spain. The municipality has 103.96 km^{2} and had a population of 1,093 inhabitants, according to the 2013 census (INE).
