= Valdemanco del Esteras =

- Municipality
- Valdemanco del Esteras
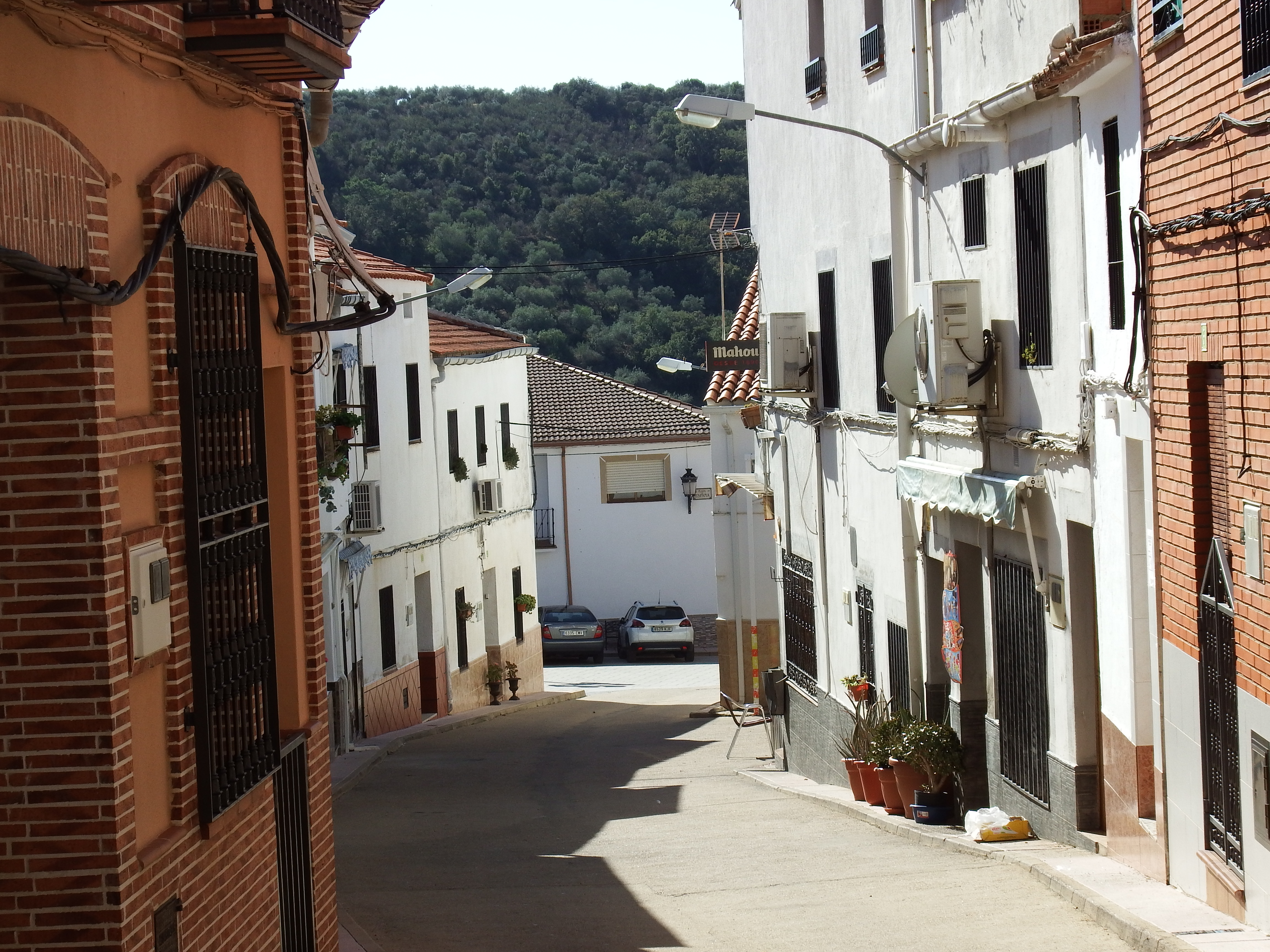

- Coat of arms

- Location in Spain
- Coordinates: 38°56′N 4°49′W
- Country: Spain
- Autonomous community: Castile-La Mancha
- Province: Ciudad Real
- Comarca: Valle de Alcudia

Government
  - Mayor: Ramón Torrero Fuentes

Area
  - Total: 142.46 km^{2} (55.00 sq mi)
- Elevation: 572 m (1,877 ft)

Population (2025-01-01)
  - Total: 157
  - Density: 1.10/km^{2} (2.85/sq mi)
- Time zone: UTC+1 (CET)
  - Summer (DST): UTC+2 (CEST)
- Postal code: 13411

Valdemanco del Esteras is a municipality in the province of Ciudad Real, Castile-La Mancha, Spain. It has a population of 247.
