= San Lorenzo de Calatrava =

- Municipality
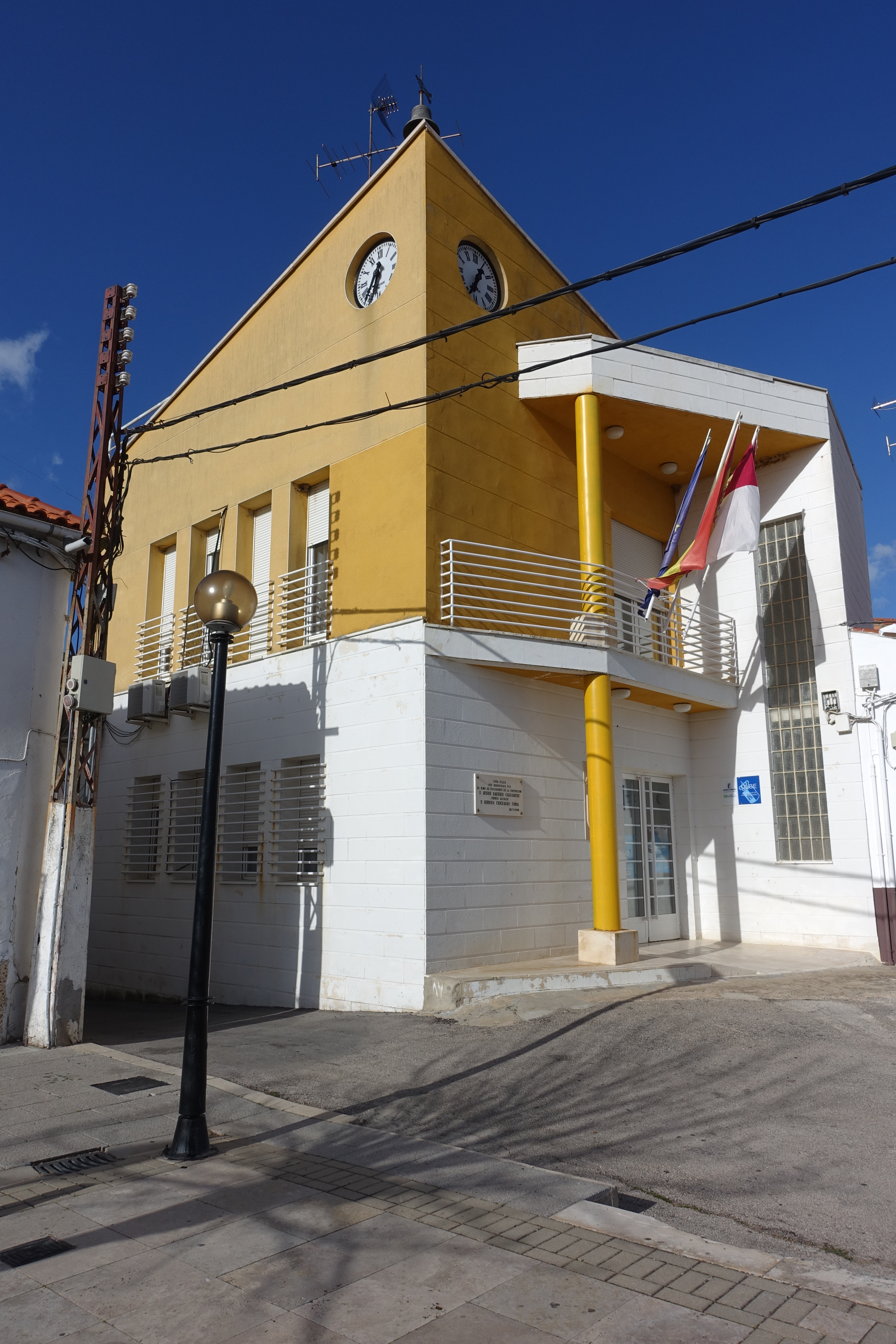
- Town hall

- Coat of arms

- Location in Spain
- Coordinates: 38°28′37″N 3°49′29″W
- Country: Spain
- Autonomous community: Castile-La Mancha
- Province: Ciudad Real

Government
  - Mayor: Isidoro Chicharro Fimia

Area
  - Total: 105.73 km^{2} (40.82 sq mi)

Population (2025-01-01)
  - Total: 189
  - Density: 1.79/km^{2} (4.63/sq mi)
- Time zone: UTC+1 (CET)
  - Summer (DST): UTC+2 (CEST)
- Postal code: 13779

San Lorenzo de Calatrava is a municipality in the province of Ciudad Real, Castile-La Mancha, Spain. It has a population of 273.
