= Arroba de los Montes =

- Municipality
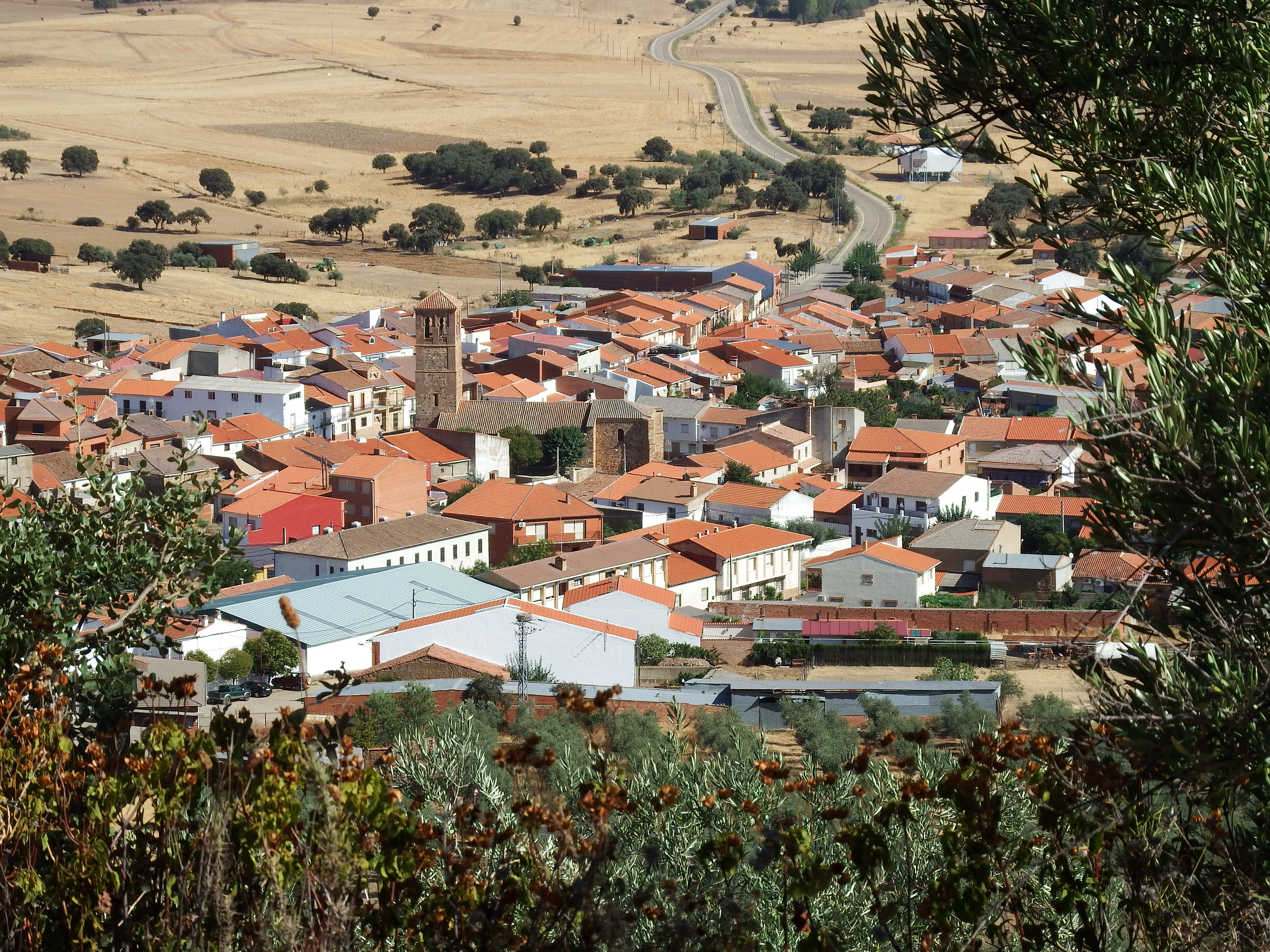
- A view of Arroba de los Montes.

- Flag Coat of arms

- Location of Arroba de los Montes del Pinar. Arroba de los Montes (Castilla-La Mancha)
- Coordinates: 39°09′16″N 4°32′37″W
- Country: Spain
- Community: Castile-La Mancha
- Province: Ciudad Real
- Comarca: Montes

Government
  - Mayor: Rosa Maria Gutierrez Camacho (PSOE)

Area
  - Total: 61.70 km^{2} (23.82 sq mi)

Population (2023)
  - Total: 415
  - Density: 6.73/km^{2} (17.4/sq mi)
- Time zone: UTC+1 (CET)
  - Summer (DST): UTC+2 (CEST)
- Postal code: 13193
- Website: arrobadelosmontes.es

Arroba de los Montes is a municipality in the Province of Ciudad Real, Castile-La Mancha, Spain. It has a population of 415 as of 2023.
