= Luciana, Ciudad Real =

Luciana
- Municipality
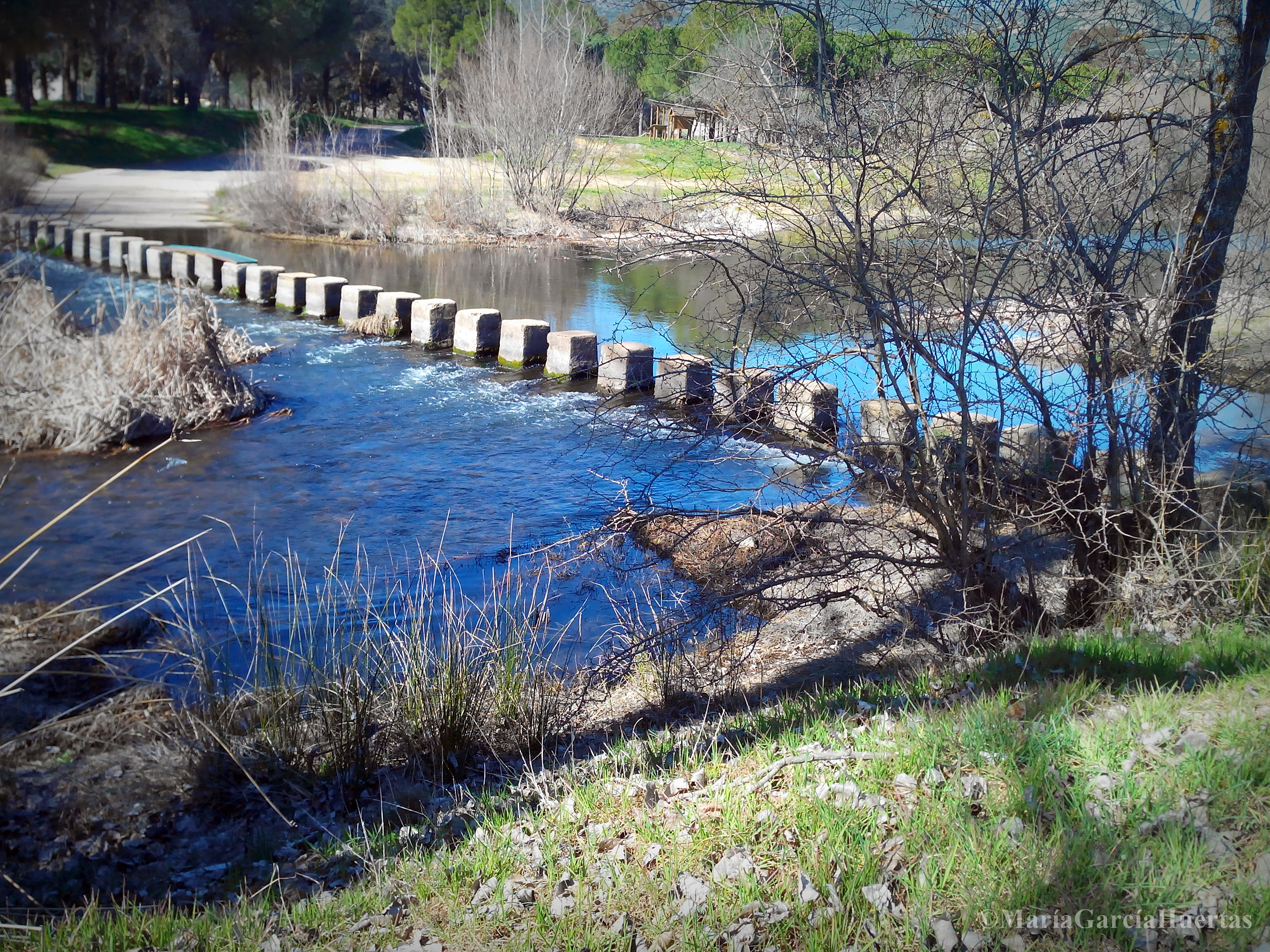
- Passing stones on the Guadiana river, in the municipality of Luciana, Ciudad Real, Spain.

- Coat of arms

- Location of Luciana Luciana (Castilla-La Mancha)
- Coordinates: 38°59′N 4°17′W
- Country: Spain
- Autonomous community: Castilla–La Mancha
- Province: Ciudad Real
- Judicial district: Ciudad Real

Government
  - Mayor: Josefa Navas Camarero (PSOE)

Area
  - Total: 113.84 km^{2} (43.95 sq mi)

Population (2024)
  - Total: 371
  - Density: 3.26/km^{2} (8.44/sq mi)
- Time zone: UTC+1 (CET)
  - Summer (DST): UTC+2 (CEST)
- Postal code: 13108
- Website: luciana.es

Luciana is a small village and municipality in the province of Ciudad Real (Spain), near the confluence of the Bullaque and Guadiana Rivers. This village is historically associated with Campo de Calatrava, in the province of Ciudad-Real and in the Autonomous Community of Castilla La Mancha. It extends up to the municipal term of Piedrabuena in the north, Abenojar in the south, Los Pozuelos in the east and up to Saceruela and Puebla de Don Rodrigo in the west.

== See also ==
- List of municipalities in Ciudad Real
