= Villanueva de San Carlos =

- Municipality
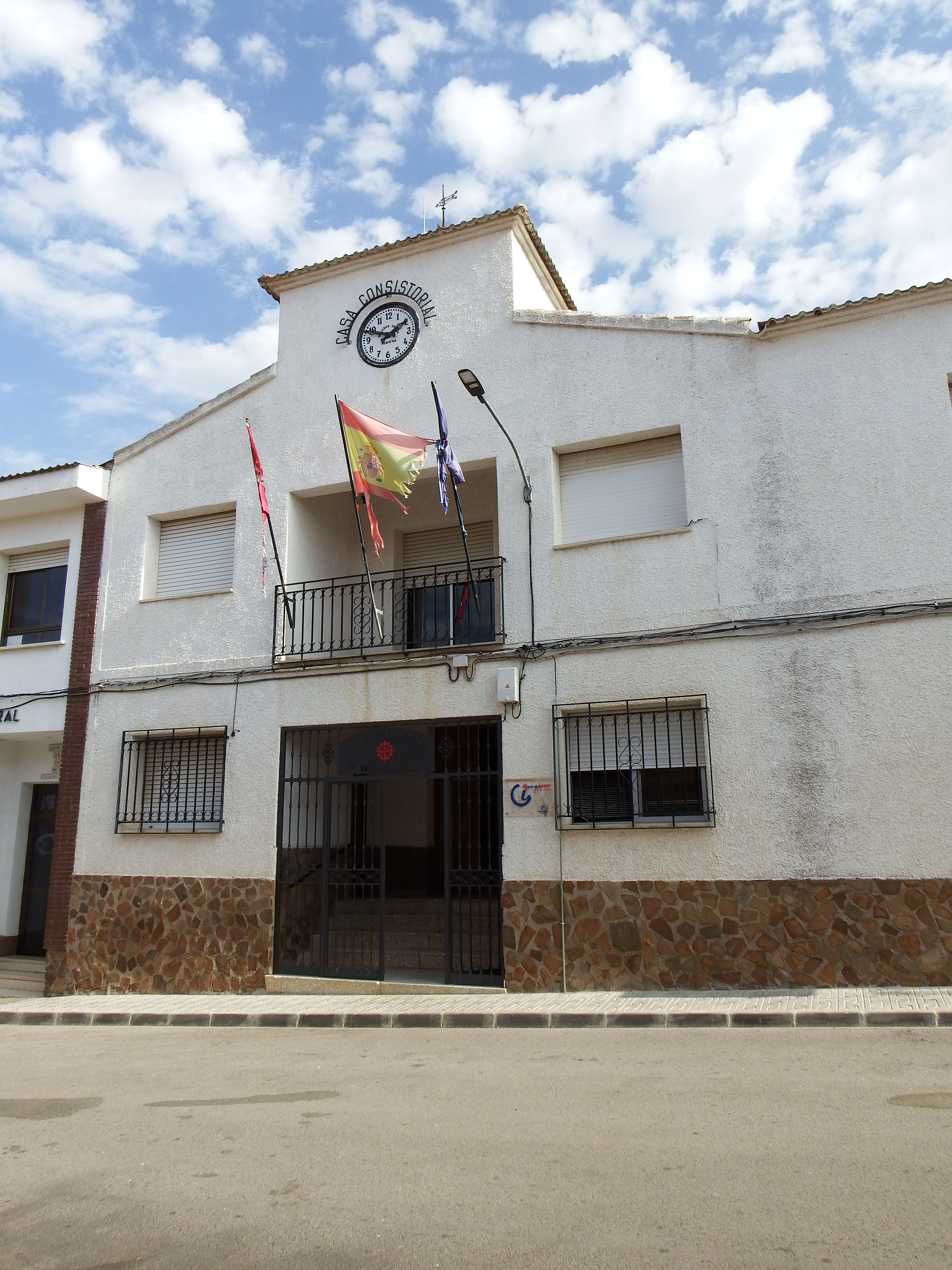
- Town hall

- Coat of arms

- Location in Spain
- Coordinates: 38°37′N 3°55′W
- Country: Spain
- Autonomous community: Castile-La Mancha
- Province: Ciudad Real

Government
  - Mayor: Cándido Montoya García

Area
  - Total: 109.25 km^{2} (42.18 sq mi)

Population (2025-01-01)
  - Total: 261
  - Density: 2.39/km^{2} (6.19/sq mi)
- Time zone: UTC+1 (CET)
  - Summer (DST): UTC+2 (CEST)
- Postal code: 13379

Villanueva de San Carlos is a municipality in the province of Ciudad Real, Castile-La Mancha, Spain. It has a population of 382.
