= Alcubillas =

- Municipality
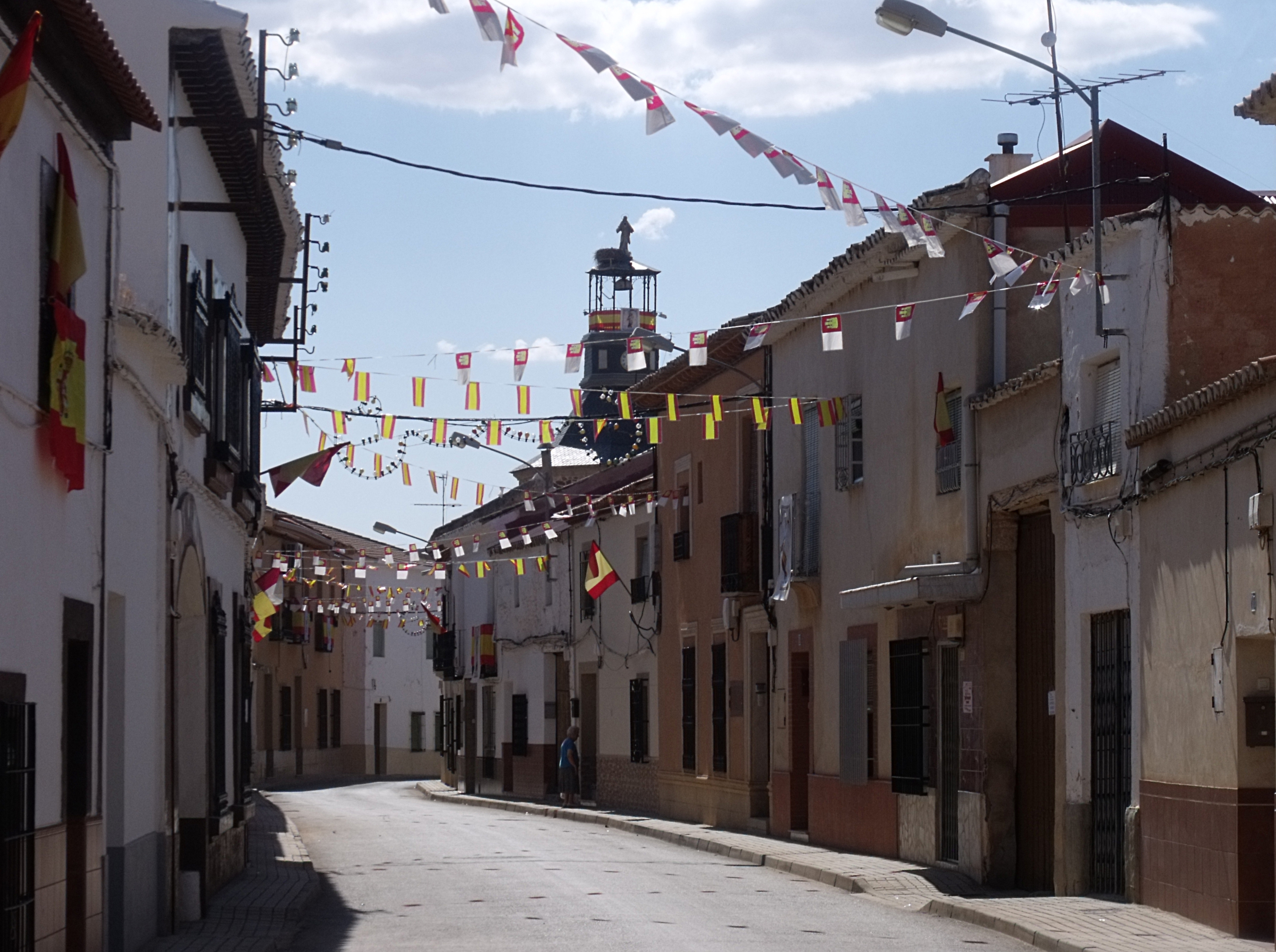
- Street of Alcubillas

- Coat of arms

- Location within Spain
- Coordinates: 38°45′08.3″N 3°08′04.7″W
- Country: Spain
- A. Community: Castilla-La Mancha
- Province: Ciudad Real

Government
  - Mayor: Marco Antonio Navas

Area
  - Total: 47.46 km^{2} (18.32 sq mi)

Population (January 1, 2021)
  - Total: 472
  - Density: 9.945/km^{2} (25.76/sq mi)
- Time zone: UTC+01:00 (CET)
- Postal code: 13391
- Area code: 13008
- Website: Official website

Alcubillas is a municipality located in the province of Ciudad Real, Castile-La Mancha, Spain. It has a population of 472.
