= Solana del Pino =

Solana del Pino Solana
- Village
- Flag Coat of arms

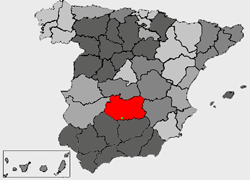
- Coordinates: 38°28′N 4°32′W
- Country: Spain
- Autonomous community: Castile-La Mancha
- Inhabited since: Paleolithic Era

Area
  - Total: 17.425 km^{2} (6.728 sq mi)
- Elevation: 743 m (2,438 ft)

Population (2025-01-01)
  - Total: 333

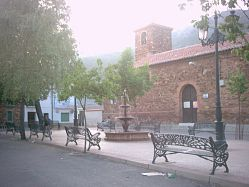
Sierra Morena square in Solana del Pino

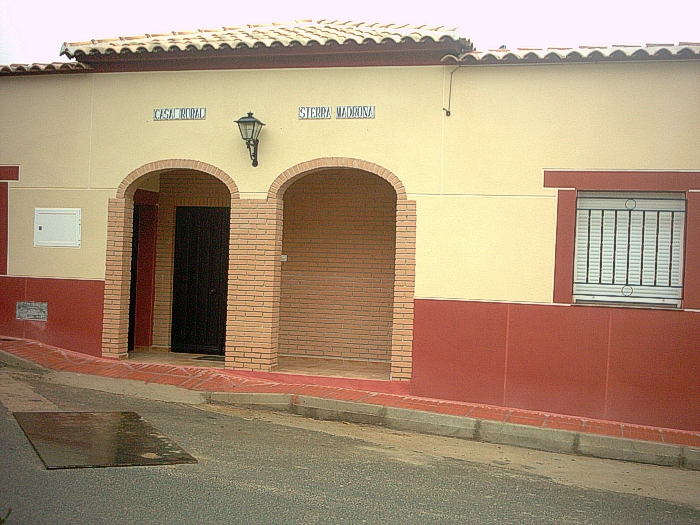
Casa rural (cottage Inn) at Solana del Pino

Solana del Pino is a small village in the province of Ciudad Real, Spain, near the Sierra Madrona and Jaén province borders.

See list of municipalities in Ciudad Real province.
