= Horcajo de los Montes =

Coordinates: 39°19′N 4°39′W

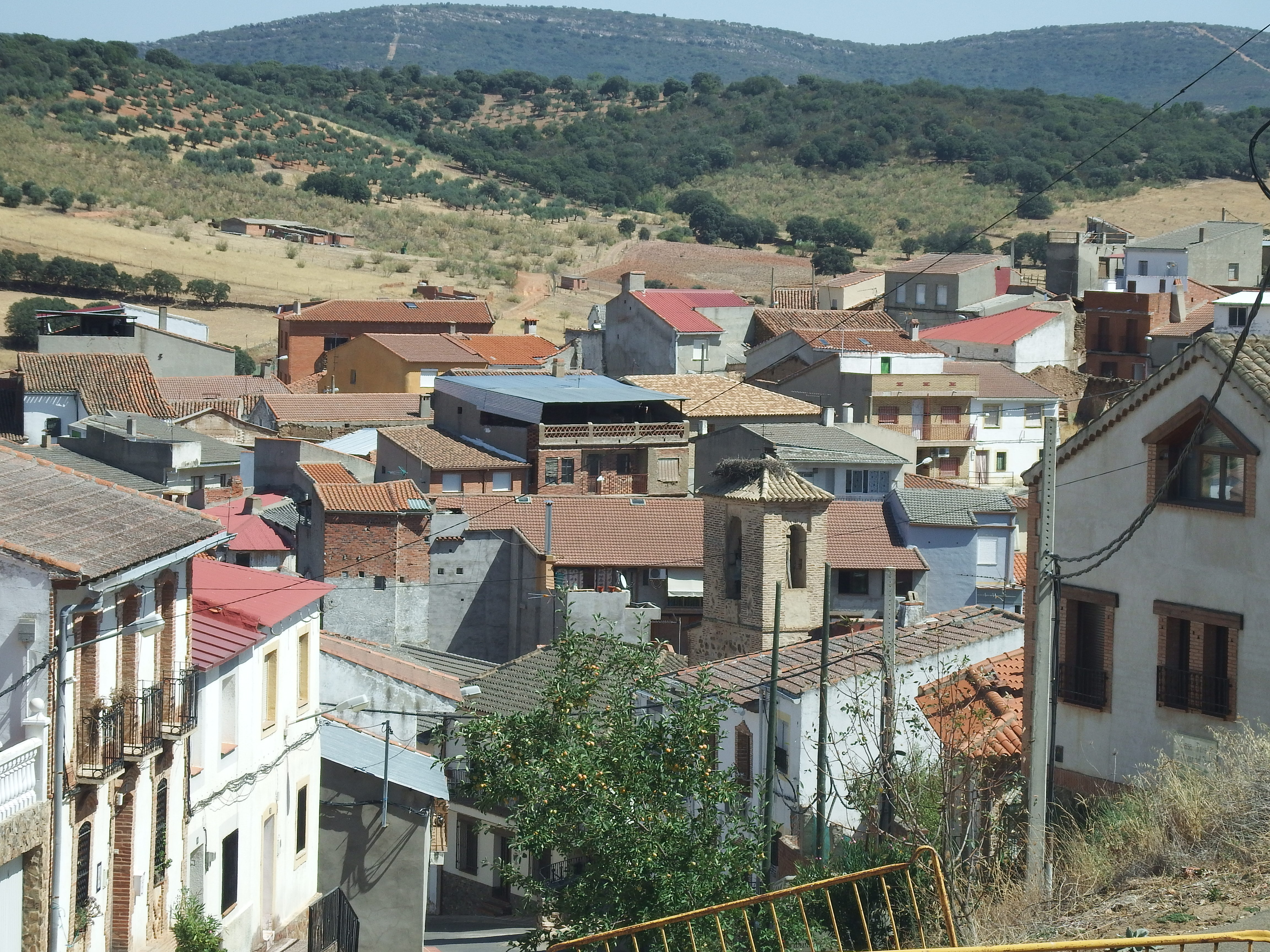
Horcajo de los Montes Rooftops

Coat of arms of Horcajo de los Montes

Horcajo de los Montes is a municipality in Ciudad Real, Castile-La Mancha, Spain. It has a population of 1,030.
