= Fontanarejo =

Municipality in Ciudad Real, Castile-La Mancha, Spain

Coordinates: 39°13′N 4°31′W

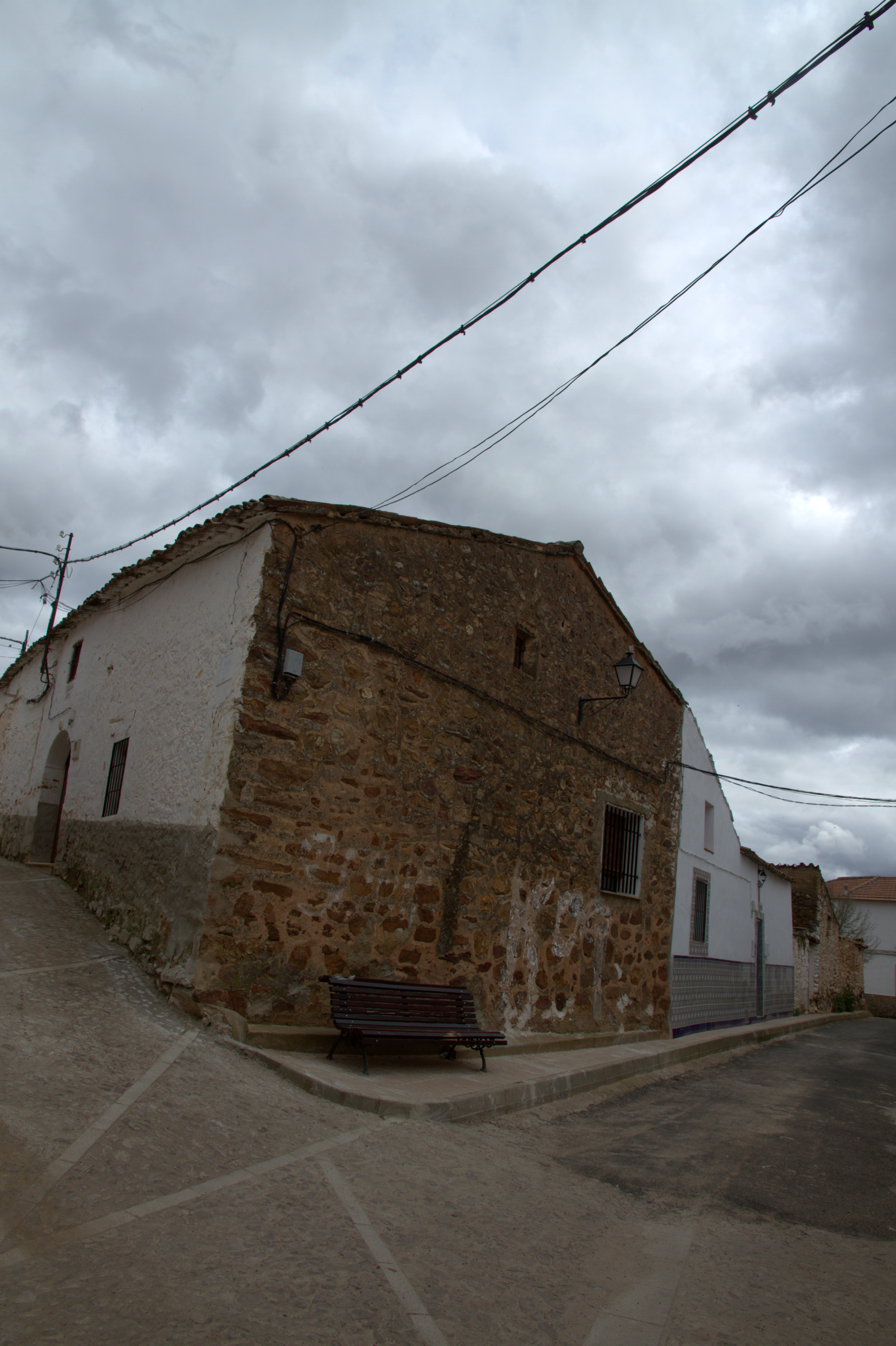
View of Fuente Street, at the height of number 11, in Fontanarejo, Ciudad Real, Spain.

Flag of Fontanarejo

Coat of arms of Fontanarejo

Fontanarejo is a municipality in Ciudad Real, Castile-La Mancha, Spain. It has a population of 348.
