= Navas de Estena =

Coordinates: 39°30′N 4°31′W

Flag of Navas de Estena

Coat of arms of Navas de Estena

Navas de Estena is a municipality in Ciudad Real, Castile-La Mancha, Spain. It has a population of 269.

Almost the whole of the Navas de Estena district lies within Cabañeros National Park. The Boquerón gorge of the River Estena, located about 800 metres from the settlement, is within the park and supports distinctive riparian and montane vegetation. The gorge's microclimate allows the growth of species such as yew, alder and holly, as well as royal fern (Osmunda regalis) and small peat-forming areas. The landscape is characterised by steep terrain and relatively high humidity compared with surrounding areas.
