= Cabezarados =

Coordinates: 38°51′N 4°17′W

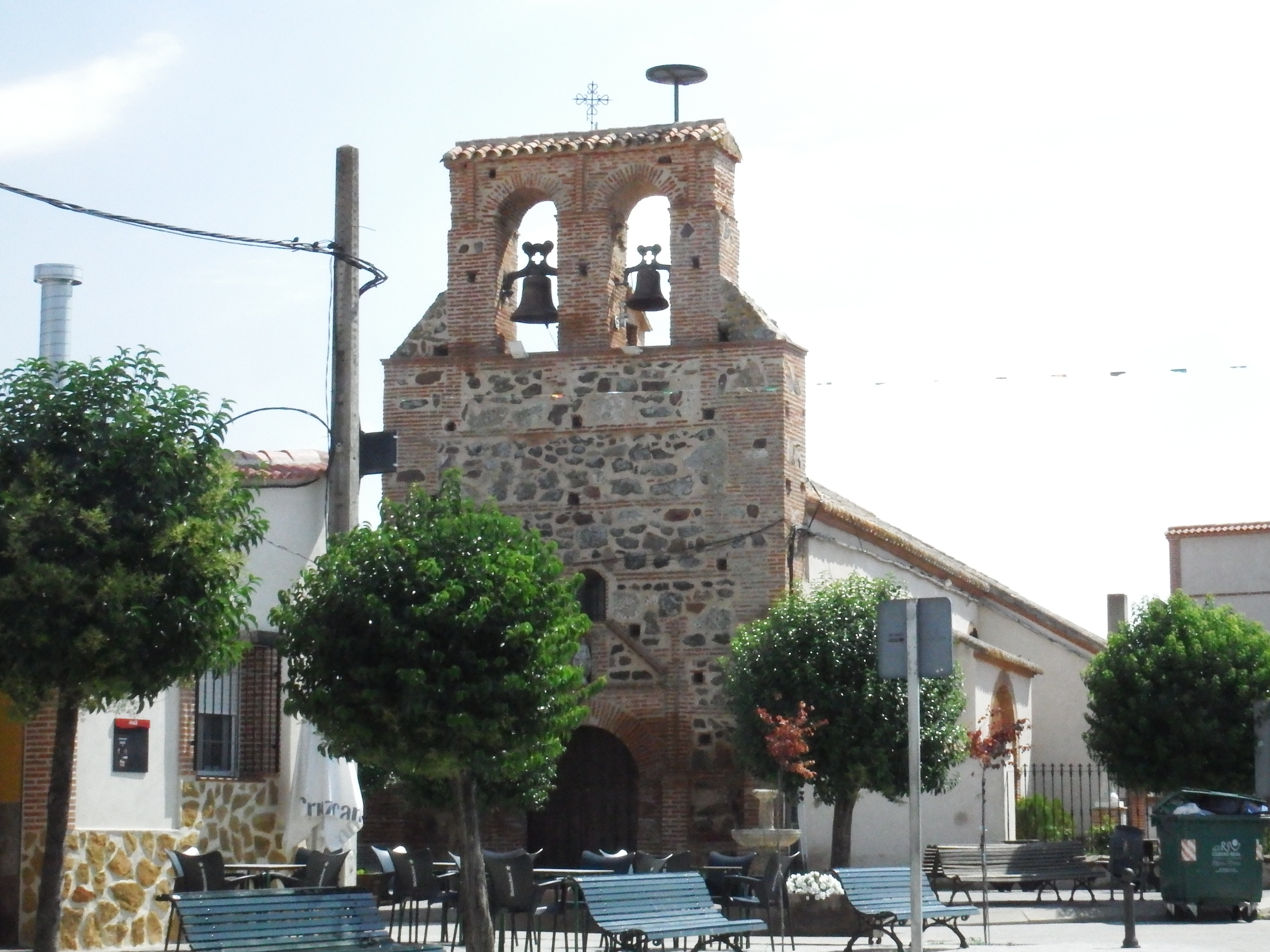
Church of Cabezarados

Coat of arms of Cabezarados

Cabezarados is a municipality in Ciudad Real, Castile-La Mancha, Spain. It has a population of 379.
