= Los Cortijos =

Coordinates: 39°18′51″N 04°03′07″W

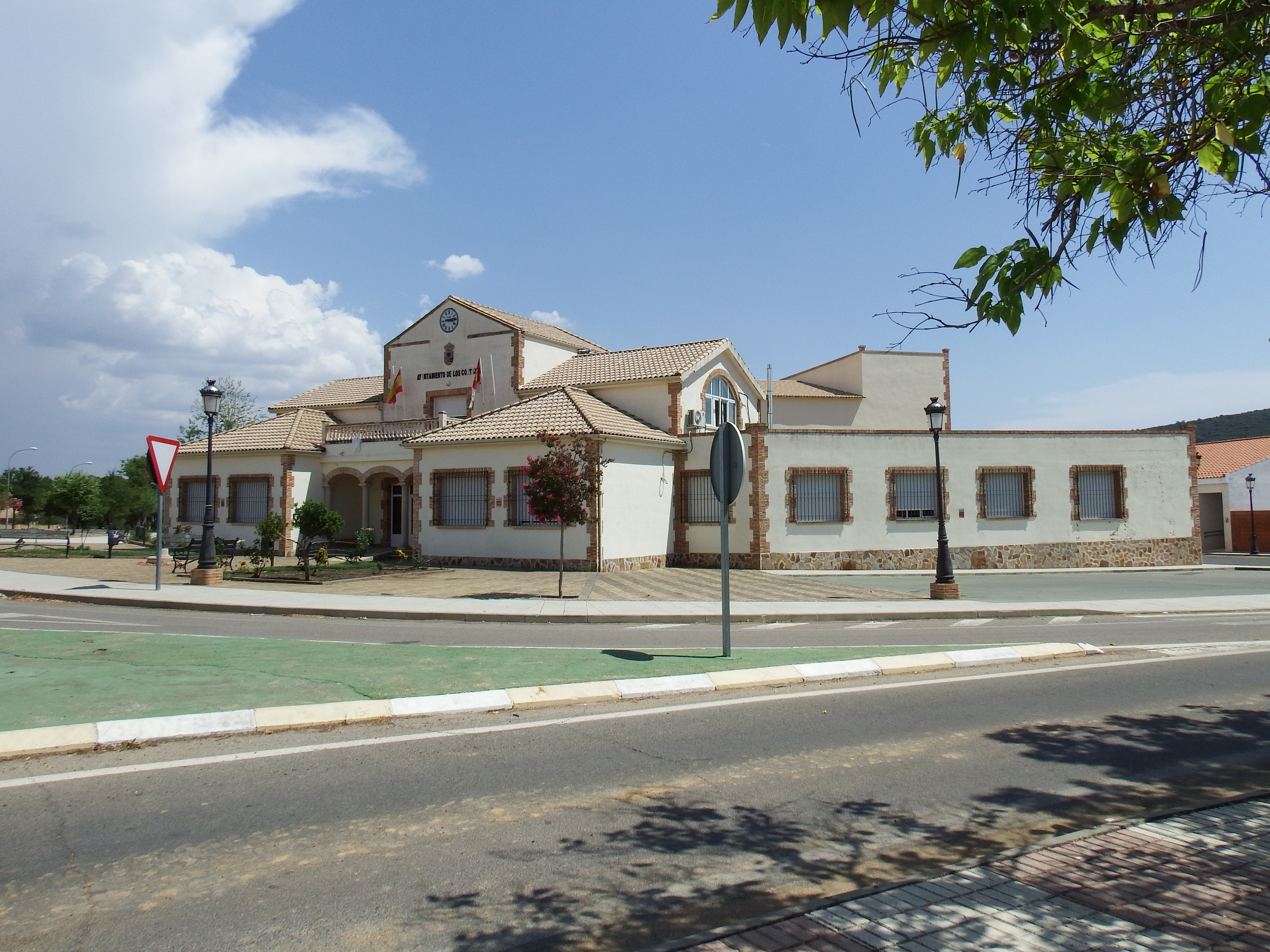
Town Hall of Los Cortijos

Coat of arms of Los Cortijos

Los Cortijos is a municipality in Ciudad Real, Castile-La Mancha, Spain. It has a population of 1,026.
