= Guadalmez =

Coordinates: 38°43′N 4°58′W

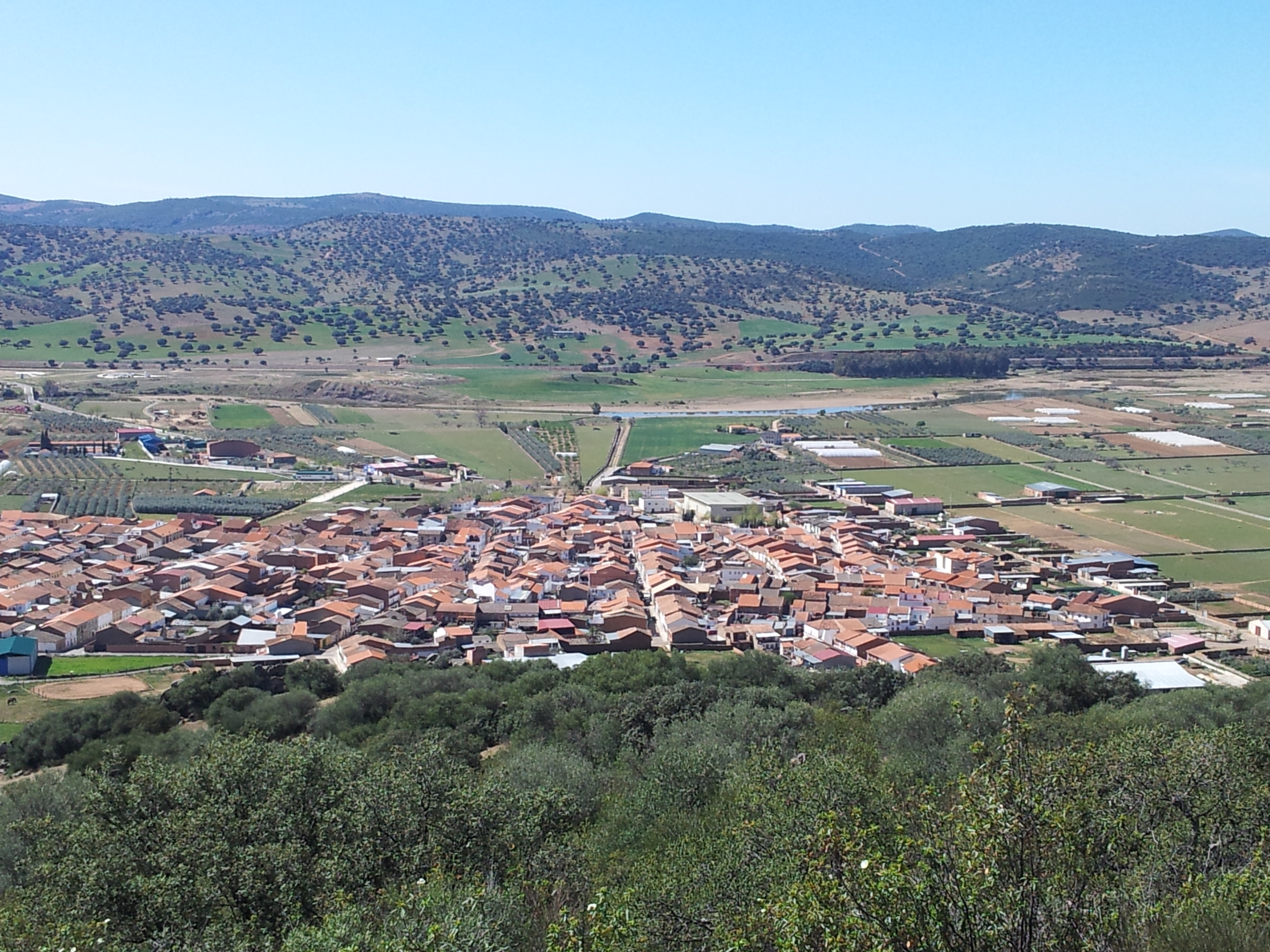

Flag of Guadalamez

Coat of arms of Guadalmez

Guadalmez is a municipality in Ciudad Real, Castile-La Mancha, Spain. It has a population of 996.
