= El Robledo =

Coordinates: 39°13′N 4°17′W

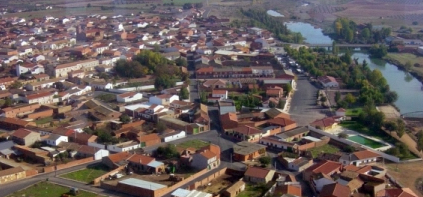

Flag of El Robledo

Coat of arms of El Robledo

El Robledo is a municipality in Ciudad Real, Castile-La Mancha, Spain. It has a population of 1,084.
