= Los Pozuelos de Calatrava =

Coordinates: 38°50′00″N 3°51′00″W

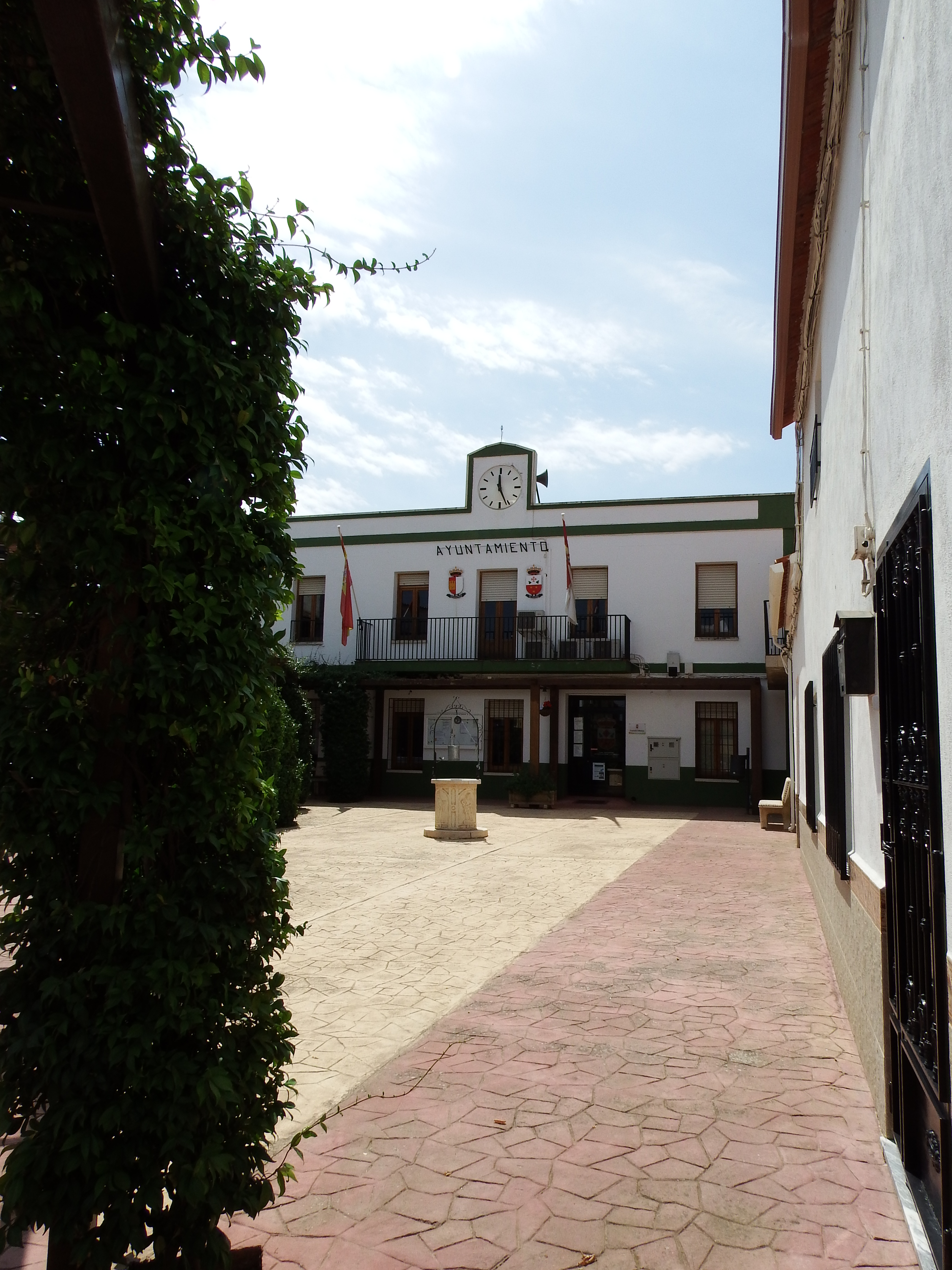
Town hall of Los Pozuelos de Calatrava

Coat of arms of Loz Pozuelos de Calatrava

Los Pozuelos de Calatrava is a municipality in Ciudad Real, Castile-La Mancha, Spain. It has a population of 524.
