= Saceruela =

Municipality in Ciudad Real, Castile-La Mancha, Spain

Coordinates: 38°57′N 4°36′W

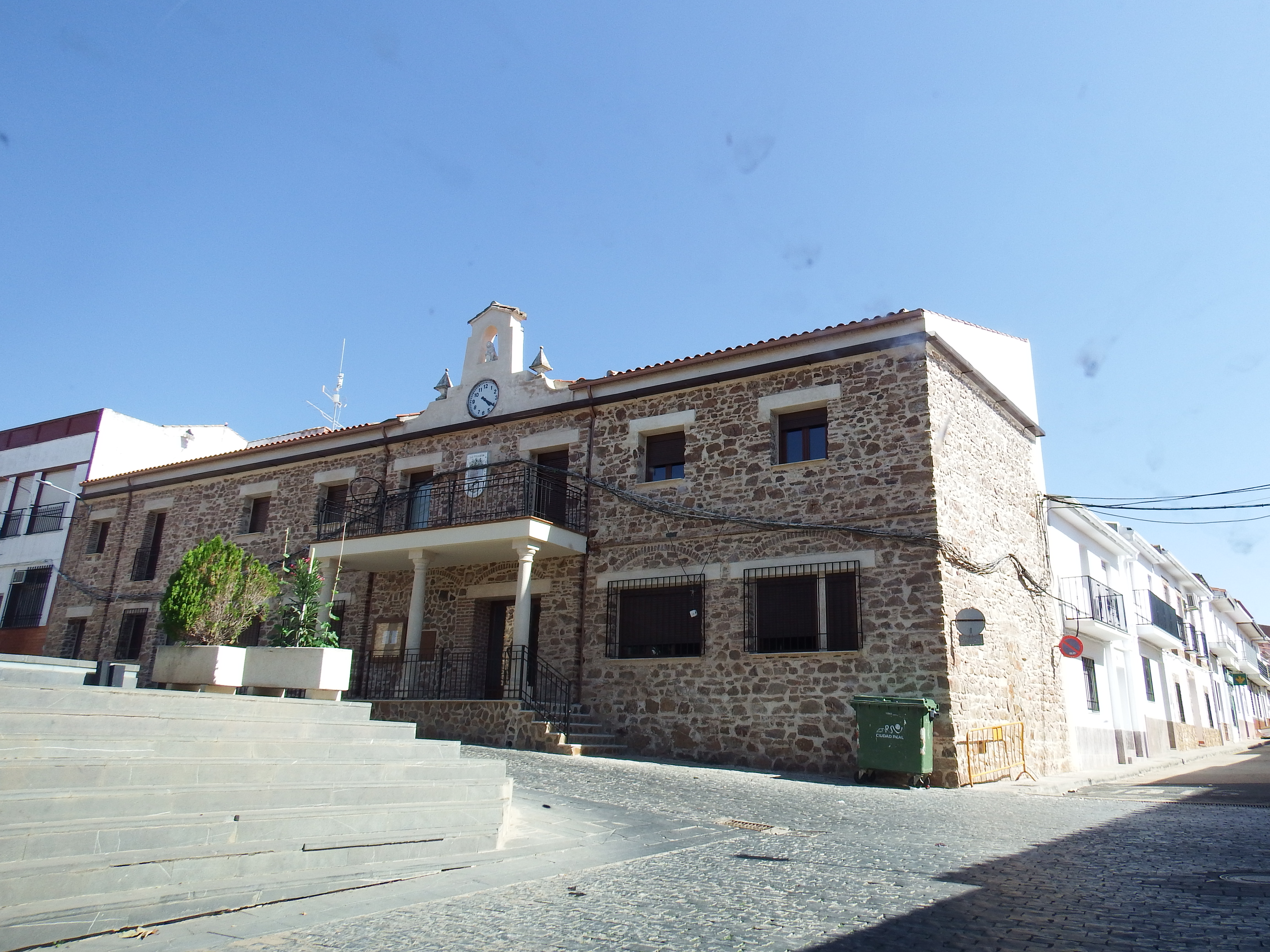
Town hall

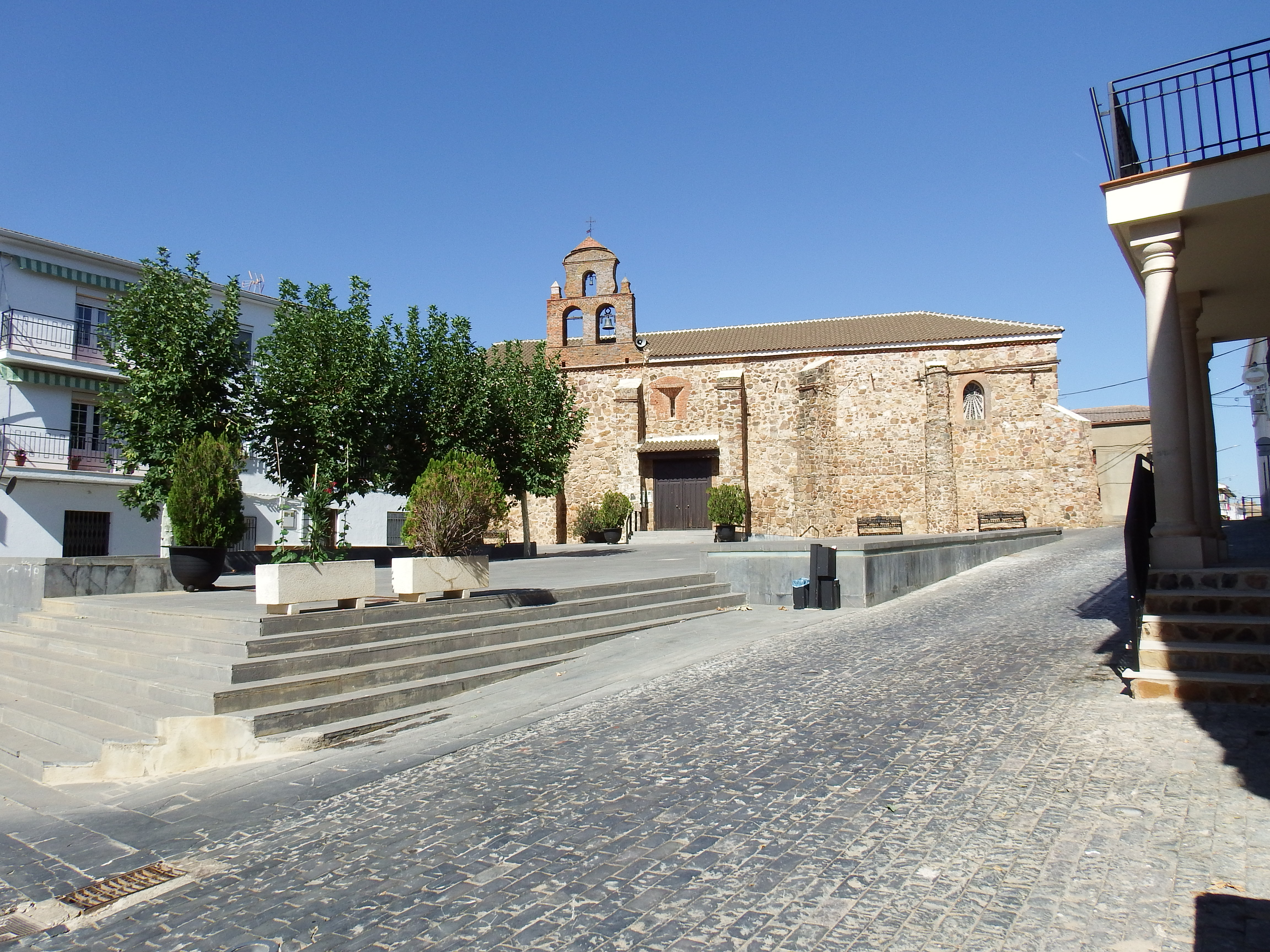
Church of Our Lady of the Crosses (Nuestra Señora de las Cruces), located in Constitution Square.

Flag of Saceruela

Coat of arms of Saceruela

Saceruela is a municipality in Ciudad Real, Castile-La Mancha, Spain.
