= Villar del Pozo =

- Municipality
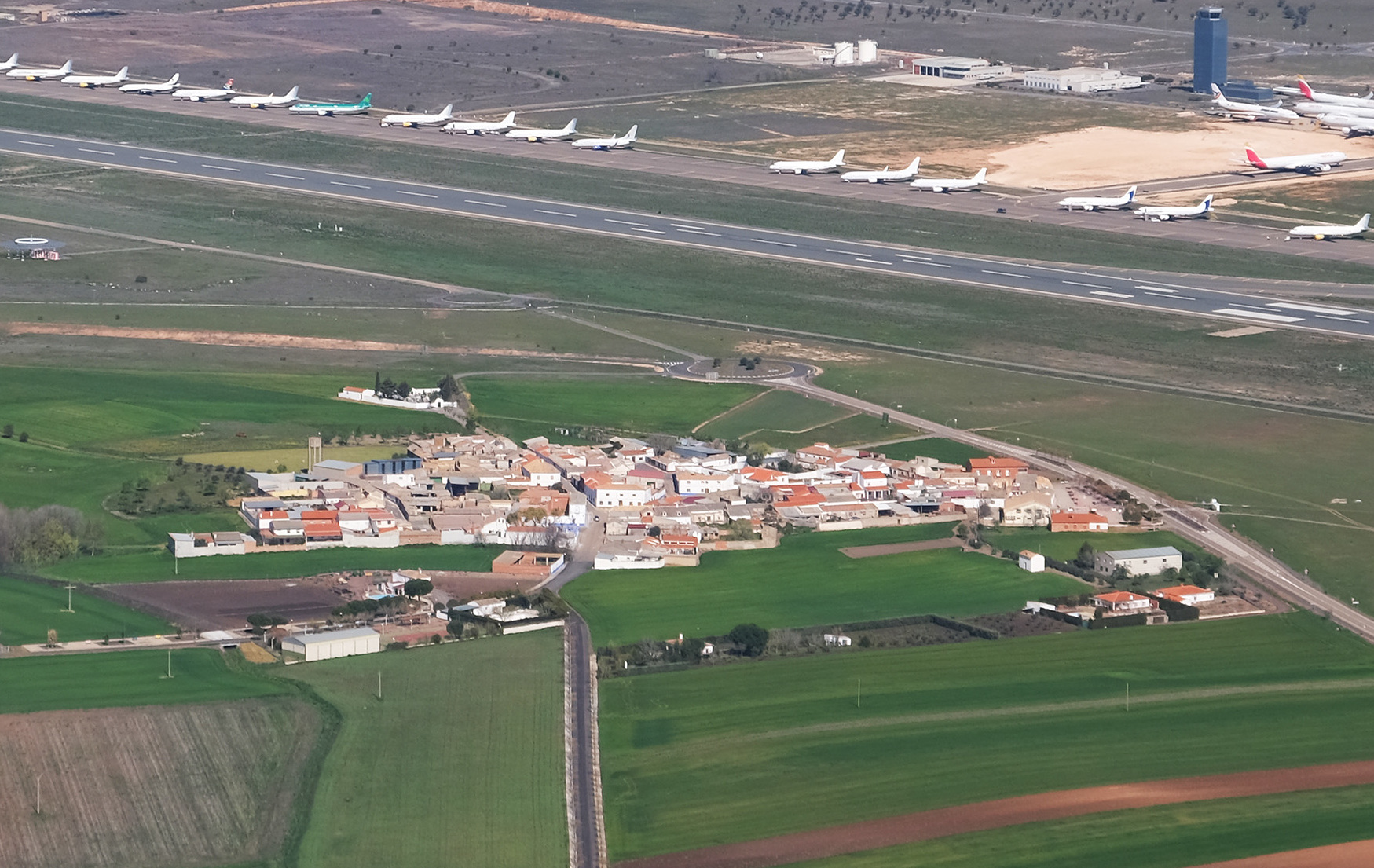
- Aerial view of Villar del Pozo, located near the Ciudad Real Airport.

- Flag Coat of arms

- Location within Castilla-La Mancha Location within Spain
- Coordinates: 38°50′57″N 3°57′48″W
- Country: Spain
- Autonomous community: Castilla–La Mancha
- Province: Ciudad Real

Area
  - Total: 13.23 km^{2} (5.11 sq mi)

Population (2025-01-01)
  - Total: 45
  - Density: 3.4/km^{2} (8.8/sq mi)
- Time zone: UTC+1 (CET)
  - Summer (DST): UTC+2 (CEST)

Villar del Pozo is a municipality of Spain located in the province of Ciudad Real, Castilla–La Mancha. The municipality spans across a total area of 13.14 km^{2} and, as of 1 January 2020, it has a registered population of 61.
