= Cabezarrubias del Puerto =

Municipality in Ciudad Real, Castile-La Mancha, Spain

Coordinates: 38°37′N 4°11′W

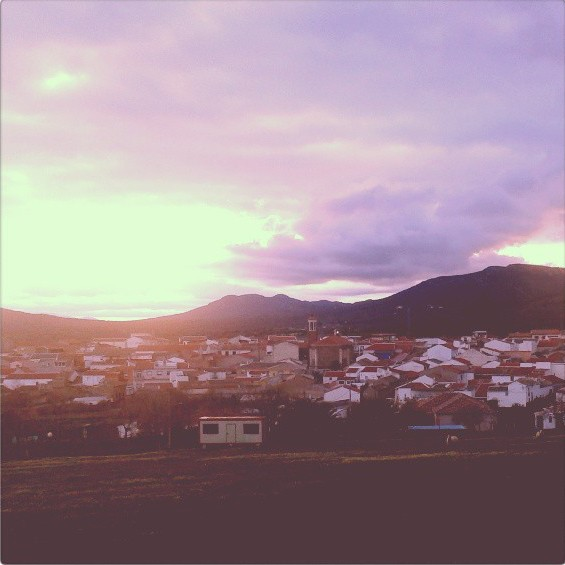
Cabezarrubias del Puerto, A Night Shot

Flag of Cabezarrubias del Puerto

Coat of arms of Cabezarrubias del Puerto

Cabezarrubias del Puerto is a municipality in Ciudad Real, Castile-La Mancha, Spain. It has a population of 624.

In 2026, the town's mayor was Inmaculada Arévalo. The town was badly affected by a storm in early 2026 and city officials met with the provincial Minister of Sustainable Development to discuss damage caused by the storm and the need for upkeep of the municipal water treatment plant.
