= Corral de Calatrava =

Municipality in Castile-La Mancha, Spain

Coordinates: 38°51′N 4°05′W

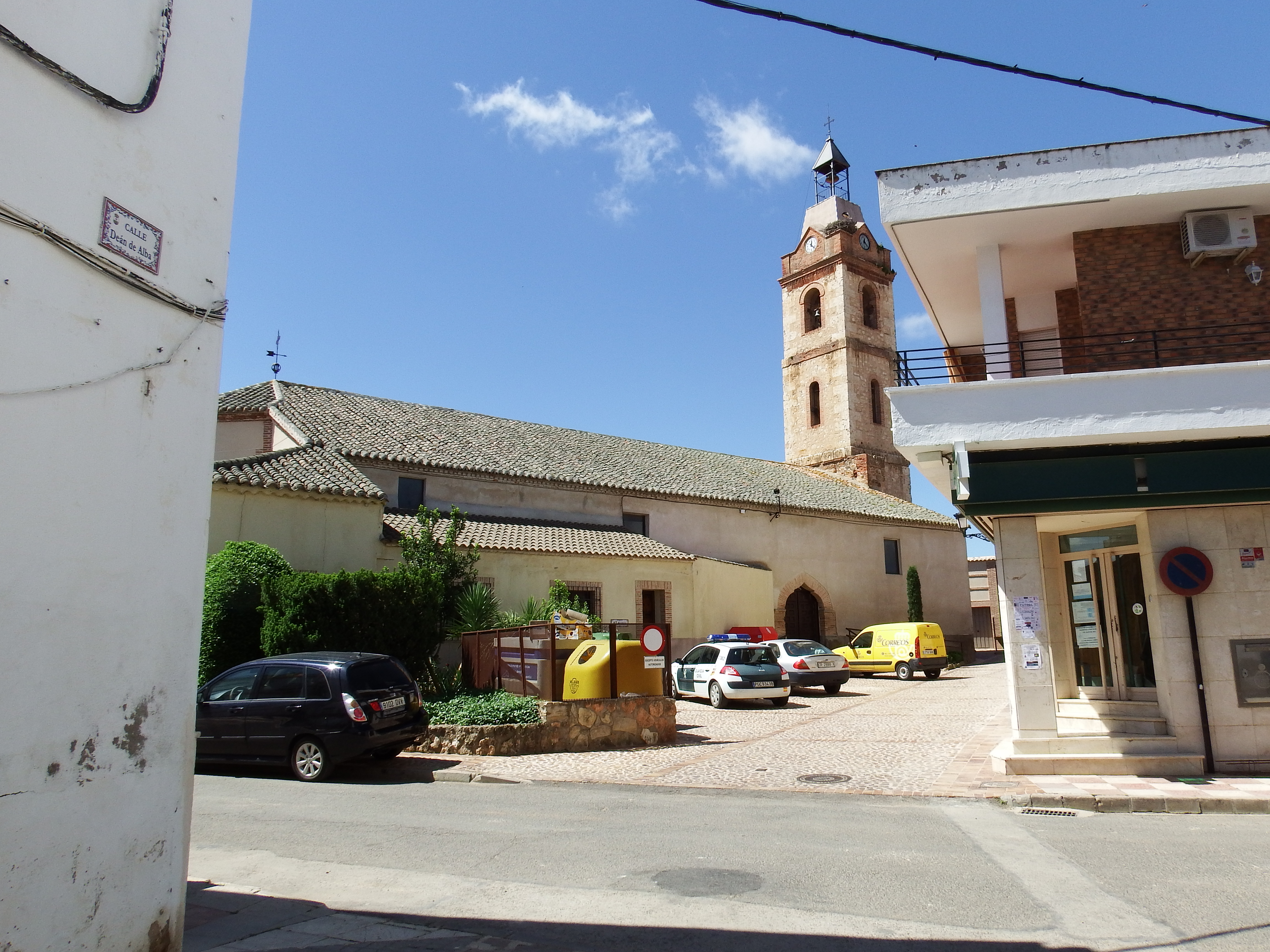
Corral de Calatrava Square

Coat of arms of Corral de Calatrava

Corral de Calatrava is a municipality in Ciudad Real, Castile-La Mancha, Spain. It has a population of 1,272.
