= Germani (Oretania) =

Obscure pre-Roman ancient Spanish people

The Iberian Peninsula in the 3rd century BC

The Germani were an obscure pre-Roman ancient people of the Iberian Peninsula which settled around the 4th century BC in western Oretania, an ancient region corresponding to the south of Ciudad Real and the eastern tip of Badajoz provinces.

== Origins ==
Roman authors believed that a people of mixed Belgic and Germanic descent had somehow migrated to the Iberian Peninsula around the fourth Century BC. They also included people of Celtiberian and native Iberian-Tartessian affiliation.

== Culture ==
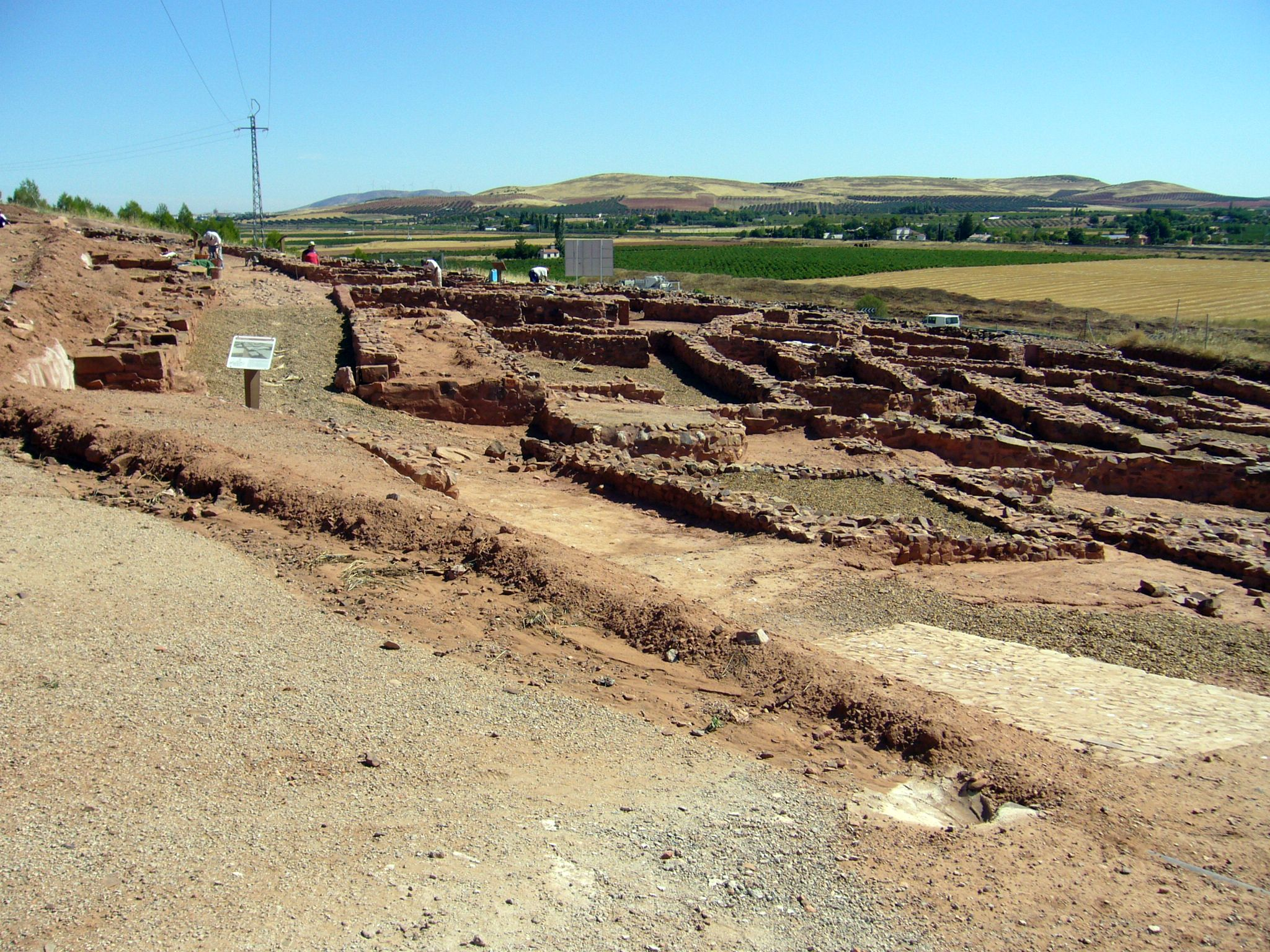
Archaeological site of Cerro de las Cabezas in Valdepeñas

Archaeological evidence retrieved from local Iron Age hillforts such as Alarcos (Ciudad Real) and Cerro de las Cabezas confirm that the material culture of the Germani did not differ from their southeastern Iberian neighbours or from the Celtiberians.

== Location ==
Located to the west of the Olcades, they are credited of founding in western Oretania the towns of Mirobriga (near Capilla, Badajoz), their Capital Orissia or Oria, also designated Oretum Germanorum (Cerro Dominguez, near Granátula de Calatrava – Ciudad Real), Gemella Germanorum (Almagro – Ciudad Real), Lacurris (Alarcos – Ciudad Real), Sisapo (La Bienvenida, Almodóvar – Ciudad Real) and Mentesa Oretana (Villanueva de la Fuente – Ciudad Real).

== History ==
Whether the Germani were clients or allies of the wealthy Iberian Oretani people during the 3rd century BC remains unclear, but they certainly supported the powerful Oretanian king Orison at the Battle of Helicen in 228 BC (Helike in the Greek sources, perhaps Elche de la Sierra, Elche or another Oretanian city) against the Carthaginians under Hamilcar Barca. Orison’s defeat in 227 BC and his signing of an alliance treaty with Carthage, however, caused a major friction between the Oretani and their Germani allies who promptly repudiated its terms, and continued to resist Punic expansion until they were subdued by Hannibal in 221 BC. They were certainly amongst the Oretani troops sent to Africa at the outbreak of the Second Punic War. The Germani appear to have adopted a less hostile stance towards Rome, in 156 BC were included into Hispania Citerior Province and were gradually assimilated by the Oretani.

== See also ==
- Germani
- Germania
- List of the Pre-Roman peoples of the Iberian Peninsula
- Proto-Germanic language

== Sources ==
- Ángel Montenegro et alii, Historia de España 2 - colonizaciones y formación de los pueblos prerromanos (1200-218 a.C), Editorial Gredos, Madrid (1989) ISBN 84-249-1386-8
- Francisco Burillo Motoza, Los Celtíberos – Etnias y Estados, Crítica, Grijalbo Mondadori, S.A., Barcelona (1998, revised edition 2007) ISBN 84-7423-891-9
- Juan Pereira Siesto (coord.), Prehistoria y Protohistoria de la Meseta Sur (Castilla-La Mancha), Biblioteca Añil n.º 31, ALMUD, Ediciones de Castilla-La Mancha, Ciudad Real (2007) ISBN 84-934858-5-3
