= Cerro de las Cabezas =

Archaeological site in Valdepeñas, Spain

Coordinates: 38.709°N 3.420°W

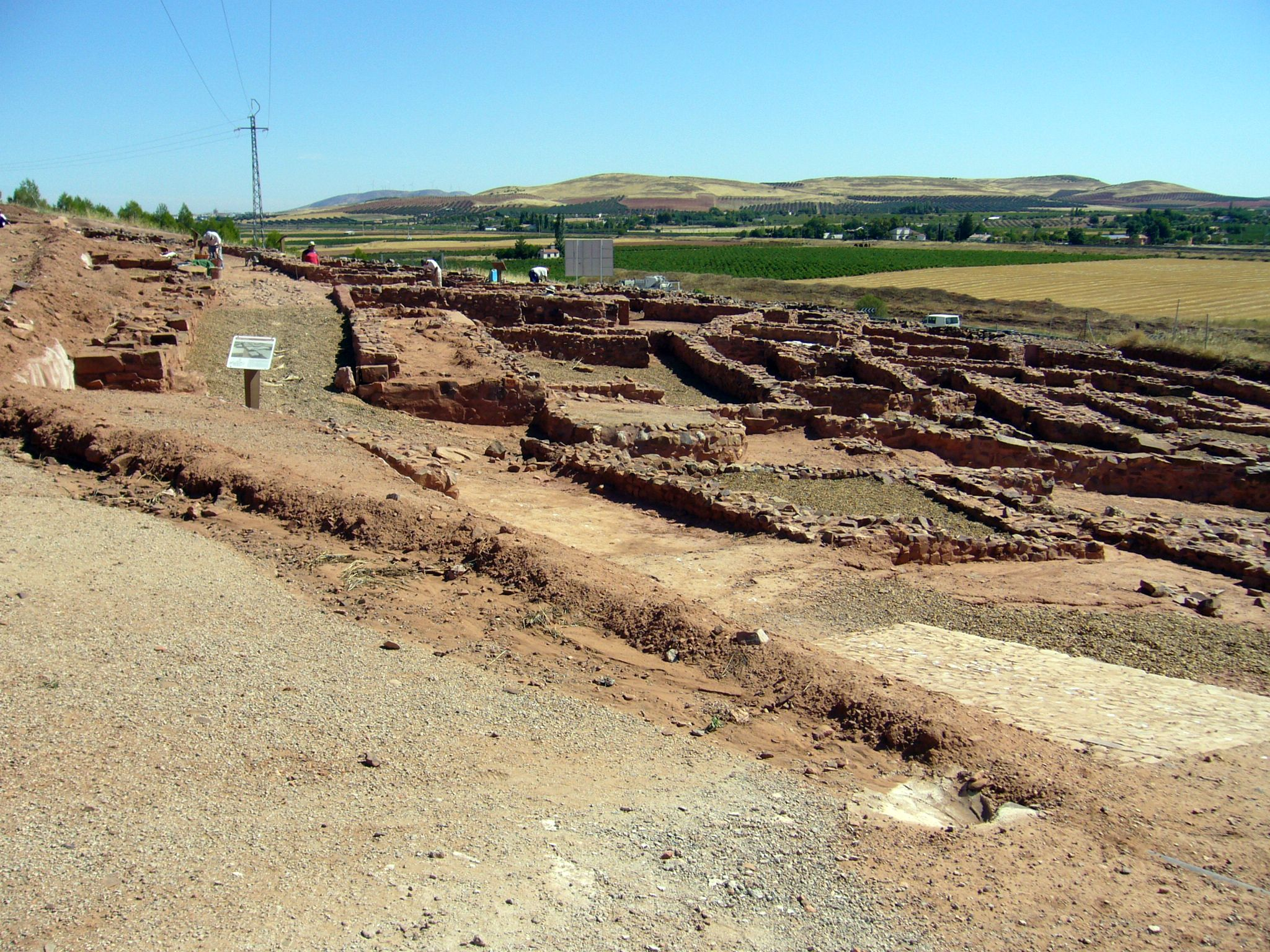
Partial view of one of the consolidated sections of the archaeological excavation at Cerro de las Cabezas near Valdepeñas (Ciudad Real) in Spain.

Cerro de las Cabezas is an archaeological site of Ibero-Oretani origin, located about 8 km south of the present-day city of Valdepeñas, in the province of Ciudad Real (exit 208 of the A-4 southbound, with no signposting northbound). The site is located on a hill approximately 800 metres high, and covers the area between the summit and the eastern slope, an area that has been partially destroyed by the construction of the Autovía A-4 that links Madrid with Andalusia.

The site was inhabited from the 6th to the 2nd century BC. Excavation began at the base of the hill. It is a walled city, of which the foundations of the houses and the plinths of the outer wall, made of large blocks of stone that fit perfectly together, have been preserved in their entirety. On top of these would have been the actual walls, made of adobe, which have now disappeared. The location of the site is due to strategic reasons for the control of the route between the Guadalquivir marshes, and therefore Andalusia, and the Meseta Sur.

This site has nothing to do with the city of Edeba, as some believe, whose existence is attested by the inscription on a Roman decempondo (weight measure) from the time of the Emperor Trajan, discovered, as Eusebio Vasco states, in the Virgen de la Cabeza area, on the road from Valdepeñas to Torrenueva, 11 km south of Valdepeñas and 1 km north of Torrenueva, at the end of the 19th century.

== Site and interpretation centre ==
The archaeological excavations carried out have revealed a large number and wealth of pottery remains with drawings made using stamping techniques, metal utensils for domestic use, oil, wine...

In October 2010, the remains of two decapitated children's bodies were found in what must have been the main street. It was thought that they may have been a human sacrifice to found the extension of the city towards the river. Four years later, during anthropological analysis, it was determined that they were two adults between 30 and 50 years old. According to press reports, it is believed that they may have been thieves or enemies of the town.

Next to the site, there is a cultural interpretation centre with audiovisual material and models.

== Excavation processes ==
The archaeological excavation began with small test pits in 1984 and 1985, with the support of the Bernardo Balbuena IES in Valdepeñas. However, in 1986, due to the construction of the southern motorway, the necessary impetus was given to carry out the excavation. Two intense campaigns were carried out, which confirmed the importance of the site itself, so that the route of the motorway was diverted, managing to conserve around 20,000 m^{2}.

The second phase of excavation began in 1995, in a joint effort by the Junta de Comunidades de Castilla-La Mancha and Valdepeñas Town Council. In this phase, archaeological processes alternated with conservation processes. Excavation efforts focused on the southern wall, allowing the discovery and documentation of a large part of the defensive structures of the wall in this area, including a series of bastions and one of the main gates of the city. Successive archaeological excavation campaigns have brought to light an area of approximately 14,000 m^{2}of the Iberian city, barely 10% of the total area of the site.

In the other excavated area of the site, in the North Urban Area, the urban planning had different characteristics to the area of the South Wall.

In 2010, the interventions were carried out, mainly organised by Valdepeñas Town Council, through intensive archaeology courses. To facilitate the excavation and restoration work, a series of infrastructures were built to complement and give life to the archaeological site.

Thus, annexed to the site is a 2-hectare plot of land on which the Valdepeñas Town Council has built the Interpretation Centre and the Iberian City. The plot is bordered to the north by the excavations, and to the south by an access lane to the Archaeological Ensemble, with the "Cerro las Cabezas Interpretation Centre" and the subsequent visit to the Iberian City as the central point for visits to the site.

== Sanctuary ==
There is evidence of an entrance sanctuary at the north gate. The existence of a second sanctuary in the southern wall has also been suggested. From a territorial point of view, the community of Cerro de las Cabezas would undoubtedly have been related to the rock sanctuary of Collado de los Jardines, in Despeñaperros, to which devotees from other Oretani cities such as Cástulo or Giribaile would have come.

== Necropolis ==
It is located just 222 metres east of the eastern walls of the settlement, in a plain area that is clearly visible from the Cerro. This area was discovered in 2013 thanks to an impact prevention and archaeological heritage protection procedure during the installation of a high-voltage power line. So far, only a few burial sites had been detected within the settlement, but not a funerary area associated with it.

A total of 14 cremation tombs and two constructions clearly linked to the functioning of the necropolis were found in this area: an ustrinum (a place where corpses were burnt) and a tumulus which houses six of the documented tombs. The other tombs discovered were buried in the vicinity of the constructions described.

Tomb 1 is considered to be the best preserved. It corresponds to a cremation burial in an urn, with associated grave goods such as fusayoles, fibulae, weapons and ceramic vessels. What makes this tomb special is that it has imported grave goods, an Italian terra sigillata slab sealed at the L. Titivs factory and dated to between 15/40 AD. It also provides valuable information on the funerary rituals and cultural customs practised in Roman and Iberian times. The fact that a funerary urn with cremated human remains has been found suggests that the Iberian funerary rite of cremation was still practised in the early years of our era in the southern part of the Plateau. Furthermore, the presence of grave goods such as fusayolas, fibulae and weapons suggests that this was a burial belonging to an important person or one with a certain social status.

== Building materials ==
The site follows the general dynamic of the rest of the Iberian world. As far as materials and techniques are concerned, the main materials used in construction are stone such as local quartzite, adobe and rammed earth, as well as reinforcements of plant materials, although there are some exceptions.

Most of the materials used for their construction were extracted from the same area of the hill, which is why we see that much use is made of quartzite and other types of stones found in the area. However, there are also materials in the hill that have been transported from other places, as is the case of the complete floor of a house made of green slate that is thought to have been extracted in Sierra Morena for the floor of a house of some importance, due to the distance between the hill and the place of origin of the slate. The people of Oretani had a great mastery of pottery, as evidenced by the extensive use of adobe and rammed earth made from the mud of the river Jabalón.

As for the construction techniques used at the site, we can see that the foundations were made of stone masonry, and on top of this we find more fragile materials such as rammed earth or plant materials. It is worth mentioning that most of the walls are blind and quite thick, designed to retain heat. In addition, they were painted with red or white pigments on most occasions. The only openings found in the walls are the doors, which were made of wooden planks attached to a trunk that served as a shaft, which was connected to the wooden lintels at the top of the door. The roofs were flat, and their composition consisted first of log beams whose purpose was to support a roof of reeds that was then covered with a layer of vegetation, which could sometimes be made of skins to waterproof the construction. In order to give greater stability to the dwellings, vertical logs were often used in the middle of the rooms to act as pillars. The floors, for the most part, were made of earth, as were the streets, although there were exceptions in some houses whose floors were made of stone or even of the aforementioned slate.

== Stamps ==
Among other types of decoration from the Iberian world (varnishes, figures or patterns), the ceramics produced at Cerro de las Cabezas include a series of stamps placed on the different pieces. These could have been made with pieces of plant or animal origin, such as deer antlers or other types of fauna, with the image of the desired figure at one end, and when printed on the pottery, prior to the drying and firing process, the negative would remain on the piece. This decoration by means of stamping has only been seen in the Iberian world at this site at Cerro de las Cabezas, leading researchers to believe that it was a phenomenon unique to this settlement or that samples have not yet been found at other sites.

Possible reasons for the emergence of this type of decoration could be due either to contact with the Eastern world, via trade with the Phoenicians and the adoption of much of their culture through their influence on the Iberian world, or as a local emergence of the Oretani people, although we only have evidence of its use at this site, being present in the vast majority of existing pieces, with more than one hundred stamps discovered to date.

Within the multitude of variants that have survived to the present day, it is true that there are certain figures that are repeated throughout many pieces, such as geometric elements, flowers, including the lotus flower between five points, which in the Phoenician world represents the goddess Astarte; and fantastic beings, such as the "butcher" (a figure that may represent a wolf or a lion, but of which there is no absolute certainty) or what is believed to be a griffin and which may be related to a ring found at this same site, in which the shape of a griffin with three stars can be seen, which bears a certain similarity to the symbol used on the coins of the Iberian settlement of Castulo.

The meaning of these figures is still under discussion among experts, although the most plausible theories suggest that it is simply some kind of decoration, although theories that maintain that it is some kind of mark of authorship, ownership or a simple language or form of communication, of which there is no evidence, are not ruled out.

== Society ==
There are no specific studies of the society at this site, but all the evidence suggests that it is similar to what is known from other parts of the Iberian world. The site has been inhabited for many centuries, involving changes in society that can be discerned in the archaeological record. Recent excavations provide an idea of what society might have been like at this time. More than one house has been found that could have belonged to aristocratic families, so there would have been a system of hierarchy and social differentiation, with the aristocratic elites having power over other classes. Beneath them were freemen such as craftsmen, potters, herdsmen, and warriors. However, the majority of the population would be peasants, and below them, slaves and servants. Some peasants would even live in huts outside the walls.

Surrounding the settlement is the wall and its various watchtowers, proof that it was a warrior society. The weapons associated with male burials of high social status also serve to identify this society with the world of warfare.

In addition, they would have had a planned and complex urban planning system that would have included the layout of streets and production areas, and the creation of public works. On this site there are several bastions for the storage of grain production, demonstrating the level of (perhaps centralised) administration of the resources they managed. The houses are very well prepared, in them we can find different rooms such as the kitchen and inside them different elements in which the ovens stand out. Although there were ovens in the individual houses, there were also a series of communal ovens, which had several functions: they served as a meeting place for the women of the village, and also for the women who did not have ovens at home. This settlement was home to highly specialised workers with a high level of technology. Different types of oven have been found depending on the material to be baked (pottery, metal or bread), and different types of mills; for grapes, olives or cereals. The economy of the hill was based on dry farming and ceramics. The most important traders sold their pottery and also used the cereal they cultivated as an exchange commodity. The Cerro de las Cabezas was located in a main passing area for trade routes, and was also a stopping point for travellers. The inhabitants enjoyed the benefits of these medium and long-distance routes, establishing direct connections with the surrounding villages, but also indirect connections with Mediterranean communities. In terms of gender, and extrapolating to the Iberian world in general, the record confirms the distinction in burials. Men were associated with warfare and women with personal care, although with some exceptions such as the famous Lady of Baza. There is not much information on the practice of daily activities. Women worked and lived in the domestic sphere, but enjoyed a public life, as shown in representations of ritual dances.

== Environmental context ==
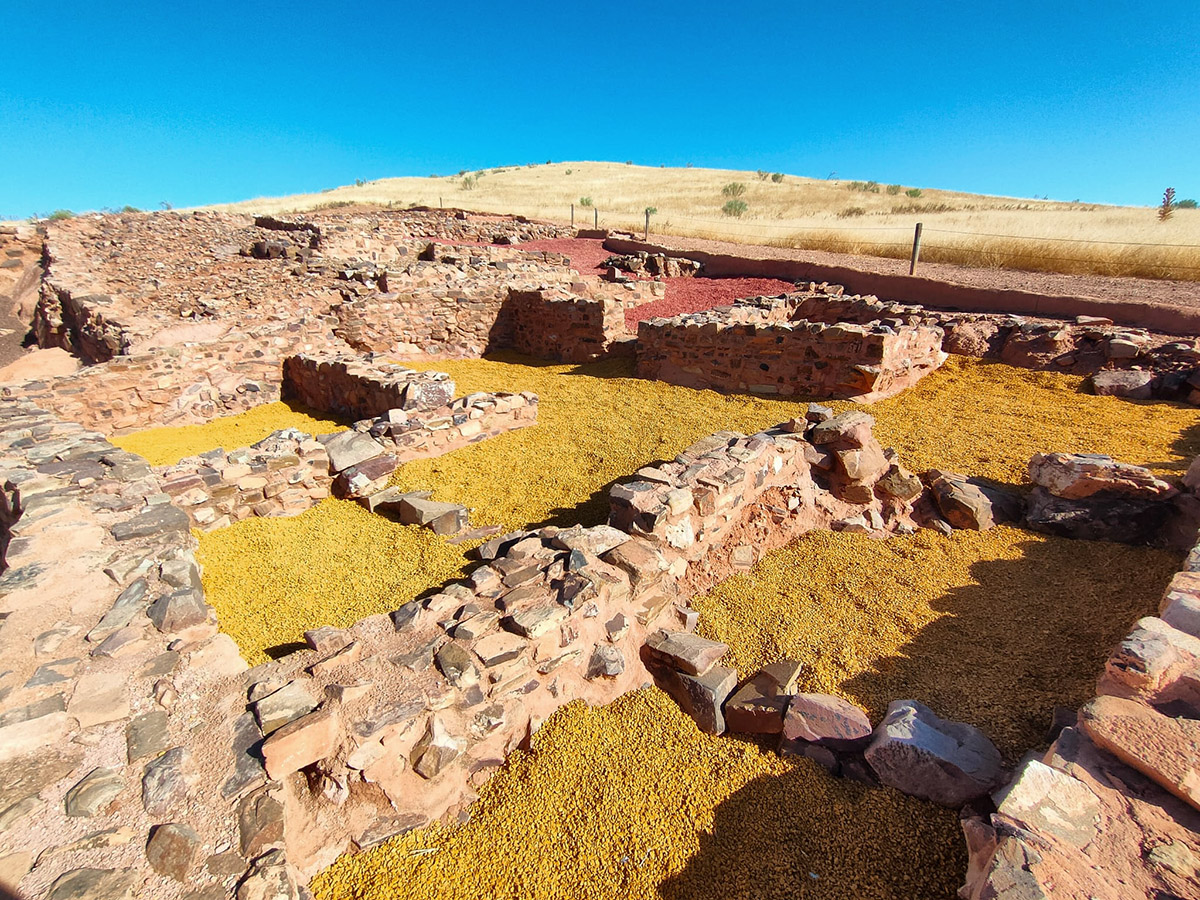
Cerro de las Cabezas site, where the yellow gravestone indicates a cereal area.

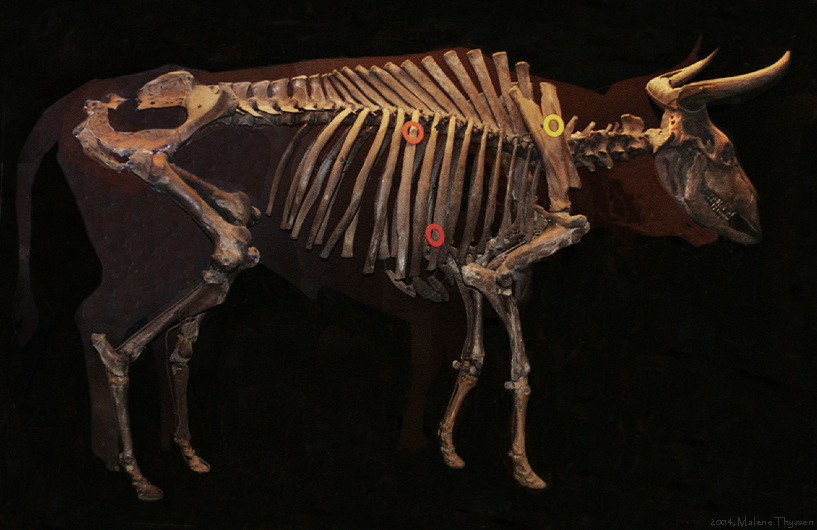
Skeleton of an aurochs

According to several studies carried out in this area, at the time when the people settled in Cerro de las Cabezas, the region had a climate similar to today's, with a Mediterranean climate with mild, rainy winters and hot, dry summers. However, during the Bronze Age, the period when the settlements on Cerro de las Cabezas were established, there was an intensification of aridity in the area due to climatic variability. The predominant vegetation at the time was holm oak and cork oak, suggesting the presence of forests and the exploitation of their resources, such as wood for the construction of dwellings and tools. In addition, evidence has also been found of the presence of olive trees and vineyards, as well as crops such as barley and wheat in the area, suggesting a more developed agriculture, due to the transformation of foodstuffs to obtain wine or oil. Remains of wild vegetation have also been found, such as asparagus and fig trees. Some of the uses given to this type of vegetation are believed to be medicinal. At the site we can see a series of plots with yellow gravel indicating where there was wheat or cereal production. As for the fauna, remains of domestic animals have been found, such as cows, pigs and sheep, as well as wild animals, such as deer, wild boar, aurochs (ancestors of the bull), horses and rabbits, which were hunted and eaten. This indicates that the economy of the Cerro de las Cabezas populations was mixed, combining livestock farming with hunting and gathering. In terms of the exploitation of natural resources, evidence has been found of the exploitation of minerals such as copper and iron, suggesting the existence of an economy based on metallurgy. In addition, there is also evidence of the production of pottery in large ovens such as those found at the site and the production of textiles.
