= Oretani =

The Iberian Peninsula in the 3rd century BC.

The Oretani or Oretanii (Greek: Orissioi) were a pre-Roman ancient people of the Iberian Peninsula (the Roman Hispania) that lived in northeastern Andalusia, in the upper Baetis (Guadalquivir) river valley, eastern Marianus Mons (Sierra Morena), and the southern area of present-day La Mancha.

== Origins ==
They could have been an Iberian tribe, a Celtic one, or a mixed Celtic and Iberian tribe or tribal confederacy (and hence related to the Celtiberians). The Mantesani/Mentesani/Mantasani of present-day La Mancha and the Germani (of Oretania) in eastern Marianus Mons (Sierra Morena) and west Jabalón river valley are sometimes included in the Oretani, but it is not certain if they were Oretani tribes.

== Territory ==
Location map of the pre-Roman Oretani people in the Iberian Peninsula.

Oretania, the country of the Oretani, was located in the eastern Sierra Morena, which included most of the province of Ciudad Real except its western end, the northern section of the province of Jaén, and the western half of the province of Albacete. The Roman geographer Pliny the Elder lists 14 cities, including Tuia/Tugia (perhaps Toya), Salaria (perhaps Úbeda and Baeza), Biatia, Castulo/Castulum (presumed capital, later becoming a Visigothic bishopric; medieval name Cazlona, in Jaén), Luparia, Cervaria and Salica, whilst Diodorus Siculus lists 12 towns.

Other sources mention the towns of Libissosa (perhaps Lezuza), Amtorgis, Ilorci, Helicen/Helike (perhaps Elche de la Sierra or Elche), Baecula/Bekor (Bailén, Jaén), Ilucia, Nobila and Cusibi.

== Culture ==
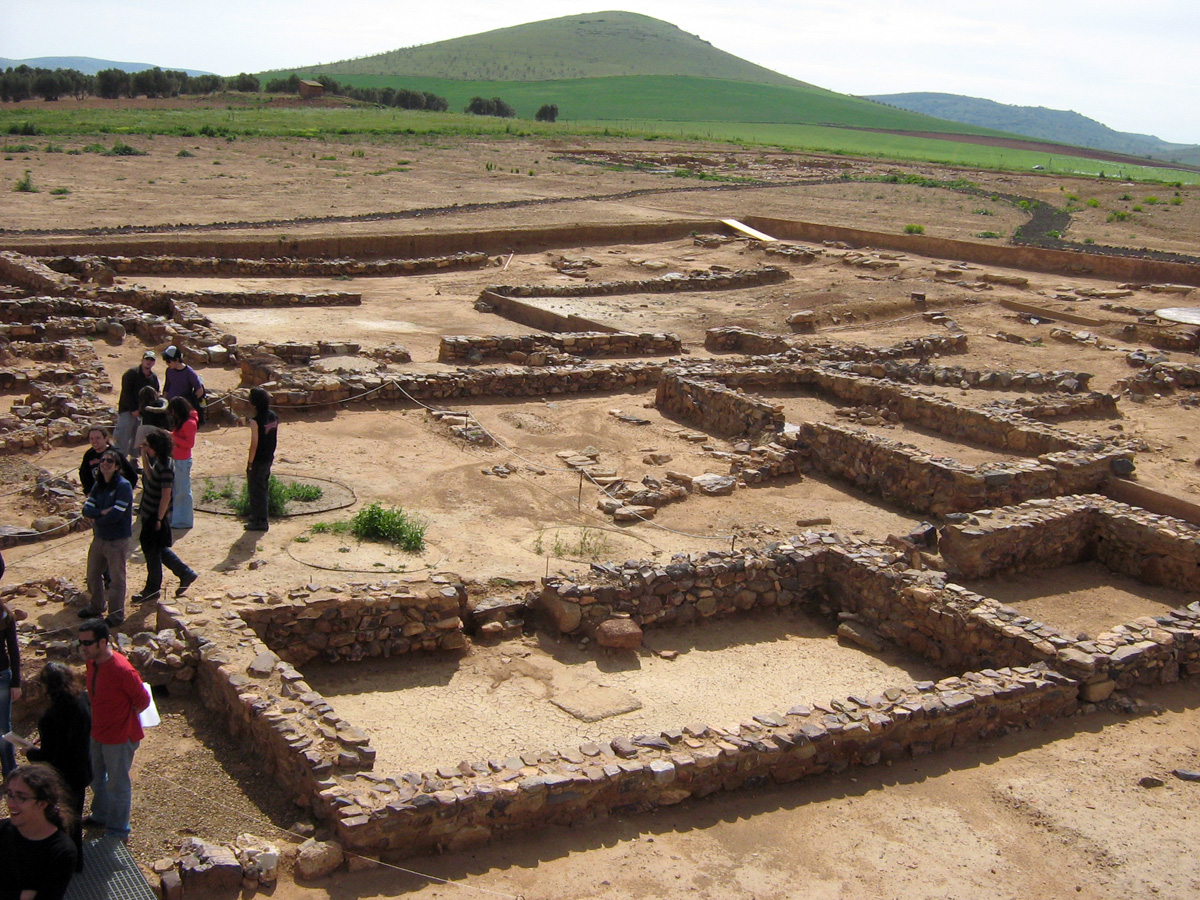
Oreto and Zuqueca archaeological site near Granátula de Calatrava.

They are believed by some to have spoken an Iberian language, by others to have been Celtic language, akin to the Celtiberians, as the northern Oretani were also called Germani and Mantesani. The main archaeological sites in the Oretanian area are Linares, La Carolina, Montiel, Valdepeñas, Almagro, Oreto and Zuqueca, and Cerro de las Cabezas.

== History ==
The Oretani remained independent until the late 3rd Century BC, when their powerful King Orison was defeated at the Battle of Helicen in 228 BC. Orison's defeat in 227 BC and the subsequent alliance with Carthage, however, caused major friction with their Germani allies who continued to resist Punic expansion until being subdued by Hannibal in 221 BC; the latter were certainly amongst the Oretani troops sent to Africa at the outbreak of the Second Punic War.

=== Romanization ===
Like the Germani, the Oretani appear to have adopted a less hostile stance towards Rome and in 156 BC both peoples were included into Hispania Citerior Province, though retaining their Iberian cultural identity for several more centuries.

== See also ==
- Biche of Balazote
