= Chaleco =

Chaleco may refer to:

- Francisco Abad Moreno "Chaleco" (fl. 1808–1815), Spanish guerrilla
- Francisco López Contardo (born 1975), also known as "Chaleco", Chilean motorcyclist
- Chaleco, a type of clothing worn by the Quechua people
