= Ana de Castro Egas =

Spanish writer

- Born: End of 16th century Valdepeñas, Ciudad Real
- Occupations: Biographer, poet
- Writing career
- Language: Spanish
- Notable works: Eternidad del Rey don Filipe Tercero nuestro señor, el piadoso

Ana de Castro Egas was a Spanish poet and biographer of the Spanish Golden Age. The only text known by Castro Egas is the Eternidad del rey nuestro señor don Felipe III (Eternity to the King our Lord Don Felipe III), published in 1629.

== Life ==
Ana de Castro Egas was born in the end of 16th century in Valdepeñas, in the province of Ciudad Real, and resided in Madrid. As a child, she met Cardinal-Infante Ferdinand of Austria and later became part of the inner circle of the Royal House and a close friend of the Dukes of Lerma and Uceda. Ferdinand suggested Castro Egas become a biographer of his father, King Philip III of Spain.

Castro Egas started to work on the biography of Philip III along with Francisco de Quevedo, who wrote the preface for her book. In 1629, Eternidad del Rey don Filipe Tercero nuestro señor, el piadoso was published. The book is a panegyric in prose written to celebrate Philip III. It is the only surviving work of Castro Egas.

It is known about Castro Egas from the numerous poems and prose stories that major poets and writers of her time wrote about her and dedicated to her, including Lope de Vega, Quevedo, Valdivieso, Mira de Amescua, Bocangel, López Zárate, Pérez de Montalbán, and Pellicer.

Castro Egas closely collaborated with her niece Catalina del Río, and her cousins Clara María and Ana María de Castro. She was known as a promoter of including women in literary and academic circles.

The date of Ana de Castro Egas' death remains unknown.
