= Valdepeñas =

- Municipality
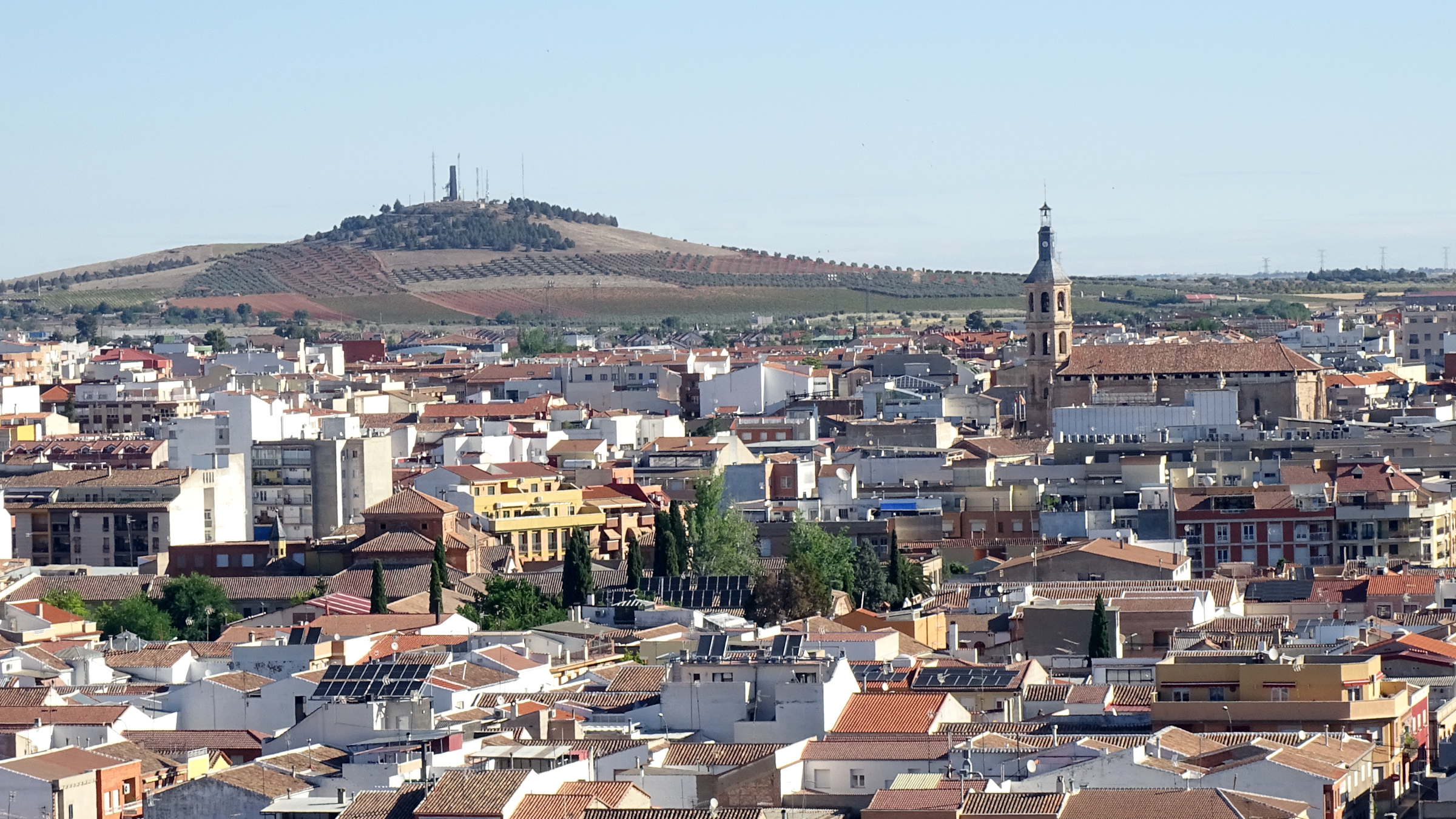
- View of Valdepeñas

- Coat of arms
- Interactive map of Valdepeñas
- Location within Castilla-La Mancha Location within Spain
- Coordinates: 38°45′42″N 3°23′06″W
- Country: Spain
- Autonomous community: Castile-La Mancha
- Province: Ciudad Real
- Founded: 13th century

Government
  - Type: Ayuntamiento
  - Body: Ayuntamiento de Valdepeñas
  - Mayor: Jesús Martín Rodríguez (2007) (PSOE)

Area
  - Total: 487.65 km^{2} (188.28 sq mi)
- Elevation: 705 m (2,313 ft)

Population (2025-01-01)
  - Total: 30,782
  - Density: 63.123/km^{2} (163.49/sq mi)
- Demonym: Valdepeñero/a
- Time zone: UTC+1 (CET)
  - Summer (DST): UTC+2 (CEST)
- Postal code: 13300
- Website: Official website

Valdepeñas is a municipality in the province of Ciudad Real, in the autonomous community of Castile-La Mancha, Spain. It is also the seat of the judicial district that covers the localities of Moral de Calatrava, Santa Cruz de Mudela, Viso del Marqués, Torrenueva, Castellar de Santiago and Almuradiel.

Developed in the 13th century under the auspices of the Order of Calatrava, its emergence is connected to the depopulation of the nearby settlements of Santa María, Aberturas, and Corral Rubio. It possesses a traditional wine industry. It lies on the road (A-4) and rail (Alcázar de San Juan–Cádiz railway) route traditionally connecting the Meseta Central with Andalusia through the Despeñaperros Pass.

== Geography ==
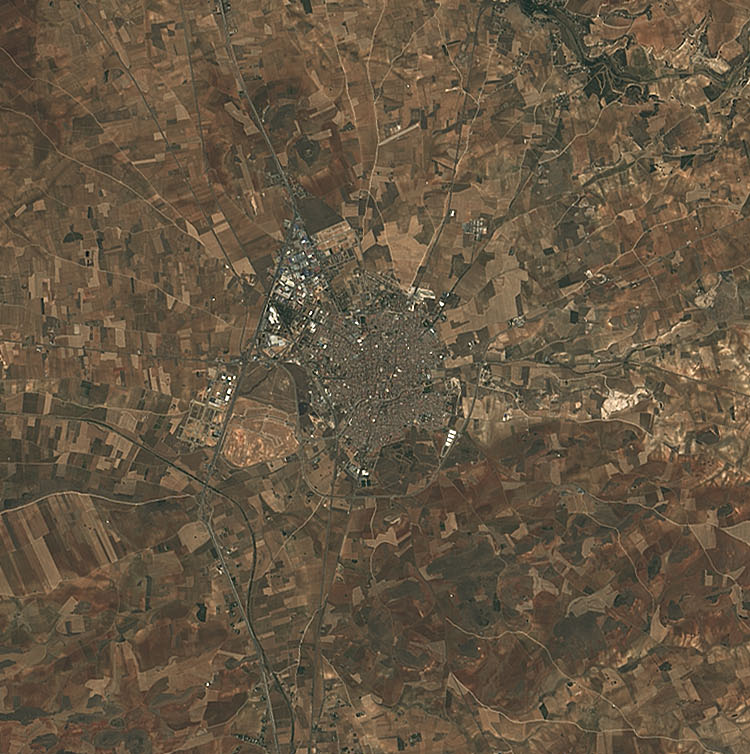
Satellite view of Valdepeñas

Its name means "Valley of Rocks", because it is located in a wide hilly area surrounded by a meander of the Jabalón River, just bordering on the plain south of La Mancha, and the subsoil is rich in limestone rock. It is located in the Campo de Calatrava, an extensive plain north of the Sierra Morena, and lies on the left bank of Jabalón River, a tributary of the Guadiana.

The hamlet (pedanía) of Consolación is a dependency of Valdepeñas and is located at the intersection between Autovía A-4 (Autovia del Sur) and road CR-5214. It was built by the Instituto Nacional de Colonización in 1949.

== History ==
=== Prehistory ===
The municipal area houses numerous prehistoric remains, platforms and watchtowers located in the hills, compatible with settlers of the Bronze Age called Culture of the Motillas, dated between the 10th and 13th centuries BC. Vasco Merlo in his History of Valdepeñas described these structures erroneously as Celtiberian settlements, despite their being much older than that and possibly belonging to the Culture of Argar.

=== Ancient history ===
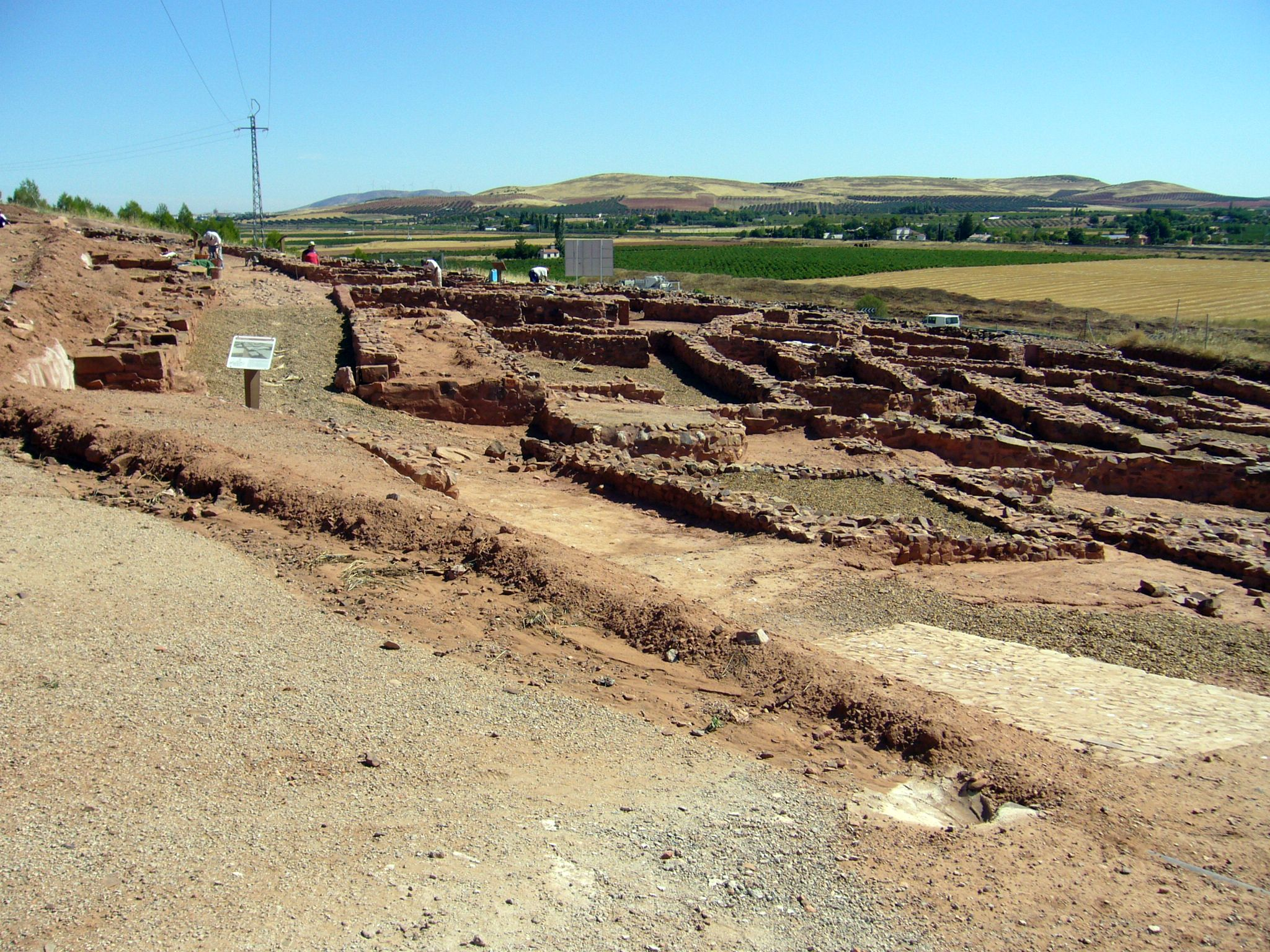
Archaeological iberian ensemble of Cerro Cabezas in Valdepeñas.

Eight kilometres to the south of the city is located the Iberian city of "Cerro de las Cabezas" (Hill of the Heads), a great oppidum or town fortified with a true castle in the summit of the hill that it occupies, inhabited between the 7th and 2nd centuries BC. It is an important archaeological deposit of the Oretana Culture and shows signs of the first vestige of the grapevine in this region.

In the 16th century and later artefacts such as graves, coins and other ancient Roman items, from a Roman villa of the 1st century BC, that still existed in the Visigothic period.

=== Middle Ages ===
During the Middle Ages, the area was part of the Moorish taifa of Toledo. The Arab inscriptions and a sundial on the walls of the Church of the Assumption date from this period. According to oral tradition, the Caliphate gave permission to the inhabitants to cultivate vineyards and make wine, which is prohibited by the Quran. The Moors were expelled from Valdepenas at the end of the 15th century.

By order of Queen Berenguela of Castile and after the battle of Las Navas de Tolosa in 1212, settlers of several villages (Aberturas, Corral Rubio de Jabalón, Santa María de las Flores and Castilnuevo) moved to the area around the present Church of the Assumption, which had been an old castle. From that moment Valdepeñas belonged to the military Order of Calatrava and the first text it is mentioned in is the record of The Order of Calatrava in 1243. The new settlers came from the Kingdoms of Castile, León (Galicia mainly) and Aragón. The Order demanded conditions of establishment and right of citizenship, the continued care of the grapevine.

In medieval times the Jewish community became important and this is reflected in the existence of at least two synagogues, one of which was eventually converted into the hermitage of Veracruz and the old building where the Parish of The Christ was located, behind its present location.

=== Early modern age ===
The Catholic Monarchs, Ferdinand and Isabella of Castille, lodged in Valdepeñas on 18 February 1488 at the mother of Alfonso de Merlo's house, and left to the care of the widow the infants during part of the conquest of Granada. The same Alfonso de Merlo was named Captain and went with more than two hundred men to the Conquest of Granada, funding the campaign with his own money. The Catholic Monarchs recognized and granted him the title of Knight. Some of his descendants moved to the New World and took important positions in Peru and Chile.

Diverse religious and civil buildings from the 16th century such as the Trinitarians Convent can be found in the town.

King Ferdinand the Catholic wanted to control the power of Military Orders, and Pope Adrian VI granted orders to the Kingdom of Castile, passing to Royal Jurisdiction an important patrimony: two cities, two hundred villas (Valdepeñas among them) and a hundred of villages, distributed in an ample territory.

King Philip II sold the town on 22 April 1575 to Alvaro de Bazán, first Marquis of Santa Cruz. Valdepeñas would happen to be a lordship, secreting itself of the Order of Calatrava.

The successive marquesses promoted the wines of Valdepeñas in the Spanish Court of the Austrian and its fame consequently extended all over the country. Valdepeñas' "clarete" became known as "aloque" at this time.

=== Contemporary history ===
Valdepeñas led a quiet existence until 6 June 1808, when Napoleon's occupation of Spain became an issue after the events of 2 May in Madrid of that year. Napoleon's troops went to Andalusia as reinforcements and attempted to cross the villa; the entire population (men, women and also some of the neighbouring villas) took up arms to prevent the passage of the troops. The result was a high number of lives lost and a major fire. Highlighted in the fight was a woman, Juana Galán "La Galana". The outcome was that the troops had to retreat from the province of La Mancha, a delay which led, at least in part, to the Spanish victory at the Battle of Bailen. King Fernando VII would give the villa the Title of "Very Heroic". After these events, some inhabitants from Valdepeñas took part of the guerrilla fighting against the Napoleonic troops in the "Guerra de la Independencia", Francisco Abad, "Chaleco", became a famous guerrillero.

At the beginning of the 20th century, the appearance of Phylloxera led to the introduction of the resistant American vine but did not change the economy much. The Spanish Civil War broke this development, and the city's population decreased. From the 1940s to the 1970s the only economical activities were agriculture and the traditional family industry of wine, a common phenomenon in central Spain in those times. In the 1980s, Valdepeñas saw a modernization of the wine sector, including new kinds of grapes, and the introduction of techniques in wine production.

== Culture ==
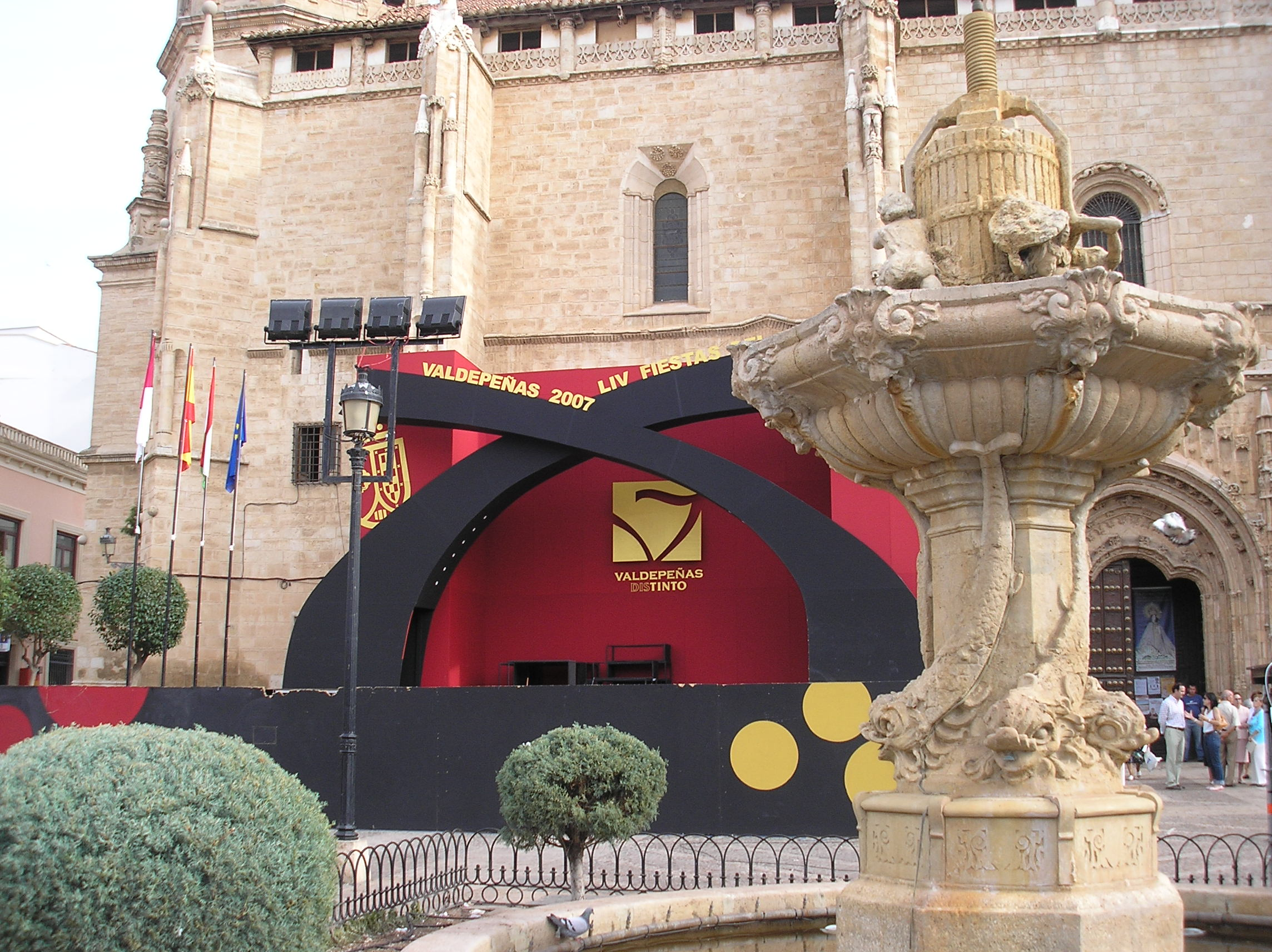
Valdepeñas festival, 2007.

Valdepeñas has several museums of history, art and wine. There are two Fairs, in August "the summer fair" at the first week and in September known as "Fiesta de la Vendimia" (Grape Harvest Fair).

== People ==
- Bernardo de Balbuena, appointed Bishop of Puerto Rico in 1620, who wrote Baroque poetry extolling the beauties of Mexico.
- Luis Merlo de la Fuente Ruiz de Beteta, colonial official who briefly served as the Royal Governor of Chile, in 1610–11.
- Gregorio Prieto, painter, poet and illustrator well known for his portraits, kitsch collages and also rural landscapes of England, Greece and La Mancha. He worked for the BBC in London while in exile after the Spanish Civil War. A foundation named after him exhibits most of his work in Valdepeñas.
- Francisco Abad Moreno "Chaleco" was one of many Spanish guerrilleros who came to prominence in the Spanish War of Independence.
- Juan Luis Rodríguez-Vigil is a Spanish Socialist Workers' Party (PSOE) politician. He was President of the Principality of Asturias between 1991 and 1993.
- Ana de Castro Egas was a Spanish poet and biographer of the Spanish Golden Age. The only text known by Castro Egas is the Eternidad del rey nuestro señor don Felipe III (Eternity to the King our Lord Don Felipe III), published in 1629.[1]
- Alonso de Córdoba He was made an encomendero (trustee) over the indigenous population in Santiago, Chile and served as regidor of the city in 1548, 1568 and 1580. He was mayor (alcalde) of Santiago in 1559, 1562, and 1581. He purchased the rights and founded the Spanish settlement at El Quisco. He died in 1589 in Santiago.
- Juana Galán nicknamed La Galana, was a guerrilla fighter of the Peninsular War (1808–1814) who took to the street to fight against the French cavalry that tried to pass through the town of Valdepeñas.
- Francisco Nieva He was a member of the avant-garde literary movement called Postismo. Between 1948 and 1963, he lived in Paris where his acquaintances included modernists such as Ionesco and Beckett. His first published work Es bueno no tener cabeza appeared in 1971. A past winner of the Asturias Award, he was considered to be a leading candidate for the Cervantes Prize.

Nieva was elected to Seat J of the Real Academia Española on 17 April 1986, he took up his seat on 29 April 1990.[3]

- Carmen García de Merlo is a Spanish lawyer, nurse and civil servant of Madrid City Council. In 2018, she became President of COGAM Lesbian, Gay, Transsexual and Bisexual Collective of Madrid, being the first transgender woman to preside over the organization.

== Economy ==
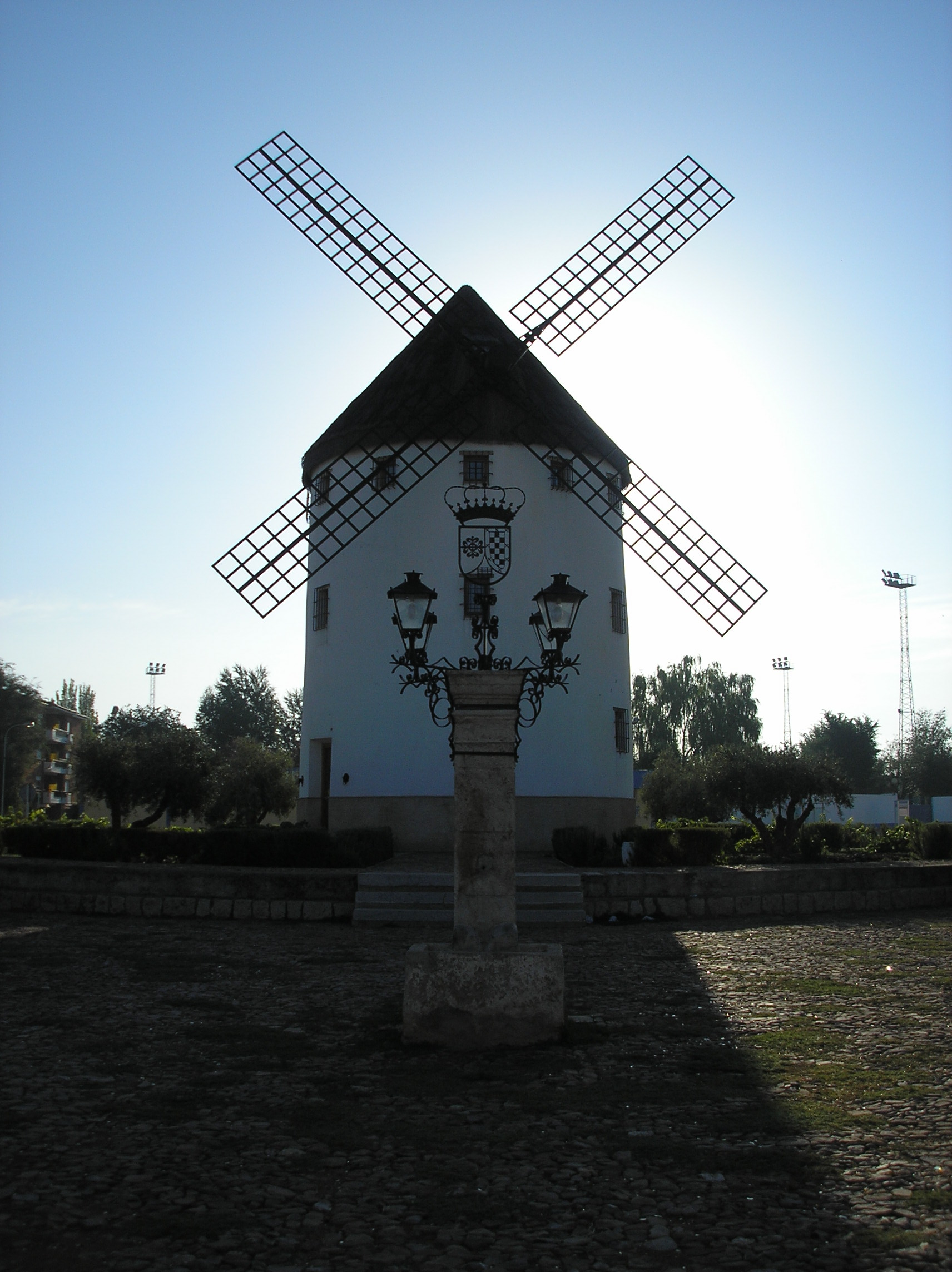
Windmill of Gregorio Prieto

After rapid growth in the late 19th century, the town became home to large distilleries, tanneries, flour mills, cooperages, and other factories, as well as hot mineral springs, but its chief trade was in red wines. The city continues to be famous for its wines and is the centre of a grape-growing district. Valdepeñas wines are among the most popular in Spain and recently in EU countries. In addition to the food and wine industry, there are small and medium industries located in several industrial parks.

Industries include:

- Plant of production and investigation of Systems in High Electronic Technology.
- The logistic center of Heavy Transport, for heavy trucks
- D. Quixote Route and the through train of wine with point of departure from Madrid.

== Twin towns ==
- Cognac, France

== See also ==
- Napoleonic Wars
- Oretani
- Angel of Victory (Valdepeñas)
