= Martyrs of Daimiel =

Passionist Martyrs of Daimiel
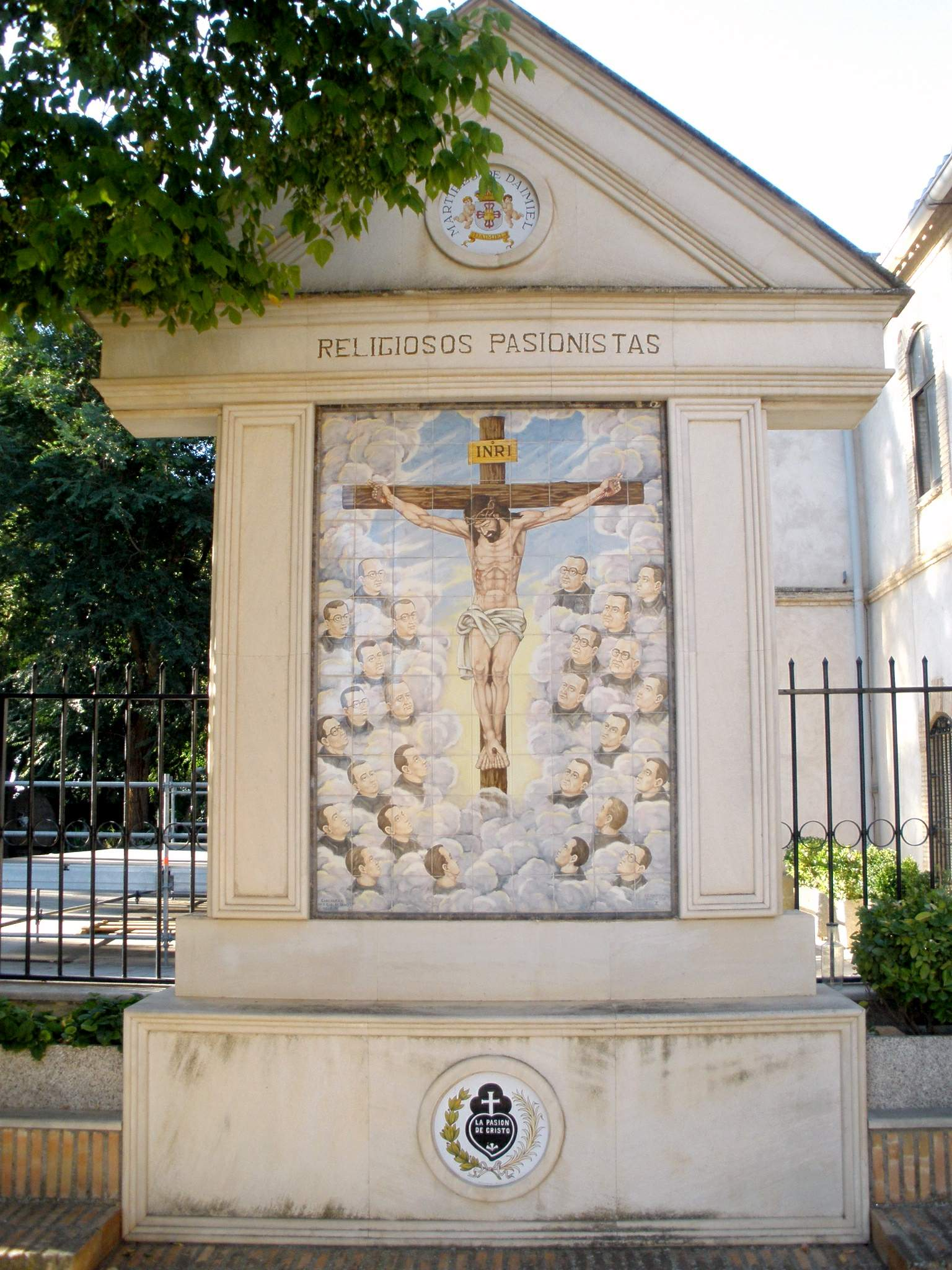
- Memorial in Daimiel
- Died: July 24, 1936, Spain
- Martyred by: Republican regime
- Means of martyrdom: gunshot
- Venerated in: Roman Catholic Church
- Beatified: October 1, 1989, by Pope John Paul II
- Major shrine: Daimiel, Spain
- Feast: July 24
- Attributes: Passionist Habit and Sign

The Passionist Martyrs of Daimiel were a group of priests and brothers of the Passionist Congregation killed by anti-clericalist Republican forces during the Spanish Civil War.

== Martyrdom ==
At 11:30 pm on the night of 24 July 1936, a group of armed men arrived at the Passionist monastery of Santo Cristo de la Luz in Daimiel, Spain. The members of the community were gathered for prayer when the superior of the community, Father Niceforo of Jesus, upon hearing the armed men exclaimed

Gethsemane – this is our Gethsemane. Our spirit is deeply distressed as it contemplates the daunting perspective of Calvary, as was that of Jesus, and so too our human nature, in its weakness, trembles, becomes cowardly… But Jesus is with us. I am going to give you He who is the strength of the weak.. Jesus was comforted by an angel; it is Jesus himself who comforts and sustains us… Within a few moments we will be with Christ… Citizens of Calvary, take heart! Let us die with Christ! It is my duty to encourage you and I myself am encouraged by your example.

Father Nicefore then gave the community absolution and Holy Communion.

The Passionists were ordered out of the church and led to the local cemetery under armed guard. One of the five survivors later remarked:

Our imagination ran wild as we saw the already dug graves. Would they bury us alive…or dead? The thought of death frightened us, but the idea of being buried alive was even more terrifying.

The armed men split the Passionists into groups and headed in different directions. The religious were set free but their movements had been observed by the Popular Front and information regarding their locations was sent to various armed fighters in the area using phrases such as

The Passionists of Daimiel are going to pass through here. Fresh meat! Don't let them get away…

On 23 July 1936, Father Niceforo and four others were shot dead, seven more survived but after suffering from their injuries were executed three months later by firing squad. Nine others were placed on a train to Ciudad Real. They were put in gaol, accused of being religious who were killing people. Then they were led down the street to be mocked and stoned by crowds. These Passionists were shot dead and buried in a mass grave, their alleged crime written on their wrists 'For being Passionist religious from Daimiel'. Ten other Passionists tried to get to Madrid by train or walking. They were taken off the train at Urda station and there, on the morning of July 25, shot dead. Two others, Father Juan Pedro of Saint Anthony and the elderly Brother Pablo Maria of Saint Joseph managed to walk to Carrion de Calatrava in Ciudad Real where they hid for two months. They were discovered and shot as they kissed their crucifixes and exclaimed "Long Live Christ the King!"

Eyewitnesses reported that all of the Passionists had forgiven their murderers before they died. A witness to the murder of Father Niceforo reported that after being shot the priest turned his eyes to heaven then turned and smiled at his murderers. At this point one of them, now more infuriated than ever, shouted:

What, are you still smiling?

With that he shot him at point blank range.

== The Martyrs ==
Those who died were:

- Father Nicéforo of Jesus and Mary (Vincente Díez Tejerina) provincial superior, who had previously suffered persecution and exile in Mexico, born 17 February 1893 in Herreruela, Cáceres, Spain.
- Father Germán of Jesus and Mary (Manuel Pérez Jiménez), superior of the community, born 7 September 1898 in Cornago, La Rioja, Spain.
- Father Juan Pedro of Saint Anthony (José María Bengoa Aranguren), who had also suffered persecution in Mexico; born 19 June 1890 in Santa Agata de Guesatíbar, Guipúzcoa, Spain, died 25 September 1936 in Carrion de Calatrava, Ciudad Real, Spain.
- Father Felipe of the Child Jesus (Felipe Valcobado Granado), born 26 May 1874 in at San Martín de Rubiales, Burgos, Spain.
- Father Ildefonso of the Cross (Anatolio García Nozal), born 15 March 1898 in Becerril del Carpio, Palencia, Spain.
- Father Pedro of the Heart of Jesus (Pedro Largo Redondo), born 19 May 1907 in Alba de los Cardaños, Palencia, Spain.
- Father Justiniano of Saint Gabriel of Our Lady of Sorrows (Justiniano Cuesta Redondo), born 19 August 1910 in Alba de los Cardaños, Palencia, Spain.
- Brother Pablo Maria of Saint Joseph (Pedro Leoz Portillo), born 17 February 1882 in Leoz, Navarra, Spain.
- Brother Benito of the Virgin of Villar (Benito Solana Ruiz), born 17 February 1882 in Cintruénigo, Navarra, Spain.
- Brother Anacario of the Immaculata (Anacario Benito Lozal), born 23 September 1906 in Becerril del Carpio, Palencia, Spain.
- Brother Felipe of Saint Michael (Felipe Ruiz Fraile), born 6 March 1915 in Quintanilla de la Berzosa, Palencia, Spain.
- Confrater Eufrasio of Merciful Love (Eufrasio de Celis Santos), born 13 March 1913 in Salinas de Pisuerga, Palencia, Spain.
- Confrater Maurilio of the Child Jesus (Murilio Macho Rodríguez), born 15 March 1915 in Villafría, Burgos, Spain.
- Confrater Tomás of the Blessed Sacrament (Tomás Cuartero Gascón), born 22 February 1915 in Tabuenca, Zaragoza, Spain.
- Confrater José María of Jesus and Mary (José María Cuartero Gascón), born 24 April 1918 in Tabuenca, Zaragoza, Spain, died 23 October 1936 in Manzanares, Ciudad Real, Spain.
- Confrater José of the Sacred Hearts, (José Estalayo García), born 17 March 1915 in San Martín de Perapertú, Palencia, Spain.
- Confrater José of Jesus and Mary (José Osés Sáinz), born 29 April 1915 in Peralta, Navarra, Spain.
- Confrater Julio of the Heart of Jesus, (Julio Mediavilla Concejero), born 7 May 1915 in La Lastra, Palencia, Spain.
- Confrater Félix of the Five Wounds (Félix Ugalde Ururzun), born 6 November 1915 in Mendigorria, Navarra, Spain, died: 25 September 1936 in Urdá, Toledo, Spain.
- Confrater José of Jesus Agonising (José María Ruiz Martínez), born 3 February 1916 in Puente La Reina, Navarra, Spain.
- Confrater Fulgencio of the Heart of Mary (Fulgencio Calvo Sánchez), born 12 May 1916 in Cubillo de Ojeda, Palencia, Spain.
- Confrater Honorino of Our Lady of Sorrows (Honorio Carracedo Ramos), born 21 April 1916 in La Lastra, Palencia, Spain.
- Confrater Laurino of Jesus Crucified (Laurino Proaño Cuesta), born 14 April 1916 in Villafría, Burgos, Spain, died: 22 July 1936 in Carabanchel Bajo, Madrid, Spain.
- Confrater Epifanio of Saint Michael (Epifanio Sierra Conde), born 12 May 1916 in San Martín de los Herreros, Palencia, Spain.
- Confrater Abilio of the Cross (Abilio Ramos y Ramos), born 22 February 1917 in Resoba, Palencia, Spain.
- Confrater Zacarías of the Blessed Sacrament (Zacarías Fernández Crespo), born: 24 May 1917 in Cintruénigo, Navarra, Spain, died: 23 July 1936 in Manzanares, Ciudad Real, Spain.

The majority of the martyrs were young students, sixteen of them between the ages of 18 and 21.

== Beatification ==
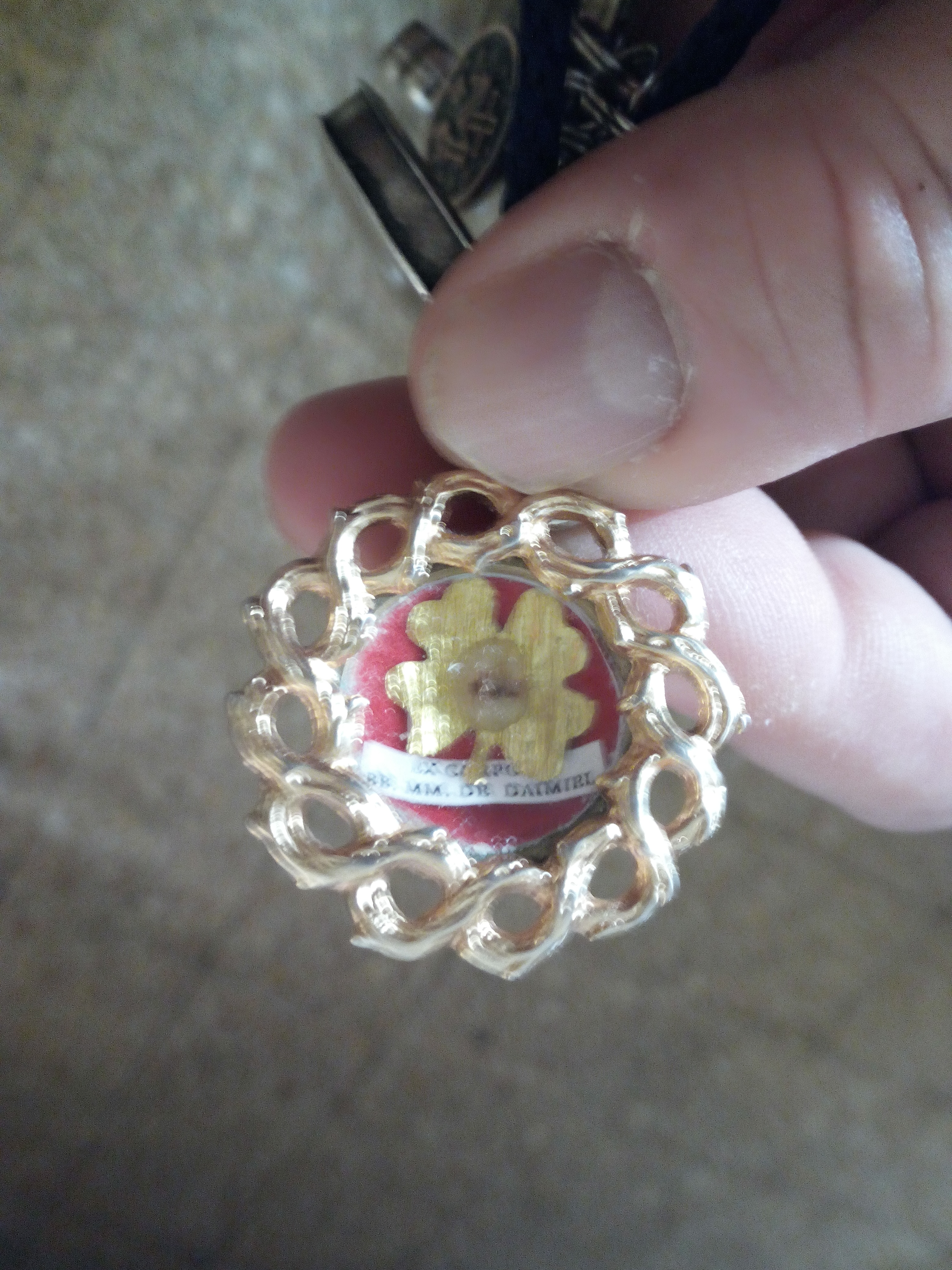
Relic of the Martyrs of Daimiel

The cause for the canonization of the Passionist martyrs of Daimiel was opened in 1984. They were declared 'Venerable' on 28 November 1988 and were beatified by Pope John Paul II on 1 October 1989. Their relics are preserved and venerated in the crypt of the monastery of Daimiel. The liturgical feast is celebrated on 24 July.

== See also ==
- Innocencio of Mary Immaculate
- Martyrs of the Spanish Civil War
- 498 Spanish Martyrs
- Red Terror (Spain)
