= Motilla del Azuer =

Bronze Age archaeological site in Spain

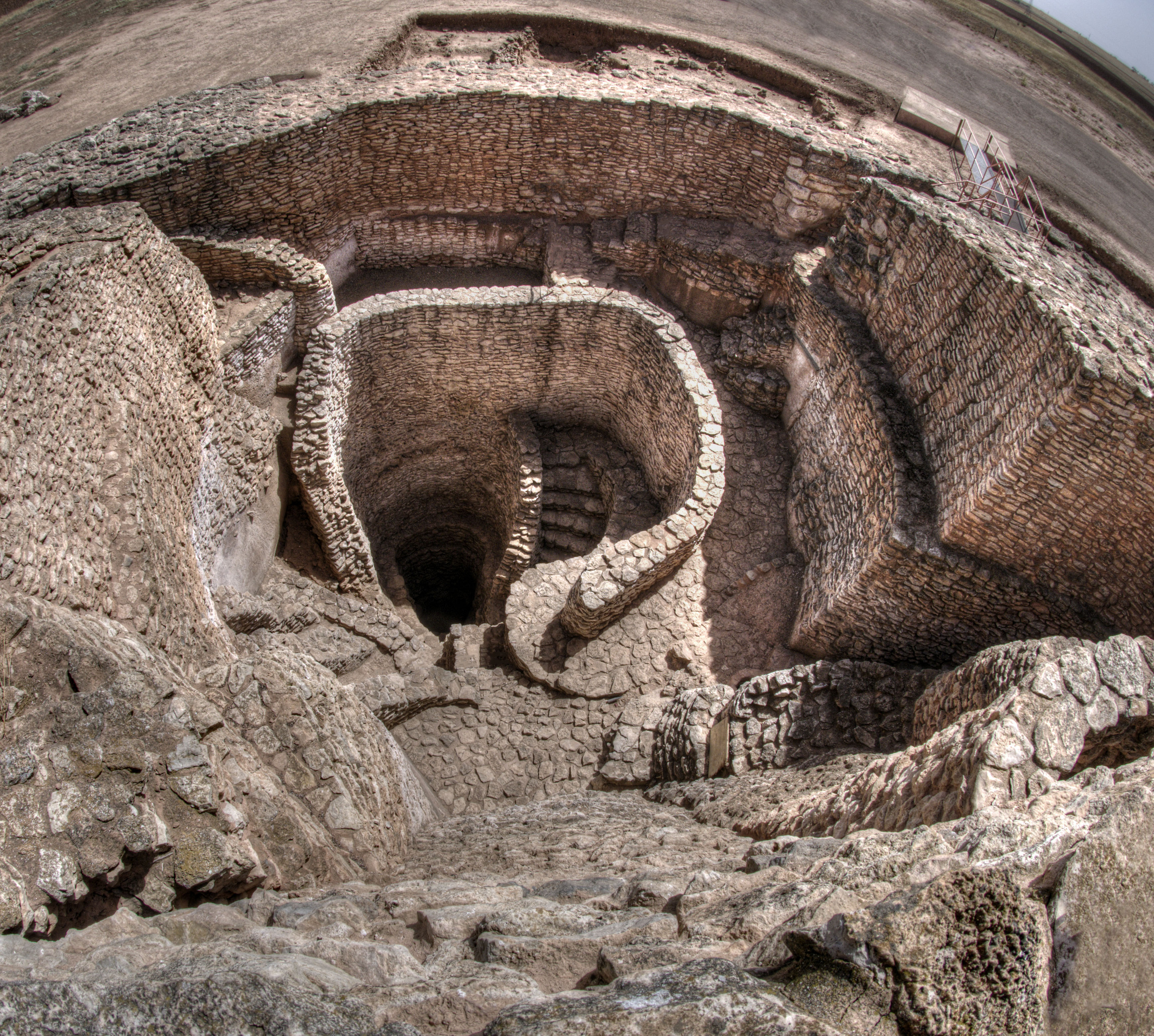
- Overhead view in August 2016

- Location within Castilla-La Mancha
- 39°02′36″N 3°29′51″W
- Location: Daimiel, in the Province of Ciudad Real, Spain
- Region: Castilla–La Mancha

History
- Built: Bronze Age

Site notes
- Public access: Open to the public

Spanish Cultural Heritage
- Official name: Motilla del Azuer
- Type: Non-movable
- Criteria: Zona Arqueológica
- Designated: 20 June 2013; 13 years ago

The Motilla del Azuer is a prehistoric fortification dating from the Bronze Age in the municipality of Daimiel, in the Province of Ciudad Real, Castilla–La Mancha, Spain.

Extensive field work has been carried out since 1974 and was ongoing in 2021. On 20 June 2013 the site was declared a "Bien de Interés Cultural" (asset of cultural interest) to archaeology.

== Context ==
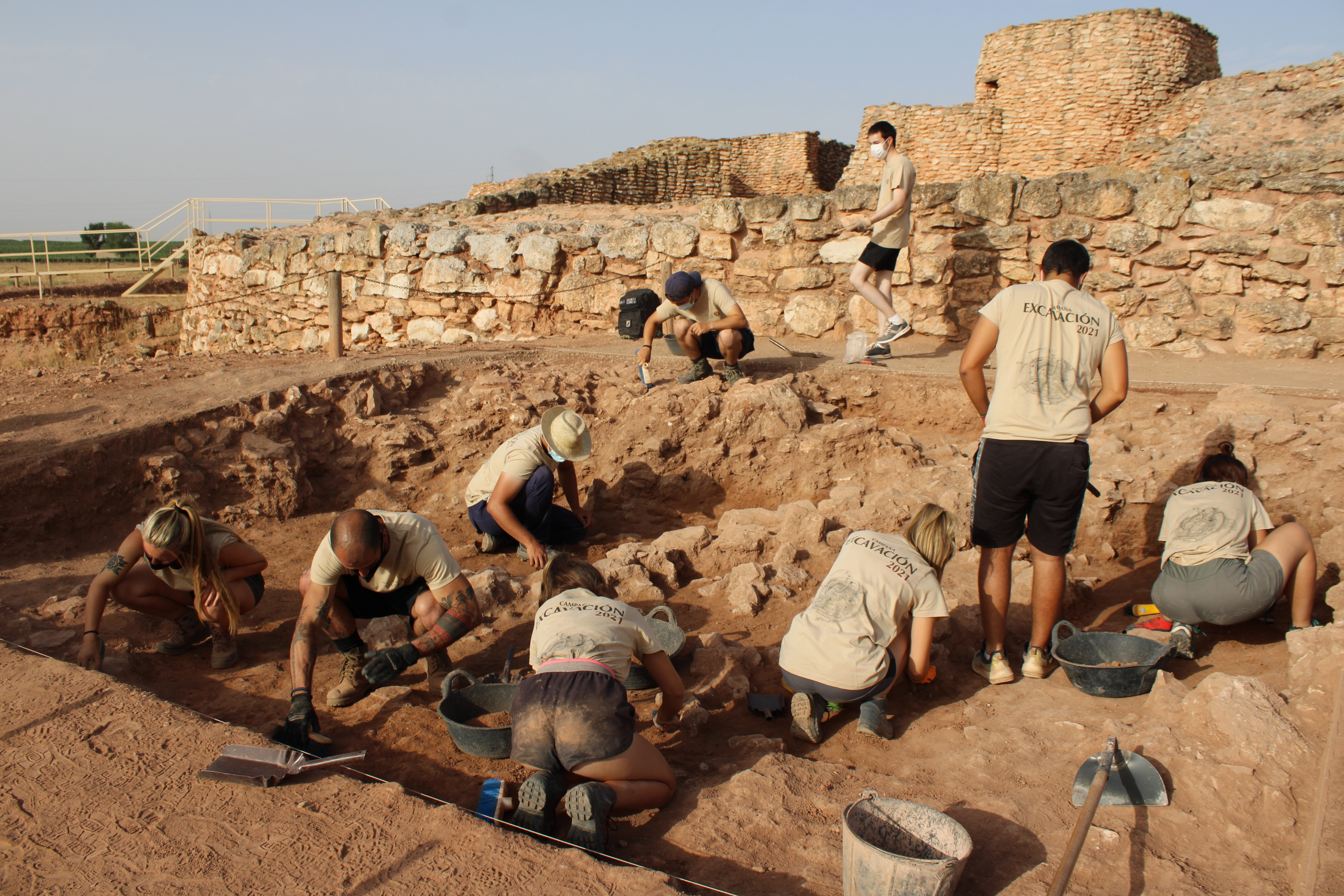
Archeological dig in August 2021

The artificial mounds known as motillas are the remains of one of the most unusual types of prehistoric settlement on the Iberian Peninsula. They are found in the La Mancha region and date from the Bronze Age, between about 2200 and 1500 BCE. The mounds are between four and ten metres (13 and 33 ft) high and were originally fortifications with a central plan and several concentric lines of walls. They are found around the La Mancha plain, generally some four to five kilometres (2.5 to 3.1 mi) apart, in an area of river plains and lowland where, until recent times, there were many lagoons and marshes. The special characteristic of this site and the massiveness of its fortifications, with masonry walls more than eight metres (26 ft) high, make the Azuer settlement one of the most notable Bronze Age survivals of the Iberian Peninsula.

During the Bronze Age, these fortified settlements played an important role in the management and control of local economies. Inside the walls was a water supply from a well, large-scale storage and processing of cereals, the housing of livestock, and the production of ceramics. Other handicrafts were also carried out.

== Description ==
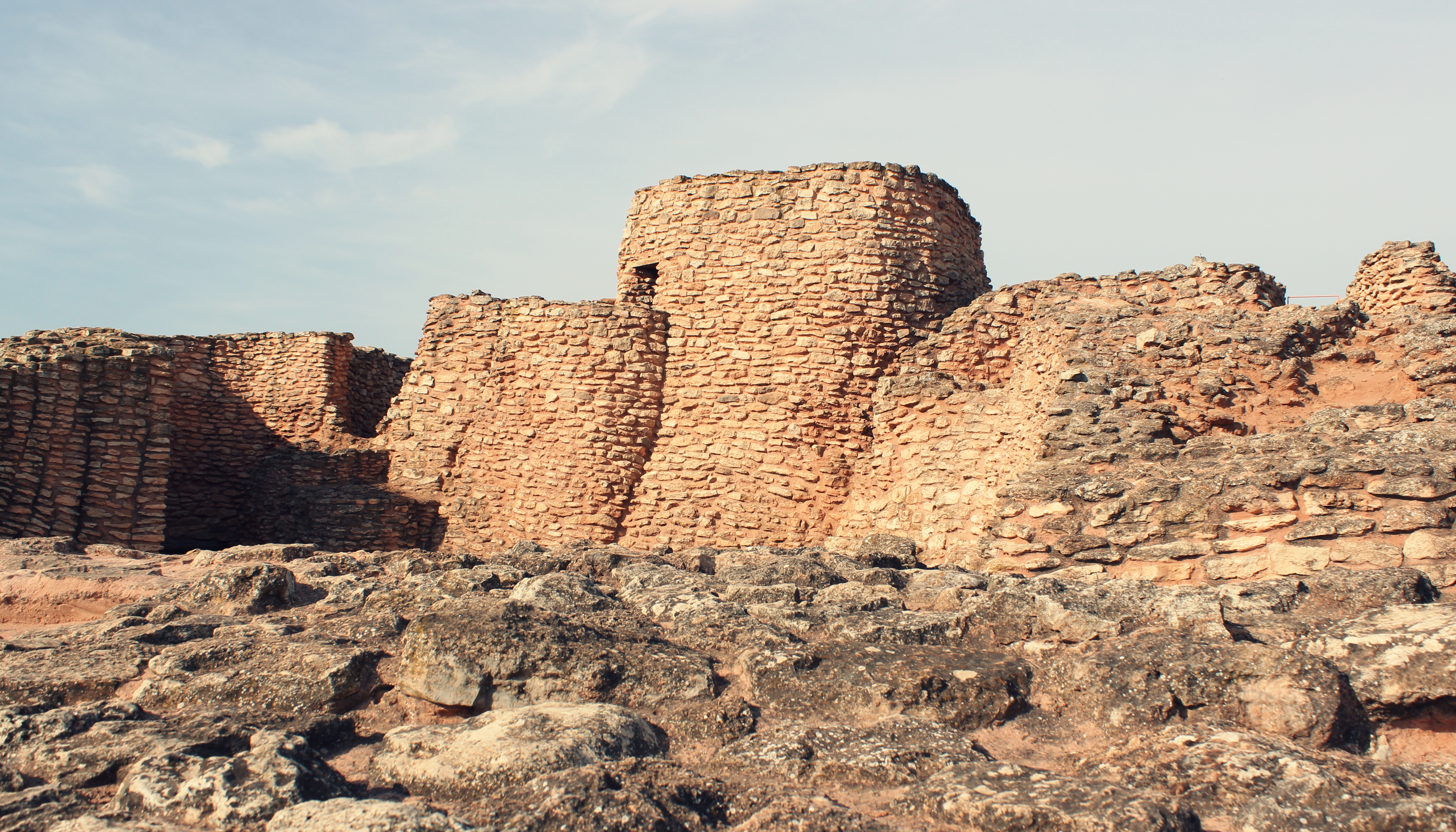
View of the complex in 2017

The mound at Azuer has a diameter of about forty metres (130 ft). On it stand a tower, three concentric lines of walls, and a large courtyard. The central core is a masonry tower with a square floor plan, the east and west walls of which still stand more than ten metres (33 ft) high. Entrance to the interior is by ramps within narrow masonry corridors.

Within the walls are large spaces, a patio and two large enclosures separated by an intermediate wall. Inside the patio, which has a trapezoidal plan, is a well which goes down through the alluvial terrace to the water table. This was in use throughout the occupation of the site and currently reaches to a depth of at least sixteen metres (52 ft).

The intermediate enclosure occupies the western half of the fortification, between the intermediate wall and the outer face of a corridor surrounding the tower. The function of this enclosure changed during the different phases of occupation of the site, being sometimes used as a stabling area for sheep, goats, and pigs, and sometimes as a warehouse for barley and wheat. It has rectangular silos built of masonry and mud, a system replaced by storage in large vases and esparto baskets in the later phases of occupation.

The outermost line of walls are of great interest, as there has been a collapse inwards, raising questions about the dynamics and constructive systems of the site. Inside the enclosure between the outer and intermediate walls, there are many circular or oval ovens, with masonry plinths and vaulted clay covers, as well as rectangular silos for grain, which were built throughout the occupation of the site.

The outermost circular wall has in its last phase of construction a cyclopean face of limestone blocks. Access to the interior of the fortification from the settlement area was through corridors parallel to the walls. The living area was located outside the walls, within a radius of about fifty metres (160 ft). The houses have an oval or rectangular floor plan, with masonry plinths, clay elevations, and embedded posts. Associated with the houses are large open areas of storage and work spaces, with a high concentration of pits and remains of fireplaces or ovens, and areas of middens.

== Cemetery ==
There is also a cemetery at the site, covering most of the area of the settlement, following a common pattern in most peninsular cultures of the Bronze Age. The dead were buried in a crouching position, inside simple graves or graves lined with masonry walls or slabs, sometimes attached to the walls of the houses or to the outer defensive walls. Some children were buried in pots. Few grave goods have been found, apart from the exceptional cases of adults buried with ceramic vessels. Such finds include a dagger with arsenical bronze rivets and a punch of the same metal.

== Investigations and restoration work ==
Since 1974, a team from the University of Granada, directed by Trinidad Nájera Colino and Fernando Molina González, had by 2021 undertaken fourteen seasons of archaeological fieldwork, with the first research phase lasting until 1986. There was a pause of several years, and fieldwork started again in 2000 and was still in progress in 2021.

The work has led to consolidation and restoration projects.

An interdisciplinary hydrogeological study in 2014 found a relationship between the geological substrate and the distribution of the motillas at Daimiel, considering also that they may be the most ancient system of groundwater collection in Iberia. The study concluded that the motillas were built in the Bronze Age during the 4.2-kiloyear BP aridification event, due to a period of prolonged and severe drought, and that the building of defended settlements around wells was "a successful solution that continued for about one millennium and formed the main part of the processes of change towards a more complex and hierarchical society".
