= Daimiel =

- Municipality
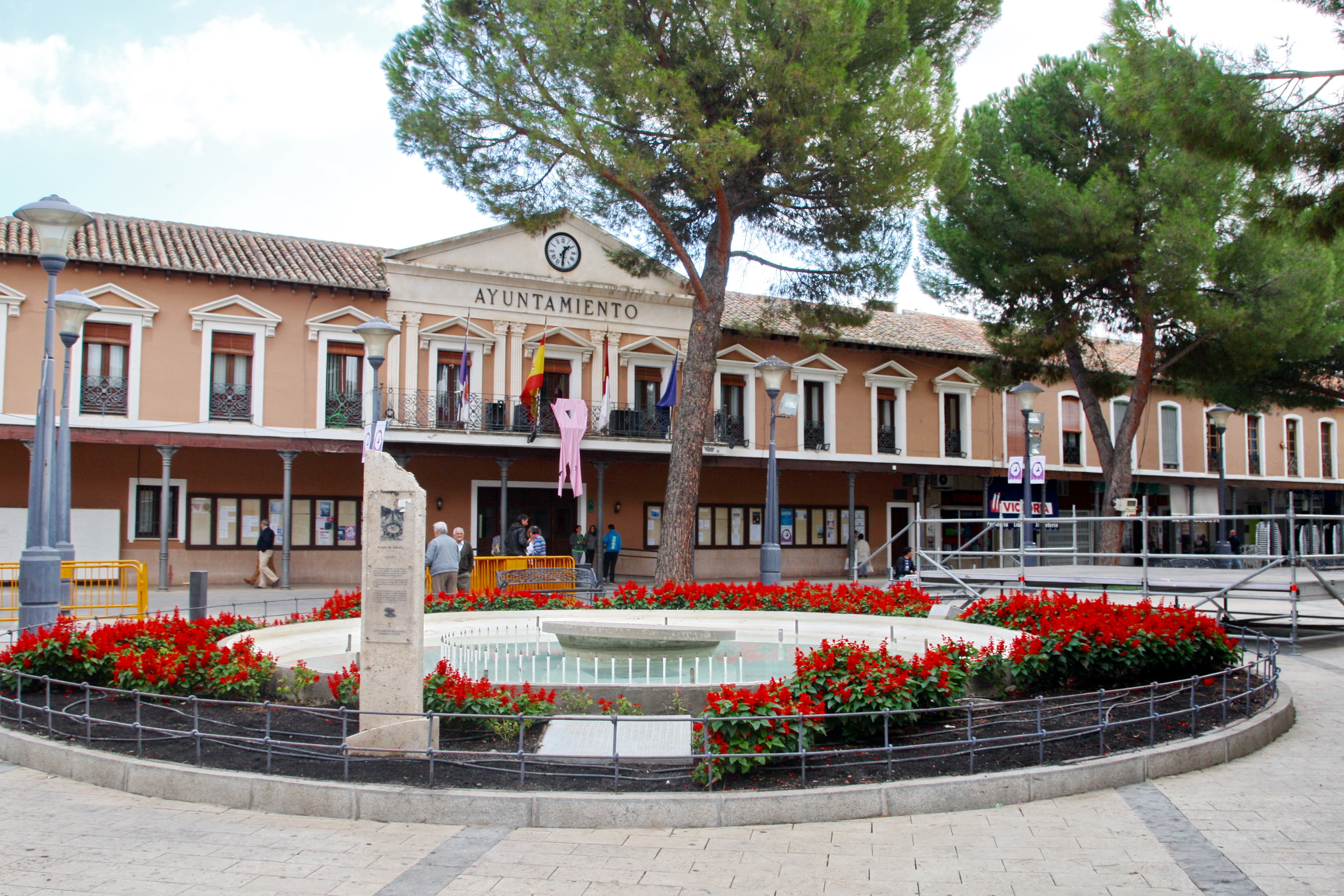
- Town hall

- Flag Coat of arms

- Location in Spain
- Coordinates: 39°4′20″N 3°36′52″W
- Country: Spain
- Autonomous Community: Castile-La Mancha
- Province: Ciudad Real
- Comarca: Campo de Calatrava

Government
  - Mayor: Leopoldo Jerónimo Sierra Gallardo (PP)

Area
  - Total: 438 km^{2} (169 sq mi)
- Elevation (AMSL): 627 m (2,057 ft)

Population (2025-01-01)
  - Total: 17,722
  - Density: 40.5/km^{2} (105/sq mi)
- Time zone: UTC+1 (CET)
  - Summer (DST): UTC+2 (CEST (GMT +2))
- Postal code: 13250
- Area code: +34 (Spain) + 926 (Ciudad Real)
- Website: www.daimiel.es

Daimiel is a municipality in Ciudad Real, Castile-La Mancha, Spain. It has a population of 17,342, and a mechanical industry. The football club is Daimiel CF. The Tablas de Daimiel National Park, a well-known but endangered wetland natural reserve, lies partly within the boundaries of the town.

== History ==
Daimiel is the location of the Motilla del Azuer, a Bronze Age fortification.

A branch of the Medrano family established themselves in Daimiel, holding positions as high mayors, governors, and chief justices of the Order of Calatrava.

The "Martyrs of Daimiel" were killed here in 1936 during the Spanish Civil War.
