= Gregorio Prieto =

Spanish painter (1897–1992)

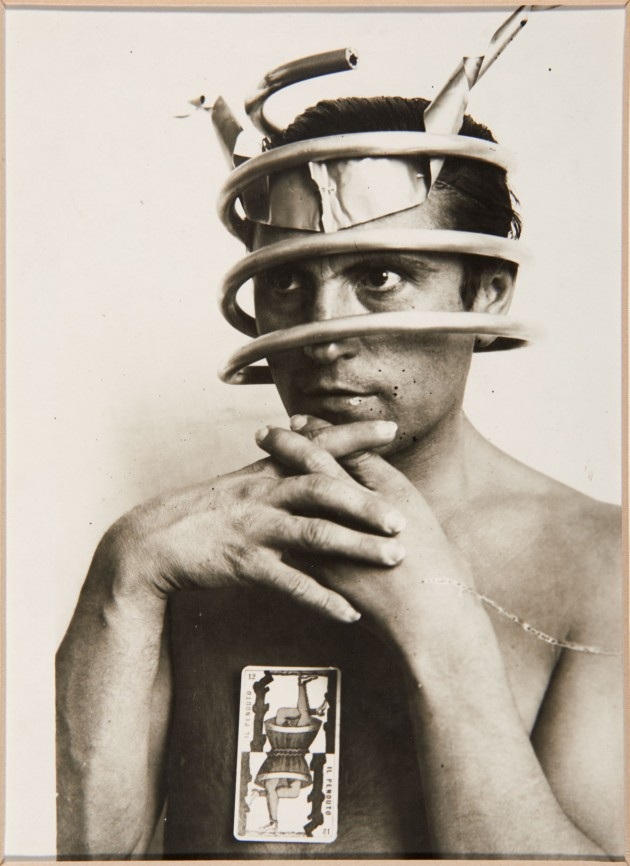
The artist in 1928

Gregorio Prieto Muñoz (2 May 1897 – 14 November 1992) was a Spanish painter associated with the Generation of '27.

== Life ==
He was born in Valdepeñas (where he later also died), the eighth son of Ildefonso Prieto (a cabinet-maker who seems to have studied architecture) and Froilana Muñoz (owner of a large shop in the town). When he was two, his mother died and his father remarried to Tadea Solance, who Gregorio always loved like a birth-mother. When he was four, he started drawing and then painting in watercolour, then when he was seven, the family moved to Madrid, where his father opened a cabinet shop.

== Works ==
=== Art ===
- Paintings and Drawings. With an Introduction by Luis Cernuda. London: The Falcon Press, 1947: 11 pages of introduction and 47 prints, with one of the prints in color..

== Bibliography (in Spanish) ==
- Enciclopedia biográfica española. Barcelona: J. M. Massó, 1955.
- García-Luengo Manchado, Javier (2016). Gregorio Prieto. Vida y obra (1897-1992) (in Spanish). Fundación Gregorio Prieto. ISBN 978-84-941693-3-5.
- Muñoz Sánchez, Oscar (coord.) (2018). Gregorio Prieto y sus libros (in Spanish). Fundación Gregorio Prieto, Madrid. ISBN 978-84-941693-5-9.
- Cruz Yabar, Almudena (coord.) (2014). Gregorio Prieto y la fotografía (in Spanish). Fundación Gregorio Prieto, Madrid. ISBN 978-84-941693-1-1.
- Salazar Herrería, Mª José (coord.) (1997). Gregorio Prieto en las vanguardias (in Spanish). Junta de Comunidades de Castilla-La Mancha. ISBN 84-7788-175-8.
- Corredor-Matheos, José (coord.) (1998). Gregorio Prieto (in Spanish). Fundación Gregorio Prieto, Madrid. ISBN 84-923459-0-X.
- Armero, Gonzalo (coord.) (1997). Gregorio Prieto y sus amigos poetas (in Spanish). Fundación Gregorio Prieto, Madrid. ISBN 84-88699-24-7.
- Muñoz Sánchez, Oscar (coord.) (2009). Gregorio Prieto. Arte gráfico (in Spanish). Fundación Gregorio Prieto, Madrid. ISBN 978-84-935953-1-9.
- García-Luengo Manchado, Javier (2018). El Museo de la Fundación Gregorio Prieto en 30 obras. Fundación Gregorio Prieto, Madrid. ISBN 978-84-941693-6-6.
