= Granátula de Calatrava =

Granátula de Calatrava Granátula
- Municipality
- Flag Coat of arms

- Location in Spain Granátula de Calatrava (Spain)
- Coordinates: 38°47′43″N 3°44′35″W
- Country: Spain
- Autonomous Community: Castile-La Mancha
- Province: Ciudad Real

Government
  - Mayor: Félix Herrera Carneros (PP)

Area
  - Total: 152.65 km^{2} (58.94 sq mi)

Population (2025-01-01)
  - Total: 683
  - Density: 4.47/km^{2} (11.6/sq mi)
- Demonym: Granatuleños
- Time zone: UTC+1 (CET)
- Website: Official website

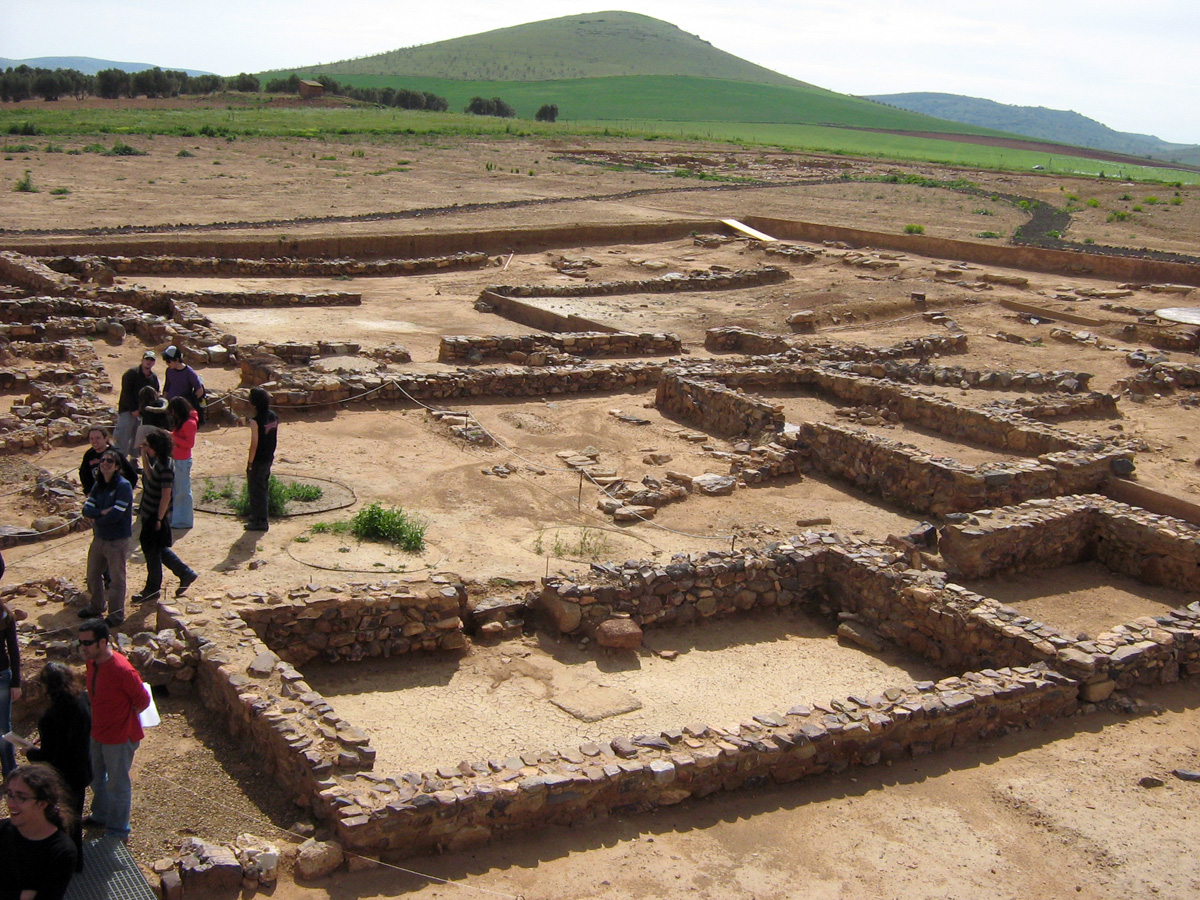
Oreto and Zuqueca archaeological site

Granátula de Calatrava is a municipality in the province of Ciudad Real, Castile-La Mancha, Spain.

The present-day town is located in the valley of the Jabalón river, in an area with Mediterranean-type agricultural resources from which olive oil, wine, cereals, almonds and various orchard products are obtained.

== Main sights ==
Archaeological sites include the Virgen de Oreto y Zuqueca (Oreto and Zuqueca) site, where Oretum, the ancient capital of Oretani was located. Also the Bronze Age site of La Encantada is within Granátula de Calatrava's municipal term. Other sights include the palace of the Torrubias, the House of the Inquisition, the parish church dedicated to Saint Anne, and the Sanctuary of Our Lady of Oreto and Zuqueca, which dates from the Middle Ages. The urban network shows the varied typology of Baroque buildings.

The landscape has been intensely altered by mankind, and therefore is full of manor houses, from small to large; bridges, water wheels, and the peasant stone refuges known as carapuchetes.

== Culture ==
Popular culture may be observed in a number of stone crosses, the so-called "armaos" ("armed ones") who make their appearance during Holy Week, as well as some 40 religious feasts, holidays and pageants that take place during the year. Tales and legends of yore, traditions and a rich gastronomy, as well as the work in mat-weed and lace also form part of the locality's lore.

== History ==
Granatula de Calatrava became nationally known after Baldomero Espartero, born in Granatula de Calatrava, became a national figure of great importance.
