= Torrenueva =

- Municipality
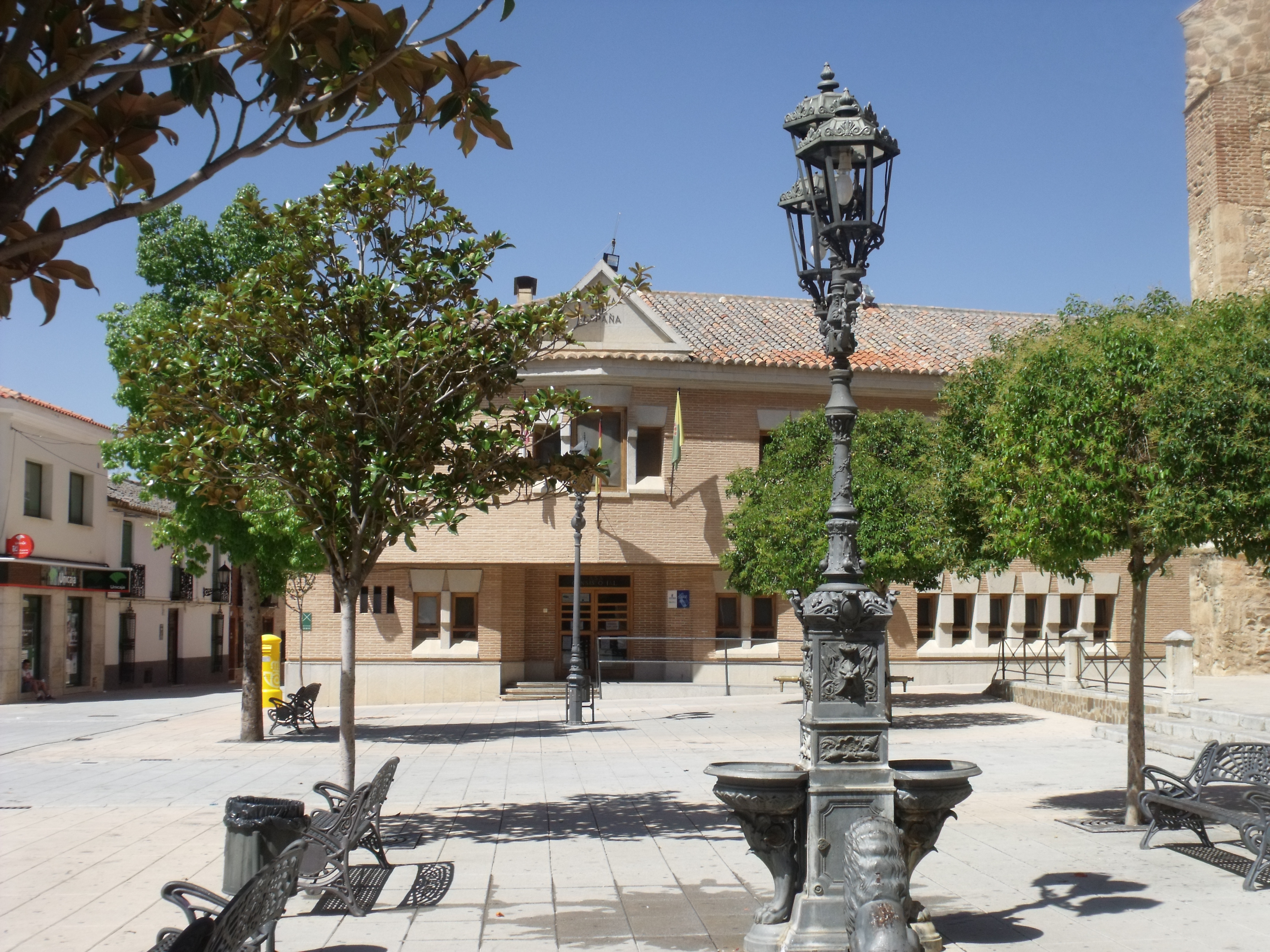
- Torrenueva Town Hall

- Flag Coat of arms

- Location within Spain
- Coordinates: 38°38′24.3″N 3°21′54.4″W
- Country: Spain
- Autonomous community: Castilla-La Mancha
- Province: Ciudad Real

Government
  - Mayor: Julián León

Area
  - Total: 142.2 km^{2} (54.9 sq mi)

Population (January 1, 2021)
  - Total: 2,637
  - Density: 18.54/km^{2} (48.0/sq mi)
- Time zone: UTC+01:00 (CET)
- Postal code: 13740
- Area code: 13085
- Website: Official website

Torrenueva is a municipality of Spain located in the province of Ciudad Real, autonomous community of Castile-La Mancha. It has a population of 2,637.

Torrenueva lies in the southern Meseta Central on the left bank of the Jabalón.

It was mentioned as early as 1243 as a settlement part of the Campo de Montiel, a dominion of the Order of Santiago. In 1440, it was gifted a carta puebla ('population charter') that acknowledged a series of privileges, including the right to enjoy its own council.
