= Francisco Abad Moreno "Chaleco" =

Spanish general

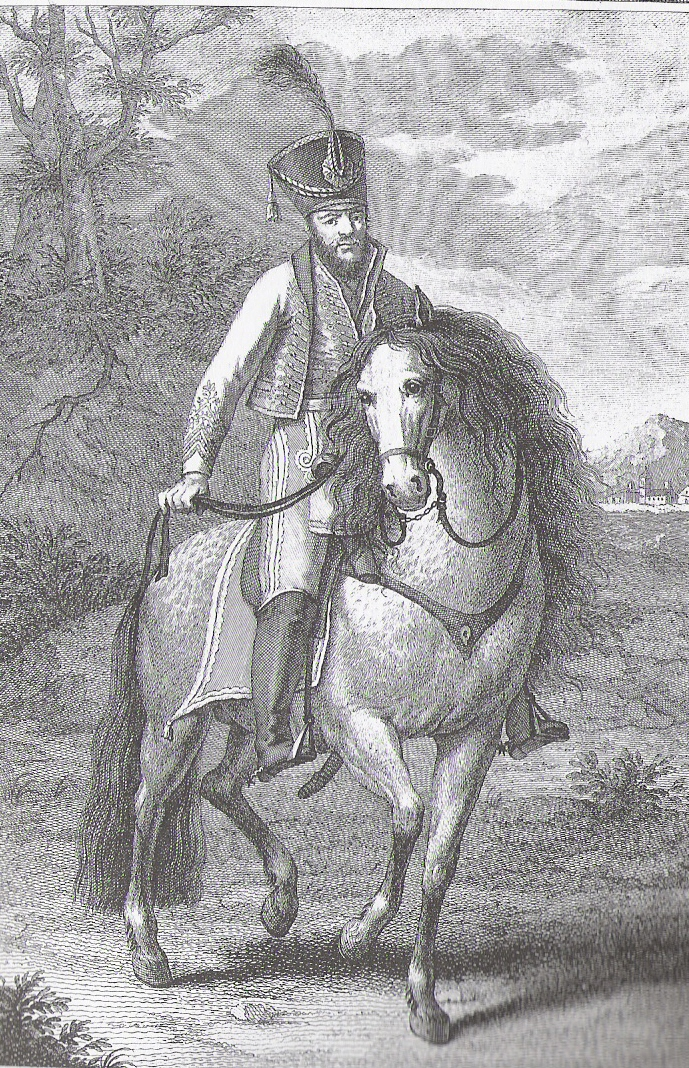
Francisco Chaleco.jpg

Francisco Abad Moreno, better known as "Chaleco", was one of many Spanish guerrilleros who came to prominence in the Spanish War of Independence.

Based around Valdepeñas, near the Sierra Morena that separates the central part of Spain form Andalusia, Chaleco, unlike many other guerrilleros, who were basically brigands, was a shepherd who had joined the fight against the French troops after his mother and brother were killed in the Valdepeñas Uprising in June 1808.

By December 1811, when it was incorporated into the Spanish Army as the Valdepeñas Hussars, his group of mounted guerrilleros numbered 300. By the end of the war, he had risen to the rank of colonel, due, in part, to the patronage of General Castaños, who had led the Spanish troops at the decisive Battle of Bailén. In 1815, he had gone on to head the Spanish 5th Army.

Although "Chaleco" was hanged at Granada in September 1827 for his part in the liberal plots against Ferdinand VII and fighting for the Liberals, travel writer George Borrow, in the course of his travels through Spain, around 1835–40, claimed to have had occasion to meet "Chaleco", a meeting he recorded as "The Gipsy Soldier of Valdepenas", in his two-volume The Zincali; or, an Account of the Gipsies of Spain. With an Original Collection of their Songs and Poetry, and a Copious Dictionary of their Language (1841).

== See also ==
- Guerrilla warfare in the Peninsular War
