= Jabalón =

River in central Spain

Jabalón River
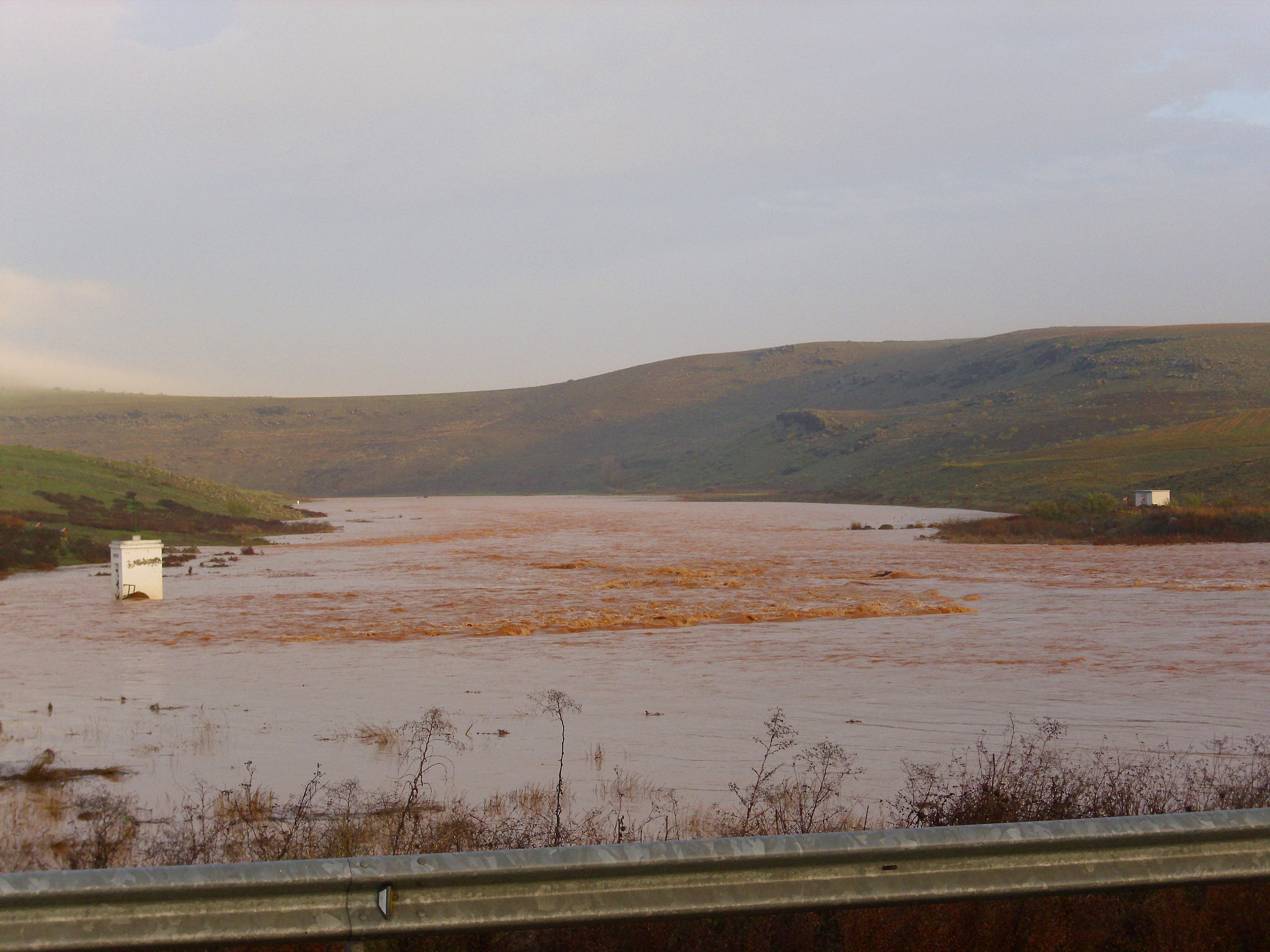

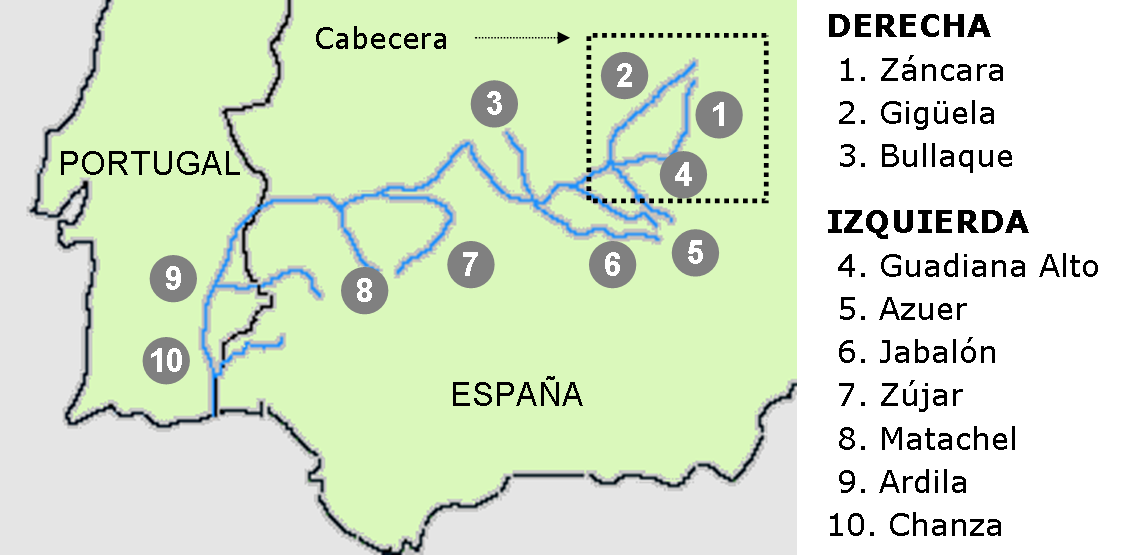
- Tributaries of the Guadiana (Jabalón is no. 6).

Location
- Country: Spain
- Region: Castilla–La Mancha, Ciudad Real

Physical characteristics
- Mouth: Guadiana River
  - coordinates: 38°53′23″N 4°05′28″W
- Length: 160.58 km (99.78 mi)
- Basin size: 1,557.5 km^{2} (601.4 sq mi)

Basin features
- Landmarks: Guadiana

The Jabalón River is a river in central Spain, serving as the primary left-bank tributary of the Guadiana River. Originating at a site known as "Los Ojos," approximately 5 km from the town of Montiel toward the road to Villanueva de la Fuente, the river flows 161 km through the Ciudad Real Province in an east-to-west direction. It eventually joins the Guadiana River near Corral de Calatrava after turning north.

== Etymology ==
The origin of the name "Jabalón" is debated. The most likely source is the Arabic word Jabal or Yabal, meaning "mountain." An alternative theory suggests a more ancient origin, linking it to a hydronym from Old European, possibly related to the etymon savu found in the nearby Amarguillo River and the toponym Consaburum (Consuegra). The river's banks have supported human settlements since prehistoric times, including the Bronze Age, pre-Roman Oretani tribes, Roman villas, Visigothic communities, Arab settlements, and modern populations.

== Geography ==
The Jabalón River flows through the Campo de Montiel, a region with low permeability due to its Triassic clay geology. From Valdepeñas onward, it enters the Campo de Calatrava, characterized by Tertiary and Quaternary alluvial materials.

The river's flow is irregular and often limited due to the region's low rainfall, leading to significant seasonal drying or minimal flow. The river frequently collects wastewater from nearby towns, prompting the creation of the Manserja consortium to manage water treatment and waste for the municipalities along its course.

== Reservoirs ==
The Jabalón River is impounded by two reservoirs:

- La Cabezuela Reservoir
  - Area: 565 ha
  - Municipalities: Valdepeñas and Torre de Juan Abad
  - Ownership: Public Hydraulic Domain
  - Capacity: 41 hm³
  - Elevation: 763 m above sea level
- La Vega del Jabalón Reservoir
  - Area: 629 ha
  - Municipalities: Calzada de Calatrava and Granátula de Calatrava
  - Ownership: Public Hydraulic Domain
  - Capacity: 33.4 hm³
  - Elevation: 639 m above sea level
