= Villanueva de la Fuente =

- Municipality
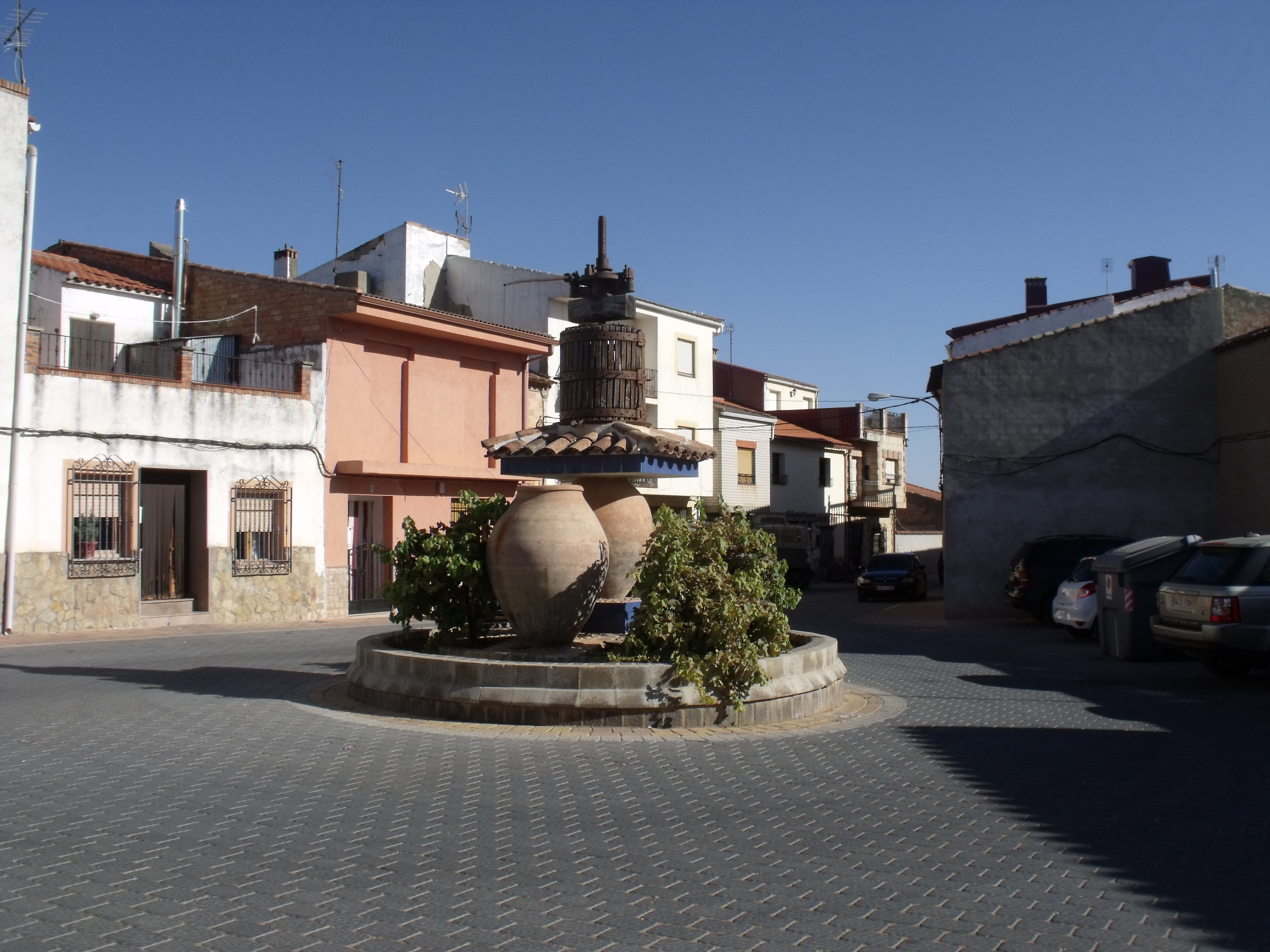

- Coat of arms

- Location in Spain
- Coordinates: 38°42′N 2°42′W
- Country: Spain
- Autonomous community: Castile-La Mancha
- Province: Ciudad Real
- Comarca: Campo de Montiel
- Commonwealth: Manserja

Government
  - Mayor: Francisco Morales González

Area
  - Total: 129.10 km^{2} (49.85 sq mi)
- Elevation: 1,005 m (3,297 ft)

Population (2025-01-01)
  - Total: 1,831
  - Density: 14.18/km^{2} (36.73/sq mi)
- Demonym: Villanoveros
- Time zone: UTC+1 (CET)
  - Summer (DST): UTC+2 (CEST)
- Postal code: 13330

Villanueva de la Fuente is a small village located in the Province of Ciudad Real, in the region of Castile-La Mancha, Spain.

In the past it was a Roman village called Mentesa which was a typical crossroads in the Roman period. Prominent festivals take place in May during La Romeria de Mayo, and the 31 of August which is the beginning of the Festival of the people.

Tourist sights include the mountains of Alcaraz and the river of Villanueva. La Ermita de los Desamparados is a pilgrimage place.
