= List of rail accidents in Spain =

This is a list of rail accidents in Spain.

== Rail accidents in Spain ==
=== Before 1920 ===
Accident	Date	Location	Killed	Injured	Description	Ref.
Channel of Manzanares bridge derailment	November 28, 1852	Vallecas, (currently) district of Madrid (M)	2	19	A passenger train from Madrid to Aranjuez derailed. First accident with fatal victims in the Spanish railways net that no were run-over of person or vehicles that appears in the preserved Spanish historic press.	
Abroñigal stream bridge accident	September 27, 1855	Madrid (M)	5	1	Collapse of Abroñigal stream bridge in the railway from Madrid to Alicante when a locomotive was crossing it.	
Mail train of Albacete fire	September 16, 1856	Huerta de Valdecarábanos – Villasequilla de Yepes (TO)	5	1	Fire in a coach of mail train from Albacete to Madrid.	
Almansa derailment of 1859	November 28, 1859	Almansa – Alpera (AB)	4	9	Derailment of mail train from Alicante to Madrid.	
La Violada train crash of 1861	July 27, 1861 ?	Unknown place on Zaragoza to Barcelona railway in the Province of Zaragoza	9 ?	1+ ?	Crash between two works trains.	
Barcelona derailment of 1863	February 5, 1863 ?	Barcelona (B)	5	1+ ?	Derailment of a works train on the railway to Sarriá.	
Alabern bridge disaster	October 7, 1863	Hostalric (GE/GI)	21	11	Derailment over Riera Seca bridge of the mail train Girona-Barcelona.	
Daimiel station accident of 1866	December 9, 1866	Daimiel (CR)	7	27	A locomotive that was realizing duties of explorer for a royal train ran over a group of people.	
Jerez – El Cuervo derailment	January 2, 1871	Jerez de la Frontera – El Cuervo (CA/SE)	7	22	Derailment of mail train from Cádiz to Seville	
Riera de San Jorge bridge disaster	September 7, 1872	L'Ametlla de Mar (T)	15	27	Bridge of San Jorge cliff collapsed when the mail train Barcelona - Valencia went across it.	
Viana de Cega derailment	September 11, 1873	Viana de Cega (VA)	21	58	Express train travelling from French borderline pass in Irún to Madrid derailed over river Duero bridge on the main railway of the North of Spain.	
Montabliz train crash of 1874	March 12, 1874	Montabliz, Bárcena de Pie de Concha (CAN)	9	22	Collision of runaway string of cars of a freight train with a troops train.	
Vallada – Montesa crash or 1874	September 11, 1874	Vallada – Montesa (V)	4	75	Rear-end collision of runaway string of cars of a mixed train with a freight train.	
Tarrega derailment	June 24, 1876	Tàrrega (LE/LL)	14	60	Mail train Zaragoza - Barcelona derailed at a curve between stations of Tàrrega and Cervera de Segarra.	
Cádiz derailment of 1879	May 9, 1879	Cádiz (CA)	5	8	Derailment of mail train from Madrid to Cádiz	
Montabliz train crash of 1880	October 15, 1880	Montabliz, Bárcena de Pie de Concha (CAN)	6	5	Collision of a string of two runaway freight cars with a works train.	
Barcelona derailment of 1882	May 24, 1882	Barcelona (B)	5	20	Derailment of mail train from Portbou to Barcelona.	
River Alcudia bridge train disaster	April 27, 1884	Chillón - Almadenejos (CR)	59	56	A passenger train carrying troops fell into the Alcúdia river after a bridge collapsed due to sabotage.	
San Pol – Canet train crash	May 19, 1888	San Pol de Mar - Canet de Mar (B)	8	200 (approx.)	Collision of a passenger train travelling from Barcelona with a freight train	
Burgos train crash	September 23, 1891	Burgos (BU)	15	125	Collision of express train Irún - Madrid with mixed train Madrid - Irún between stations of Burgos and Quintanilleja.	
Bilbao train derailment	July 7, 1894	Bilbao (BI)	14	17	Derailment of a passenger train Bilbao - Lezama on the strong ramp of Zurbarán.	
Obejo train accident of 1900	December 8, 1900	Obejo (CO)	6	21	Collision of a freight train with a works train.	
Montalvo bridge train derailment	June 27, 1903	Torremontalbo (LR)	44	84	A train from Bilbao derailed near La Rioja while crossing the Montalvo bridge and crashed into the Nanjerilla river.	
Cercedilla train crash	November 20, 1903	Cercedilla (M)	5	17	Collision of a mixed train with a freight train.	
Alcaudete train disaster	December 12, 1903	Alcaudete (J)	6	19	Derailment of mail train Málaga - Madrid.	
Luco de Jiloca train derailment	June 22, 1904	Calamocha - Luco de Jiloca (TE)	6+ ?	20	Mail train Valencia - Calatayud derailed on the bridge of Entrambasaguas over Pancrudo stream (a small tributary of the Jiloca river). After the derailment the train caught fire.	
Cambrils train derailment	November 25, 1907	Cambrils (T)	15	51	An express train from Valencia to Barcelona derailed on the Ardiaca bridge between Hospitalet and Cambrils and fell into the river.	
Alicante train derailment	October 4, 1912	Alicante (A)	5	30	A passenger train derailed when approaching Alicante station and crashed into a building.	
Irún train crash of 1913	July 13, 1913	Irún (GUI)	6	26	Head-on collision of two passenger trains in the narrow gauge railway from San Sebastián to Hendaye.	
Almoradí crossing accident	October 6, 1914	Almoradí (A)	5	1	A freight train crashed into a car in a crossing.	
Posada del Cabo Moreno train crash	October 7, 1914	Melilla	4	34	Collision of two freight trains happened in the old railway from Melilla port to San Juan iron ore mines (disappeared).	
Frieira train derailment	March 10, 1915	Frieira, near Vigo (PO)	19	25	An express train crashed into a huge rock that had fallen onto the tracks.	
Bilbao derailment of August 1917	August 13, 1917	Bilbao (BI)	6	18	Derailment of mail train from Barcelona to Bilbao due to have been put on the tracks some rocks during a strike.	
Pozaldez train crash	September 23, 1917	Pozaldez - Matapozuelos (VA)	13	37	Collision of Mail train Irún - Madrid with mixed train Santander - Madrid.	
Medina del Campo boiler explosion	January 10, 1918	Medina del Campo (VA)	14	15	Boiler explosion of the locomotive of mail train from Medina del Campo to Portuguese Borderline pass in Fuentes de Oñoro (SA).	
Binefar train crash	February 16, 1918	Binefar - Tamarite de Litera (HU)	8	29	Mail train from Barcelona to Zaragoza collided with a freight train.	
Barcelona crossing accident of 1918	March 5, 1918	Barcelona (B)	5	24	A freight train crashed into a tram in a crossing.	
Celrá train crash	October 12, 1918	Celrà (GE/GI)	7	36	A special train of passengers travelling from Barcelona to Portbou crashed into a freight train that was realizing a manoeuvre in the named station.	

=== 1920–1929 ===
Accident	Date	Location	Killed	Injured	Description	Ref.
La Balanzona derailment	January 23, 1920	Córdoba (CO)	7+ ?	20	Derailment of a mixed train in a ramp due a brakes failure.	
Sabadell train crash of June 1920	June 21, 1920	Sabadell (B)	5	3	A runaway string of freight cars collided with a freight train.	
Villaverde bajo station train crash	June 11, 1921	Madrid (M)	9	23	Crash of express train Madrid - Cádiz and mail train Toledo - Madrid.	
Villagonzalo derailment	October 12, 1921	Villagonzalo (BA)	12	76	Derailment of mail train Badajoz - Madrid.	
Los Barrios crossing accident of January 1922	January 20, 1922	Los Barrios (CA)	5	2	A military train crash into a car at a crossing.	
Paredes de Nava train crash	July 11, 1922	Paredes de Nava (P)	33	50+	Collision of mail train Madrid - Gijón with fast train Coruña - Madrid.	
Ontinyent train crash	December 22, 1922	Ontinyent (V)	12	100+	Collision of a troops train with a freight train.	
Villaverde Alto crossing accident of April 1924	April 5, 1924	Villaverde, district of Madrid (M)	5	4	A train travelling from Portuguese Borderline crash at a crossing into a military truck of the Spanish Air Force.	
Sarria train derailment	April 9, 1925	Sarrià, Barcelona (B)	24	100+	An electric train crashed into the wall of a tunnel.	
Avileses crossing crash	July 4, 1925	Avileses, Murcia, (MU)	6	1	A train ran over a car	
Hervás derailment of April 1926	April 29, 1926	Hervás – Baños de Montemayor, (CC)	5	26	Derailment of mail train from Astorga to Plasencia.	
L'Ametlla train derailment	September 1, 1926	L'Ametlla de Mar - L'Ampolla (T)	21	130	Mail train from Barcelona to Valencia derailed near Tortosa.	
Pulpí train crash	May 25, 1927	Pulpí (AL)	17+ ?	20+	An iron ore freight train lost its brakes in a ramp and collided at Pulpí station with mail train from Almendricos to Águilas.	
Las Madrigueras train crash	September 28, 1928	Las Madrigueras station, Linares (J)	10	10	Head-on collision of express Madrid - Algeciras with the express Málaga - Madrid	
Gelida train accident	December 19, 1929	Gelida (B)	17	8	A passenger train crashed into a bus at a railroad crossing between San Sadurni de Noya and Gelida.	

=== 1930–1939 ===
Accident	Date	Location	Killed	Injured	Description	Ref.
Gilet railroad crossing accident	April 17, 1930	Gilet (V)	13	20	An iron-ore train travelling from Ojos negros mines to Sagunto steelworks collided with a bus at a railroad crossing.	
Cuadros train crash	December 17, 1930	Cuadros - Santibáñez (LE)	12	28	Collision of express train Gijón - Madrid with a freight train.	
Tunnel nr. 8 of Córdoba – Bélmez derailment	December 26, 1932	San Bernardo, Espiel (CO)	5	3	Derailment of a mixed train.	
Unquera crossing accident of 1933	October 11, 1933	Unquera, Val de San Vicente (CAN)	6	0	A train crashed into a car at a crossing.	
Puzol derailment	December 9, 1933	Puzol (V)	24+ ?	100+	Derailment of express train Barcelona - Seville due to sabotage of the tracks during a strike.	
Andújar train crash	February 19, 1934	Andújar - Villanueva de la Reina (J)	11	50	Head-on collision of express train Cádiz - Madrid with a special passengers train travelling from Madrid to Seville.	
Sant Boi de Llobregat train crash	May 21, 1934	Sant Boi de Llobregat (B)	12	21	Two trains crashed near Sant Boi de Llobregat after an engineer mistook a whistle for a starting signal.	
Pola de Gordón railroad crossing accident	June 10, 1934	Pola de Gordón (LE)	20	11	Collision of a freight train with a bus at a railroad crossing.	
Ponferrada - San Miguel train crash	June 23, 1936	Ponferrada - San Miguel de las Dueñas (LE)	19	33	Collision of mail train Madrid - Coruña with a freight train into a tunnel.	
Añorga derailment of 1936	July 12, 1936	Añorga, San Sebastián (GUI)	4	50+	Derailment of a passenger train from Bilbao to San Sebastián.	
Tunnel of Ulibarri disaster	April 9, 1937	Bilbao (BI)	16+	40+	A train ran over a numerous group of people that had taken refuge due to a bombing raid into a tunnel of the Bilbao - Lezama railway near Ulibarri quarter.	
Bilbao derailment of April 1937	April 13, 1937 ?	¿Sestao? (BI)	6	30	Derailment of a passenger train.	
Cieza crossing disaster	July 15, 1937	Cieza (MU)	14	200+	Mail train from Cartagena to Madrid collided with a military truck loaded of explosives at a Murcia - Madrid road level crossing.	
Alanís train crash	November 19, 1937	Alanís de la Sierra (SE)	72	160+	A prisoners of war train collided with a freight train in the station of Alanis de la Sierra.	
Freginals derailment	December 4, 1937	Freginals - Planes de Montsiá (T)	12	60+	Mail train from Valencia to Barcelona collided with a runaway car and derailed, fell to the Galera stream cliff.	
Valencia – Alameda station train crash of December 1937	December 4, 1937	Valencia (V)	7	21	Collision in the entrance of Alameda station of mail train from Teruel to Valencia with an electric commuter train of suburban net of Valencia.	
Underground of Madrid explosion	January 10, 1938	Madrid (M)	98+ ?	100+ ?	During Spanish Civil War of 1936–1939, an important stock of war material for the republican army stored in a tunnel under building of the underground metropolitan railway of Madrid exploded. Effects of explosion spread for the rest of metro net tunnels and four trains were damaged. Official number of fatal victims were 98, but probably were more.	
Reus train crash	March 6, 1938	Reus (T)	19	168	Collision of a passenger train with a freight train.	
Meliana crossing accident	March 29, 1938	Meliana (V)	23 ?	Unknown	Collision at a railroad crossing of a passenger train with a truck loaded with gasoline.	
Sarriá de Ter train accident	September 7, 1938	Sarriá de Ter (GE/GI)	19	21	A train caught fire after colliding with a truck loaded with gasoline at a railroad crossing.	
Figaredo derailment	September 10, 1938	Figaredo, Mieres (AS)	10 ?	30 (approx.)	Derailment of mail train from Collanzo to Mieres, falling this into river Caudal.	
Martorell train crash	September 25, 1938	Martorell - Castellbisbal (B)	65	200	Collision of two trains.	
Sant Vicent de Calders train bombing	October 8, 1938	San Vicente de Calders, Vendrell (T)	60	100	Bombing raid on a passenger train.	
Ciudad Real hospital train crash	October 15, 1938	Ciudad Real (CR)	12	1+	Crash of a hospital train that carried injured in action soldiers of the Republican Army into two locomotives that were parked in Ciudad Real Station. There was twelve dead people and more injured, but number of them, due to the war censure, is unknown.	
Alpera train crash of December 1938	December 16, 1938 ?	Alpera – Bonete (AB)	7	50 (Approx.)	Collision of two trains.	
Valencia tram crash of January 1939	January 1, 1939 ?	Valencia (V)	7	16	Collision of a commuter train and a tram in a crossing.	
Castro Urdiales delailment of January 1939	January 1, 1939	Castro Urdiales (CAN)	7	20	Derailment of a passenger train.	
Barcelona - Plaza Molina Station train crash	February 11, 1939	Barcelona (B)	32	100+	A passenger train crashed into the rear of a freight train, probably due to defective brakes.	
Xàtiva station bombing	February 12, 1939	Xàtiva (V)	129	200+	Aircraft bombing over a military train that carried the 49th mixed brigade of the republican army while it was standing in the named station.	
Ormáiztegui Sudexpress derailment	March 28, 1939	Ormaiztegi (GUI)	3+ ?	30	Derailment of Sudexpress train of Lisbon to Paris. Number of dead people were 3 probably, some press media referers a higher number of killed, including 20 (less probable).	
Campanillas train crash of May 1939	May 23, 1939	Campanillas (MA)	7	40	Collision of two passenger trains.	
Peñaranda de Bracamonte explosion	July 9, 1939	Peñaranda de Bracamonte (SA)	100+	1500 (Approx.)	Three freight cars that were parked in Peñaranda de Bracamonte station containing 23500 kg (over 52000 lb)of TNT exploded due a fire, and the explosion reach the station's stores that containing 107000 kg (236000 lb) of explosives which exploded too.	

=== 1940–1949 ===
Accident	Date	Location	Killed	Injured	Description	Ref.
Velilla de Ebro train crash	December 3, 1940	Velilla de Ebro (Z)	53	58	Collision of express trains Madrid - Barcelona and Barcelona - Madrid.	
Montabliz train crash of 1941	January 20, 1941	Montabliz, Bárcena de Pie de Concha (CAN)	5	14	Collision of mail train from Madrid to Santander with a mixed train.	
San Pablo – Jimena train crash	January 28, 1941	San Pablo de Buceite - Jimena de la Frontera (CA)	6	11	Collision of a freight train with a mixed train.	
Zumaya train derailment	February 15, 1941	Zumaya (GUI)	26	120	An electric train was blown off a bridge into the Urola river by strong winds.	
Pola de Gordón train crash	July 25, 1941	La Pola de Gordón (LE)	11	20	Collision of mail train from Madrid to Gijón with a locomotive that was stopped for removing a tree fallen on the tracks due a strong wind.	
Tablada derailment	September 1, 1941	Seville (SE)	8	16	Derailment at a railroad crossing of a passenger train of workers of aircraft national factory located in the industrial area of Tablada, near Seville port.	
Tejares derailment	October 8, 1941	Tejares, quarter of Salamanca (SA)	12	37	Derailment of fast train from Ciudad Rodrigo to Medina del Campo at a curve near to Salud bridge over river Tormes in the railway from Salamanca to Fuentes de Oñoro.	
Almassora station explosion	December 7, 1941	Almassora (CS)	6	5	Explosion of a freight car that was parked in the RENFE Station of Almassora.	
Seville crossing accident of 1941	December 12, 1941	Seville (SE)	5	2	Crash of a train into a car in a crossing.	
Riudecanyes train crash of December 1942	December 21, 1942	Riudecanyes (T)	6	4	Collision of a freigt train with two railcars of track maintenance.	
Moreda mail of Almería derailment of 1943	October 15, 1943	Moreda (GR)	20	100+	Derailment of mail train from Linares to Almería a fall of three coaches into a cliff. No information is written in Spanish press due to the censure.	
Fiñana train crash	December 27, 1943	Fiñana (AL)	10	1	Collision of two freight trains.	
Torre del Bierzo rail disaster	January 3, 1944	Torre del Bierzo (LE)	250 (approx.) ?	Unknown	Double collision into the tunnel nr. 20 of Palencia - Ponferrada railway of Madrid - Coruña mail train and two freight trains. Some media refers exaggerately 500-800 dead. According judge report who carried out the investigation no more than 80 deaths were definitely identified.	
Arévalo train crash (1944)	January 11, 1944	Arévalo (AV)	41	78	Collision of express Madrid - Irún with Mail train from A Coruña to Madrid, which the last was standing in the Arévalo Station.	
Las Alcubillas train crash	November 15, 1945	Las Alcubillas, Gérgal (AL)	17+ ?	39	Collision of a passenger train with a freight train between Fuente Santa and Gérgal after a wrong signal. Official number of dead 17, some media refers more, including 100 fatal victims.	
Matillas train crash	December 20, 1945	Matillas (GU)	9	21	Collision of Mail train Madrid - Barcelona with a freight train.	
Cinco Casas train crash	December 17, 1946	Cinco Casas, Alcázar de San Juan (CR)	22	82	An express train crashed into a string of eighteen freight cars runaway due a broken hook of a freight train in manoeuvres into the named station.	
Lezama – Antomaña train crash of 1947	April 6, 1947	Lezama – Antomaña, Amurrio (ALA/ARA)	5	6	Collision of two freight trains.	
Emperador station train crash	May 10, 1947	Emperador station, Fernán Caballero (CR)	13	18	A mail train crashed into a standing freight train after being switched onto the wrong tracks.	
Ribota stream bridge derailment	August 30, 1947	Clarés de Ribota - Villarroya de la Sierra (Z)	15	20	A train fell into the Ribota stream after a bridge collapse.	
Pozuelo de Alarcón train crash of February 1948	February 5, 1948	Pozuelo de Alarcón (M)	4	53	Rear-end crash of mixed train from Valladolid and Astorga into two electric units that are stopped at the entrance of Pozuelo station due to a faulty of the catenary.	
San Fernando crash of July 1948	July 1, 1948	San Fernando de Henares (M)	4	60+	Collision of fast train from Castejón and Soria to Madrid with a runaway string of cars of a freight train.	
Mora la Nova train derailment	February 12, 1949	Els Guiamets - Mora la Nova, (T)	31	81	A passenger train from Barcelona to Madrid derailed between Mora la Nova and Els Guiamets, probably due to sabotage of the tracks.	
Marañón runover of August 1949	August 5, 1949	Marañón station, Alcázar de San Juan (CR)	5	1	A group of people that were crossing the tracks of Marañón station were run over by express train from Madrid to Algeciras, which no had programmed stop in the named station.	
Las Matas train crash	November 7, 1949	Las Matas, Las Rozas de Madrid (M)	14	41	Rear-End crash of electric trains from Madrid to Segovia and Ávila	

=== 1950–1959 ===
Accident	Date	Location	Killed	Injured	Description	Ref.
Bobadilla derailment of 1950	March 30, 1950	Bobadilla, Antequera (MA)	8	30	Derailment of mail train from Madrid to Málaga on a switcher of Bobadilla station.	
Villallana train derailment	April 6, 1950	Villallana, Lena (AS)	19	65	Mail train Madrid - Gijón derailed and plunged down an embankment.	
Ciempozuelos Cádiz express derailment of 1950	May 15, 1950	Ciempozuelos - Valdemoro (M)	3	58	Derailment of express from Madrid to Cádiz.	
Pajares mail train to Madrid fire	December 3, 1950	Pajares, Lena (AS)	5	16	Fire of mail train from Gijón to Madrid into the tunnel nr. 13 of León to Gijón railway, located in the zone of Pajares mountain pass.	
Cecebre train crash of 1950	December 6, 1950	Cecebre, Cambre (C)	5	10 (Approx.)	Collision of mail train from Madrid to La Coruña with a railcar that did an omnibus service from last city to Ferrol.	
Tortosa train accident	January 23, 1951	Tortosa (T)	14	27	A mail train travelling from Valencia to Barcelona crashed into a truck at a crossing.	
Pobladura crossing accident of 1951	August 24, 1951	Pobladura del Valle – Benavente (ZA)	7	0	Collision of a freight with a truck of an electrical company at a crossing.	
Padrón train crash of 1952	May 20, 1952	Padrón – La Esclavitud (C)	12	50+	Collision of Madrid to Santiago express with a runaway string of tank cars loaded with gasoline and further fire.	
Bridge of Toledo tram accident	May 28, 1952	Madrid (M)	15	112	A tram of nr. 31 in service from Main Square to Carabanchel lost its brakes over ramp of Toledo street and reach the bridge of Toledo, fell into river Manzanares.	
Mislata crossing accident	September 16, 1952	Mislata (V)	5	26	A freight train collided with a tram in the Mislata station crossing.	
Icaria Avenue crossing accident of 1952	November 5, 1952	Barcelona (B)	4	39	A freight train collided with a tram in the crossing of avenida de Icaria, in the city of Barcelona.	
Vadollano express of Seville derailment of 1952	November 20, 1952	Cabrerizas, Vilches – Vadollano station, Linares (J)	4	57	Derailment of express train from Seville to Madrid.	
Monistrol de Montserrat train crash	July 25, 1953	Monistrol de Montserrat (B)	8	122	Three trains collided after brakes failed on one of them while driving up to Abbey of mountain of Montserrat.	
El Orcajo - La Garganta train crash	September 28, 1953	La Garganta - Minas del Orcajo, Brazatortas (CR)	8	5	A passenger train from Peñarroya to Puertollano collided rear-end with a works train.	
Coreses crossing accident of 1954	June 21, 1954	Coreses (ZA)	6	0	A railcar crash into a car in a crossing.	
Los Molinos station train crash	July 7, 1954	Los Molinos (M)	7	24	Collision of a passenger train from Madrid to Segovia with a freight train.	
Los Jarales bridge collapse	August 2, 1954	Los Jarales, Fregenal de la Sierra (BA)	13	1	A bridge collapsed when a freight train crossed it.	
Puente Genil express of Málaga derailment of 1954	August 23, 1954	Puente Genil (CO)	4	51	Derailment of express train from Málaga to Madrid.	
San Javier crossing accident	December 13, 1954	San Javier (MU)	6	15	Crash of a locomotive into a bus in a crossing.	
Cancienes train crash	April 16, 1955	Cancienes, Corvera (AS)	5	6	An omnibus train from San Juan de Nieva to Villabona collided with a freight train loaded with coal.	
Orejo train crash of 1956	February 9, 1956	Orejo, Marina de Cudeyo (CAN)	5	2	A mixed train crashed into a freight car and the structure of a bridge.	
Madrid - Santa Catalina station train crash	June 24, 1956	Madrid (M)	10	76	Mail Train Madrid - Seville collided with a freight train.	
Quereño – Sobradelo derailment of 1956	December 28, 1956	Quereño – Sobradelo (OR/OU)	5	49	Derailment of mail train from Madrid to La Coruña.	
Villaverde Orcasitas train crash	August 4, 1957	Villaverde, District of Madrid (M)	21	68	A train transporting troops from a maneuver crashed into a standing locomotive. Official number of victims: 17 dead, 39 injured.	
Morés train crash of 1959	August 24, 1959	Morés (Z)	5	38	Express train from Barcelona to La Coruña crashed into a freight train which was standing in Morés station.	

=== 1960–1969 ===
Accident	Date	Location	Killed	Injured	Description	Ref.
Monsolís train accident	July 19, 1960	Monsolís, Montgat (B)	9	2	A train ran over a brigade of tracks maintenance.	
Belalcázar train derailment	September 5, 1960	Belalcázar (CO)	0	85	A passenger train fell into a ravine between Belalcázar and Las Cabras.	
Palancares tunnel accident	November 7, 1960	Cuenca – Cañada del Hoyo (CU)	5	30	Tunnel of Palancares were flooded by smoke of locomotive of mixed train from Cuenca to Utiel when this was paralyzed into the same tunnel due a breakdown.	
Arrigorriaga crossing accident of 1960	November 26, 1960	Arrigorriaga (BI)	5	11	A freight train crashed into a bus at a crossing.	
Hospitalet de Llobregat train crash	January 9, 1961	Hospitalet de Llobregat (B)	25	50	A passenger train coming from Valencia crashed into the rear of a freight train.	
Montcada direct of Lérida derailment of 1961	August 26, 1961	Montcada i Reixac (B)	4	54	Derailment of direct train from Lérida to Barcelona.	
Villafranca de los Barros train crash	September 18, 1961	Villafranca de los Barros (BA)	17	20+	Four runaway wagons from a freight train crashed into a passenger train.	
Ujo crossing accident of 1962	August 16, 1962	Ujo (AS)	2	32	High speed RENFE train from Madrid to Gijón (T.A.F.) crashed into a local bus at an unsignaled crossing.	
Abejera – Serracín train crash of 1962	November 3, 1962	Abejera – Sarracín de Aliste, Riofrío de Aliste (ZA)	5	5	Collision of express trains from Madrid to Vigo and Vigo to Madrid.	
Tardienta – Almudévar train crash of 1963	February 25, 1963	Tardienta – Almudévar (HU)	5	9	Collision of Barcelona to La Coruña express train with a string of cars runaway from a freight train.	
Gor crossing accident of 1963	June 18, 1963	Gor (GR)	6	0	Crash of a train into a car at a crossing.	
Sant Vicent de Calders train crash of 1964	February 7, 1964	Sant Vicent de Calders, Vendrell (T)	3	54	Collision of two passenger trains.	
Grisén - Pinseque train fire	February 10, 1965	Grisén - Pinseque (Z)	34	33	A train caught fire while travelling from Madrid to Barcelona.	
Oreitia crossing accident of 1965	June 28, 1965	Oreitia, quarter of Vitoria (ALA/ARA)	6	0	A freight train crashed into a car at a crossing.	
El Arahal crossing accident	June 30, 1965	El Arahal (SE)	12	30	A train crashed into a bus in a crossing	
Gérgal - Fuente Santa train crash (1965)	August 16, 1965	Gérgal - Fuente Santa (AL)	10	53	Mail train from Almería to Madrid collided with a freight train.	
Villar de los Álamos train crash	December 18, 1965	Villar de los Álamos, Aldehuela de la Bóveda (SA)	34	50+	A Lisbon-bound train coming from Paris crashed into omnibus train from Fuentes de Oñoro to Medina del Campo when missing signals due to heavy fog.	
Barcelona – Plaza de España station fire	September 8, 1966	Barcelona (B)	3	115	Fire of a train that was standing in the underground station of Plaza de España in Barcelona.	
Villafranca del Campo train crash	December 18, 1966	Villafranca del Campo (TE)	30	6	A freight train collided with a passenger train between Santa Eulalia del Campo and Villafranca del Campo, after missing signals due to fog.	
Tarrasa crossing accident of 1966	December 26, 1966	Tarrasa (B)	5	0	Crash of a train into a car at a crossing.	
Villalbilla crossing accident	July 3, 1967	Villalbilla (BU)	6	30	Collision of a freight train with a bus at a crossing.	
Astorga crossing accident of July 1967	July 19, 1967	Astorga (LE)	7	0	Collision of a freight train with a car at a crossing.	
La Puebla de Híjar crossing accident of 1967	October 9, 1967	La Puebla de Híjar (TE)	6	0	Crash of a train into a van at a crossing.	
Santa Maria de la Alameda train crash	March 15, 1968	Santa Maria de la Alameda - Robledo de Chavela (M)	28	80	A passenger train crashed into a trolley between Santa Maria de la Alameda and Robledo de Chavela and caught fire.	
Medina del Campo train crash (1968)	July 13, 1968	Medina del Campo (VA)	9	60+	A passenger train crashed into a freight train	

=== 1970–1979 ===
Accident	Date	Location	Killed	Injured	Description	Ref.
Plentzia train crash	August 9, 1970	Urduliz - Plentzia (BI)	33	160	A passenger train collided with another train near Legarrés quarter, between Urduliz and Plentzia, after getting a wrong signal.	
Marmolejo train crash	September 11, 1971	Marmolejo - Arjonilla (CO)	6	25	A Talgo express train crashed into the rear of a freight train.	
Corcos – Cabezón crossing accident of 1972	March 7, 1972	Corcos – Cabezón de Pisuerga (VA)	5	8	Crash of an electric passenger train from Madrid to Santander into a truck at a crossing.	
El Cuervo railway accident railbus/ express crash	July 21, 1972	El Cuervo - Lebrija (SE)	86	103	A Ferrobus (RENFE class 591 railcar) collided with express train from Madrid to Cádiz after departing wrongly from El Cuervo Station.	
La Llagosta crossing accident of 1974	July 26, 1974	La Llagosta (B)	3	58	Crash of An electric passenger train into a truck at a crossing.	
Almansa crossing accident of 1974	July 29, 1974	Almansa (AB)	5	0	Collision of a car with a freight train at a crossing due a failure of brakes of the first.	.
Pitis – Pinar de las Rozas train crash of 1975	April 16, 1975	Madrid – Las Rozas de Madrid (M)	3	50+	Collision of a freight train with a commuter passenger train of Madrid suburban net.	
Bamio – Vilagarcía derailment of 1975	August 12, 1975	Bamio – Vilagarcía de Arousa (PO)	6	40+	Derailment of a railcar.	
Underground of Barcelona train crash of 1975	October 30, 1975	Barcelona (B)	5 ?	100+	Collision of two trains of metropolitan underground railway of Barcelona, happened in the station of Virrey Amat.	
Laza – Vilar del Barrio derailment of 1975	November 8, 1975	Laza - Vilar de Barrio (OR/OU)	5	9	Derailment of express train from Madrid to Vigo and Pontevedra into a tunnel.	
Vigo train crash	September 9, 1976	Rande, Vigo (PO)	15	35	A passenger train crashed into a locomotive, apparently due to a signal failure.	
Massalfassar crossing accident	November 23, 1976	Massalfassar (V)	14	21	Fast train from Barcelona to Valencia crashed into a truck at a crossing.	
Manresa crossing accident of 1977	January 20, 1977	Manresa (B)	4	27	A passenger train crashed into a truck at a crossing.	
Sant Andreu de la Barca (Barcelona) train crash	February 28, 1977	Sant Andreu de la Barca (B)	22	85	Collision of two commuter trains.	
Quintanavides crossing accident of 1977	May 27, 1977	Quintanavides (BU)	5	21	Collision of a passenger train with a truck at a crossing.	
Villajoyosa train crash of 1977	August 2, 1977	Villajoyosa - El Campello (A)	3	58	Collision of two passenger trains.	
La cadena crossing accident	September 9, 1977	Valencia (V)	6	25	Collision of TALGO fast train from Portbou to Alicante with a FEVE narrow gauge commuter train.	
Utrera crossing accident of 1977	November 7, 1977	Utrera (SE)	5	0	A Talgo train crashed into a car at a crossing.	
Villanueva de Cañedo crossing accident of 1978	May 1, 1978	Villanueva de Cañedo, Topas (SA)	5	0	A passenger train crashed into a car at a crossing.	
Congostinas tunnel fire	September 26, 1978	Congostinas, Lena (AS)	7	0	A freight train of tank cars loaded with gasoline and diesel caught fire into the tunnel of Congostinas, in the León to Gijón railway.	
Cádiz accident of 1978	November 27, 1978	Cádiz (CA)	6	0	A railbus crashed into a car in a point of tracks where didn't exist railroad crossing.	
Manzanares train derailment	December 15, 1978	Manzanares (CR)	13	60	Two coaches of a Talgo express train derailed and crashed into a freight train after an erroneous track switch.	
Muñoz wayside station crossing accident	December 21, 1978	Muñoz, locality of La Fuente de San Esteban (SA)	32	56	A train crashed into a schoolbus at a crossing.	
Sollana train crash	January 18, 1979	Sollana (V)	5	28	Collision of an omnibus train travelling from Gandía to Valencia with a freight train.	
Mátola crossing accident	May 7, 1979	Mátola, Elche (A)	6	1	A train crashed into a car in a crossing.	
Cartagena crossing accident of 1979	November 20, 1979	Cartagena (MU)	5	1	A passenger train crashed into a car and a taxi at a crossing.	
Les Franqueses del Vallès train crash	December 6, 1979	Les Franqueses del Vallès (B)	18	49	An empty train careened down a steep incline and crashed into a passenger train.	

=== 1980–1989 ===
Accident	Date	Location	Killed	Injured	Description	Ref.
Vallada - Montesa train crash of 1980	June 20, 1980	Vallada - Montesa (V)	4	16	Collision of express trains Seville - Barcelona and Barcelona - Almería.	
Torralba del Moral train crash	July 15, 1980	Torralba del Moral, Medinaceli (SO)	17	22	An express train crashed into a standing freight train after a signal failure.	
Xirivella train crash	September 24, 1980	Xirivella, (V)	27	40	A train crashed into a bus at a crossing.	
Miraflores de la Sierra train crash	January 5, 1981	Miraflores de la Sierra (M)	7	20	Collision between a passenger train and a locomotive between Miraflores and Soto del Real.	
Segovia train crash	June 8, 1981	Torredondo - Valverde del Majano (SG)	6	0	A train crashed into a van at a crossing.	
Lérida crossing accident of 1981	July 10, 1981	Lérida/Lleida (LE/LL)	4	0	A train crashed into a car at a crossing.	
Vicién crossing accident of 1981	November 9, 1981	Vicién - Sangarrén (HU)	11	35	A railbus crashed into a truck at a crossing.	
Orejo train crash of 1982	May 5, 1982	Orejo, Marina de Cudeyo (CAN)	4	22	Collision of two passenger trains.	
Massalfassar crossing accident of 1983	May 29, 1983	Massalfassar (V)	5	0	Collision of a train with a car at a crossing.	
Pravia train crash of 1984	January 9, 1984	Pravia (AS)	3	80 (Approx.)	Collision of two passenger trains into a tunnel.	
Villajoyosa train crash of 1984	October 30, 1984	Villajoyosa (A)	9	28	Collision of two trains	
Ceceda derailment	November 15, 1987	Ceceda, Nava (AS)	4	10	Derailment of a passenger train, which fell into river Piloña.	
Valladolid train crash	March 3, 1988	Valladolid (VA)	8	30	Express train Costa verde from Madrid to Bilbao crashed into the rear of Madrid to Santander Cantabria express train, apparently due to faulty brakes of first train, when the last train was standing in Valladolid station.	
Juneda train accident	March 25, 1988	Juneda (LE/LL)	15	23	A passenger train crashed into a nursery bus at a non-guarded crossing.	
Infiesto derailment of 1988	August 3, 1988	Infiesto, Piloña (AS)	4	18	Derailment of a passenger train travelling from Santander to Oviedo.	
Arévalo train crash (1989)	September 6, 1989	Arévalo (AV)	5	44	A Talgo fast train travelling from Gijón to Madrid crashed into a standing freight train due to a wrong switch of tracks.	

=== 1990–1999 ===
Accident	Date	Location	Killed	Injured	Description	Ref.
Alcalá de Henares train accident of 1990	July 3, 1990	Alcalá de Henares - San Fernando de Henares (M)	6	8	A bar of steel fallen of a freight train crashed into an intercity train from Zaragoza to Madrid when both train crossing.	
Perlora accident of July 1992	July 26, 1992	Perlora, Carreño (AS)	3	0	A train ran over three teenagers that walked along the tracks into a tunnel.	
Vega de Anzo train crash	August 2, 1993	Vega de Anzo, Grado (AS)	12	7	Collision of a passenger train with a freight train in a tunnel.	
Os peares accident of October 1993	October 30, 1993	Os Peares (LU)	3	0	A train ran over three teenagers that walked along the tracks into a tunnel.	
Villanúa train crash of 1993	December 22, 1993	Villanúa (HU)	4	1	A freight train crashed into a maintenance railcar after first had a brake failure.	
Santa Fe de Mondújar crossing accident	November 7, 1994	Santa Fe de Mondújar, Gádor (AL)	7	0	A locomotive crashed into an ambulance at a crossing, killing all its travellers.	
Eibar train derailment	February 27, 1995	Eibar (GUI)	5	33	A train derailed near the Ego river.	
Las Correderas derailment of December 1995	December 25, 1995	Las Correderas, Santa Elena (J)	2	8	Derailment of express train from Barcelona to Málaga and Seville.	
Torrijos crossing accident of 1997	March 28, 1997	Torrijos (TO)	3	0	A train crashed into a car at a crossing.	
Uharte-Arakil train derailment	March 31, 1997	Uharte-Arakil (NA)	18	100	A passenger train derailed due to excessive speed.	
Azuqueca derailment of 1997	April 1, 1997	Azuqueca de Henares (GU)	2	22	Derailment of a Talgo express train from Barcelona to Málaga on a switcher.	
Vila-seca crossing accident of 1997	December 6, 1997	Vila-seca (T)	3	1	A train crashed into a car at a crossing.	
El Portal crossing accident of 1999	November 6, 1999	El Portal, Jerez de la Frontera (CA)	3	0	A train crashed into a car at a crossing.	

=== 2000–2009 ===
Accident	Date	Location	Killed	Injured	Description	Ref.
Barra de Miño crossing accident of 2000	August 27, 2000	Barra de Miño Station, Coles (OR/OU)	4	1	Train crashed into a car at a crossing.	
Carranza train crash of 2000	September 7, 2000	Carranza (BI)	4	0	Collision between two freight trains.	
Burgos crossing accident of 2000	November 14, 2000	Burgos (BU)	1	2	A container train crashed into a truck at a crossing. The train driver was killed. The assistant driver and the truck driver were seriously injured.	
Lorca train accident	January 3, 2001	Lorca (MU)	12	2	A train crashed into a van at a crossing.	
Torredembarra train crash of 2002	March 30, 2002	Torredembarra (T)	2	90	Collision of a Euromed train from Valencia to Barcelona with another passenger train of Catalonia regional net.	
Zaragoza crossing accident of 2002	November 4, 2002	Zaragoza (Z)	1	30	Passenger train crashed into a truck at a crossing.	
Tobarra derailment of 2003	January 4, 2003	Tobarra (AB)	2	38	Derailment of a Talgo express train from Madrid to Cartagena.	
Chinchilla train crash	June 3, 2003	Chinchilla de Monte-Aragón (AB)	19	38	Collision between a passenger train and a freight train.	
Torre Pacheco crossing accident of 2004	March 1, 2004	Torre Pacheco (MU)	4	0	Crash of a Talgo express train from Montpellier to Cartagena into a car at a crossing.	
2004 Madrid train bombings	March 11, 2004	Madrid (M)	193	2050	The 2004 Madrid train bombings, which killed 193 people, was an act of terrorism, not an accident.	
Petra derailment	March 13, 2004	Petra, Mallorca (IB)	0	10	Derailment of a passenger trains due to rocks and part of a wall fell on the tracks.	
Martín de Yeltes crossing accident of 2004	April 9, 2004	Martín de Yeltes (SA)	6	2	A locomotive crashed into a car in a crossing.	
Hellín crossing accident of 2004	May 7, 2004	Hellín (AB)	5	0	Crash of a Talgo express train from Madrid to Cartagena into a car at a crossing.	
Alicante crossing accident of 2005	December 5, 2005	San Gabriel – Torrellano, Alicante (A)	4	0	Crash of a commuter train from Alicante to Murcia into a car at a crossing.	
Puerta del Ángel Metromadrid station train crash (2006)	April 10, 2006	Madrid (M)	2	2	Collision of two maintenance vehicles of Underground of Madrid.	
Valencia Metro derailment	July 3, 2006	Valencia (V)	43	47	Derailment of two coaches of a unit of metro of Valencia at a curve due to excessive speed.	
Villada derailment	August 21, 2006	Villada (P)	7	36	Derailment of intercity train Vigo/A Coruña - Irún on a switch due excessive speed.	
Valga crossing accident of April 2007	April 25, 2007	Valga (PO)	3	0	Crash of a train into a car in a level crossing.	
Dueñas rail accident of September 2008	September 1, 2008	Dueñas, (P)	1	1	A locomotive crashed into an excavation machine that made works on the tracks.	
Lezama station crash of 2009	October 8, 2009	Lezama (BI)	1	3	Crash of a passenger train with a concrete wall located at the end of the tracks.	

=== 2010–2019 ===
Accident	Date	Location	Killed	Injured	Description	Ref.
Arevalo train crash (2010)	March 26, 2010	Arévalo (AV)	1	0	Collision of two freight trains.	
Silla containers station train crash of 2010	April 8, 2010	Silla (V)	1	0	Crash of a train in manoeuvres into a string of containers cars.	
Sineu derailment	May 19, 2010	Sineu, Mallorca (IB)	0	28	Collision of a passenger train with a wall fell on the tracks and derailment.	
Castelldefels train accident	June 23, 2010	Castelldefels (B)	12	14	Alaris fast train from Valencia to Barcelona ran over a group of people who were crossing the tracks.	
Carmonita crossing accident of 2010	September 6, 2010	Carmonita (BA)	2	10	Crash of a passenger train into a heavy truck at a crossing.	
Mataró train accident	February 19, 2012	Mataró (B)	0	10	A commuter train crashed into a platform.	
Loranca Metrosur works crash	August 7, 2012	Madrid (M)	2	2	Crash of a train into a wall located at the end of the tracks happened in Metrosur Underground of Madrid system works near Loranca, Fuenlabrada.	
Santiago de Compostela derailment	July 24, 2013	Angrois, Santiago de Compostela (C)	79	140	High-speed train derailed when entering curve at excessive speed.	
2016 O Porriño derailment	September 9, 2016	O Porriño (PO)	4	49	A train derailed at entrance of O Porriño Station when passed over a switcher with excessive speed (118 km/h when the speed limit was 30 km/h.	
2018 Fontanar crossing accident	May 27, 2018	Fontanar (GU)	3	0	A train ran over a car in a level crossing.	
2018 Vacarisses derailment	November 20, 2018	Vacarisses (B)	1	49	Derailment of a commuter train from Manresa to Barcelona when it crashed into a rockslide.	
2019 Sant Vicenç de Castellet crash	February 8, 2019	Sant Vicenç de Castellet (B)	1	100	Crash of two commuter trains of Barcelona suburban net between stations of Manresa and Sant Vicenç de Castellet.	

=== 2020–current ===
Accident	Date	Location	Killed	Injured	Description	Ref.
2020 La Hiniesta accident	June 2, 2020	La Hiniesta (ZA)	2	6	Collision of a train with an off-road vehicle that fell from an overpass onto the tracks	
2021 Novelda level crossing accident	July 2, 2021	Novelda (A)	4	0	Car - train collision	
2022 Barcelona crossing accident	May 16, 2022	Barcelona (B)	1	80	Train - train collision	
2022 Montcada i Reixac rail crash	December 7, 2022	Montcada i Reixac (B)	0	155	Train - train collision	
2026 Adamuz train derailments	January 18, 2026	Adamuz (CO)	46	152+	Derailment, with rollover causing a train - train collision on the opposite tracks	
2026 Gelida train derailment	January 20, 2026	Gelida (B)	1	37+	A train collided with a fallen support wall, injuring at least 37 and killing the driver	
2026 Cartagena train accident	January 22, 2026	Cartagena (MU)	0	6	A passenger train collided with a crane arm	
2026 Talavera la Real train accident	February 12, 2026	Talavera (TO)	1	0	A passenger train collided with a car at a level crossing	
2026 Toledo train collision	October 28, 2026	Urda (TO)	69+	179+	An AVE passenger train hit an Iryo train from behind, causing two Iryo cars to derail	

== See also ==
- List of rail accidents by country
