= Pobladura =

Pobladura may refer to:

- Pobladura de Pelayo García, a municipality in the Spanish province of León
- Pobladura de Valderaduey, a municipality in the Spanish province of Zamora
- Pobladura del Valle, a municipality in the Spanish province of Zamora
