= Provincial Museum of Ciudad Real =

- Museo Provincial de Ciudad Real
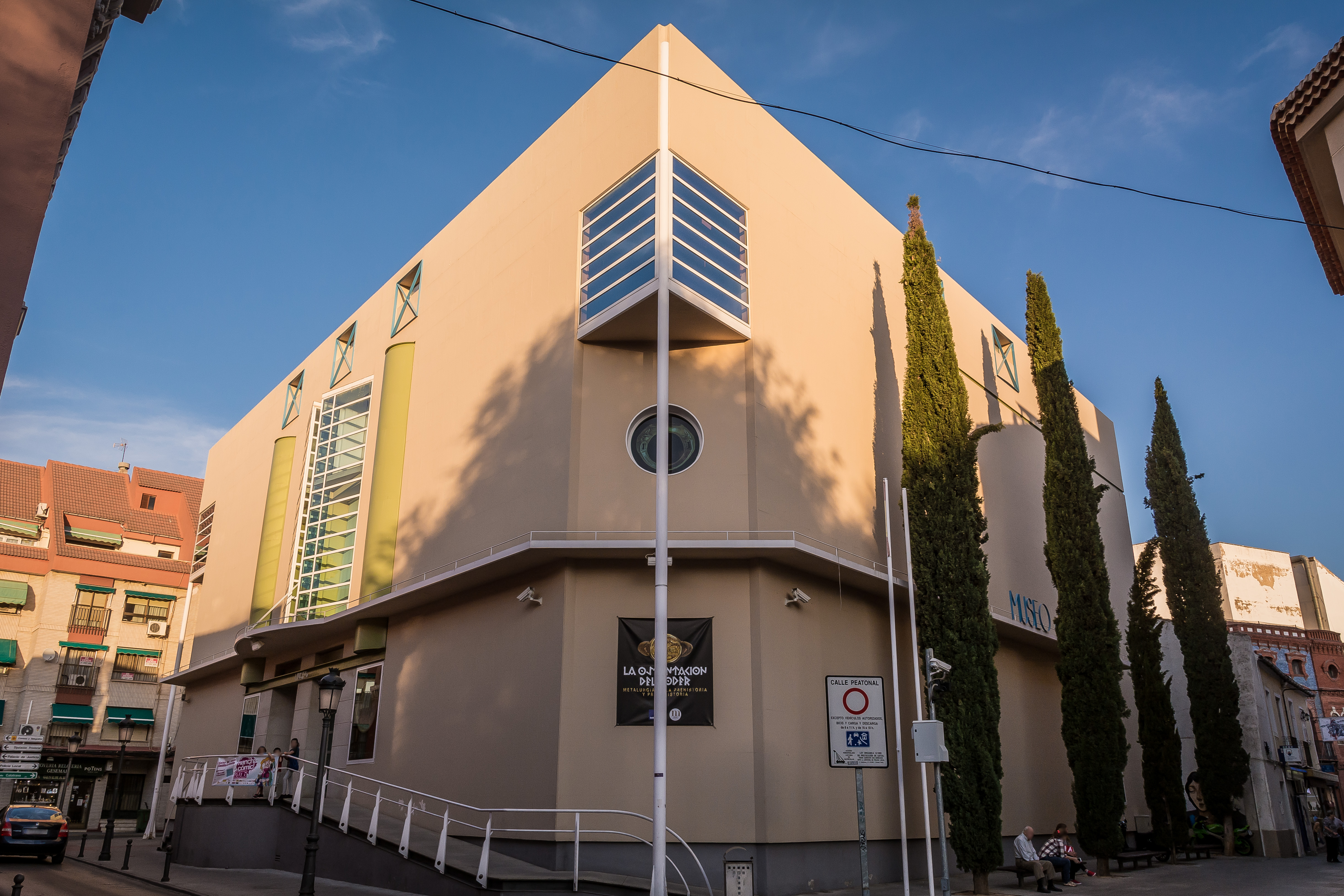
- Established: 15 March 1982
- Location: Ciudad Real, Spain
- Coordinates: 38°59′10″N 3°55′45″W
- Type: Archaeology, paleontology museum

The Provincial Museum of Ciudad Real (Spanish: Museo Provincial de Ciudad Real) is a paleontology and archaeology museum in Ciudad Real, Spain. It is jointly operated with the fine arts museum housed in the Convent of La Merced.

== History ==
The project was awarded to the architect Carlos Luca de Tena, while building works took place from 1976 to 1978. It was opened to public on 15 March 1982. After reform works between 1993 and 1995, the museum was reopened on 29 March 1995. New reform works started in 2007 and the section of Fine Arts was relocated to the Convent of La Merced. The museum was thus reopened again on 27 September 2013.

== Collection ==
The archaeological section exhibits an important set of Paleolithic items, chiefly coming from private collections. The Chalcolithic and Bronze Age feature bell beaker pottery and stone arrowheads. The items from the later period also include Bronze Age warrior stelae discovered in the province of Ciudad Real, as recently as that found in Chillón in 2018.

A reconstruction of an Anancus skeleton found in Las Higueruelas constitutes the landmark item of the museum.

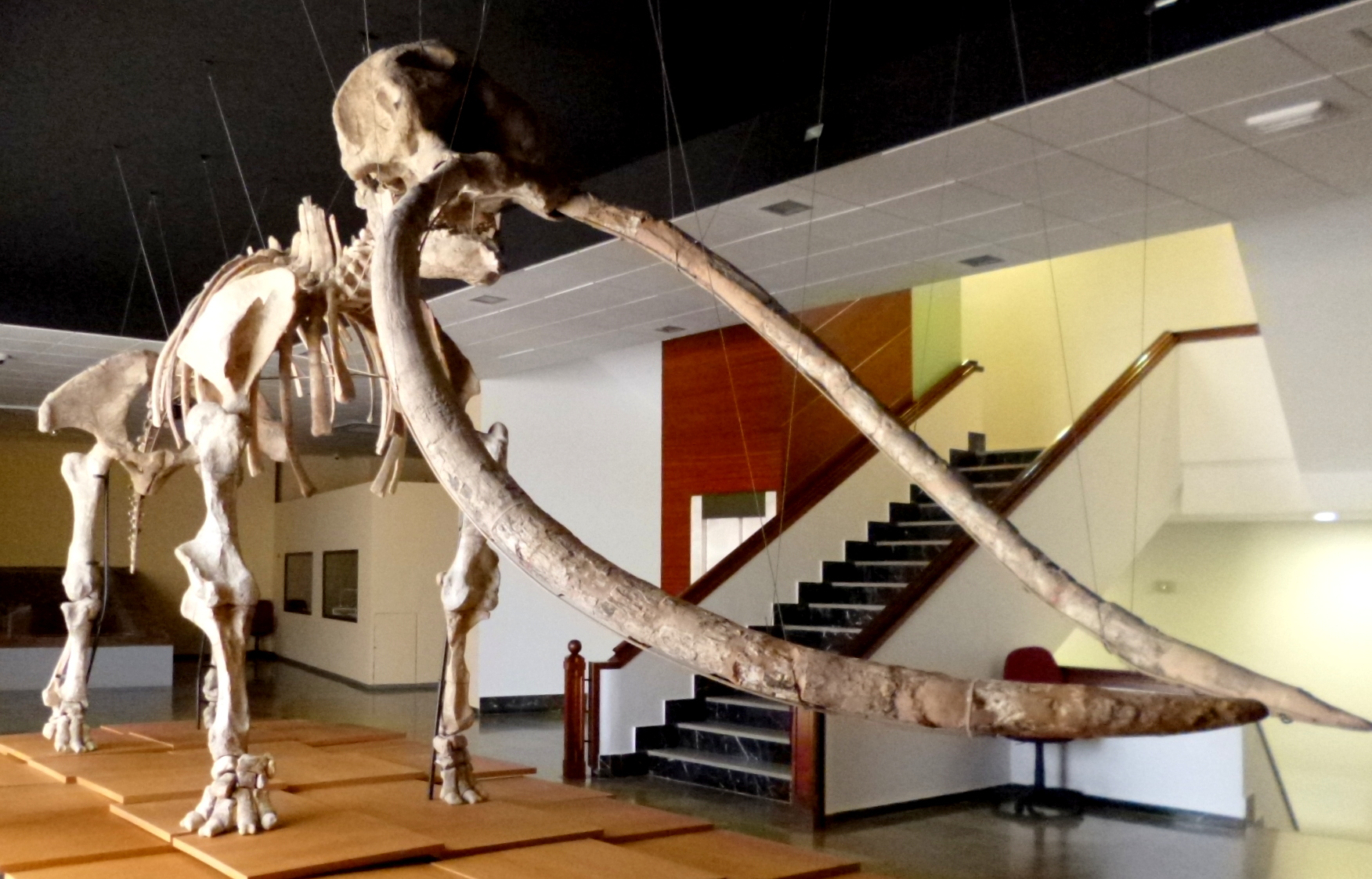
Reconstruction of the Anancus arvernensis skeleton found in Las Higueruelas

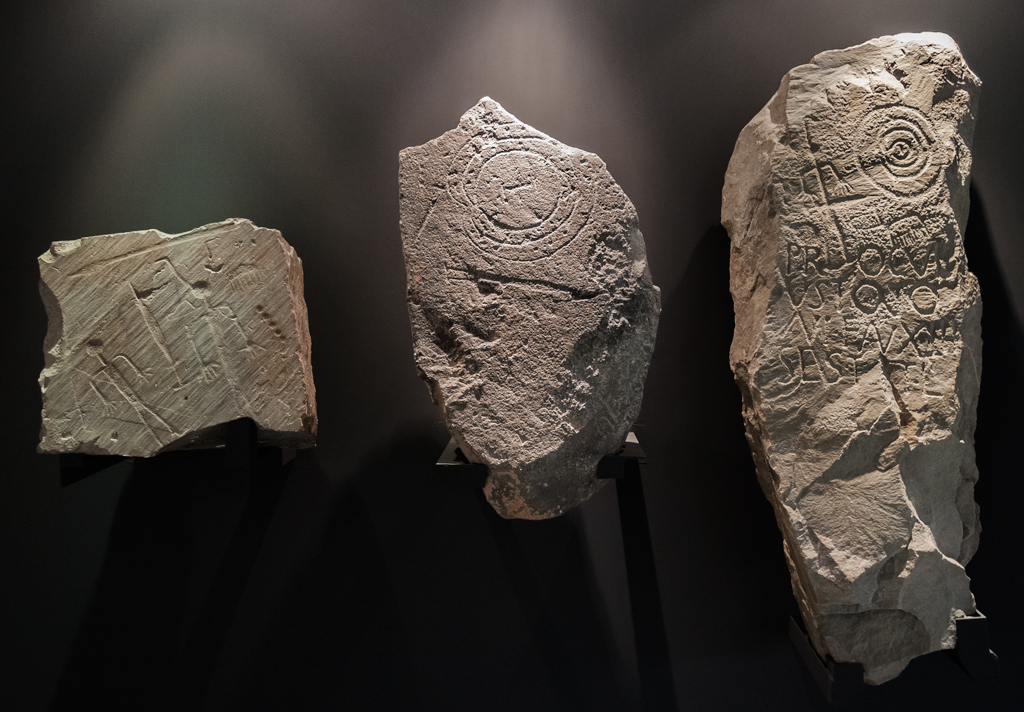
Group of Bronze Age warrior stelae from Alamillo and Chillón

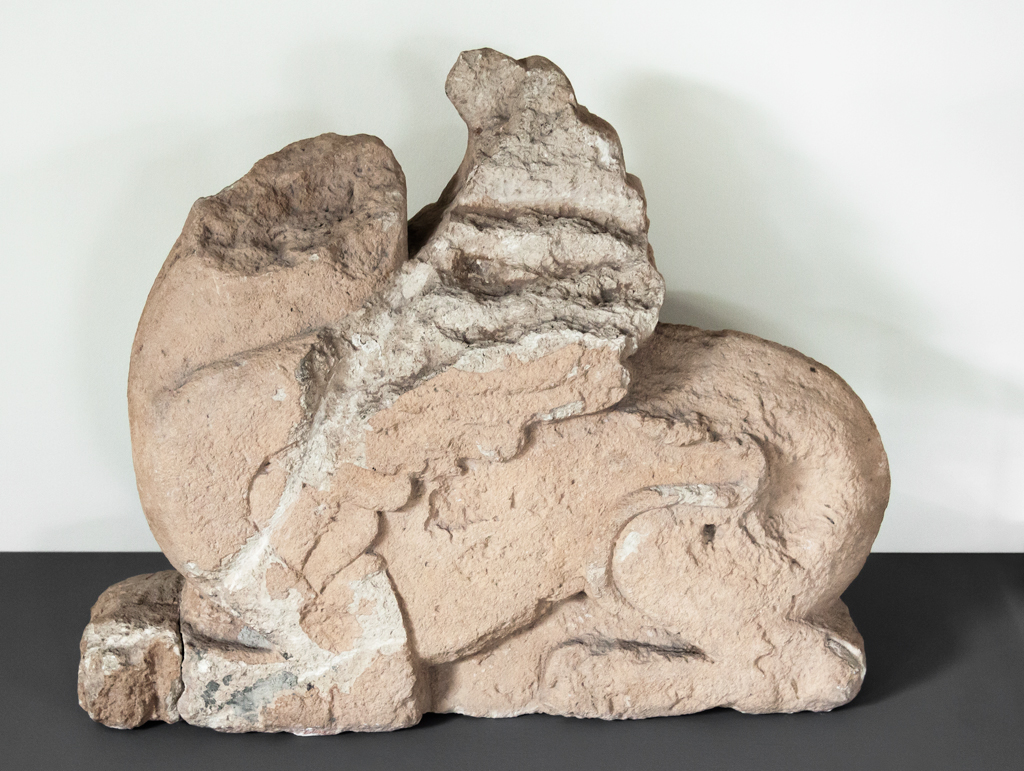
Iberian sphinx found in Alarcos

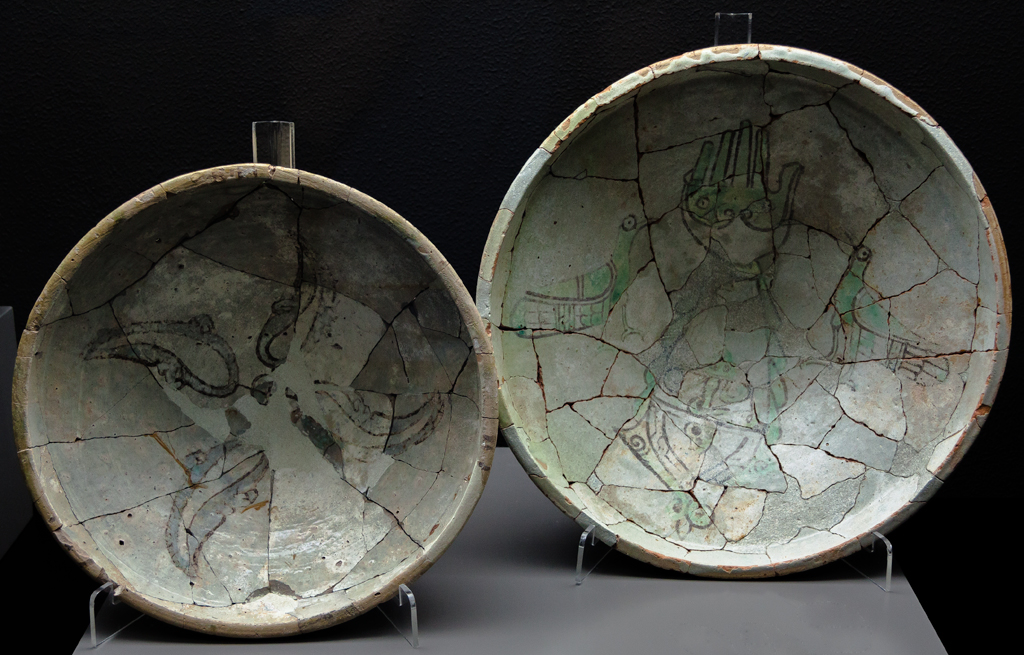
Almohad clay bowls (ataifores) found in the castle of Alarcos
