= Alcudia bridge disaster =

1884 railway incident in Spain

Details
- Date: 27 April 1884; 04:00 AM (local time)
- Location: Bridge over Alcudia river, Alamillo, province of Ciudad Real
- Coordinates: 38°43′13″N 4°50′33″W
- Country: Spain
- Line: Madrid–Ciudad Real–Badajoz
- Operator: MZA
- Incident type: Locomotive derailment
- Cause: Inconclusive

Statistics
- Deaths: 59
- Injured: 56

The Alcudia bridge disaster (Spanish: Catástrofe del Puente de Alcudia) was a train incident in the province of Ciudad Real, Spain, on 27 April 1884. With 59 reported deaths, it became by far the largest train disaster in the country up to that date.

== History ==
The bridge, inaugurated in 1864, is located at kilometre point 279 of the Madrid–Ciudad Real–Badajoz railway line, between the stations of Chillón and Almadenejos. The line was owned by the Compañía de los Ferrocarriles de Madrid a Zaragoza y Alicante (MZA).

The events took place in the early morning of 27 April 1884, at about 04:00 AM, when a locomotive (along several carriages and cages with sheep) derailed off the bridge. The flow of the river was very high compared to its usual modest flow due to rain fallen in previous days.

The disaster brought 59 deaths, 54 of them soldiers of the infantry regiment Castilla and 3 soldiers of the infantry regiment Granada, as well as two civilians. There was 56 injured, who were moved to the hospital of Almadén (those critically injured) and Almadenejos.

The incident report was jointly drafted by engineers employed by the Spanish State and MZA. The experts reported one of the three pillars of the bridge had been cut down, prompting the contemporary press to talk about an alleged premeditated sabotage.

The train drivers were indicted of homicide and injuries, and the trial started in 1885. The sentence cleared both the workers and MZA.
