= Alabern bridge disaster =

Rail accident that occurred in 1863 in Spain

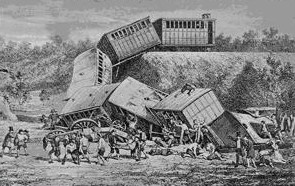
- Contemporary press drawing of the accident

Details
- Date: 7 October 1863 (Evening)
- Location: Near Hostalric, Province of Girona, Spain
- Operator: Empresa de los Caminos de Hierro de Barcelona a Gerona
- Incident type: Derailment
- Cause: Bridge collapse during flooding

Statistics
- Passengers: 85
- Deaths: 21
- Injured: 11 serious; many more minor

The Alabern bridge disaster, also known as the Hostalric rail accident, was a bridge collapse that occurred on the evening of 7 October 1863 near Hostalric, in the Province of Girona, Spain. A steam locomotive, tender and 10 carriages that travelled from Girona to Barcelona, crashed as the Pont del Torrent de Cal Abert bridge collapsed after it was weakened by torrential rain. 21 people were killed and 11 others seriously injured.

It was at the time the deadliest rail accident in Spain, until the Alcudia bridge disaster in 1884.

After the accident it became clear that wooden bridges are sensitive to bad weather. The bridge was rebuilt with a steel structure.

== Background ==
On 7 October 1863, severe thunderstorms struck across Catalonia, causing many rivers to overflow and inflict heavy damage. That afternoon, express train no.24 of the Empresa de los Caminos de Hierro de Barcelona a Gerona line departed Girona. It consisted of a steam locomotive, tender and 10 passenger cars. There were 85 passengers on board, travelling to Barcelona via Granollers. A first section of this railway line had opened in 1854, with the complete line entering service on 12 June 1862.

Between the stations of Hostalric and Breda, the line crossed the Cal Abert stream, (Note: In various publications the stream is also referred to as "Aladern", "Alebern", "Albern" or "Abern".) which rises on the Torre de la Mora mountain in the municipality of Gaserans and flows into the Tordera. The bridge lay roughly halfway between the two stations. It was a wooden construction with a span of about 5 metres (16 ft) and roughly the same height. It had already collapsed once before, in October 1861, after heavy rainfall, though no further damage occurred at that time.

== Accident ==
After leaving Hostalric station and crossing the Arbúcies river bridge, heavy rain intensified. Visibility was very poor, so the train proceeded slowly. A track watchman, stationed 400 metres (1,300 ft) before the what was to be the accident site, stopped the train with a danger signal and warned the driver that the downpour might have damaged the track bed. The driver continued very cautiously at only about 10 kilometres per hour (6.2 mph). When the train attempted to cross the Pont del Torrent de Cal Abert, the stream became torrential, with the water level rising to more than 3 metres (9.8 ft). The combined pressure of the floodwaters and the locomotive’s weight caused the wooden structure to collapse. The locomotive, tender and eight carriages fell into the stream and were swept away by the current. The train cars sank immediately.

== Aftermath and legacy ==
Twenty-one people were killed in the accident, 19 at the scene and two later of their injuries. Eleven more were seriously injured, and many others sustained lighter wounds. The driver and fireman were thrown clear of the engine and reached the riverbank unhurt. First aid was provided by a military doctor, along with the local doctor, pharmacist and nearby farmers. As night had fallen, the rescue work was carried out by torchlight. The seriously injured were taken to Hostalric’s small hospital.

The collapsed wooden bridge was later replaced with a steel structure, which then served as the railway bridge for over a century.

In 2023, 150 years after the disaster, the disaster was still being commemorated.
