= Torre del Bierzo rail disaster =

Train wreck

Coordinates: 42°35′24″N 6°21′59″W

Details
- Date: 3 January 1944; 13:20 CET (UTC+01:00)
- Location: Torre del Bierzo, Spain
- Line: Madrid to A Coruña
- Operator: RENFE
- Incident type: Collision in tunnel
- Cause: Brake failure

Statistics
- Trains: 3
- Deaths: 78 (official); 100 (most recent estimate)

The Torre del Bierzo rail disaster occurred on 3 January 1944 near the village of Torre del Bierzo in the El Bierzo region of Spain's León province when three trains collided and caught fire inside a tunnel. Although the official death toll was 78, and at the time it was estimated to be 200–250, the most recent study has estimated it at no more than 100.

== Overview ==
At 20:30 the previous evening the Galicia passenger express, consisting of 12 carriages hauled by two 4-8-0 ‘Mastodon’ steam locomotives, left Madrid bound for A Coruña. It was running two hours late when it arrived at Astorga and was having problems with its brakes; nine minutes were spent at Astorga checking them. Later, one of the locomotives was removed due to a hot axle box. The train was now three hours late, and despite serious problems with its brakes during the steep descent through Branuelas, the decision was made to continue. The train was scheduled to stop at Albares but failed to do so, despite all hand-brakes on the carriages and sand being applied. The Albares station master immediately telephoned Torre del Bierzo to say that the train had lost its brakes on the steep descent. At Torre del Bierzo the station master ran for his office and attempts were made to put sleepers on the line to slow the runaway train, but these efforts were to no avail and the train ran through with its whistle blowing and its brake shoes applied, heading for tunnel No. 20, located just beyond the station.

Meanwhile, a shunting engine and three carriages were travelling through the tunnel away from the station having been warned by the station master about the runaway passenger train. The last two carriages were still in the tunnel when they were struck by the passenger train, its first six carriages beginning to burn, their wood construction being ignited by the train's gas lighting.

Unaware of the first collision, a coal train was approaching the tunnel from the opposite direction with 27 loaded wagons. As the crash had destroyed the signaling cables, the signals were set at clear when the coal train left tunnel No. 21. The unharmed driver of the shunting engine desperately tried to warn the oncoming coal train which managed to slow, but it still ploughed into the shunting locomotive's train, killing the shunting engine driver and four railwaymen on the coal train.

The fire burned for two days, delaying any rescue effort and making the identification of most of the victims impossible.

Strict censorship under the regime of General Franco in the wake of the Spanish Civil War meant that the accident received little publicity at the time, and the official RENFE file on the disaster was lost. Many people travelled without tickets so it was difficult to estimate the true number of passengers aboard, but survivors stated that the train was full, many travelling to the Christmas fair in Bembibre. It was only many years later that the scale of the accident was revealed; the actual death toll remains disputed. A recent and very detailed book on the disaster amounts the death toll to no more than 100.

Tunnel No. 20, the scene of the accident, was closed in 1985 due to geological problems.

A film about the accident entitled Tunnel number 20 won a Goya Award in 2002 for best short documentary film.

In 2019, the Spanish TV station RTVE produced a documentary called "El tren de los desaparecidos" ("The Train of the Disappeared"), with witnesses and relatives of the victims. The Guinness Book of Rail Facts and Feats, published in 1971 by John Marshall, claims it is the third worst railway disaster with 500-800 killed. Studies indicate that neither documentation nor estimates are correct, and historian Vicente Fernandez indicates 101 mortal victims and 116 wounded. Also in the documentary, it is stated the train designated as RENFE 151-3101 located at the Catalonia Museum is actually the "Santa-Fe" Norte 5100 that was the locomotive involved in the train wreck.

== Bibliography ==
- (In Spanish) Vicente Fernandez Vazquez: La verdad sobre el accidente ferroviario de Torre del Bierzo (1944), Ponferrada 2019, ISBN 978-84-15535-49-2

== See also ==
- Saint-Michel-de-Maurienne derailment, another very serious railway accident caused by inadequate brake power on a steep gradient.
- List of Spanish rail accidents
- List of train accidents by death toll

== Sources (in Spanish) ==
- El accidente de Torre del Bierzo www.astorga.com
- ¿Qué pasó en el túnel número 20? www.elmundo.es
- Las victimas fueron 100 www.elbierzodigital.com
