= Pobladura de Valderaduey =

Coordinates: 41°42′N 5°32′W

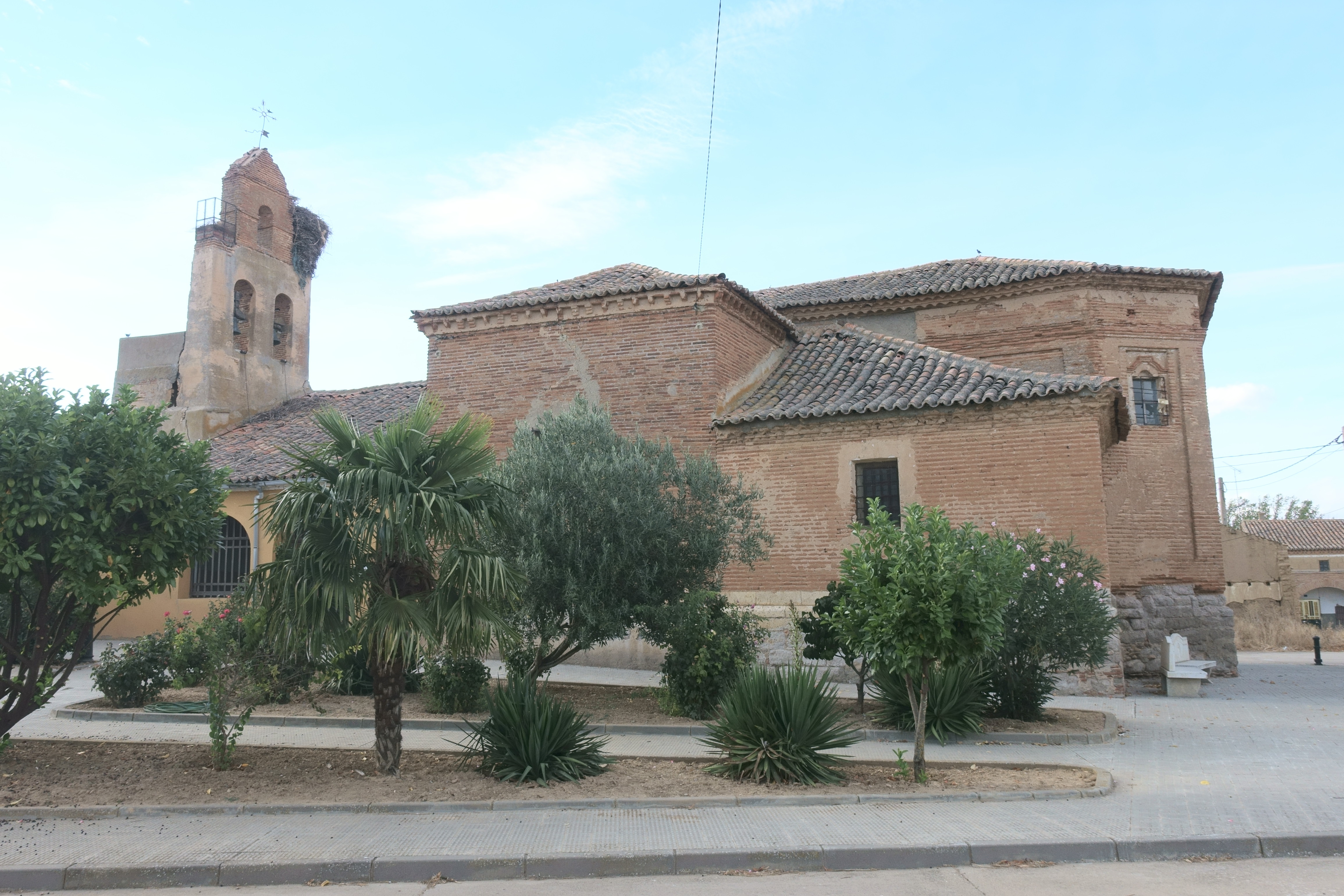
- Interactive map of Pobladura de Valderaduey
- Country: Spain
- Autonomous community: Castile and León
- Province: Zamora
- Municipality: Pobladura de Valderaduey

Area
  - Total: 12.54 km^{2} (4.84 sq mi)
- Elevation: 665 m (2,182 ft)

Population (2025-01-01)
  - Total: 34
  - Density: 2.7/km^{2} (7.0/sq mi)
- Time zone: UTC+1 (CET)
  - Summer (DST): UTC+2 (CEST)

Pobladura de Valderaduey is a municipality located in the province of Zamora, Castile and León, Spain. According to the 2004 census (INE), the municipality had a population of 66 inhabitants.
