= Villafranca del Campo =

- municipality
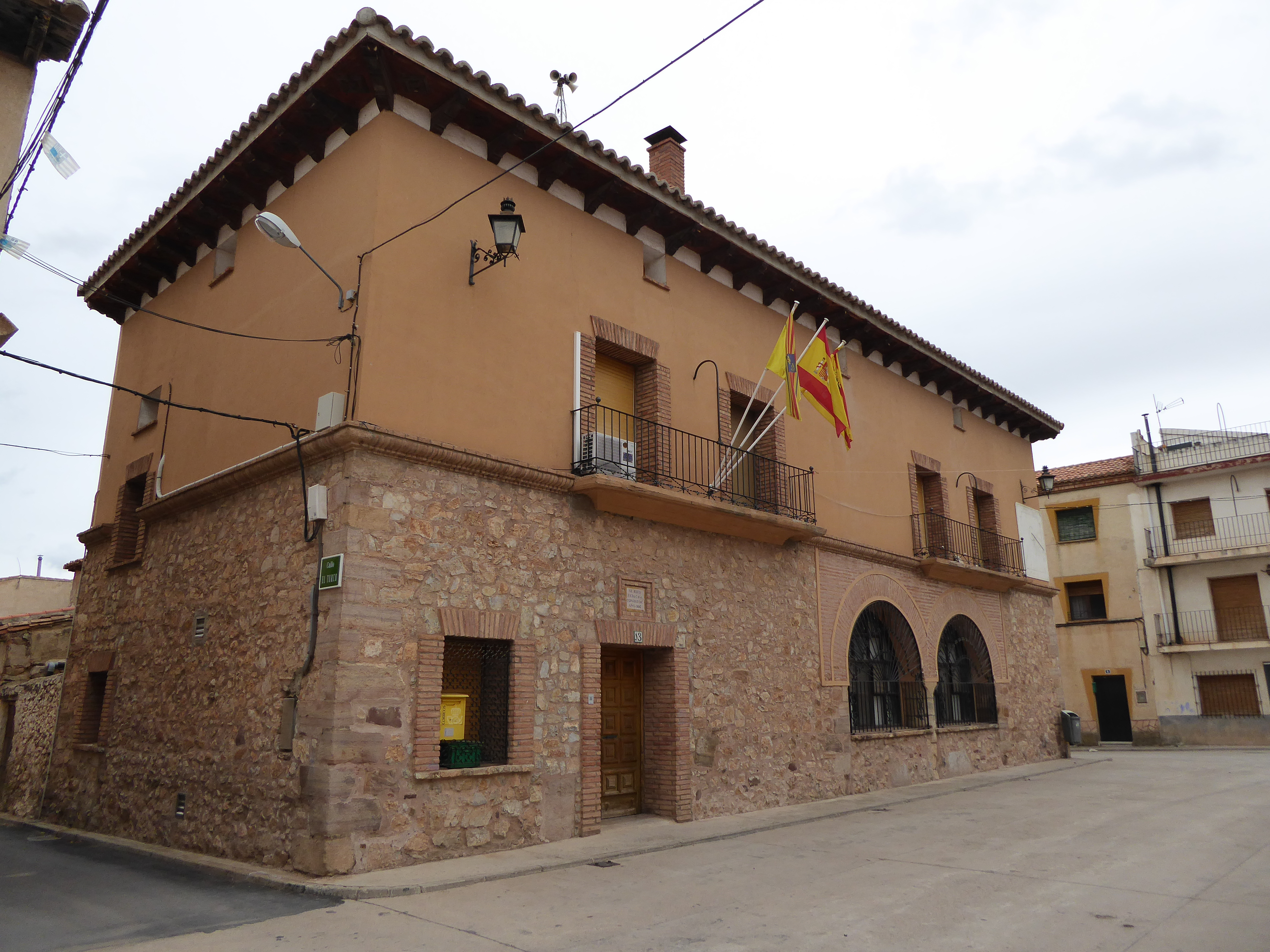
- Town hall

- Flag Coat of arms

- Location within Spain
- Coordinates: 40°42′N 1°21′W
- Country: Spain
- Autonomous community: Aragon
- Province: Teruel
- Comarca: Jiloca

Area
  - Total: 66 km^{2} (25 sq mi)
- Elevation: 956 m (3,136 ft)

Population (2025-01-01)
  - Total: 290
  - Density: 4.4/km^{2} (11/sq mi)
- Time zone: UTC+1 (CET)
  - Summer (DST): UTC+2 (CEST)

Villafranca del Campo is a municipality located in the province of Teruel, Aragon, Spain. According to the 2004 census (INE), the municipality has a population of 368 inhabitants.

== See also ==
- List of municipalities in Teruel
