= Torre del Bierzo =

Coordinates: 42°35′41″N 6°19′33″W

- municipality
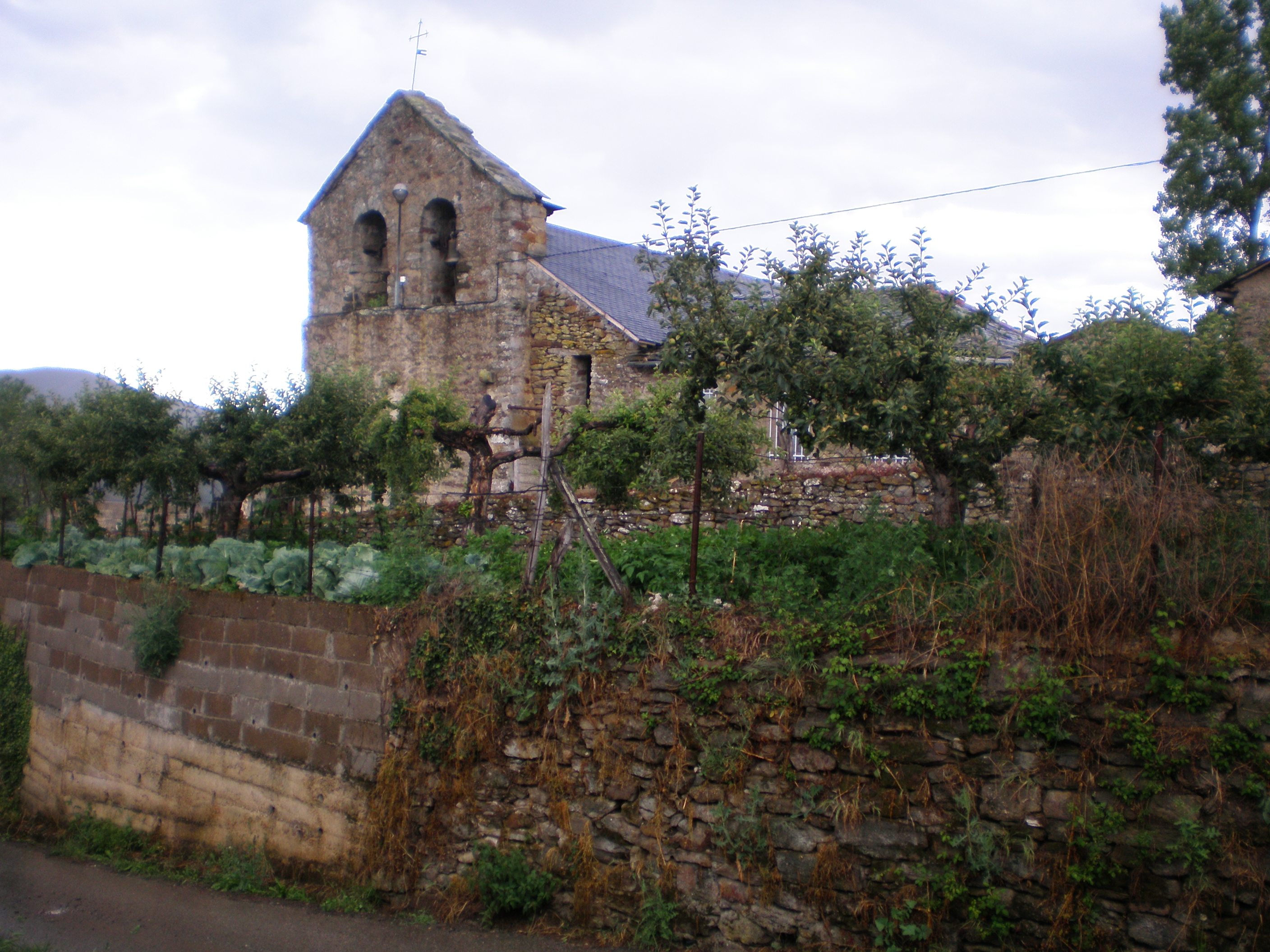

- Coat of arms
- Interactive map of Torre del Bierzo
- Country: Spain
- Autonomous community: Castile and León
- Province: León
- Municipality: Torre del Bierzo

Area
  - Total: 119 km^{2} (46 sq mi)

Population (2025-01-01)
  - Total: 1,929
  - Density: 16.2/km^{2} (42.0/sq mi)
- Time zone: UTC+1 (CET)
  - Summer (DST): UTC+2 (CEST)
- Climate: Csb

Torre del Bierzo (Leonese: Torre de Santa Marina) is a village and municipality in the region of El Bierzo (province of León, Castile and León, Spain). According to the 2004 census (INE), the municipality has a population of 2,736 inhabitants.

In 1944 it was the site of a train disaster in which it is believed between 200 and 800 people died when three trains collided in a tunnel.

The main historical landmark of the village is a Roman bridge over Tremor river built in the first century. It was part of the Via Nova or Via XVII, one of the main routes connecting the actual cities of Braga (Portugal) and Astorga (Spain)
