= Almadenejos =

- Almadenejos
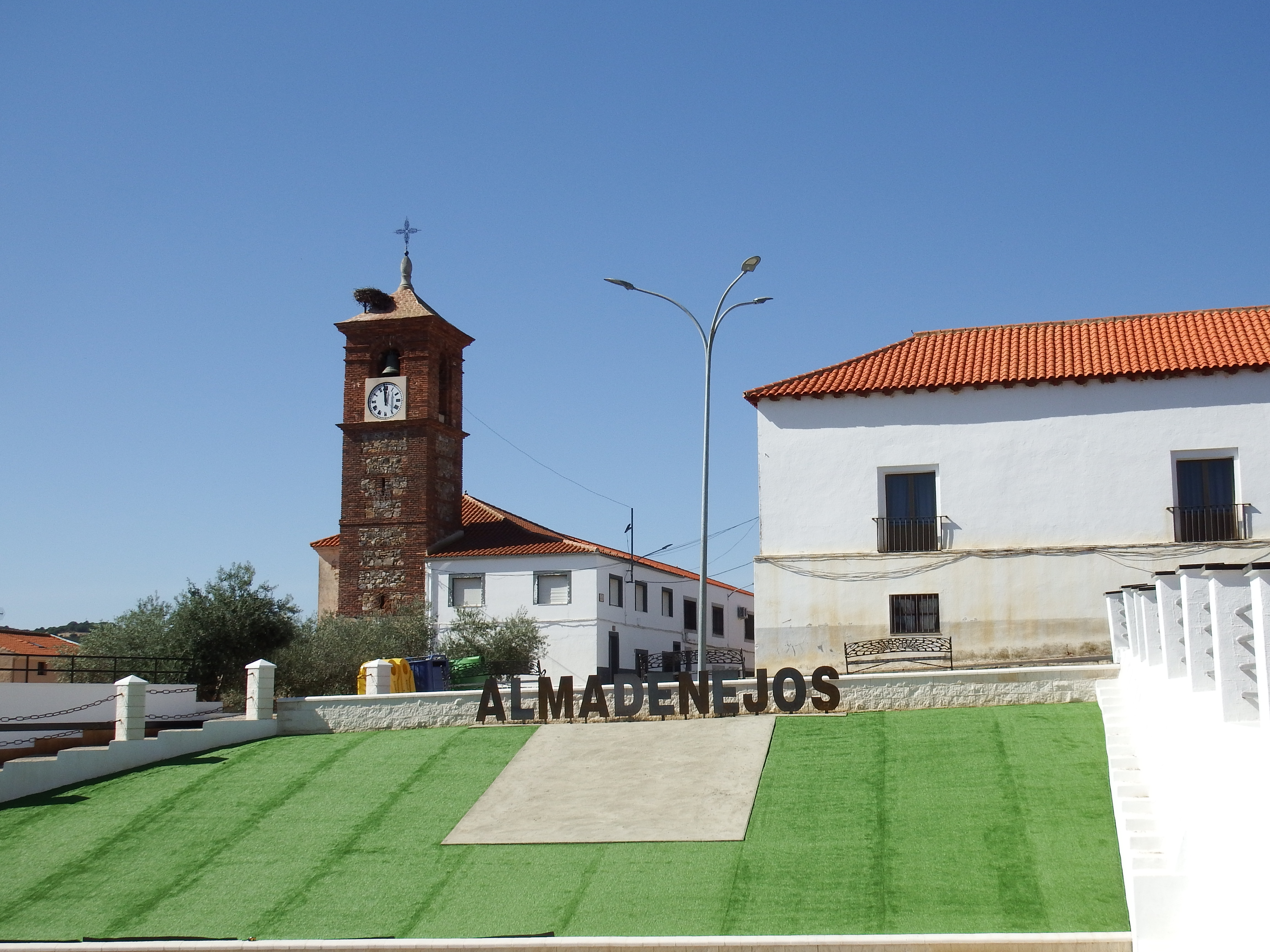

- Coat of arms

- Location in Spain.
- Coordinates: 38°40′N 4°17′W
- Country: Spain
- Autonomous community: Castile-La Mancha
- Province: Ciudad Real
- Comarca: Valle de Alcudia

Government
  - Mayor: Pedro Solana López

Area
  - Total: 102.88 km^{2} (39.72 sq mi)
- Elevation: 520 m (1,710 ft)

Population (2025-01-01)
  - Total: 384
  - Density: 3.73/km^{2} (9.67/sq mi)
- Demonym: Almadenejenses
- Postal code: 13480
- Website: Official website

Almadenejos is a municipality in the province of Ciudad Real, Castile-La Mancha, Spain. It has a population of 481.
