= Alamillo =

Spanish municipality

Coordinates: 38°41′N 4°47′W

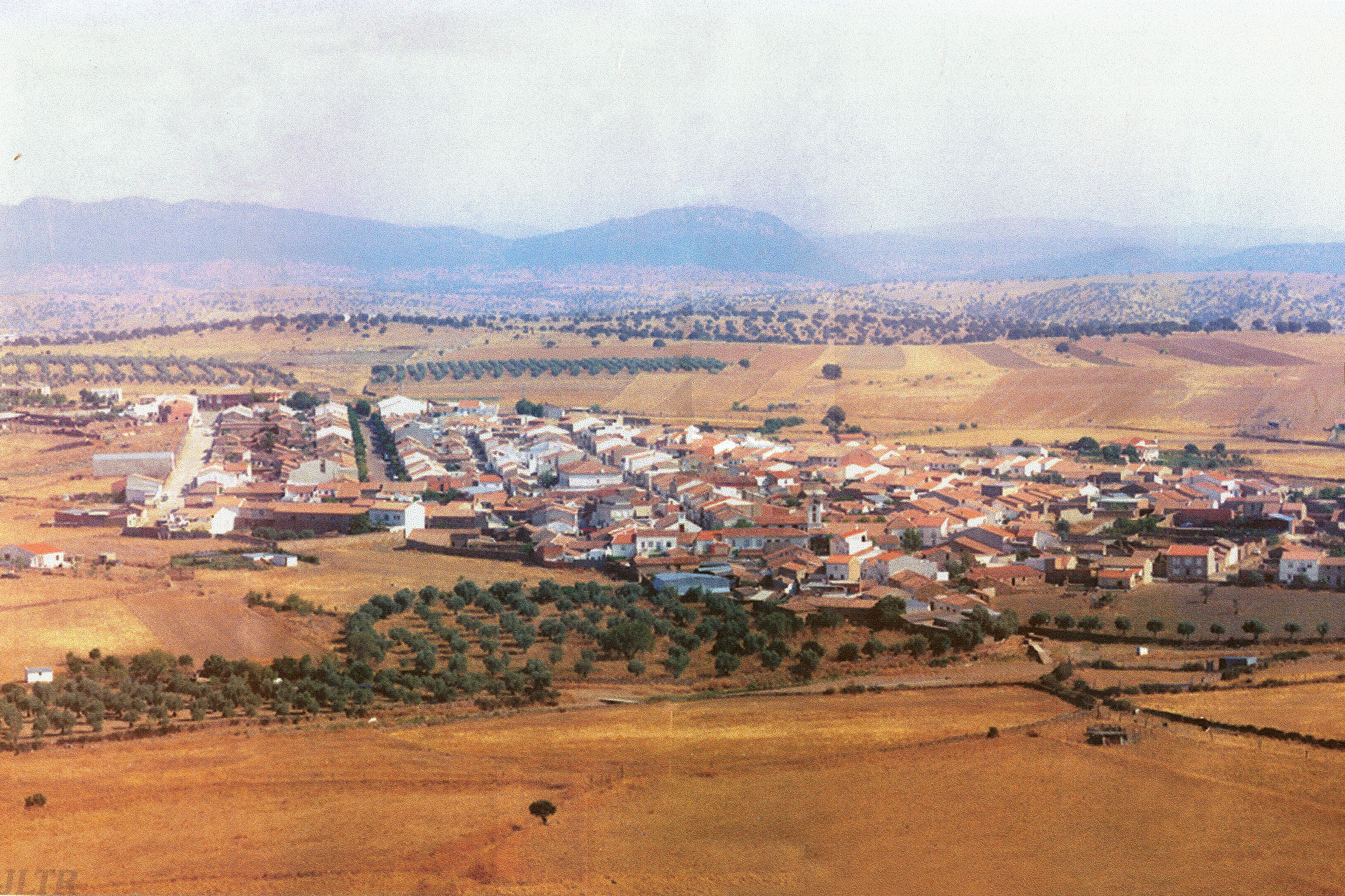
View of Alamillo

Coat of arms of Alamillo

Alamillo is a municipality in Ciudad Real, Castile-La Mancha, Spain. It has a population of 674.
