= Pobladura del Valle =

Coordinates: 42°06′N 5°44′W

Pobladura del Valle, Spain
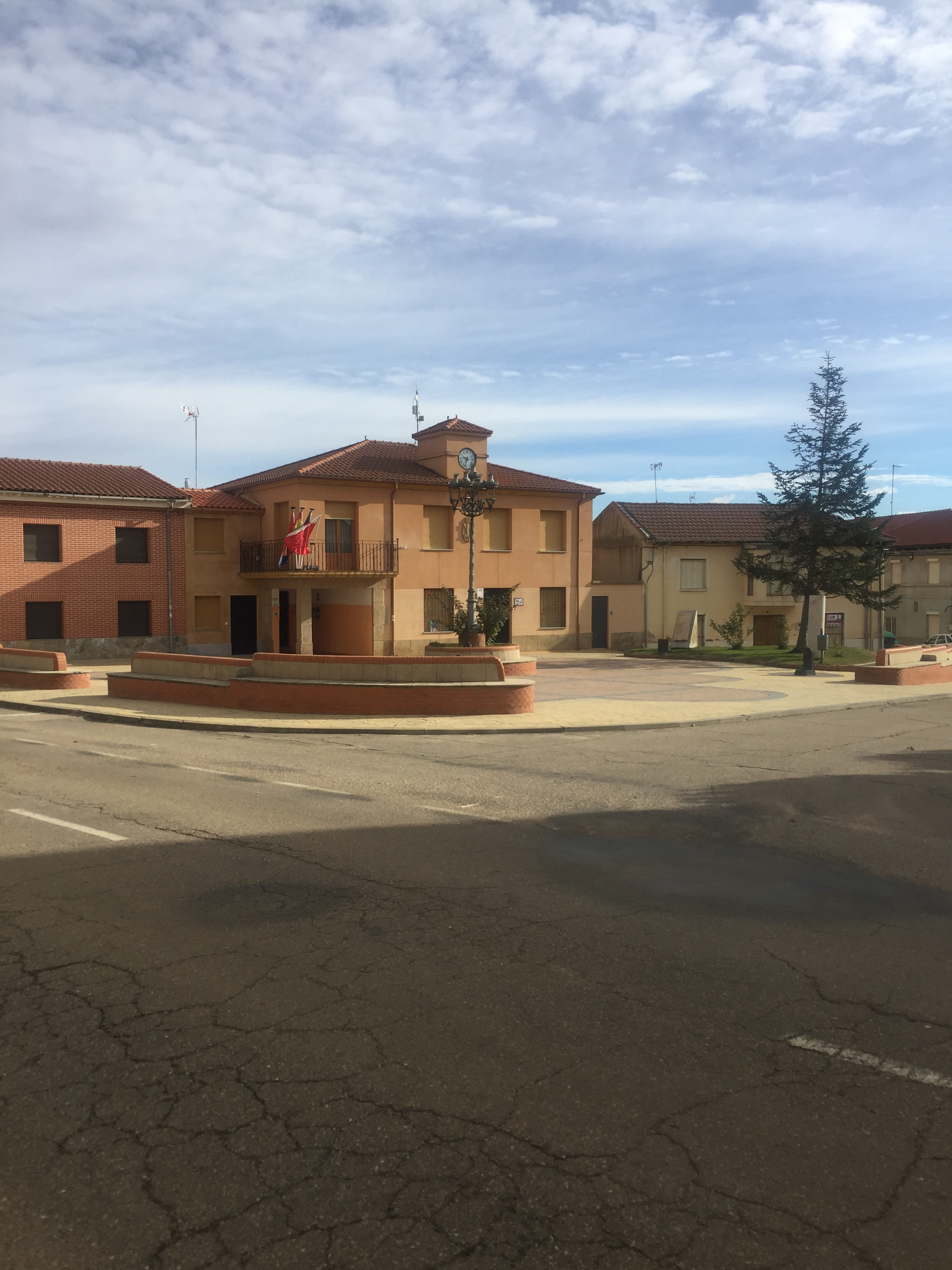
- Pobladura del Valle

- Flag Coat of arms
- Interactive map of Pobladura del Valle, Spain
- Country: Spain
- Autonomous community: Castile and León
- Province: Zamora
- Municipality: Pobladura del Valle

Area
  - Total: 14 km^{2} (5.4 sq mi)

Population (2025-01-01)
  - Total: 269
  - Density: 19/km^{2} (50/sq mi)
- Time zone: UTC+1 (CET)
  - Summer (DST): UTC+2 (CEST)
- Website: Official website

Pobladura del Valle is a municipality located in the province of Zamora, Castile and León, Spain. According to the 2004 census (INE), the municipality has a population of 338 inhabitants.
