= Chillón =

- Municipality
- Coat of arms

- Location in Spain
- Coordinates: 38°47′49″N 4°52′01″W
- Country: Spain
- Autonomous community: Castile-La Mancha
- Province: Ciudad Real

Area
  - Total: 207.78 km^{2} (80.22 sq mi)
- Elevation: 515 m (1,690 ft)

Population (2025-01-01)
  - Total: 1,752
  - Density: 8.432/km^{2} (21.84/sq mi)
- Demonym(s): Chillonero, Chillonera
- Time zone: UTC+1 (CET)
  - Summer (DST): UTC+2 (CEST)
- Postal code: 13412
- Official language(s): Spanish
- Website: Official website

Chillón is a municipality in Ciudad Real, Castile-La Mancha, Spain. It has a population of 2,271.
