= Antonio Ángel Algora Hernando =

Spanish prelate (1940–2020)

The Most Reverend Antonio Ángel Algora
- Bishop of Ciudad Real
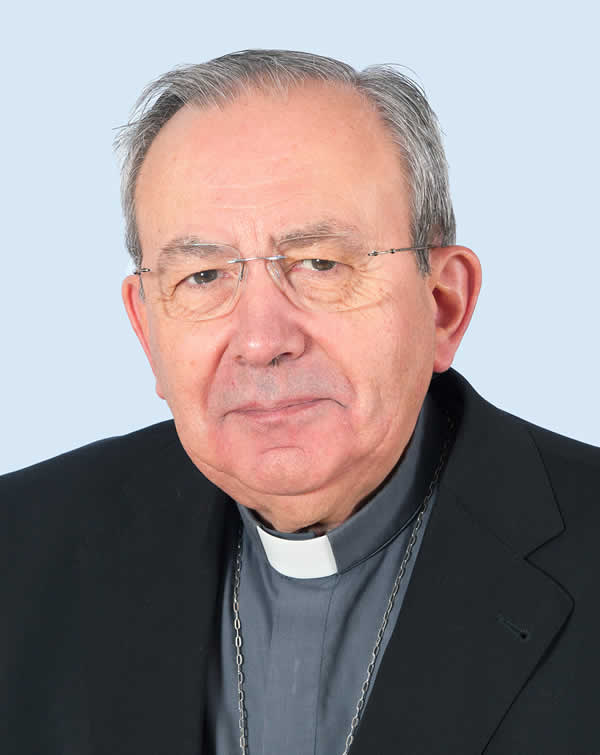
- Church: Catholic Church
- Appointed: 20 March 2003
- Installed: 2003
- Term ended: 2016
- Predecessor: Rafael Torija de la Fuente
- Successor: Gerardo Melgar Viciosa
- Previous post(s): Bishop of Teruel and Albarracín

Orders
- Ordination: 23 December 1967 by Saturnino Rubio Montiel
- Consecration: 29 September 1985 by Mario Tagliaferri

Personal details
- Born: Antonio Ángel Algora Hernando; 2 October 1940; La Vilueña, Spain
- Died: 15 October 2020 (aged 80); Madrid, Spain

Antonio Ángel Algora Hernando (2 October 1940 – 15 October 2020) was a Spanish prelate of the Catholic Church who served as bishop of Teruel and Albarracín from 1985 to 2003 and Ciudad Real from 2003 to 2016.

He died from complications of COVID-19 during the COVID-19 pandemic in Spain, in Madrid, thirteen days after his 80th birthday.
