= Diocese of Ciudad Real =

Catholic diocese in Spain

Coordinates: 38.9867°N 3.9311°W

Diocese of Ciudad Real Dioecesis Civitatis Regalensis Diócesis de Ciudad Real

Catholic
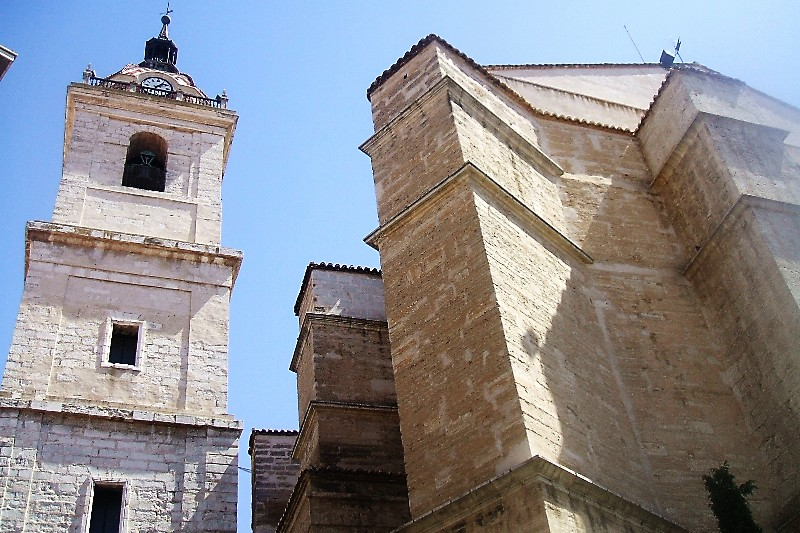
- Ciudad Real Cathedral

Location
- Country: Spain
- Ecclesiastical province: Toledo
- Metropolitan: Toledo

Statistics
- Area: 19,813 km^{2} (7,650 sq mi)
- Population: Total; Catholics: (as of 2006); 500,060; 493,060 (98.6%)

Information
- Denomination: Roman Catholic
- Rite: Latin Rite
- Established: 18 November 1875 (As Territorial Prelature of Ciudad Real); 4 February 1980 (As Diocese of Ciudad Real)
- Cathedral: Cathedral Basilica of Our Lady of the Meadows in Ciudad Real

Current leadership
- Pope: Leo XIV
- Bishop: Abilio Martínez Varea
- Metropolitan Archbishop: Braulio Rodríguez Plaza
- Auxiliary Bishops: Gerardo Melgar Viciosa

Map

Website
- Website of the Diocese

The Diocese of Ciudad Real (Latin: Dioecesis Civitatis Regalensis) is a Latin Church diocese of the Catholic Church located in the city of Ciudad Real in the ecclesiastical province of Toledo in Spain.

== History ==
- 18 November 1875: Established as Territorial Prelature of Ciudad Real for the Grand Prior of the Royal United Military Spanish Orders (Order of Santiago, Order of Alcantara, Order of Calatrava and Order of Montesa)
- 4 February 1980: Promoted as Diocese of Ciudad Real (the Bishop maintains also the title of Grand Prior)

== Leadership ==
- Prelates of Ciudad Real (Roman rite)
  - Victoriano Guisasola y Rodríguez (28 May 1877 – 27 Mar 1882 )
  - Antonio María Cascajares y Azara (27 Mar 1882 – 27 Mar 1884 )
  - José María Rancés y Villanueva † (10 Jun 1886 – 28 Nov 1898)
  - Casimiro Piñera y Naredo † (28 Nov 1898 – 28 Aug 1904 Died)
  - Remigio Gandásegui y Gorrochátegui (27 Mar 1905 – 28 May 1914 )
  - Francisco Javier de Irastorza Loinaz (11 Jul 1914 – 27 Jun 1922 )
  - Bl. Narciso de Esténaga y Echevarría (14 Dec 1922 – 22 Aug 1936)
  - Emeterio Echeverria Barrena (29 Dec 1942 – 25 Dec 1954 Died)
  - Juan Hervás y Benet (14 Mar 1955 – 30 Sep 1976 )
- Bishops of Ciudad Real (Roman rite)
  - Rafael Torija de la Fuente (30 Sep 1976 – 20 Mar 2003)
  - Antonio Ángel Algora Hernando (20 Mar 2003 – 8 Apr 2016)
  - Gerardo Melgar Viciosa (8 April 2016 – )

== See also ==
- Roman Catholicism in Spain
