= Miguelturra =

- Municipality
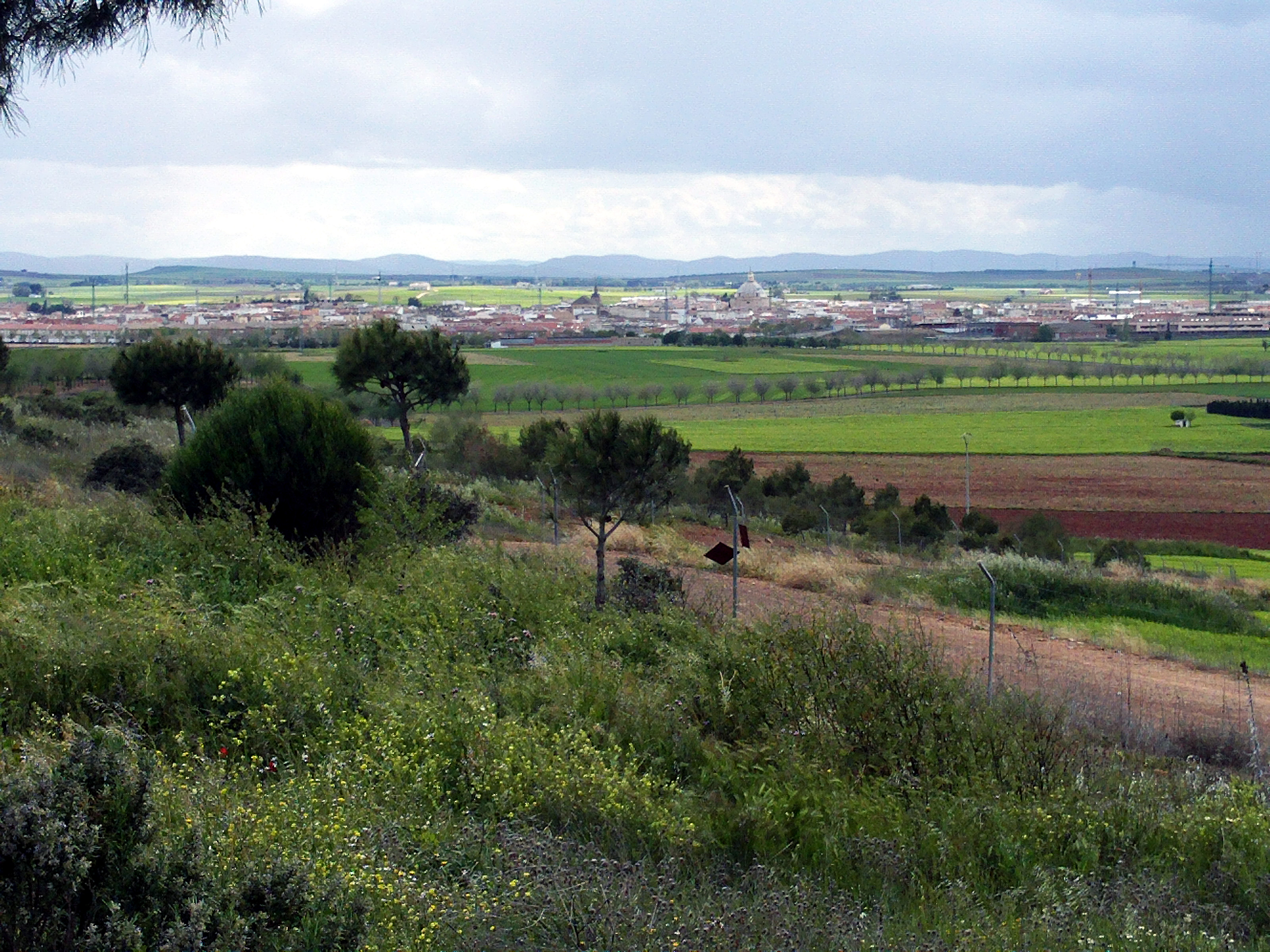

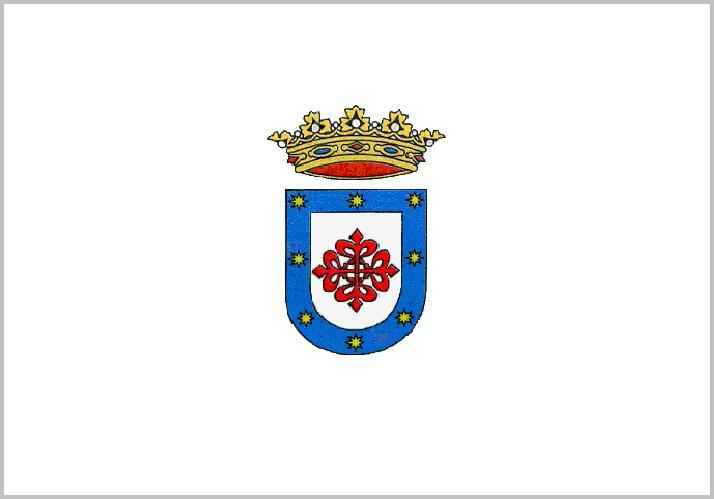
- Flag Coat of arms

- Location in Spain Miguelturra (Spain)
- Coordinates: 38°58′N 3°57′W
- Country: Spain
- Autonomous community: Castilla–La Mancha
- Province: Ciudad Real

Government
  - Mayor: Román Rivero Nieto (PSOE)

Area
  - Total: 118.12 km^{2} (45.61 sq mi)
- Elevation: 635 m (2,083 ft)

Population (2025-01-01)
  - Total: 15,924
  - Density: 134.81/km^{2} (349.16/sq mi)
- Demonym: Miguelturreños
- Time zone: UTC+1 (CET)
  - Summer (DST): UTC+2 (CEST)
- Postal code: 13650
- Website: Official website

Miguelturra is a municipality of Spain located in the province of Ciudad Real, Castilla–La Mancha. The municipality spans across a total area of 118.12 km^{2} and, as of 1 January 2020, it has a registered population of 15,498.

== History ==
Located within the possessions of the Order of Calatrava—the Campo de Calatrava—the masters of the Order established a market in the village seeking to disrupt the economic activity of nearby Ciudad Real, a realengo town embedded within the Calatravan territory. The order's feudal authority frequently quarrelled with the royal ones in Ciudad Real. In the 14th century troops from the latter stormed Miguelturra in seven occasions.

Currently Miguelturra is separate from Ciudad Real by just 500 meters.
