= Prior (ecclesiastical) =

Ecclesiastical title

Prior (or prioress) is an ecclesiastical title for a superior in some religious orders. The word is derived from the Latin for "earlier" or "first". The office may head a local house, a region of houses (prior provincial), or the entire order (prior general). Its earlier generic usage referred to any monastic superior. In abbeys, a prior would be lower in rank than the abbey's abbot or abbess.

== Monastic superiors ==
In the Rule of Saint Benedict, the term appears several times, referring to any superior, whether an abbot, provost, dean, etc. In other old monastic rules, the term is used in the same generic sense.

With the Cluniac Reforms, the term prior received a specific meaning; it supplanted the provost or dean (praepositus), spoken of in the Rule of St. Benedict. The example of the Cluniac congregations was gradually followed by all Benedictine monasteries, as well as by the Camaldolese, Vallombrosians, Cistercians, Hirsau congregations, and other offshoots of the Benedictine Order.

Monastic congregations of hermit origin generally do not use the title of abbot for the head of any of their houses, to avoid the involvement with the world the office of an abbot would entail. As a result, it is not used by the congregation as a whole. Among them, the equivalent term of 'prior general' is used. This applies, e.g., to the Camaldolese and the Carthusians.

The term is also used by various mendicant orders, e.g., the Carmelites and the Dominicans. This applies both to the friars and the nuns of these orders. The term connotes the idea that the 'prior general' is simply the "first among equals".

=== Compound and derived titles ===
The Benedictine Order and its branches, the Premonstratensian Order, and the military orders have three kinds of priors:

- the claustral prior
- the conventual prior
- the obedientiary prior

The Claustral prior (Latin prior claustralis), called dean in a few monasteries, holds the first place after the abbot (or grand-master in military orders), whom he assists in the government of the monastery, functioning effectively as the abbot's second-in-charge. He has no ordinary jurisdiction by virtue of his office, since he performs the duties of his office entirely according to the will and under the direction of the abbot. Therefore, his jurisdiction is delegated and extends just as far as the abbot desires, or the congregation's constitutions prescribe. He is appointed by the abbot, generally after a consultation in chapter with the professed monks of the monastery, and may be removed by him at any time.

In many monasteries, especially larger ones, the claustral prior is assisted by a sub-prior, who holds the third place in the monastery. In former times, there were larger monasteries, besides the prior and the sub-prior, as well as a third, fourth, and sometimes even a fifth prior. Each of these was called circa (or circator), because it was his duty to make the rounds of the monastery to see whether anything was amiss and whether the brethren were intent on the work allotted to them respectively. He had no authority to correct or punish the brethren, but was to report to the claustral prior whatever he found amiss or contrary to the rules. In the Congregation of Cluny and others of the tenth, eleventh and twelfth centuries there was also a greater prior (prior major) who preceded the claustral prior in dignity and, besides assisting the abbot in the government of the monastery, had some delegated jurisdiction over external dependencies of the abbey. In the high days of Cluny, the abbot was assisted by a coadjutor styled Grand-Prior (Grand-prieur in French).

The Conventual prior (Latin prior conventualis) is the independent superior of a monastery that is not an abbey (and which is therefore called a "priory"). In some orders, like the Benedictines, a monastery remains a priory until it is considered stable enough and large enough to be elevated to the rank of an abbey. In other Orders, like the Camaldolese and Carthusians, conventual priors are the norm and there are no abbots. (The superior of the major houses of Camaldolese nuns, however, is called an abbess.)

This title, in its feminine form prioress, is used for monasteries of nuns in the Dominican and Carmelite orders.

An Obedientiary Prior heads a monastery created as a satellite of an abbey. When an abbey becomes too large or when a monastery is needed in a new area, the abbot may appoint a group of monks under a prior to begin a new foundation. The foundation remains a dependency of the mother abbey until it is large and stable enough to become an independent abbey of its own.

A Prior Provincial and is the regional superior of certain Orders, such as the Order of Friars Preachers Dominicans or the Carmelite friars. In this last case, the head of the whole Order is called the Prior General.

Among communities of friars, the second superior is called the sub-prior, and his office is similar to that of the claustral prior in the Benedictine Order.

== Chivalric orders ==
In the medieval order of St. John (also known as the Knights Hospitaller), a grand prior acted as the administrator of an order province known as a grand priory. These grand priories were joined into larger administrative units known as "langues", which roughly encompassed the order's properties within a single language sphere. The grand priories were sometimes subdivided into smaller priories and bailiwicks, and at the lowest level, into commanderies. While the subdivision into langues was abolished in 1798, the subdivision into grand priories still exists within the sovereign Order of Malta, the modern successor of the historical Order of St. John. Other chivalric orders, such as the military Order of Christ, the Knights of Santiago, or in general, the orders founded in the context of the Reconquista, only had one Grand Prior who acted as the Orders' Chief-cleric. During the peak of the order's influence, the chivalric grand priors were considered equal in rank to a bishop. Since 1953, the priories of the Spanish Chivalric Order have been held in personal union by the bishop of Ciudad Real. Within the Order of the Holy Sepulcher, the title of grand prior is held by the Latin patriarch of Jerusalem.

== See also ==
- Friar
- Catholic religious order
- Priory

== Bibliography ==
- O'Neill, Elizabeth (1911). "Prior" . Encyclopædia Britannica. Vol. 22 (11th ed.). pp. 359–360.
