= Manolo el del Bombo =

Spanish football superfan (1949–2025)

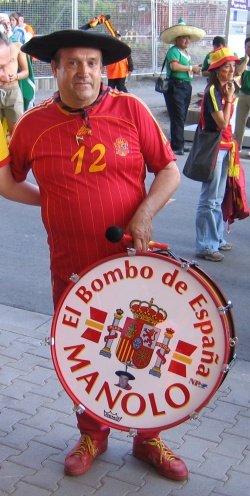
- Manolo at the 2006 FIFA World Cup
- Born: Manuel Cáceres Artesero; 15 January 1949; Ciudad Real, Spain
- Died: 1 May 2025 (aged 76); Villarreal, Spain
- Occupation: Fan

Manuel Cáceres Artesero (15 January 1949 – 1 May 2025), better known as Manolo el del Bombo (English: Manolo the Bass Drummer), was described as one of the most famous football fans in Spain.

== Biography ==
Raised in Huesca, he was Valencia CF's and the Spain national football team's most famous supporter. He was recognizable by his large beret, red number 12 jersey and bass drum, "El bombo de España" (The drum of Spain), which he would bang throughout matches.

Manolo first travelled abroad to watch Spain in 1979 and was present at all of Spain's international matches from 1982 onwards. On 3 July 2010, he missed his first game: Spain–Paraguay at 2010 FIFA World Cup in South Africa, due to pneumonia.

At the 1982 FIFA World Cup in Spain, he hitchhiked 15,800 kilometers in order to follow his team and to show that nobody else paid his travel expenses.

He owned the bar Tu Museo Deportivo next to the Estadio Mestalla, which doubled as a sports museum. It was closed in 2011.

Manolo was not allowed to bring his bass drum to the 2018 FIFA World Cup matches in Russia, so he decided to no longer travel abroad with the drum.

Manolo died from respiratory problems in Villareal, on 1 May 2025, at the age of 76. His family suspects that the major blackout that hit the country on 28 April may have affected him directly.
