= Ciudad Real Cathedral =

Catholic Cathedral in Ciudad Real, Spain

- Holy Priory Church Cathedral-Basilica of the Military Orders of Our Lady Saint Mary of the Prado
- Santa Iglesia Prioral Basílica Catedral de las Órdenes Militares de Nuestra Señora Santa María del Prado
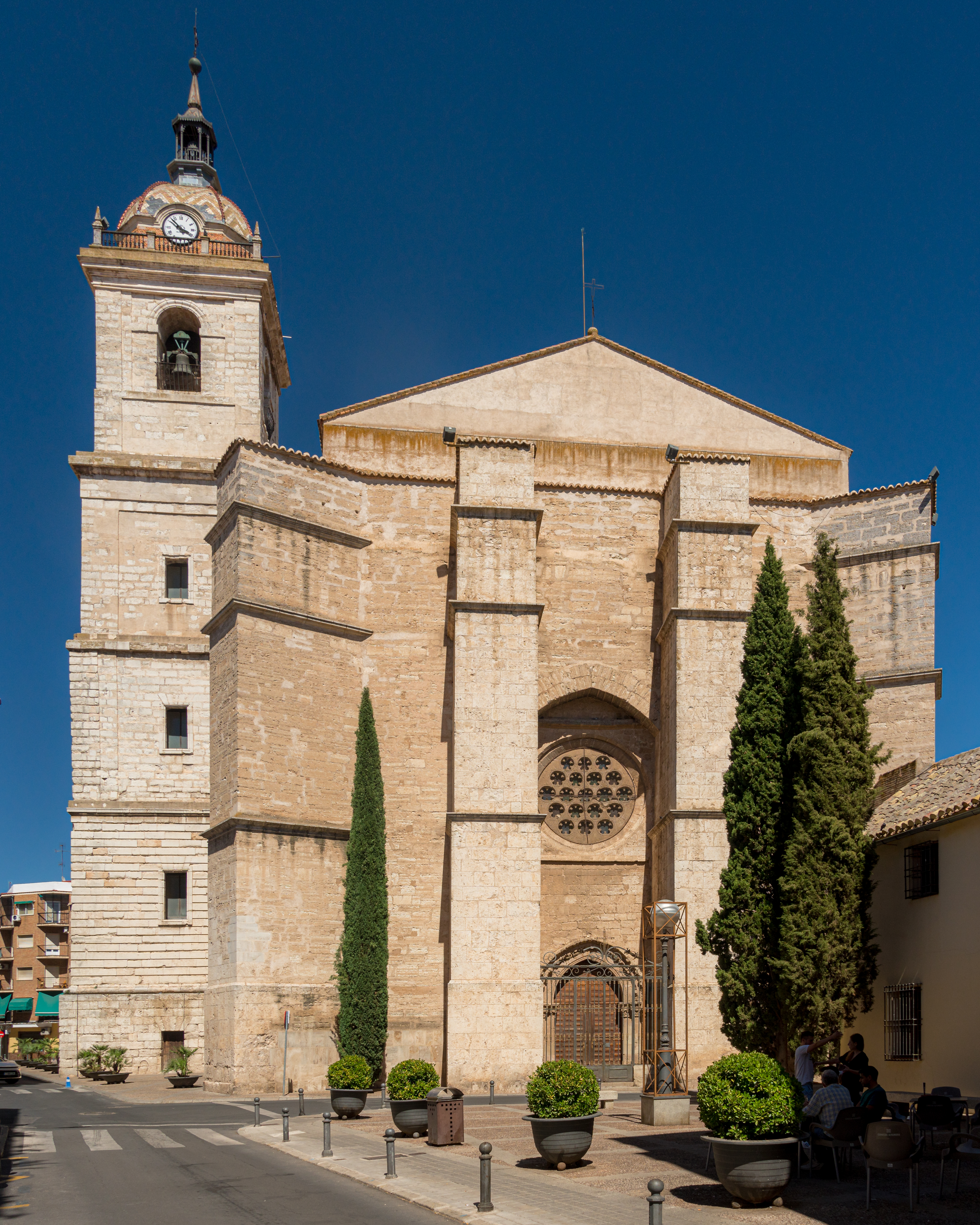
- West façade in 2022.
- Ciudad Real Cathedral
- 38.986324°N 3.93096°W
- Location: Ciudad Real
- Address: 11, Reyes Street
- Country: Spain
- Denomination: Catholic

History
- Status: Cathedral
- Dedication: Mary, Mother of Jesus
- Dedicated: 5 March 1981

Architecture
- Style: Gothic
- Completed: 1514

Administration
- Metropolis: Toledo
- Diocese: Ciudad Real

Clergy
- Bishop: Gerardo Melgar Viciosa

Spanish Cultural Heritage
- Type: Non-movable
- Criteria: Monument
- Designated: 3 June 1931
- Reference no.: RI-51-0000514

The Holy Priory Church Cathedral Basilica of the Military Orders of Our Lady Saint Mary of the Prado, also known as the Cathedral of Saint Mary of the Prado for short, is located in Ciudad Real, autonomous region of Castile-La Mancha, Spain.

Construction began in the 15th century in Gothic style, although it has elements of late Romanesque, Renaissance and Baroque styles; it has undergone many restorations with the first remodelling credited to Alfonso X (23 November 1221 – 4 April 1284) since the Romanesque period. It was completed in the mid 16th century after construction of the roof vaults. The tower was built in the early 19th century.

Since 1875, it is the priory of four military orders of Spain (Calatrava, Montesa, Santiago and Alcántara). The structure is a monument indexed in the Spanish heritage register of Bien de Interés Cultural.

== History and architecture ==
The oldest part of the cathedral is the Door of Forgiveness (Puerta del Perdón) from the late 13th or early 14th century, which may have been reassembled later. It was probably the door of the primitive chapel which stood on the site of today's cathedral church. The cathedral was built in stages, combining the Gothic and Renaissance styles. The apse dates to the early 15th century, the eastern section of the nave is from 1514 while the remainder was completed c. 1580. The cathedral consists principally of a huge nave, 34 m (112 ft) high, 53 m (174 ft) long and 18 m (59 ft) wide, the second largest in Spain after that of Girona Cathedral. The Chapel of the Virgin and the sacristy are in the 17th-century Baroque style. The tower, rebuilt in 1825, has recently been restored. During the Spanish Civil War, the cathedral was used as a military garage. As a result, many of its treasures were stolen or destroyed.

The architectural style of the Perdón doorway is in Gothic with Romanesque features while the Renaissance style is seen in the southern doorway; Perdón doorway is conjectured to belong to the reign of Alfonso X. The tower built in the 19th century is in stone masonry and it is in four tiers.

== Interior ==
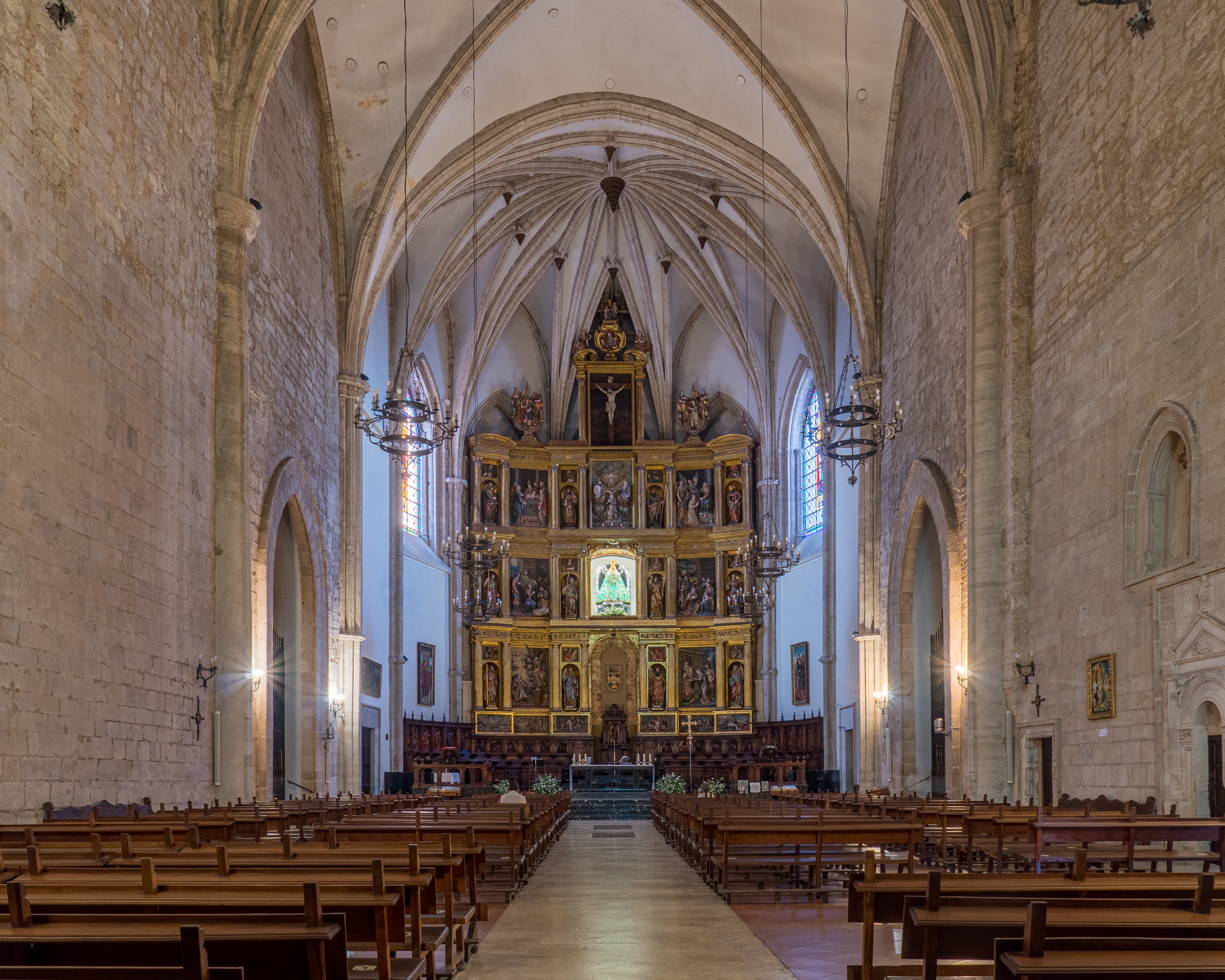
Baroque altarpiece (1616)

The magnificent Baroque altarpiece is the work of Giraldo de Merlo and his son-in-law, the painter Juan de Hasten. The work was continued by the brothers Cristóbal and Pedro Ruiz Delvira who charged Juan de Villaseca to implement a design created by Andrés de la Concha, completed in 1616. The altarpiece is dedicated to the Virgen of the Prado, the patron saint of Ciudad Real. The carved walnut pews are from the first half of the 18th century. The Sacristy has many paintings. There is also a chest of drawers made in a Baroque style.

The church of Santa Maria del Prado gained the status of cathedral by papal bull in 1981.

== Restorations ==
- 1967 - First restoration of the bells: bells recast, providing them with metal yokes
- 1983 - 1986 : Restoration of the tower
- 1987 - 1988 - Second restoration of the bells, recast and new mechanization
- 1992 - Third restoration of the bells: minor welding hood
- 1998 - 2002 - Restoration of the facades and the ceiling of the old sacristy
- 2001 - Restoration of the organ
- 2003 - 2004 - Restoration of the altarpiece
- 2009 - 2010 - Restoration of the Virgen del Prado Chapel

== Bibliography ==
- Casas, Narciso (2013). Historia y Arte en las Catedrales de España (in Spanish). Bubok. ISBN 978-84-686-3201-8.
- María del Pilar Pérez Nieto-Sandoval (2004). Estudio histórico-artístico de la Catedral de Ciudad Real (in Spanish). Diputación Provincial de Ciudad Real.
- Sainz Magaña, E., Herrera Maldonado, E. & Almarcha Nuñez-Herrador, E., Ciudad Real y su provincia, Tomo III, Ed. Gever, Sevilla, 1997. ISBN 84 88566-42-5.
