= Rafael Torija de la Fuente =

Spanish Catholic bishop (1927–2019)

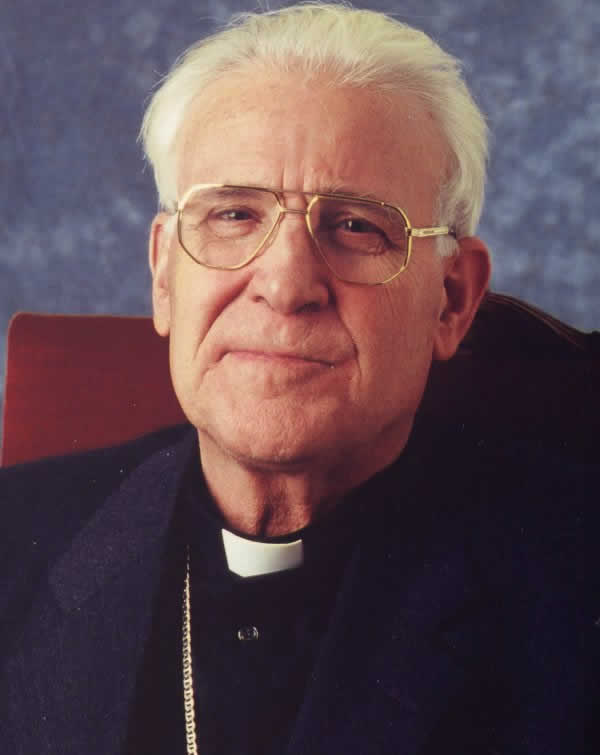
Rafael Torija de la Fuente, 2016

Rafael Torija de la Fuente (18 March 1927 – 2 March 2019) was a Spanish Catholic bishop.

== Early life ==
Torija de la Fuente was born in Noez, Spain and was ordained to the priesthood in 1952. He served as titular bishop of Ursona and auxiliary bishop of the Roman Catholic Diocese of Santander, Spain, from 1969 to 1976. He then served as the territorial prelate of Ciudad Real, (Gran) Prior of the Royal Spanish Military Orders and (titular) bishop of Dora from 1976 to 1980. He then served as the first bishop of the Diocese of Ciudad Real from 1980 to 2003.
