= Ciudad Real =

- Municipality
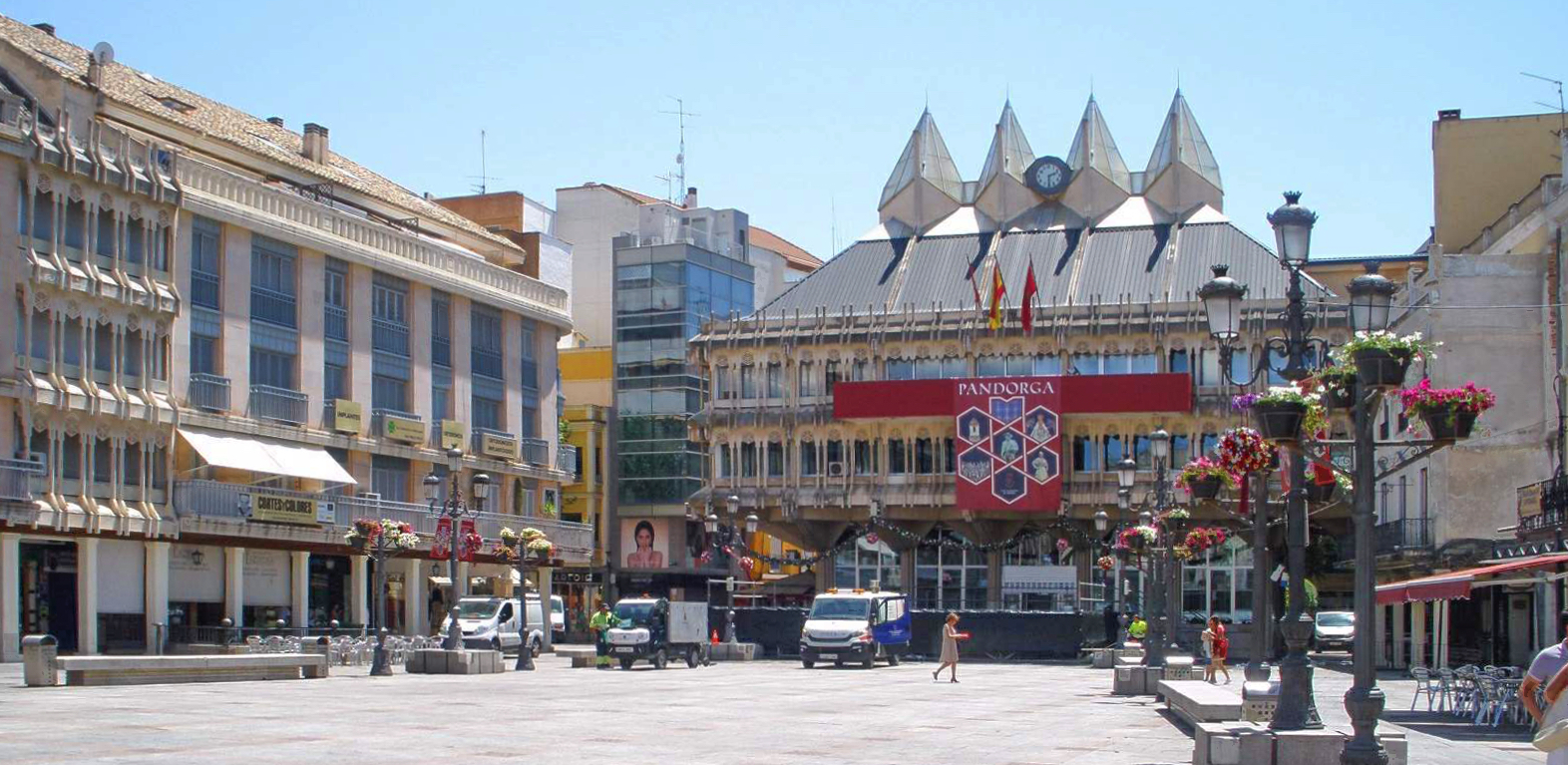
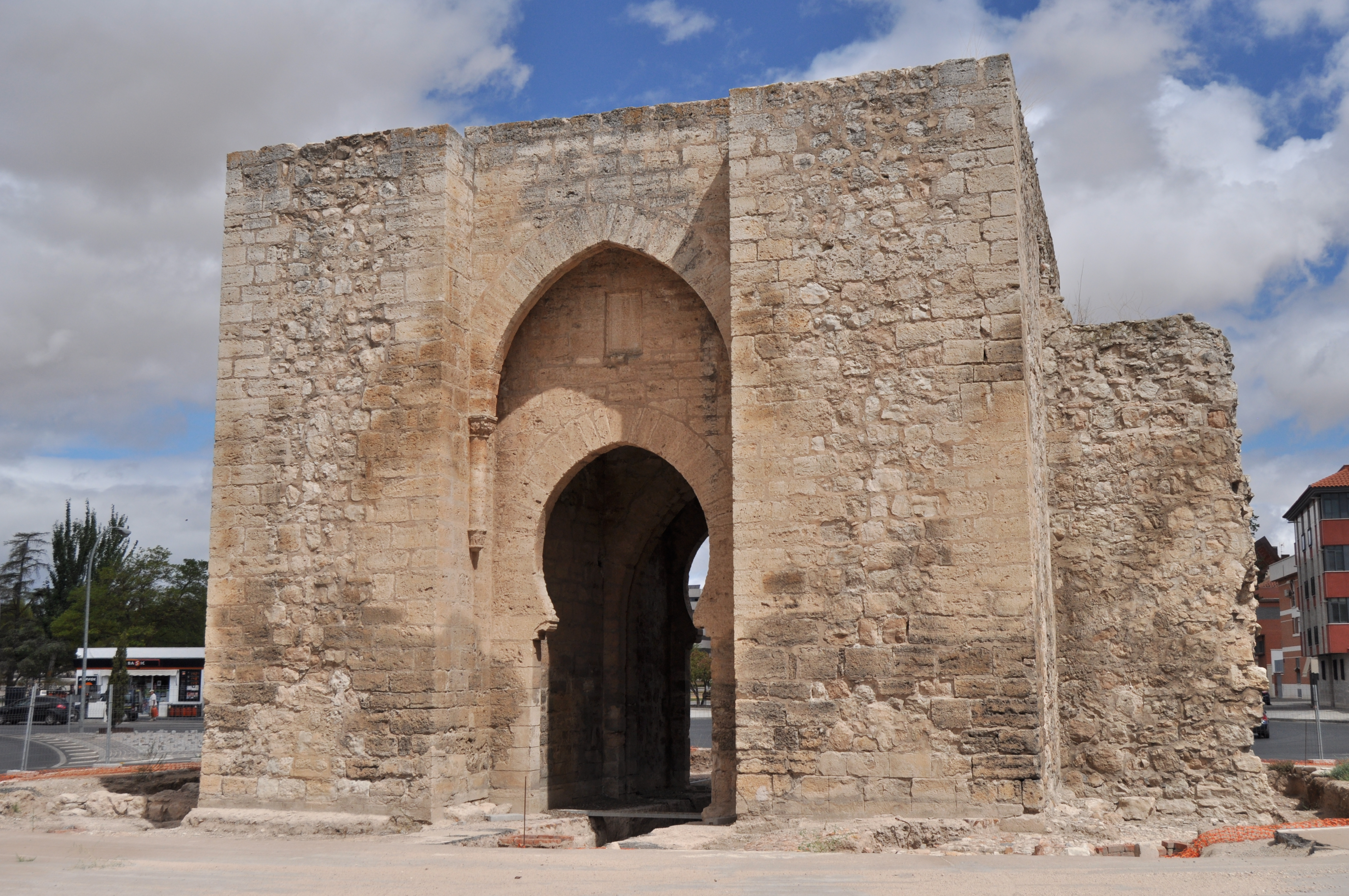
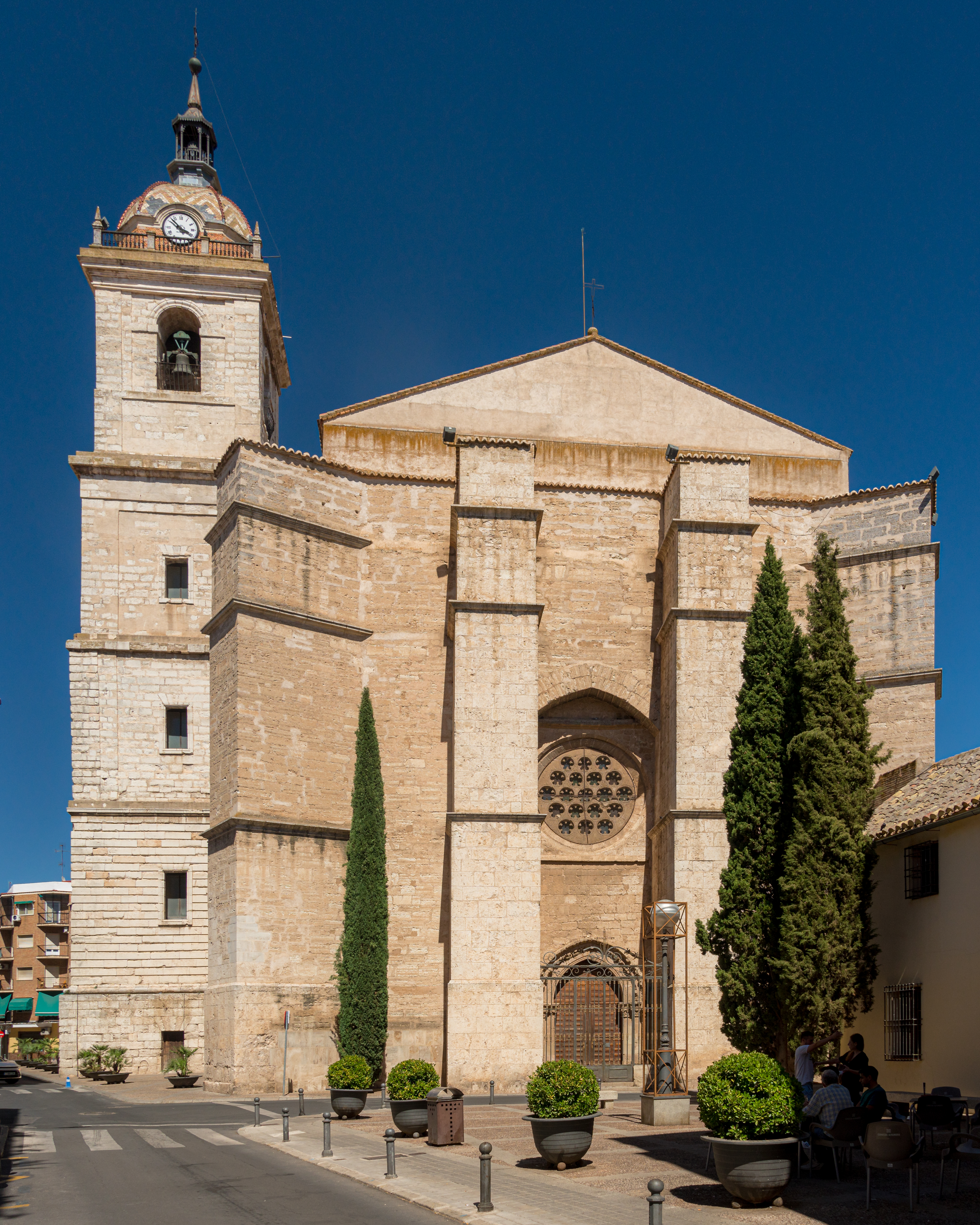
- Plaza Mayor de Ciudad Real Puerta de Toledo Cathedral

- Flag Coat of arms
- Interactive map of Ciudad Real
- Coordinates: 38°59′N 3°55′W
- Country: Spain
- Autonomous community: Castilla–La Mancha
- Province: Ciudad Real

Government
  - Type: Ayuntamiento
  - Body: Ayuntamiento de Ciudad Real
  - Mayor: Francisco Cañizares (PP)

Area
  - Total: 289.98 km^{2} (111.96 sq mi)
- Elevation: 628 m (2,060 ft)

Population (2025-01-01)
  - Total: 76,217
  - Density: 262.84/km^{2} (680.74/sq mi)
- Demonym: Ciudadrealeño/a
- Time zone: UTC+1 (CET)
  - Summer (DST): UTC+2 (CEST)
- Postal code: 13001-13005
- Website: Official website

Ciudad Real (US: /sjuːˌdɑːd reɪˈɑːl, -ˌðɑːð/, Spanish: [θjuˈðað reˈal]) is a municipality of Spain located in the autonomous community of Castile–La Mancha, capital of the province of Ciudad Real. It is the 5th most populated municipality in the region.

It was founded as Villa Real in 1255 as a royal demesne town and enclave long surrounded by territory belonging to the military order of Calatrava. Its history in the late middle ages was influenced by friction with the latter.

== History ==
It was founded in 1255 with the name Villa Real ('Royal Town') under the auspices of Alfonso X, who granted it a charter that followed the model of Cuenca's. It was not founded from scratch, but founded over Pozuelo de San Gil, a hamlet belonging to the land of Alarcos. An independent royal demesne enclave embedded within the dominion of the Military Order of Calatrava, repopulation struggled initially. Weary of the influence of Villa Real, the masters of the Order of Calatrava established a rival market in nearby Miguelturra seeking to disrupt the town's economic activity.

Jews soon settled in Villa Real, with the existence of a middle-sized jewry already documented by 1290, only three decades after the foundation of Villa Real.

Friction between Villa Real and the Order of Calatrava reached its climax towards 1323, with an armed conflict between the two parties.

Villa Real hosted the Cortes of Castile in 1346.

The local aljama was by and large dismantled upon the 1391 pogroms. The endogenous element of antisemitism was underpinned by the Jews' deals with the Calatravans throughout the 14th century and their local reputation as loan sharks.

Juan II of Castile granted Villa Real the status of city in 1420, thus becoming Ciudad Real ('Royal City'). The city most probably did not have more than 2000 inhabitants by the time and despite having celebrated Cortes once, the dominant city in the area was still Almagro.

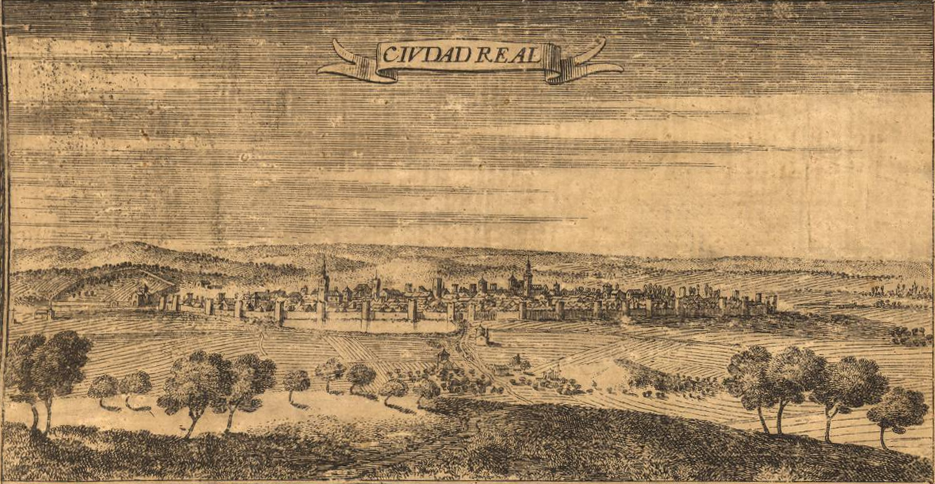
City panorama by Johann Friedrich Leonart (1687)

After the unification of the Iberian kingdoms under the Catholic Monarchs, Ciudad Real became the capital of the province of La Mancha in 1691. This fact favoured its economic development which was shown by the construction of several important buildings. The 1755 Lisbon earthquake destroyed many of these buildings. In 1809, during the Peninsular War, French troops defeated the Spanish army and occupied the town, using the local hospital as their headquarters and barracks.

Following the creation of the province of Ciudad Real as per the 1833 territorial division, the status of provincial capital of Ciudad Real was challenged by the cities of Almagro and Manzanares, with a similar population by the mid-nineteenth century. However the initiatives intending to take the provincial capital out of Ciudad Real did not succeed.

Much of the centre was destroyed during the Spanish Civil War.

== Geography ==
=== Location ===
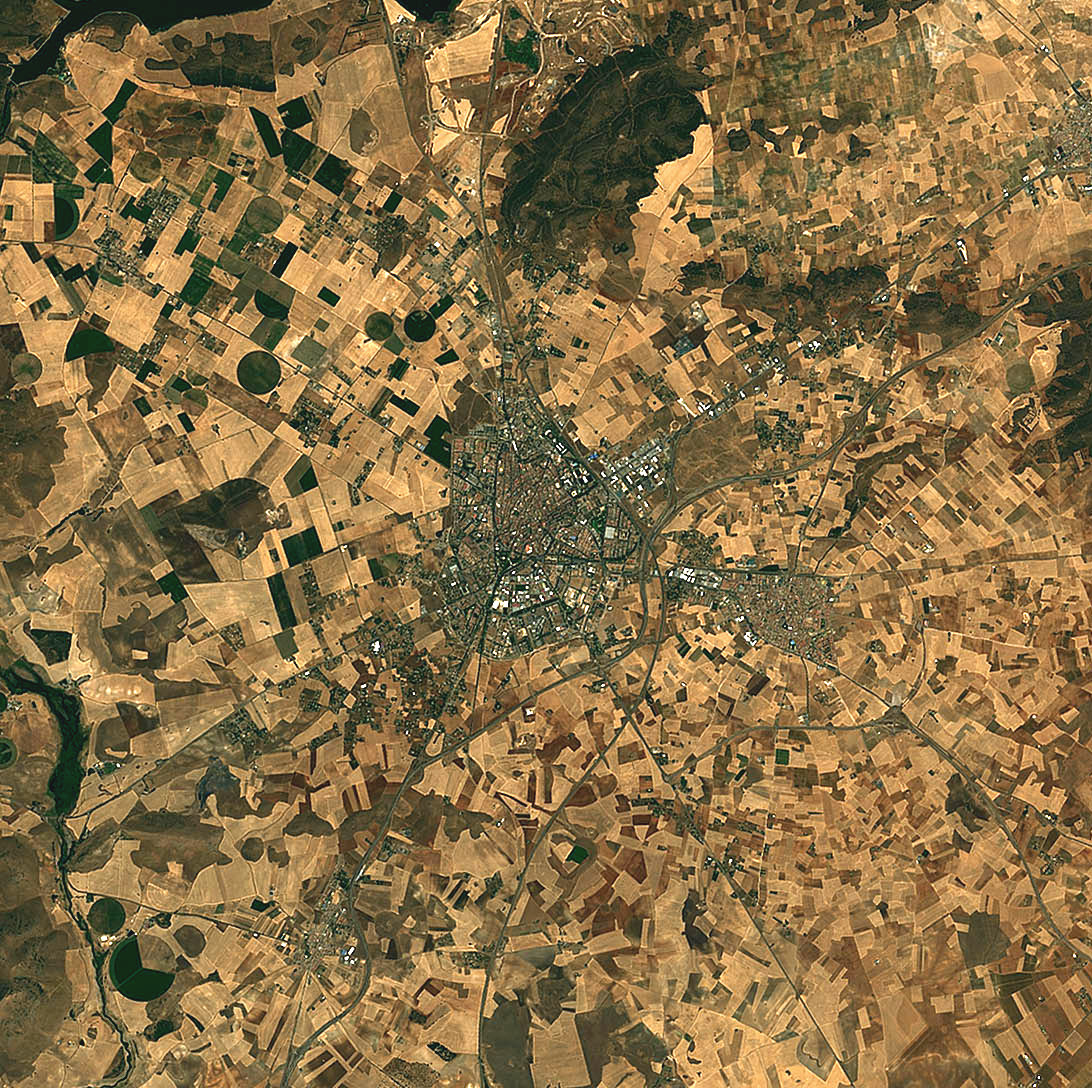
Satellite view of Ciudad Real and Miguelturra

Ciudad Real is located in the southern half of the Inner Plateau, in the central part of the Iberian Peninsula, at about 625 metres above sea level.

The city is part of the Campo de Calatrava natural region, a transitional region between the Montes and La Mancha, remarkable in the context of the Iberian Peninsula because of its volcanic origin. The plaza del Pilar is precisely built on the centre of a shallow volcanic maar. As Ciudad Real itself was the capital of the province of La Mancha in the 18th century, the whole province of Ciudad Real is often considered as part of La Mancha in a wider sense.

The location of Ciudad Real—without any major water stream passing through the city—leaves the Guadiana to the North and the Jabalón (a left-bank tributary of the former) to the South.

The urban nucleus was founded 7.5 km to the northeast of Alarcos (a fortified archeological site located on a hill). Despite enjoying a location at the crossroads of the Madrid–Andalusia and the Levante–Portugal corridors, the city did not particularly prosper historically thanks to this circumstance. The city currently forms a near urban continuum with neighbouring Miguelturra.

=== Climate ===
The city has a cold semi-arid climate (Köppen: BSk), with cool winters (due to its altitude) and hot to very hot dry summers. Like many other cities of Castilla-La-Mancha, the precipitation is limited throughout the year. It has one of the highest annual temperature ranges in the Iberian Peninsula, exceeding 20.0 °C (36.0 °F).

The precipitation in the Campo de Calatrava is sparse, with a high year-to-year variability and the area features high levels of evapotranspiration, particularly in Summer.

Climate data for Ciudad Real 628m (1991–2020), extremes (1920–present)
Month	Jan	Feb	Mar	Apr	May	Jun	Jul	Aug	Sep	Oct	Nov	Dec	Year
Record high °C (°F)	20.4 (68.7)	25.0 (77.0)	30.0 (86.0)	35.1 (95.2)	38.6 (101.5)	42.7 (108.9)	44.2 (111.6)	42.6 (108.7)	40.0 (104.0)	33.2 (91.8)	28.0 (82.4)	20.2 (68.4)	44.2 (111.6)
Mean daily maximum °C (°F)	11.1 (52.0)	13.8 (56.8)	17.7 (63.9)	20.3 (68.5)	25.1 (77.2)	31.0 (87.8)	34.9 (94.8)	34.2 (93.6)	28.3 (82.9)	22.0 (71.6)	15.1 (59.2)	11.5 (52.7)	22.1 (71.8)
Daily mean °C (°F)	6.3 (43.3)	8.2 (46.8)	11.5 (52.7)	14.0 (57.2)	18.4 (65.1)	23.7 (74.7)	27.2 (81.0)	26.7 (80.1)	21.7 (71.1)	16.2 (61.2)	10.2 (50.4)	7.0 (44.6)	15.9 (60.7)
Mean daily minimum °C (°F)	1.5 (34.7)	2.6 (36.7)	5.2 (41.4)	7.7 (45.9)	11.6 (52.9)	16.4 (61.5)	19.5 (67.1)	19.2 (66.6)	15.1 (59.2)	10.4 (50.7)	5.3 (41.5)	2.5 (36.5)	9.8 (49.6)
Record low °C (°F)	−13.8 (7.2)	−9.4 (15.1)	−7.0 (19.4)	−3.8 (25.2)	0.0 (32.0)	4.2 (39.6)	6.2 (43.2)	7.2 (45.0)	1.0 (33.8)	−3.0 (26.6)	−8.0 (17.6)	−10.2 (13.6)	−13.8 (7.2)
Average precipitation mm (inches)	34.2 (1.35)	31.8 (1.25)	39.3 (1.55)	48.9 (1.93)	38.5 (1.52)	20.0 (0.79)	3.1 (0.12)	6.7 (0.26)	31.9 (1.26)	53.6 (2.11)	46.4 (1.83)	51.8 (2.04)	406.2 (16.01)
Average precipitation days	6.1	5.5	5.6	7.5	6.0	2.9	0.6	1.0	3.9	6.7	6.7	6.7	59.2
Average snowy days	1	0.9	0.3	0	0	0	0	0	0	0	0	0.3	2.5
Average relative humidity (%)	78	70	61	58	51	42	35	39	51	65	75	81	59
Mean monthly sunshine hours	136	170	217	237	273	327	366	335	264	208	141	124	2,798
Percentage possible sunshine	45	56	58	60	62	73	81	79	71	60	47	42	61
Source: Agencia Estatal de Meteorología (AEMET OpenData)

Climate data for Ciudad Real 628m (1981–2010)
Month	Jan	Feb	Mar	Apr	May	Jun	Jul	Aug	Sep	Oct	Nov	Dec	Year
Mean daily maximum °C (°F)	10.9 (51.6)	13.7 (56.7)	17.9 (64.2)	19.7 (67.5)	24.1 (75.4)	30.5 (86.9)	34.5 (94.1)	33.7 (92.7)	28.4 (83.1)	21.5 (70.7)	15.1 (59.2)	11.4 (52.5)	21.8 (71.2)
Daily mean °C (°F)	6.0 (42.8)	8.0 (46.4)	11.4 (52.5)	13.4 (56.1)	17.5 (63.5)	23.2 (73.8)	26.7 (80.1)	26.1 (79.0)	21.6 (70.9)	15.8 (60.4)	10.1 (50.2)	6.9 (44.4)	15.6 (60.1)
Mean daily minimum °C (°F)	1.1 (34.0)	2.4 (36.3)	4.9 (40.8)	7.1 (44.8)	10.9 (51.6)	15.9 (60.6)	18.9 (66.0)	18.6 (65.5)	14.8 (58.6)	10.0 (50.0)	5.1 (41.2)	2.5 (36.5)	9.3 (48.7)
Average precipitation mm (inches)	35.0 (1.38)	30.0 (1.18)	28.0 (1.10)	48.0 (1.89)	41.0 (1.61)	25.0 (0.98)	6.0 (0.24)	5.0 (0.20)	26.0 (1.02)	53.0 (2.09)	45.0 (1.77)	59.0 (2.32)	401 (15.78)
Average precipitation days	5.9	5.7	4.7	7.8	6.3	3.4	0.8	1.0	3.6	6.4	6.4	7.4	59.4
Average snowy days	1	0.9	0.2	0.1	0	0	0	0	0	0	0	0.3	2.5
Average relative humidity (%)	78.0	71.0	61.0	59.0	55.0	46.0	40.0	43.0	54.0	67.0	76.0	81.0	61.0
Mean monthly sunshine hours	133	157	213	226	260	313	352	323	247	190	135	114	2,663
Source: Agencia Estatal de Meteorología

== Sports ==
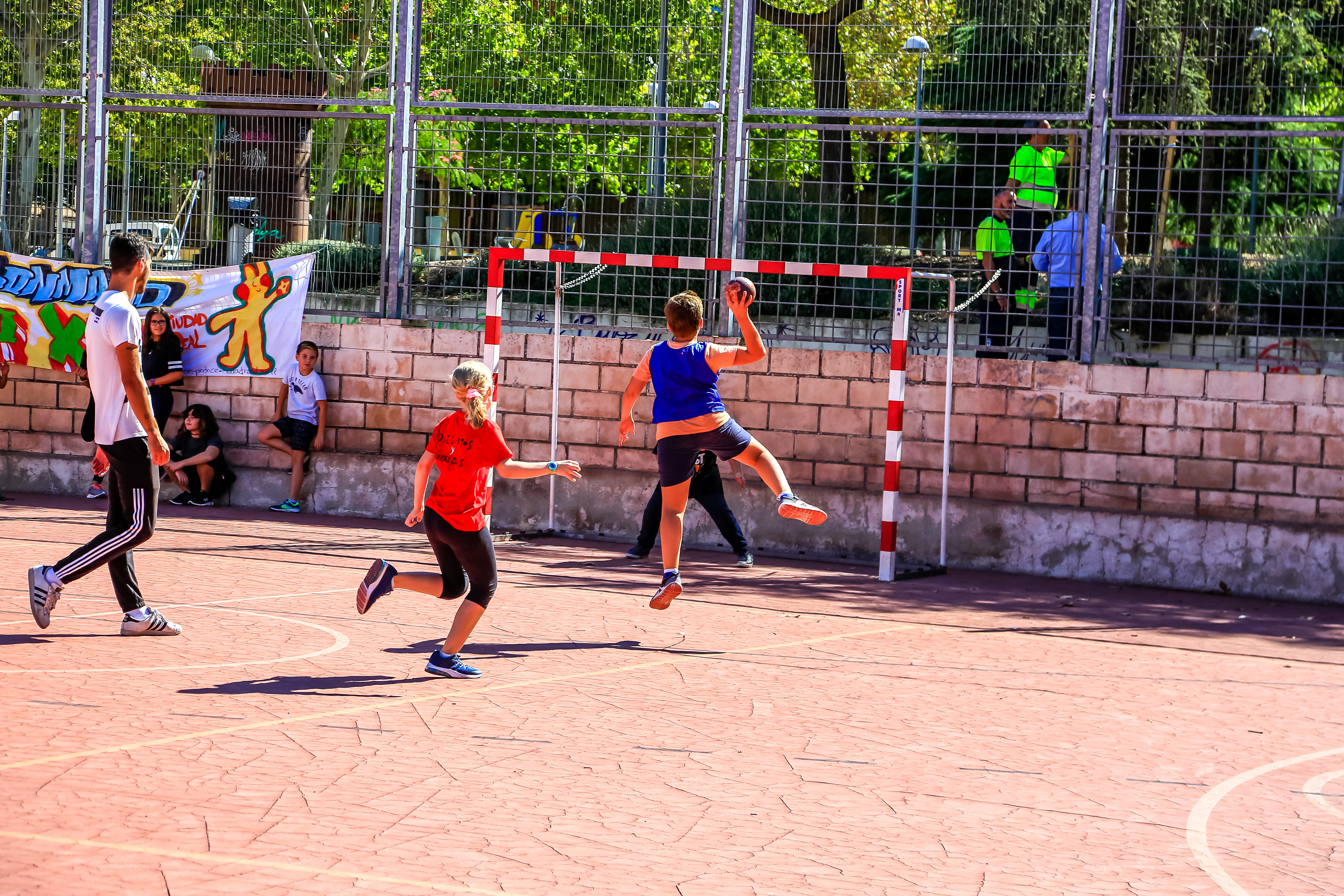
Kids playing pick-up handball in Ciudad Real

The city previously had a handball team, the BM Ciudad Real, which was the winner of the handball EHF Champions League in 2006, 2008 and 2009.

The handball club was one of the best in the world and its home arena, the Don Quixote Arena, was one of the biggest in the Spanish professional league. BM Ciudad Real, however, moved its team to Madrid in 2011; renamed as "Atlético Madrid", it dissolved in 2013.

== Transport ==
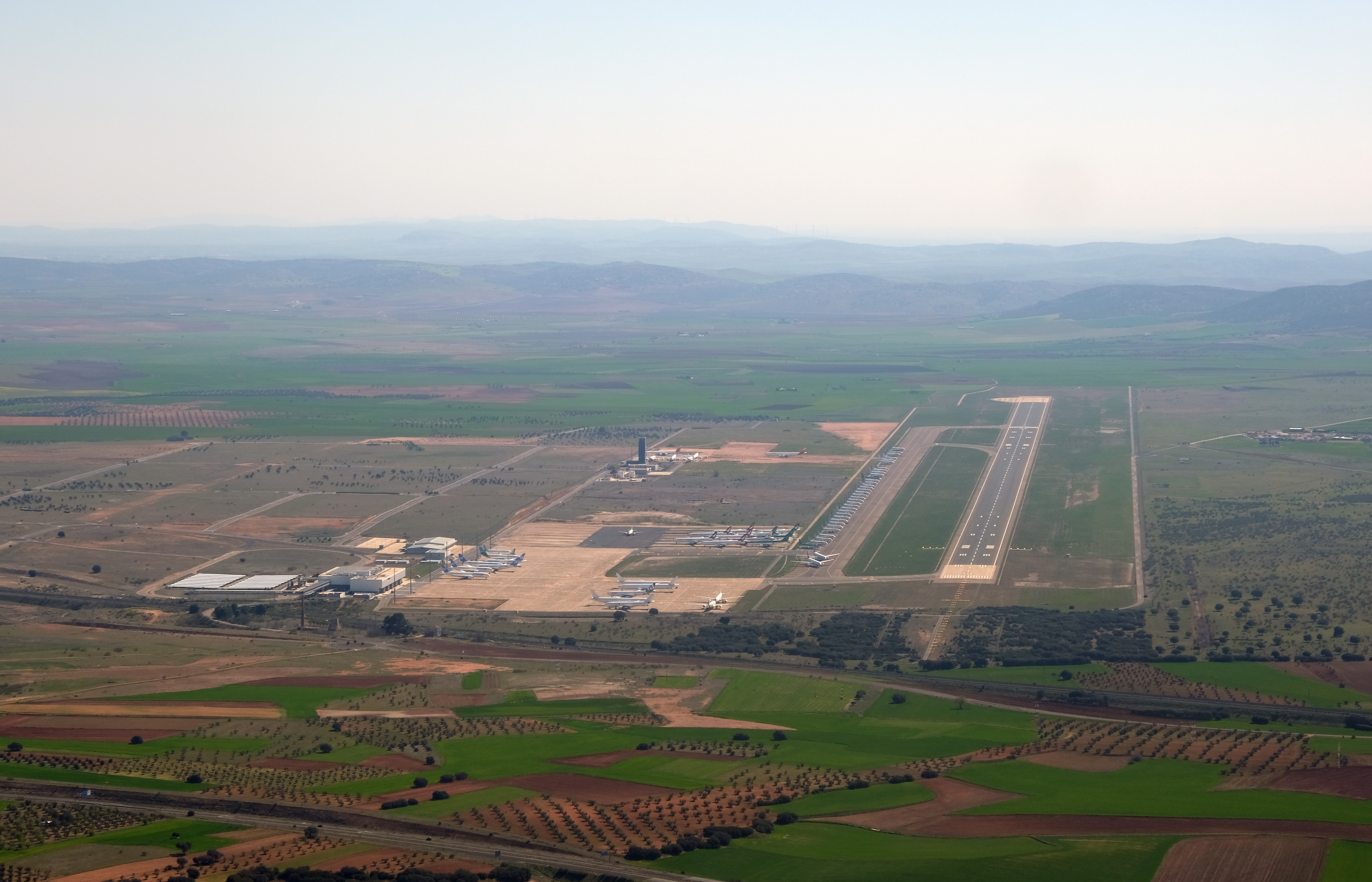
Ciudad Real Airport

The city has a railway station on a high-speed rail line, the Ciudad Real railway station.

A high-capacity airport (Ciudad Real Central Airport) was built in the city, but closed in 2012. The privately funded airport cost an estimated €1 billion to build, and was for sale for €100 million plus payment of the developer's debt. In July 2014 this was reduced to €80 million in a further attempt to find a buyer. In July 2015 the airport was auctioned to the lone bidder, Chinese company Tzaneen International, for €10,000.

The airport was reopened on 12 September 2019.

The average amount of time people spend commuting with public transit in Ciudad Real, for example to and from work, on a weekday is 33 min. 3% of public transit riders, ride for more than 2 hours every day. The average amount of time people wait at a stop or station for public transit is 8 min, while 1% of riders wait for over 20 minutes on average every day. The average distance people usually ride in a single trip with public transit is 2 km, while 0% travel for over 12 km in a single direction.

== Main sights ==
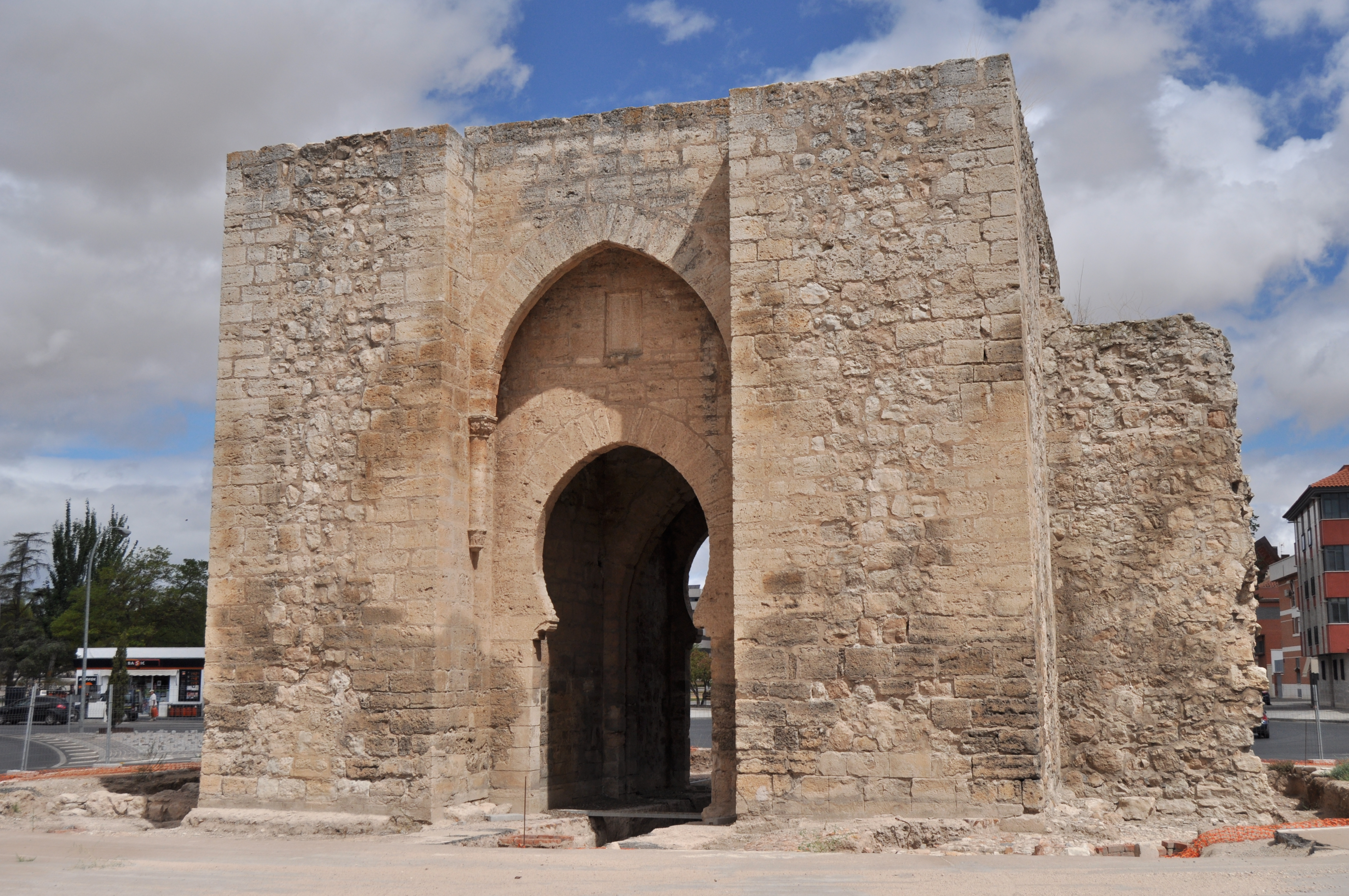
The Gate of Toledo dates from the 13th or 14th centuries.

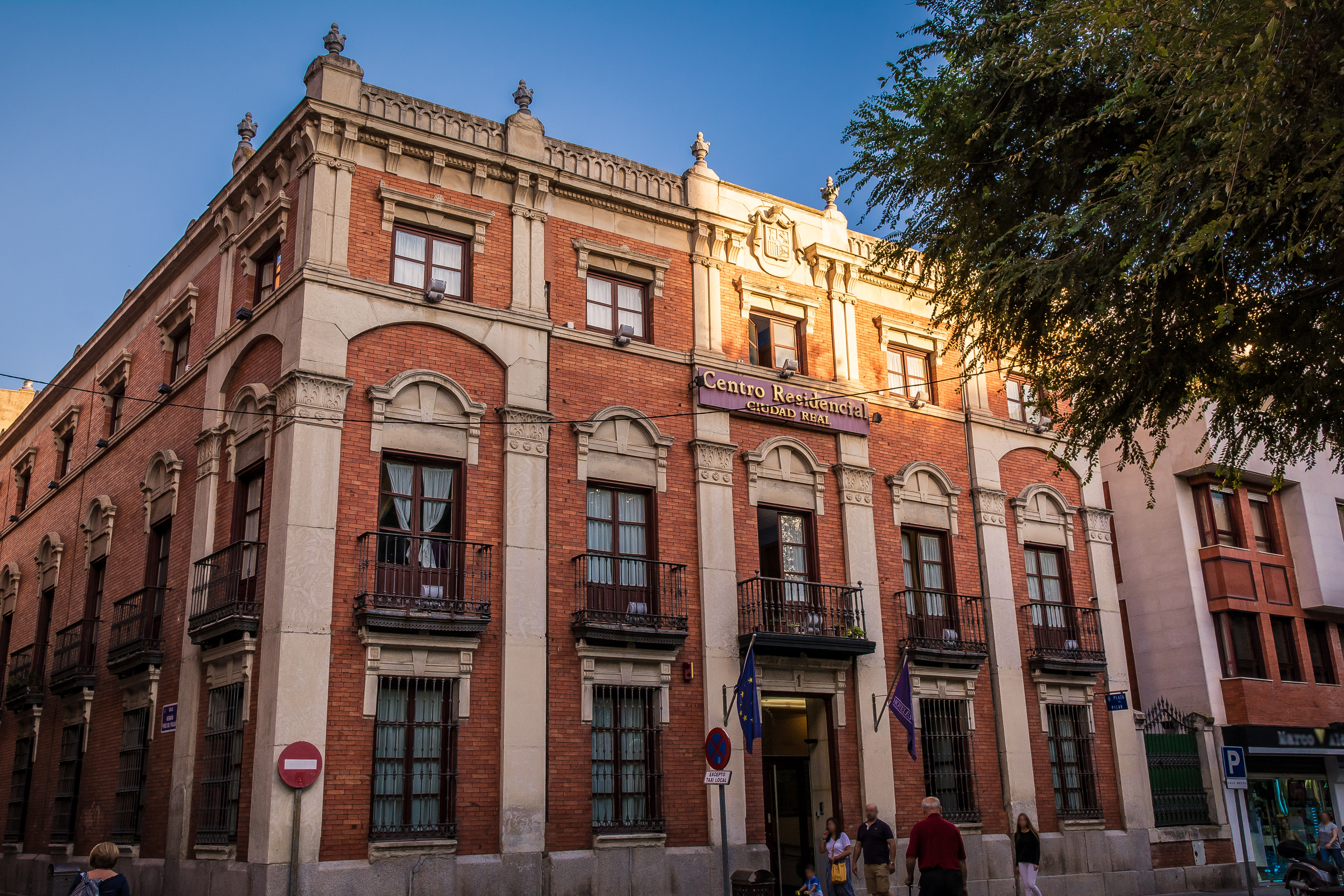
Old Bank of Spain building

The Plaza Mayor sits in the centre of Ciudad Real. Today, only two parts of the wall that surrounded the city in medieval times remain standing: The Toledo Gate.

Don Quixote's Museum is situated next to Parque de Gasset.

The Museo Elisa Cendreros exhibits an old collection of fans and carved wood.

The Ermita de Alarcos is the oldest church in Ciudad Real. The Iglesia of Santiago is also the most beautiful and oldest church in Ciudad Real, it was built at the end of the 13th century in romanic style. Its style is Gothic. It is decorated with gothic paintings and with seven-headed dragons, the ceiling is decorated with stones forming eight pointed stars.

Another important church in Ciudad Real is Iglesia de San Pedro (Church of Saint Peter). It is the most interesting and typical monument of the city. It was built during the 14th and 15th centuries. Its style is Gothic, and it houses the tomb of Chantre de Coca, confessor and chaplain of the Catholic Monarchs.

Ciudad Real Cathedral, built in the 16th century, has the second-largest nave in Spain and a magnificent Baroque altarpiece.

== Education ==
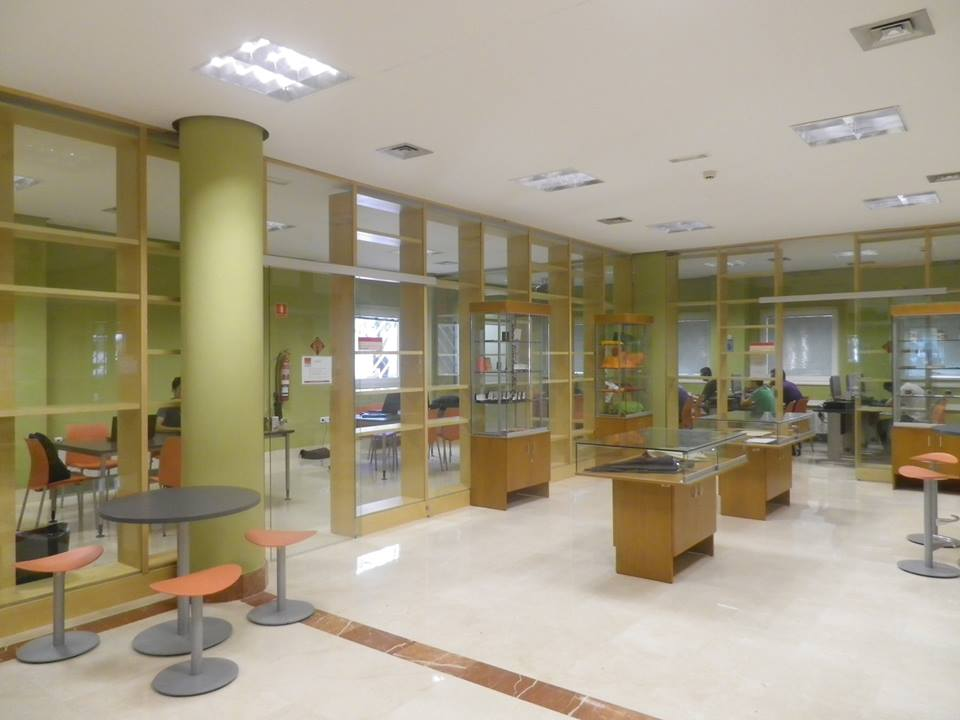
General library of the UCLM part of its Ciudad Real Campus

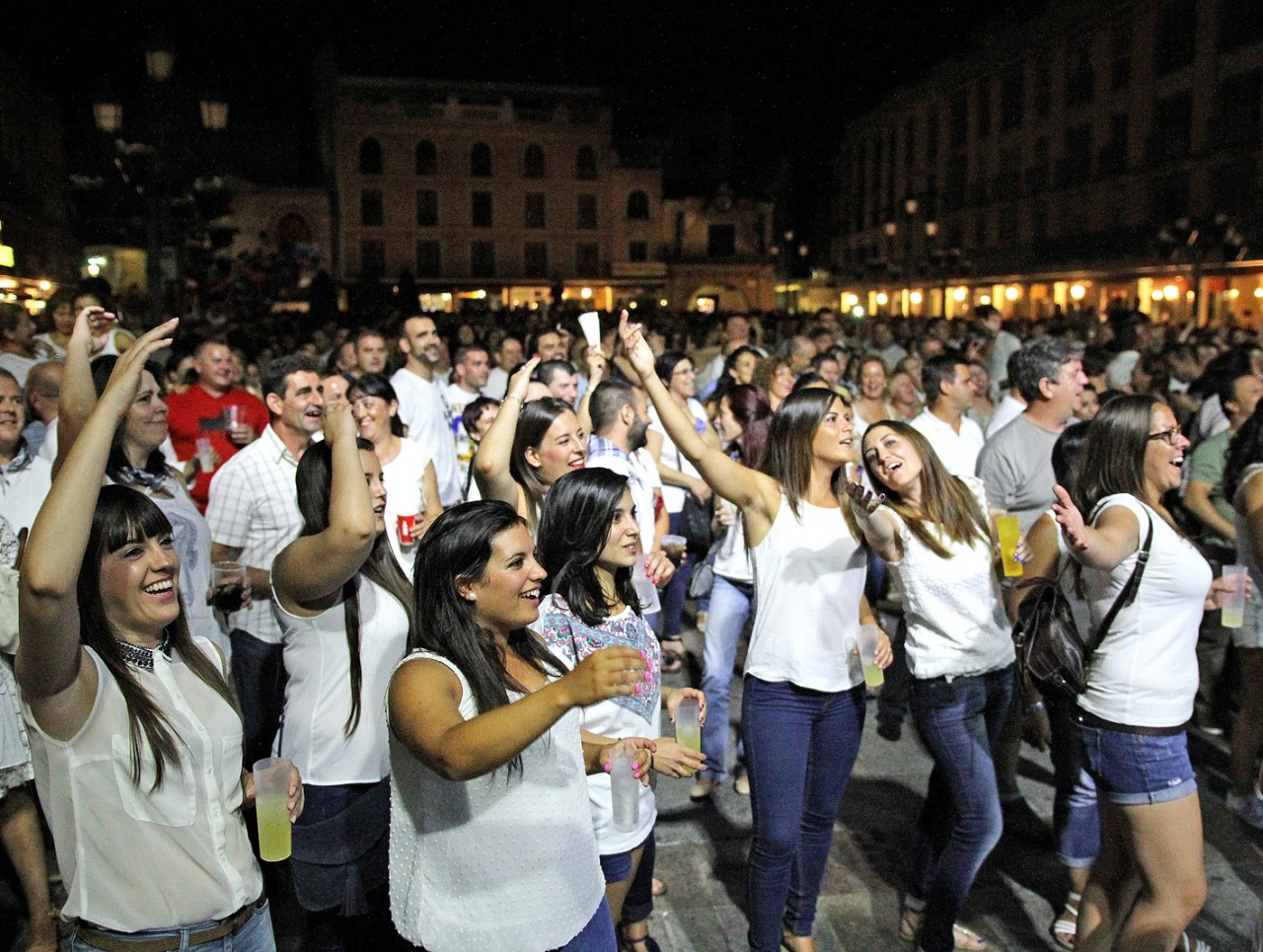
People during La Pandorga

Ciudad Real has 24 primary schools and 6 secondary schools.

The high school "Torreón del Alcázar" was founded in 1987. In the first years there were only vocational studies, thirty teachers and 350 students. Some years later the high school incorporated the compulsory secondary studies and A levels. At the moment there are 80 teachers and 1200 students. In the year 1995 the high school was offered the opportunity to become a bilingual school. In the year 2005 the first bilingual group arrived.

See University of Castilla–La Mancha (UCLM), Campus of Ciudad Real.

== Events ==
One of the most popular festivals in the city is La Pandorga, which takes place July 30 and 31. On the last day of the month the festival honours its patroness, La Virgen del Prado. The usual attire of the participants consists of jeans, a white shirt, and the traditional handkerchief.

== People ==
- Hernán Pérez del Pulgar (1451–1531), military captain who stood out during the Granada War
- Manuel Cáceres Artesero (1949–2025), known as "Manolo el del bombo", the most famous football fan in the world
- Manuel Marín (1949–2017), president of the Congress of Deputies and acting president of the European Commission
- José María Barreda (born 1953), former president of Castile–La Mancha
- Fernando Luna (born 1958), professional tennis player
- Juande Ramos (born 1954), former manager of Real Madrid Football Club
- Javier Botet (born 1977), horror actor with Marfan syndrome
- Jordi El Niño Polla (born 1994), pornographic actor
- Marcos Fis (born 2007), handball player

== See also ==
- Provincial Museum of Ciudad Real
