= José Díez de la Cortina y Olaeta =

Spanish politician

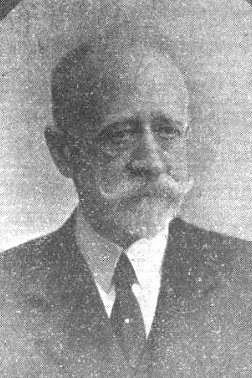
- Born: José Díez de la Cortina y Olaeta; 1856; Marchena
- Died: 1937 (aged 80–81); Madrid
- Occupations: Landowner, public servant
- Known for: Politician
- Political party: Carlism

José Díez de la Cortina y Olaeta, 2nd Count of la Cortina de la Mancha (1856–1937) was a Spanish politician and military. He is best known as leader of Andalusian Carlism and as member of the national party executive in the early 20th century. Having fought on the insurgent side during the Third Carlist War and as militia volunteer during the Philippine Revolution, in the Carlist army he rose to general de división; the Madrid government recognized him as comandante.

== Family and youth ==
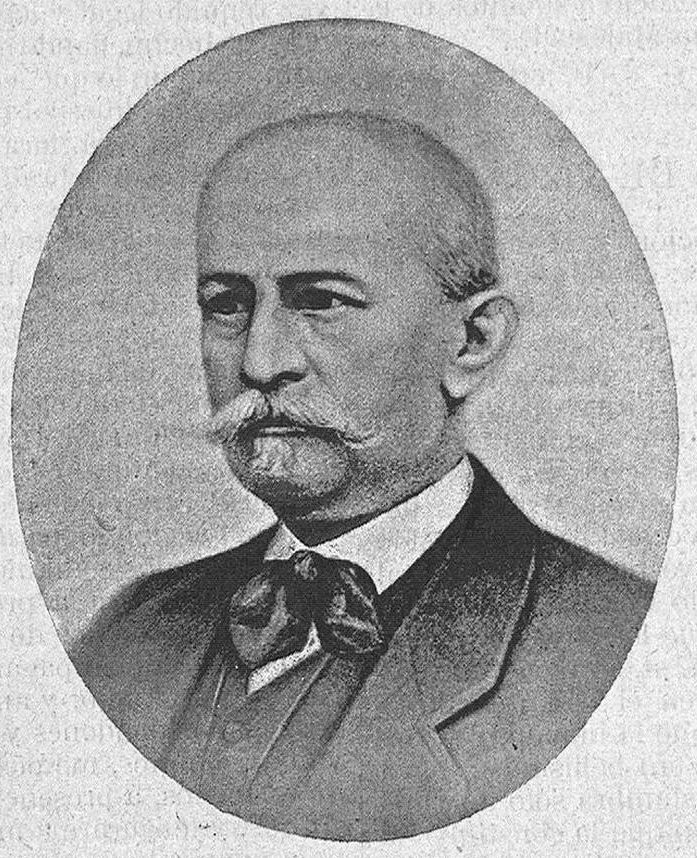
father

The Díez de la Cortina family originated from Cantabria, related to the town of Liébana; the first representative is noted in the 16th century. Modest members of the hidalguia, none of the family grew into a public figure until in the mid-18th century one of its branches moved to the Andalusian Marchena; they settled as arrendatarios in estates of Duque de Osuna. The great-grandfather of José, José Antonio Díez de la Cortina Gutiérrez, was born in the Cantabrian Potes and upon arrival in Marchena he built a house, which was later to become a family hub. José's grandfather, Juan Díez de la Cortina Layna Pernia (1782–1854), as the oldest surviving son became the family heir; in the 1830s he was already one of top local taxpayers. In the 1840s he formed part of the emerging "burguesía agraria", a group of local hidalgo families which grew into major proprietors as duque de Osuna was selling out his estates. Though not comparable to grand Andalusian landholders, they soon assumed leading role in the local agricultural regime.

The oldest son of Juan and the father of José, José Díez de la Cortina Cerrato (died 1874), owned some 400 ha and rented further 700 ha, which rendered him the 6th largest arrendatario in Marchena. At unspecified time he married Elena Olaeta Bouyon, a native of San Fernando; none of the sources consulted provides any information on her parentage, though she was probably descendant to two very distinguished Cádiz families of navy commanders and public servants; both the Olaetas and the Bouyons made their names in Spain and in the New World. José and Elena had three children, all of them sons, born between 1855 and 1859; José was born as the second oldest one.

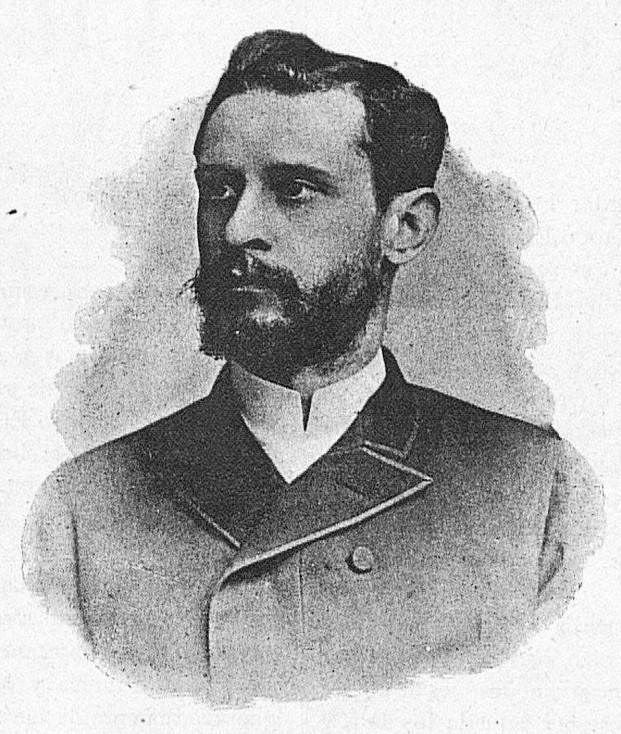
brother Rafael

Nothing is known about education of José. At unspecified time he married Carmen Torres Ternero, a local girl he was distantly related to as her great-grandmother descended from the Díez de la Cortina family; her grandfather, José de Torres Díez de la Cortina, was alcalde of Marchena and a cattle-breeder. The couple had no children. The best known relative of José Díez de la Cortina is his younger brother Rafael, who in the early 1880s migrated to the United States; in New York City he set up a language school which soon developed into a successful business; himself he became a pioneer of modern teaching of foreign languages, with a number of works published and Cortina Institute of Languages well operational until today. The Torres Díez de la Cortina relatives made their name developing the bull-breeding business and gained acknowledgement in the late 19th century. José's distant relative was José Gómez Acebo y Cortina, a conservative politician who held various ministerial jobs during final years of the Restoration. The Carlist title of Conde de la Cortina de la Mancha, conferred upon José's father in the 1870s, was recognized by the Madrid court in 2003 and currently rests with Mariano Ternero Caro.

== Civil War (1872-1876) ==
Carlist standard

There is no information on political preferences of the Díez de la Cortina family until the mid-19th century; in the 1860s various members of the family, including José Díez de la Cortina Cerrato, his wife and sons, started to appear as signatories of various open letters printed in Neo-Catholic and Carlist papers; they pledged loyalty to the Catholic Church and lambasted "corrupción de las ideas y de costumbres", especially in education. Later his son recollected that it was the 1868 revolution and its aftermath which triggered Díez de la Cortina Cerrato's access to Carlism; in 1870 he already declared his "completa adhesión al señor Duque de Madrid". When the Carlist insurgency rocked Vasco-Navarrese provinces in 1872 he pondered upon joining the rebels, the idea which soon became his obsession. In June 1873 the 17-year-old José was dispatched North to agree the logistics and learn the war craft; he left home for Cádiz, then sailed to Marseille, crossed the Pyrenees and in July joined the Carlist troops, nominated cadete and assigned to Regimente de Caballeria del Rey.

Throughout the summer of 1873 Díez de la Cortina took part in victorious campaign across central Navarre. In October he made it back to Marchena, where together with his father, both brothers, a cousin, few associates including a family chaplain, some servants and a handful of volunteers they formed a 20-men group, soon heading North. In two weeks they covered some 350 kilometers across the provinces of Córdoba, Jaén, Ciudad Real and Cáceres, finally joining the 300-men column of general Vicente Sabariegos.

with brothers and cousin

Surrounded by family members, starting November Cortina resumed combat during failed skirmishes at Retamosa; upon death of Sabariegos, command was assumed by general Villar y Perez. During late 1873 and early 1874 the group fought guerilla war across New Castile, Extremadura and La Mancha, engaged at Villar del Pedroso, Navahermosa, Montiel, Santa Cruz de los Cañamos, Talavera la Vieja (November), Torre del Campo (December), Puertollano, Los Yébenes, Talarrubias (January), Alcoba, Garbayela, Artiñano, Agudo, (February), Moral de Calatrava and Luciana (March). The campaign ended in April 1874 at Piedrabuena, when during close engagement he witnessed own father killed in action; his older brother perished during the same battle. The two brothers who survived the carnage – José wounded - made it to Portugal and from Lisbon sailed to Bordeaux, via Pau crossing to Carlist-controlled area in the North just on time to take part in last battles in Biscay. At unspecified time he was promoted to captain and assigned as adjutant to general Berriz. Promoted again to comandante, he took part in the 1875 battle of Lácar. During final months of the war the claimant rewarded Rafael with condado de Olaeta and confirmed condado de Cortina de La Mancha for José, who inherited the title from his late father; he was also promoted to teniente coronel and awarded a number of honors. They parted the claimant in Arneguy, the first French town on their way to exile.

== On exile and overseas (1876–1898) ==
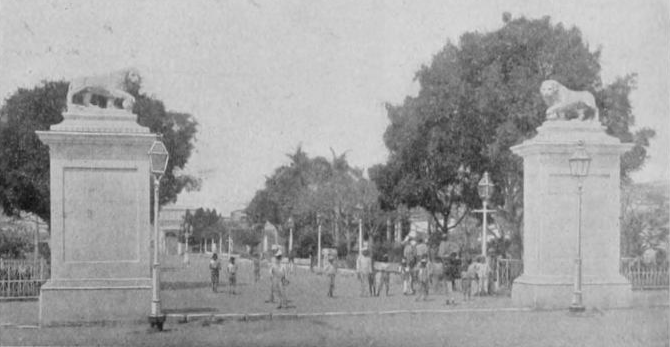
Cienfuegos, late 19th century

Once the Madrid government declared amnesty Cortina returned to Spain, though exact year remains obscure. There is no information on his fate during the early 1880s; he might have accompanied his younger brother when the latter settled in Mexico in 1879; one source claims he resided in Argentina. At unspecified time he took up residence in Cuba, most likely already as a civil servant. In 1884 he rose to secretary of gobernador in the province of Matanzas; some time afterwards though perhaps no later than in 1885 he moved to Cienfuegos, probably provisionally taking the job of local customs official. In early 1887 Cortina was transferred back to Matanzas, where he assumed the parallel post. His career in Cuba came to an abrupt end later that year, when officials of Ministerio de Hacienda discovered large quantities of gold and substantial sums of money missing. Though he was not charged with fraud and officially he was not even related to the scandal, in October Cortina was dismissed, later called back to La Habana and soon got his license temporarily suspended.

At unspecified time in the late 1880s Cortina left Cuba; in 1889 he was no longer counted among officials of Ministerio de Hacienda. In 1890 he was noted back in Spain, residing in his native Marchena. His spell there did not last long, as in the early 1890s Cortina resumed his civil servant career. Instead of Ministerio de Hacienda this time he was employed by Ministerio de Ultramar, nominated auxiliar de la secretaria del ministerio. He was dispatched to another of Spanish overseas territories, the Philippines; neither the date nor exact assignment is known. In 1895 Cortina was nominated jefé de administración de cuarta clase de la Dirección General de Administración de Filipinas.

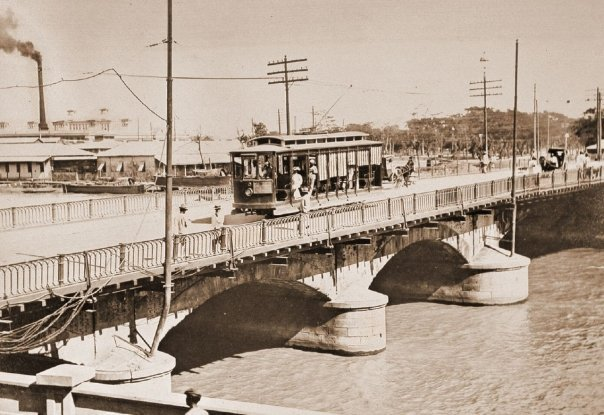
Manila, 1890s

Upon outbreak of the Philippine Revolution in 1896 Cortina initially remained in Manila. In September he joined Escuadron de Voluntarios, a cavalry militia unit. Since the squadron did not form part of regular army, its officers were elected; he was chosen teniente ayudante. The squadron initially performed patrol duties in endangered boroughs of Manila like Santa Mesa and Balic-Balic in Sampaloc district, Loma and Gagalanging in Santa Cruz and in Tondo; their tasks covered also vigilance at main bridges in San Fernando de Dilao and Malate. At later stage the cavalry escorted convoys to besieged pockets of Spanish resistance like Parañaque. In November 1986 Díez was assigned to operations in Cavite and fought at Binakayan-Dalahican. At unspecified time and at own request he was transferred to 2. Brigade of general José Marina Vega, engaged in southern provinces of Luzon at least until the battle of Presa Molino in March 1897. His bravery in action earned Cortina a number of military awards and promotion to captain, but his last months in the Philippines are not clear. The 1898 official annual listed him as secretary of Comisión Superior de Instrucción Primaria on the islands, but in January 1898 he was released from administration and later that year returned to Spain.

== Back in Andalusia (1899–1915) ==
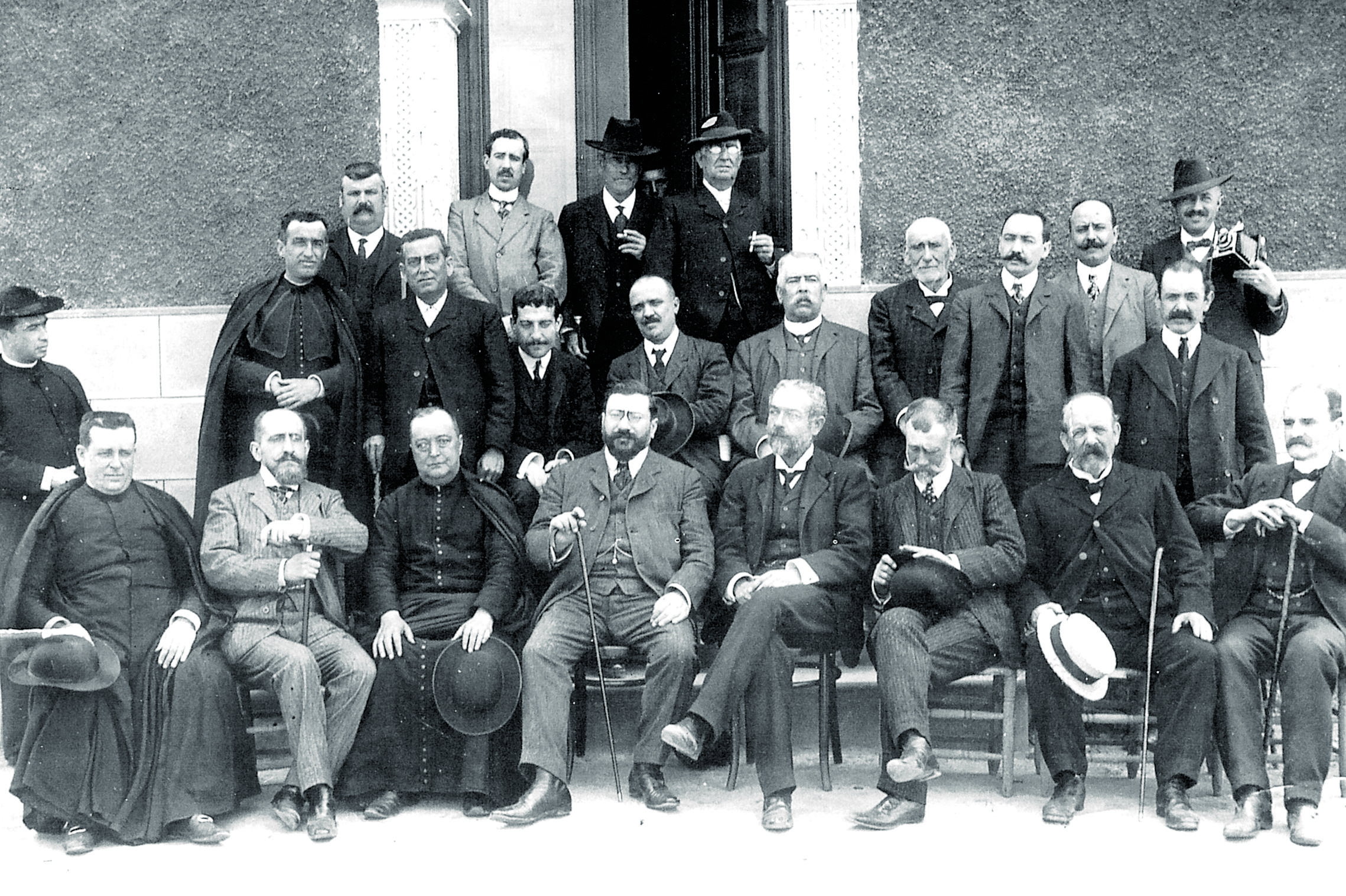
Díez de la Cortina with the prominent Carlist figure Juan Vázquez de Mella in Dos Hermanas (1906)

Cortina settled back in Marchena, assuming what was left of once large estate of his father. It is not known whether it was expropriated as repressive anti-Carlist measure or - during 20 years of his absence - divided among the relatives; in the press his economy was referred to "hacienda de Porcun". He immediately resumed Carlist activity and in 1899 entered the Sevilla Junta Provincial, soon growing to its vice-president. His engagement in gear-up to a Carlist uprising, planned at that time, is unclear. None of the sources treating the subject mentions his name, while a single but highly reliable work claims he remained actively involved and as a reward the claimant promoted him to general; most other authors suggest the promotion acknowledged his wartime Philippine advantages.

Little is known of Cortina's contribution to the legitimist cause in the early 1900s, except that he entertained national Carlist leaders visiting Andalusia and himself travelled to Venice to see Carlos VII. He remained adamant in public and got expulsed from the Seville agricultural organization for his vehemently hostile stand towards Alfonso XIII. In 1907 he was rumored to run for the Cortes from Seville, but the news proved false. In 1909 he visited Melilla and the same year he travelled to Venice again, this time to attend the funeral of his king and to welcome the new claimant, Don Jaime, who promoted him to general de división. Also in 1909 Cortina appeared already as regional leader of the Andalusian Carlism; exact year of his nomination is not clear.

Feliú unveiling monument of Francisco Alvarado

Given scarce support for Carlism in Andalusia the regional party structures were rather skimpy; Cortina threw himself into organizational work, building local juntas, youth circles, female sections and requeté units. In 1910 he launched El Radical, a periodical initially based in Dos Hermanas to move later to Marchena and finally to Jérez de la Frontera, and tried to mobilize support by organizing contests and semi-scientific conferences. Double hatting as jefe provincial in Seville he negotiated coalition candidates during elections, yet his intransigent stand prevented understanding with right-wing Catholic groupings and in 1911 he recommended abstention.

The climax of Cortina's Andalusian efforts fell in 1912, when as counter-celebration to official centenary of liberal Cádiz constitution he mounted commemoration honoring an anti-Cádiz thinker, Francisco Alvarado, a native of Marchena. The municipality was already turned into a Carlist hotbed; in April a number of Carlist political heavyweights including the party leader Feliú descended upon the town, the sequence of 2-day celebrations crowned with unveiling of Alvarado's monument. Cortina, a rather back-row party figure nationwide, enjoyed his days of glory, noted in Carlist papers across the country. In 1913 he was nominated to the newly formed national executive and entered its organization and financial committees, temporarily heading also the Extremadura party branch; in 1914 he was even noted on a unique trip beyond Andalusia. The apogee did not last long; in 1915 he ceased as regional jefe and as a result he also fell off Junta Nacional.

== Madrid (after 1915) ==
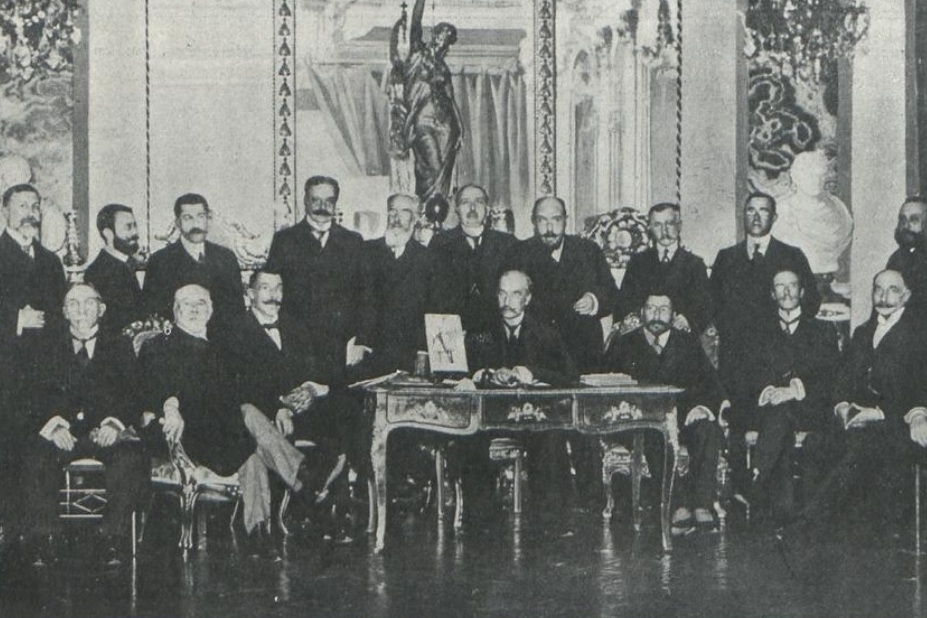
with Carlist executives, Madrid

None of the sources consulted clarifies why Cortina left the regional jefatura. At the time Carlism was divided into supporters of de Mella and those standing by the claimant, but in historiography he is only marginally mentioned as a somewhat disoriented Mellista sympathizer. It seems that the circumstances were strictly personal. Third Carlist War broke the back of the family; while other Marchena representatives of "burguesia agraria" kept growing into wealth, Cortina struggled. Turning 60 and with health problems, he concluded that he would be better off on the state payroll possibly earning a pension and perhaps assumed that moving to Madrid would facilitate his return to public service. Starting 1917 he was already noted as resident of the capital. As Ministerio de Ultramar no longer existed he knocked at the doors of Ministerio de Hacienda and got finally restored as 3. class administrative official in Ministerio de Fomento, success probably conditioned by distant family ties.

Though no longer holding high party jobs, in the capital Cortina was more exposed to big politics. He mixed with Madrid-resident Traditionalist leaders and royal figures, e.g. entertaining princess Beatriz in 1918. His call to create militia protecting religious establishments in wake of social unrest of late 1918 and early 1919 briefly gained him attention in the Cortes. When the conflict between de Mella and Don Jaime exploded into a full-scale confrontation in 1919, Cortina decided to side with the rebels. However, he was scarcely involved either in internal struggle or later in buildup of the new secessionist organization; in the early 1920s he rather withdrew from politics, attending only vaguely related gatherings. This was the case also following the Primo de Rivera coup of 1923; somewhat sympathetic to Somatén he stayed clear of politics and limited himself to posthumous homages to de Mella. Until 1927 Cortina was listed on various assignments within Ministerio de Fomento.

at Quintillo

In the early 1930s Cortina returned to Carlist loyalty by joining Comunión Tradicionalista; moderately exposed in propaganda as a veteran figure, he was noted as sitting in minor decorative bodies rather than engaged in real-life politics. Another moment of glory came on April 15, 1934, when he was invited to take part in massive gathering of Andalusian Carlists at Quintillo. Overwhelmed by the picture of 650 uniformed and trained requetés on field practice, the 78-year-old cried and declared the day "the happiest in his life". One of few alive officers from the Third Carlist War, in the mid-1930s Cortina ascended to president of Asociación de Veterano, engaged in mutual assistance program of the Carlist elderly and occasionally presided over party feasts; the last one noted took place in March 1936. Upon outbreak of the Civil War he was seized and detained in the Modelo prison. It is not clear how much time he spent behind bars; he survived workers’ militias raiding the prison and executing the prisoners. Cortina was released at unspecified time and died shortly afterwards as result of treatment he suffered when incarcerated.

== See also ==
- Traditionalism (Spain)
- Carlismo en Andalucía
