= Rafael Díez de la Cortina =

Spanish-American linguist

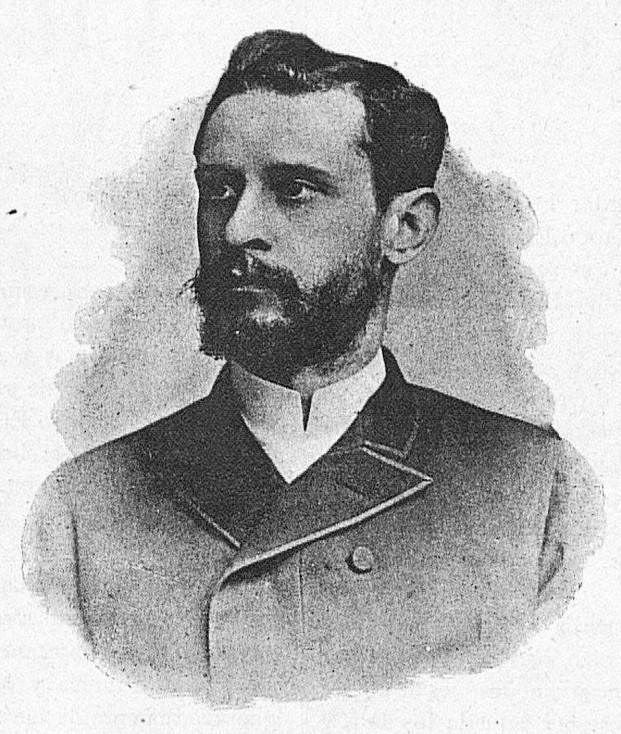
- Born: Rafael Díez de la Cortina y Olaeta; 1859; Seville
- Died: 24 July 1939 (aged 79–80); Middletown, New York
- Occupations: Linguist, publisher, entrepreneur
- Political party: Carlism
- Spouse(s): Marguerite Díez de la Cortina (her death); Marion L. M. Fletcher (1933-1939; his death)
- Parent(s): José Díez de la Cortina y Cerrato, Marqués de la Cortina; Elena Olaeta Bouyon

Signature
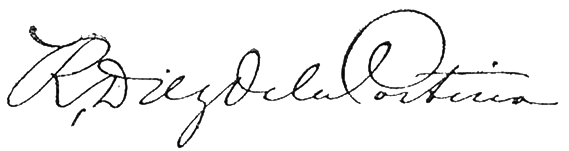

Rafael Díez de la Cortina y Olaeta, 1st Count of Olaeta (1859 – 24 July 1939) was a Spanish-American linguist. Globally, he is recognized as the first person to introduce sound recording into the teaching of foreign languages; he used it when operating his New-York-based company, Cortina Academy of Languages, launched in the 1890s. In Spain he is also known as a Carlist political activist and soldier; he volunteered to legitimist troops during the Third Carlist War and advanced the Carlist cause as the claimant's representative in America.

== Family and youth ==
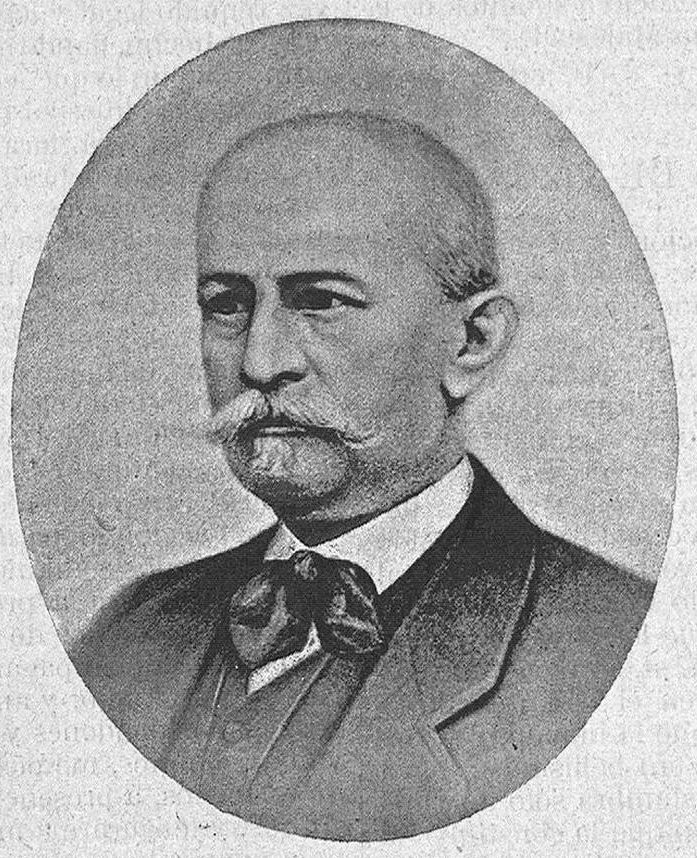
father

The Díez de la Cortina family originated from Cantabria and were related to Liébana; the first representative is noted in the 16th century. As part of hidalguia, none of the family members grew into a public figure until in the mid-18th century one of its branches moved to the Andalusian Marchena; they settled as arrendatarios in estates of Duque de Osuna.

Rafael's great-grandfather, José Antonio Díez de la Cortina Gutiérrez, was born in the Cantabrian Potes and upon his arrival in Marchena he built a house, which was later to become a family hub. Rafael's grandfather, Juan Díez de la Cortina Layna Pernia (born 1782), as the oldest surviving son, became the family heir. In the 1830s, he was already one of the top local taxpayers. In the 1840s, he formed part of the emerging "agrarian bourgeosie", a group of local hidalgo families which grew into major proprietors as duque de Osuna was selling out his estates. Although not comparable to grand Andalusian landholders, they soon assumed a leading role in the local agricultural regime.

brother Jose

The eldest son of Juan and the father of Rafael, José Díez de la Cortina Cerrato (died 1874), owned some 400 ha and rented further 700 ha; he was the 6th largest arrendatario in Marchena. At unspecified time he married Elena Olaeta Bouyon, a native of San Fernando, Cádiz; none of the sources consulted provides detailed information on her parentage; she was descendant to two very distinguished Cádiz families of navy commanders and public servants; both the Olaetas and the Bouyons made their names in Spain and in the New World. José and Elena had three children, all of them sons, born between 1855 and 1859; Rafael was the youngest one.

When in the United States he married twice: in 1897, to New York-born woman of Irish descent, Marguerite Canto Ingalis (1864-1933) Her father was reportedly named Timothy Canto and her mother was identified, variously, as Margaret Carr and as "Margt T. Flynn". Marguerite Díez de la Cortina was long engaged in local charity initiatives and set up Thimble Charity in Middletown, New York until her death in 1933. That year, Rafael married the Hartford, Connecticut-born Marion L. M. Fletcher (b. 1872). None of the sources consulted indicate he had any children and there were none mentioned as involved in property-related issues. He lived at various locations in New York, including at 431 Riverside Drive, in Manhattan, but the dates of residency are unclear. before moving to Middletown, New York.

In the early 1910s, his wife Marguerite was reported involved in local charity initiatives. In the mid-1930s, he was explicitly reported as living in Middletown, New York. On 24 July 1939, he died, reportedly from injuries sustained in an accident, at the Horton Hospital, Middletown, New York. He was buried at Woodlawn Cemetery in the Bronx. In 2017, the cemetery's website made a reference to him. The same site referred to him as a pioneer of self-improvement.

His older brother, José, in the early 20th century became a Carlist political leader in Andalusia and member of the national party executive. A distant relative was José Gómez Acebo y Cortina, a conservative politician who held various ministerial jobs during final years of the Restoration. The Carlist title of Conde de Olaeta, conferred upon Rafael in 1876, was claimed by Mariano Ternero Caro in 2002, but has not been recognized by the Madrid court so far. Some other relatives gained limited local recognition.

== Volunteer in Third Carlist War ==
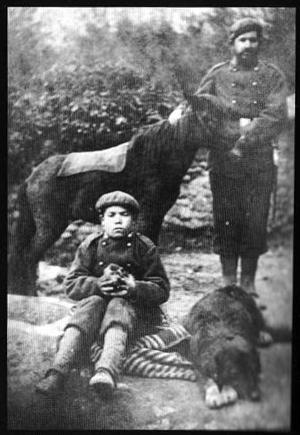
Carlist subjects, 1872

There is no information on political preferences of the Díez de la Cortina until the mid-19th century; in the 1860s various members of the family, including José Díez de la Cortina Cerrato, his wife and sons, started to appear as signatories of various open letters printed in Neo-Catholic and Traditionalist papers; they pledged loyalty to the Catholic Church and lambasted "corrupción de las ideas y de costumbres", especially in education. Later his son recollected that it was the 1868 revolution and its aftermath which triggered Díez de la Cortina Cerrato's access to Carlism; in 1870 he already declared his "completa adhesión al señor Duque de Madrid". When the Carlist insurgency rocked Vasco-Navarrese provinces in 1872 he pondered upon joining the rebels, the idea which soon became his obsession. In June 1873 the 17-year-old Rafael's brother José was dispatched North to agree the logistics and learn the war craft.

Upon his return to Marchena in October 1873 Cortina Cerrato formed a family-based group, consisting of the father, Rafael and his two brothers, his cousin, few family associates including a chaplain and a lawyer, some servants and a handful of volunteers. The 20-men unit, of which Rafael was the youngest member, headed North. In two weeks they covered some 350 kilometers across the provinces of Córdoba, Jaén, Ciudad Real and Cáceres, finally joining the 300-men column of general Vicente Sabariegos.

with brothers and cousin

Surrounded by family members, starting November Cortina commenced combat during failed skirmishes at Retamosa; upon death of Sabariegos, command was assumed by general Villar y Perez. During late 1873 and early 1874 the group fought guerilla war across New Castile, Extremadura and La Mancha, engaged at Villar del Pedroso, Navahermosa, Montiel, Santa Cruz de los Cañamos, Talavera la Vieja (November), Torre del Campo (December), Puertollano, Los Yébenes, Talarrubias (January), Alcoba, Garbayela, Artiñano, Agudo, (February), Moral de Calatrava and Luciana (March). The campaign ended in April 1874 at Piedrabuena, when during close engagement his father and the oldest brother Juan were killed in action.

The two brothers who survived, José (who was wounded), and Rafael (who had his horse shot) made it to Portugal and from Lisbon sailed to Bordeaux, in late spring of 1874 via Pau crossing to Carlist-controlled area in the North. While his older brother joined the cavalry, Rafael was assigned to artillery; as teniente serving initially in central Navarre under command of coronel Prada, later promoted to capitán he joined 2. Batería Montada of Atilano Fernández Negrete, forming part of the Vasco-Navarrese troops. It is not clear whether he served in the same unit throughout 1875. In early 1876, during final months of the war, the claimant rewarded Rafael with condado de Olaeta. At unspecified time he was promoted to comandante, though some sources claim he ended the campaign as teniente coronel. Reunited with his brother, they parted the claimant in Arneguy, the first French town on their way to exile.

== Carlist representative in America ==
Carlist standard

Cortina's early whereabouts on exile are obscure; 1878 latest he settled in Paris. In 1879 he "was sent" by his king to Mexico; no details are known. In 1881, he sailed from Mexico to New York and commenced teaching Spanish. Starting the 1880s he acted as representative of Carlos VII in North America.

He remained on good terms with the claimant, who wrote a recommendation letter published in the 1889 Cortina's language textbook. Naturalized in 1889, he visited Spain every few years; in 1895 Cortina extended his voyage to Venice, where he meet his king personally. Neither press of the era nor present-day historians explain exact nature of his activities prior to the late 1890s; one author notes that no tangible results of his political mission in the US are known.

Cortina was most active in 1896–98, during the run-up to the Spanish–American War. Busy in the Hispanic New York community and contributing to a daily Las Novedades, he tried to confront the anti-Spanish frenzy of American press and complained about lack of assistance on part of Madrid, the charges which thanks to Vázquez de Mella reached the Cortes and the government in 1896. Following a visit to Spain, starting 1897 Cortina changed the tone of his press endeavors; he switched to advertising the claims of Carlos VII. Thanks to his efforts few US periodicals, including New York Herald, published pieces on Carlism.

Some quoted Cortina as stating that 100,000 volunteers were awaiting an order to rise and that by January 1, 1898, Don Carlos would assume the throne, though also that the claimant would do nothing which might impair international standing of his country.

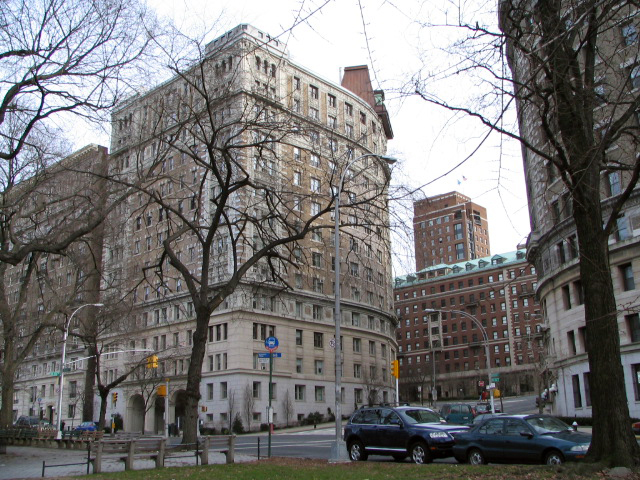
431 Riverside Drive (building left)

In May 1898, amid a virulent anti-Spanish press campaign, a number of papers quoted interviews with Cortina and discussed Carlist claims as proof that the Madrid government might fall any minute. Newspaper headlines and narration helped mobilize American public opinion, although this was not Cortina's intention. In May 1898, he transferred the realization of his prediction to June 1, 1898, called the Carlists of America to join the claimant and declared he would travel to Europe shortly.

It is unclear whether he did. One source claims vaguely that he "took part in the 1898-1899 conspiracy." He might have been involved in shipment of arms to Carlist conspirators, though nature of his engagement is highly unclear. In 1901, a Spanish military attaché in Washington reported to Madrid that Cortina helped him identify a cargo of 5,000 rifles, sent from New York to Lisbon and intended for a Carlist depot in Badajoz. It is not clear whether Cortina changed sides or he worked for the Carlists and for the Madrid government at the same time. During the 20th century, Cortina frequently visited Spain, at least in 1905, 1908, 1910, 1913, 1929, 1930, 1934, and 1935. While there, he used to give lectures on languages and was hardly reported as engaged in Carlist activities being focused on promoting his linguistic business. During a resurgence of Carlism in the 1930s he was not mentioned in party propaganda.

== Linguist and businessman ==
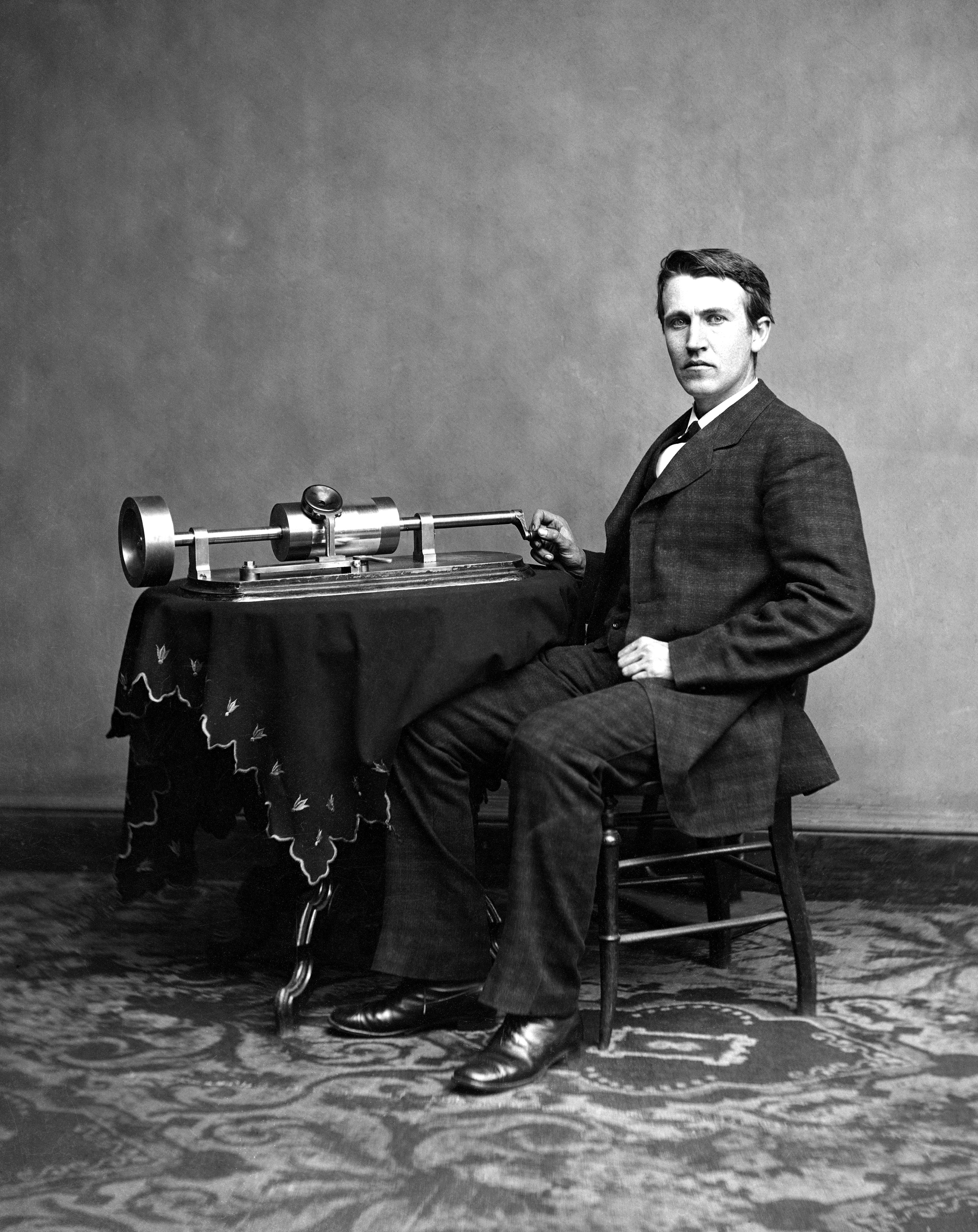
Edison and phonograph

Nothing certain is known about Rafael's education but, in the early 1880s, he began teaching Spanish. His own marketing and independent reviews alike claimed that Cortina Institute of Languages was set up in 1882. Throughout the 1880s, he was rather noted as giving lessons offered by other institutions, e.g. in 1887 by Brooklyn Library or in 1889 by Brooklyn YMCA. The breakthrough work which helped him launch own business was the 1889 publication titled The Cortina Method to Learn Spanish in Twenty Lessons.

Instead of systematically mastering linguistic structures, deemed laborious and inefficient, Cortina - claiming to be M.A. graduate of University of Madrid - focused on practical skills. In 1891 he was already boasting a program based on "the Cortina method", and in 1892 the Cortina School of Languages started to advertise. At the time he was running an established business already. Set in two locations in Brooklyn and Manhattan, the school offered 9 languages, taught in 20 lessons by native instructors.

It is not clear whether from the onset "the Cortina method" entailed mechanically-aided learning. Some claim that already in the mid-1880s Cortina experimented with phonograph recordings, possibly in co-operation with Thomas Edison. It was in 1893 that his method was reported in The Phonogram, an academic journal, and he became the first person to use phonograph for foreign language instruction. It soon became a second leg of his business, as on-site learning was paired with development of self-learning correspondence courses and production of related aid materials. They consisted of two types. One was own textbooks; they contained excerpts from literary works, though also phrases tailored for daily usage. Another one was recordings. Initially phonograph-intended cylinders were used; first branded by Cortina, after 1896 they were made by Edison's National Phonographic Company.

In 1908, he registered the trademark of Cortinaphone, selling own brand of phonograph, and since 1913 his company started to issue flat round recordings. The Cortina school kept using English for instruction until 1920, when they switched to target language only. Around 1920 he was marketing "Cortina phonograph outfit", advertised as more efficient than teaching by instructors.

Cortinaphone advert, 1910

Cortina's language business gained acknowledgement. His method of teaching was awarded corporate prizes; the school – since 1899 named Cortina Academy of Languages - made arrangements with prestigious New York colleges and had to rent bigger and bigger premises at prestigious downtown locations; other teaching institutions advertised themselves as adhering to his methodology; the publishing house he set up kept re-printing textbooks and manuals in endless editions while audio materials were published jointly with Columbia Records. Correspondence courses of English proved successful in South America and Mexico.

Cortina also developed business contacts in Spain and remained on good terms with education officials. His teaching method enjoyed largely positive reception among academics of that time; also contemporary scholars note that it "marks a great advance in language teaching". The language school he created was later renamed to Cortina Institute of Languages and was operational until June 2015.

== See also ==
- Carlism
- Traditionalism (Spain)
- Language education
- José Díez de la Cortina y Olaeta
- José Díez de la Cortina y Cerrato
- List of language self-study programs
