= Jesús de Miguel =

Spanish footballer (1996–2026)

- De Miguel with Castellón in 2024

Personal information
- Full name: Jesús de Miguel Alameda
- Date of birth: 21 September 1996
- Place of birth: Madrid, Spain
- Date of death: 3 November 2026 (aged 30)
- Place of death: Santa Cruz de Tenerife, Spain
- Height: 1.89 m (6 ft 2 in)
- Position: Striker

Youth career
- Lugo Fuenlabrada
- Leganés

Senior career*
Years	Team	Apps	(Gls)
2015–2016	Leganés B	3	(0)
2016–2017	Lugo Fuenlabrada	23	(14)
2017–2018	Internacional Madrid	16	(1)
2018–2019	Fuenlabrada	2	(0)
2019	→ Unión Adarve (loan)	2	(0)
2019–2021	Navalcarnero	44	(15)
2021–2023	Unionistas	53	(13)
2023–2025	Castellón	80	(23)
2025–2026	Tenerife	34	(11)
Total		257	(77)
- * Club domestic league appearances and goals

Jesús de Miguel Alameda (21 September 1996 – 3 November 2026) was a Spanish professional footballer who played as a striker.

De Miguel spent most of his career in the third-tier Segunda División B and Primera Federación, in which he made 149 appearances and scored 48 goals. He won promotion from the division with Castellón in 2024 and Tenerife in 2026 and represented both clubs in the Segunda División, in which he played 39 games and scored three goals.

== Early life ==
De Miguel was born in Madrid on 21 September 1996. His parents were from Navahermosa, Toledo, where de Miguel spent his childhood summers. He had a sister, Marta.

== Career ==
=== Early career ===
De Miguel represented Lugo Fuenlabrada and Leganés as a youth. After making his senior debut with the latter's reserves in the Preferente de Madrid, he returned to Lugo Fuenlabrada in 2016, and scored a career-best 14 goals in the campaign.

On 20 July 2017, de Miguel joined Tercera División side Internacional de Madrid. After helping in their promotion to Segunda División B, he moved to Fuenlabrada in that division on 18 July 2018.

In January 2019, after being rarely used at Fuenlabrada, de Miguel moved on loan to fellow third division side Unión Adarve until the end of the season. On 2 July, after just two appearances, he signed for Navalcarnero in the fourth tier.

De Miguel scored 11 goals for Navalcarnero in the 2019–20 campaign, as the club achieved promotion to division three. On 3 July 2021, after missing three months of the 2020–21 season due to injury, he left the club.

=== Unionistas ===
Hours after leaving Navalcarnero, de Miguel agreed to a deal with Primera División RFEF side Unionistas de Salamanca. He scored 12 goals in his first season at the club, as they missed out on the playoffs on the final day. In 2022–23, he was affected by injuries in the first half of the season, and scored once in 17 appearances.

=== Castellón ===
On 31 January 2023, de Miguel was transferred to fellow third division side Castellón, who were in second place. The fee was reported as €145,000 by Unionistas. He scored four goals in 11 matches for the rest of the league season, despite missing six consecutive games through injury; he added another two goals in the promotion playoffs as his team lost the final to Alcorcón.

De Miguel renewed his contract on 21 December 2023, to last until 2026. He was the top scorer of his group in the 2023–24 campaign, scoring 16 goals as the Orelluts achieved promotion to Segunda División.

De Miguel made his professional debut at the age of 27 on 17 August 2024, starting in a 1–0 away loss to Eibar. He scored his first professional goals on 16 September, with two in a 5–2 away win over Almeria, and finished the season with three goals from 34 games, mostly as a substitute as his team avoided relegation.

=== Tenerife ===
On 8 July 2025, de Miguel agreed to a three-year deal with Tenerife, recently relegated to the third division. He scored six goals in his first five matches, and finished the campaign with 11 goals as the club returned to division two at first attempt.

== Death ==
Floral tributes to de Miguel at the Estadio Heliodoro Rodríguez López

On 2 November 2026, de Miguel suffered a blunt cardiac injury in a collision with FC Andorra goalkeeper Jesús Owono which caused him to go into cardiac arrest. He was resuscitated while being transported to the University Hospital of Nuestra Señora de Candelaria in Santa Cruz de Tenerife, where he died the following day, aged 30. Owono was sent off after the collision, and police opened an investigation into a possible involuntary manslaughter charge. The homicide unit of the National Police Corps also opened an investigation into the protocols taken by the medical team that cared for de Miguel at the Estadio Heliodoro Rodríguez López. Owono was later handed a 12-match suspension by the Royal Spanish Football Federation (RFEF) on 13 November for the collision.

The RFEF postponed all games in the Copa del Rey and Copa de la Reina on the day of de Miguel's death. UEFA arranged a minute's silence before matches in its tournaments, several Spanish clubs cancelled training, and Espanyol postponed the presentation of their new manager. The Association of Spanish Footballers requested the postponement of all games from 3 to 9 November, but only the games of Tenerife, Castellón and Andorra were postponed at the weekend.

De Miguel and his partner María had a daughter in 2025. Following his death, Tenerife agreed to financially support her until her 18th birthday, while former Tenerife player Fran Sol began a crowdfunding campaign of over €150,000, and Burgos and Almería donated their income from games against Tenerife to the family.

Following de Miguel's death, the village of Navahermosa declared three days of official mourning. His funeral was held on 5 November at the Parish Church of Saint Michael the Archangel in Navahermosa. In addition to his Tenerife teammates, manager Álvaro Cervera, and president Felipe Miñambres, the funeral was also attended by Florentino Pérez, Luis de la Fuente, Emilio Butragueño, José Antonio Camacho, Aitor Karanka, Juan Manuel Asensi, José Ramón Alexanko, David Aganzo, Pablo Blanco, Miguel Ángel Gil Marín, and Rafael Louzán. Tenerife held a tribute for de Miguel at the Estadio Heliodoro Rodríguez López on 7 November.

== See also ==
- List of association footballers who died after on-field incidents
