= Miguel Boriba =

Equatoguinean footballer (born 1990)

Personal information
- Full name: Miguel Ángel Boriba Elembo
- Date of birth: 14 May 1990 (age 36)
- Place of birth: Malabo, Equatorial Guinea
- Height: 1.80 m (5 ft 11 in)
- Positions: Left-back; centre-back

Team information
- Current team: Móstoles URJC

Youth career
- 2002–2005: Arroyo
- 2005–2009: Getafe

Senior career*
Years	Team	Apps	(Gls)
2009–2010	Colmenar Viejo	22	(0)
2010–2011	Illescas	13	(0)
2011–2014	Lugo Fuenlabrada	91	(7)
2014–2016	Colonia Moscardó	62	(4)
2016–2017	Atlético Pinto	36	(1)
2017–2018	Internacional de Madrid	10	(0)
2018–2020	Carabanchel	49	(2)
2020–2021	El Álamo	27	(6)
2021–2022	Pozuelo de Alarcón	35	(3)
2022–2024	Torrejón	37	(6)
2024–	Móstoles URJC	0	(0)

International career^{‡}
2010	Equatorial Guinea U-20	1	(0)
2011	Equatorial Guinea U-23	2	(0)
2009–2015	Equatorial Guinea	7	(0)
- * Club domestic league appearances and goals as of 12 May 2024 ‡ National team caps and goals as of 15 November 2015

Miguel Ángel Boriba Elembo (born 14 May 1990) is an Equatoguinean footballer who plays as a defender for Segunda Federación club Móstoles URJC. He capped for the Equatorial Guinea national team. He also holds Spanish citizenship.

== International career ==
Boriba played with the Equatorial Guinea national team in a friendly match against Cape Verde on 28 March 2009, and again against Estonia on 6 June 2009. He was also part of the Equatoguinean team in the Mundialito de la Inmigración y la Solidaridad 2010 tournament in Madrid, Spain.
