= Agudo =

Agudo may refer to:

- Agudo, Rio Grande do Sul, Brazil
- Agudo, Ciudad Real, Spain
