= Moral de Calatrava =

- Municipality
- Coat of arms

- Location in Spain
- Coordinates: 38°52′59″N 3°43′0″W
- Country: Spain
- Autonomous community: Castile-La Mancha
- Province: Ciudad Real
- Comarca: Campo de Calatrava

Government
  - Alcalde: Manuel Torres Estornell (2015) (People's Party)
- Elevation: 671 m (2,201 ft)

Population (2025-01-01)
  - Total: 5,184
- Demonym: Moraleño/a
- Time zone: UTC+1 (CET)
  - Summer (DST): UTC+2 (CEST)
- Postal code: 13350
- Website: Official website

Moral de Calatrava is a municipality in Ciudad Real, Castile-La Mancha, Spain. It is a municipality within the Order of Calatrava in 1212.

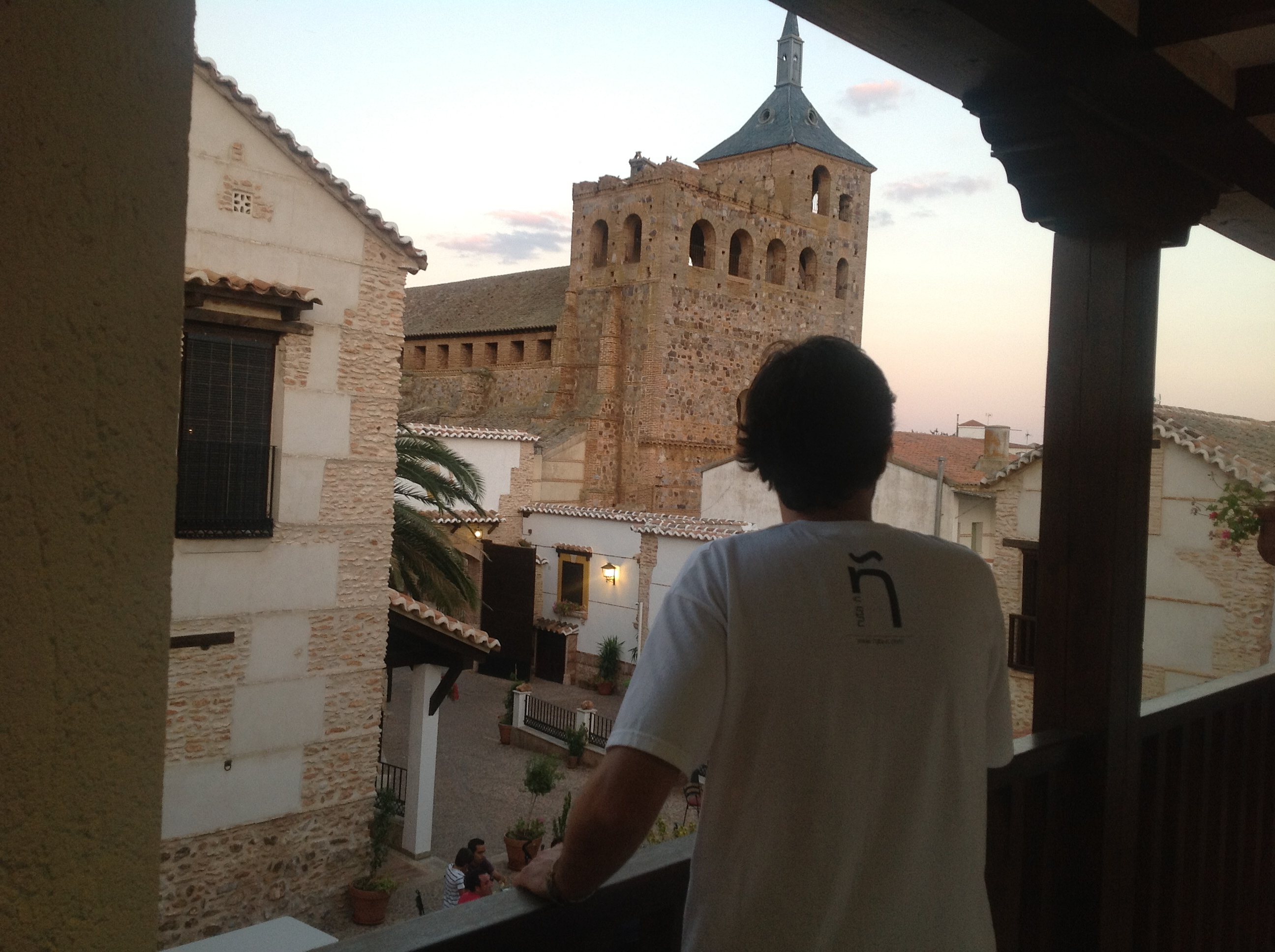
Moral de Calatrava is member of the cultural programme Ruta Ñ to promote the Spanish language and culture. Photo: Students of Spanish in the "Iglesia San Andrés Apostol" (Moral de Calatrava).
