= CD Fuenlabrada Atlantis =

Spanish football club

Fuenlabrada Atlantis
- Full name: Club Deportivo Fuenlabrada Atlantis
- Founded: 1995 (Lugo Fuenlabrada); 2019 (Fuenlabrada Atlantis); 2024 (merger)
- Ground: El Naranjo
- Capacity: 1,000
- President: Ismael González
- Manager: Alex Martínez
- League: Preferente de Aficionados – Group 4
- 2025–26: Primera de Aficionados – Group 4, 1st of 18 (champions)
- Website: fuenlatlantis.es
Home colours	Away colours

Club Deportivo Fuenlabrada Atlantis is a Spanish football club based in Fuenlabrada, in the Community of Madrid. Founded in 1995, the club play in the Preferente de Aficionados – Group 4.

== History ==
Founded in 1995 as Club Deportivo Lugo, the club was renamed Club Deportivo Elemental Lugo Fuenlabrada in 2007, and achieved a first-ever promotion to Tercera División in 2015. The club was relegated after just one season, and suffered another relegation from the Preferente de Madrid in 2023.

In 2024, Lugo Fuenlabrada was absorbed by Fuenlabrada Atlantis, a club founded in 2019 by college students of the King Juan Carlos University and mainly focused on youth football. Atlantis immediately took their place in the Primera Aficionados, and achieved promotion to the Preferente as champions in 2026.

== Season-to-season ==
=== Lugo Fuenlabrada ===
Season	Tier	Division	Place	Copa del Rey
1999–2000	8	3ª Reg.	4th	
2000–01	7	2ª Reg.	11th	
2001–02	7	2ª Reg.	13th	
2002–03	7	2ª Reg.	14th	
2003–04	7	2ª Reg.	15th	
2004–05	7	2ª Reg.	5th	
2005–06	7	2ª Reg.	1st	
2006–07	6	1ª Reg.	4th	
2007–08	6	1ª Reg.	6th	
2008–09	6	1ª Reg.	7th	
2009–10	6	1ª Afic.	3rd	
2010–11	5	Pref.	9th	
2011–12	5	Pref.	5th	

Season	Tier	Division	Place	Copa del Rey
2012–13	5	Pref.	11th	
2013–14	5	Pref.	7th	
2014–15	5	Pref.	2nd	
2015–16	4	3ª	19th	
2016–17	5	Pref.	4th	
2017–18	5	Pref.	4th	
2018–19	5	Pref.	5th	
2019–20	5	Pref.	7th	
2020–21	5	Pref.	10th	
2021–22	6	Pref.	7th	
2022–23	6	Pref.	18th	
2023–24	7	1ª Afic.	16th	

- 1 season in Tercera División

=== Fuenlabrada Atlantis ===
Season	Tier	Division	Place	Copa del Rey
2022–23	9	3ª Afic.	1st	
2023–24	8	2ª Afic.	5th	
2024–25	8	1ª Afic.	4th	
2025–26	8	1ª Afic.	1st	
2026–27	7	Pref. Afic.		
