= Artiñano =

Artiñano is a surname of Basque origins. Notable people with the surname include:

- Javier Artiñano (1942–2013), Spanish costume designer
- Rocío Abreu Artiñano (born 1974), Mexican politician
