= Piedrabuena =

- Municipality
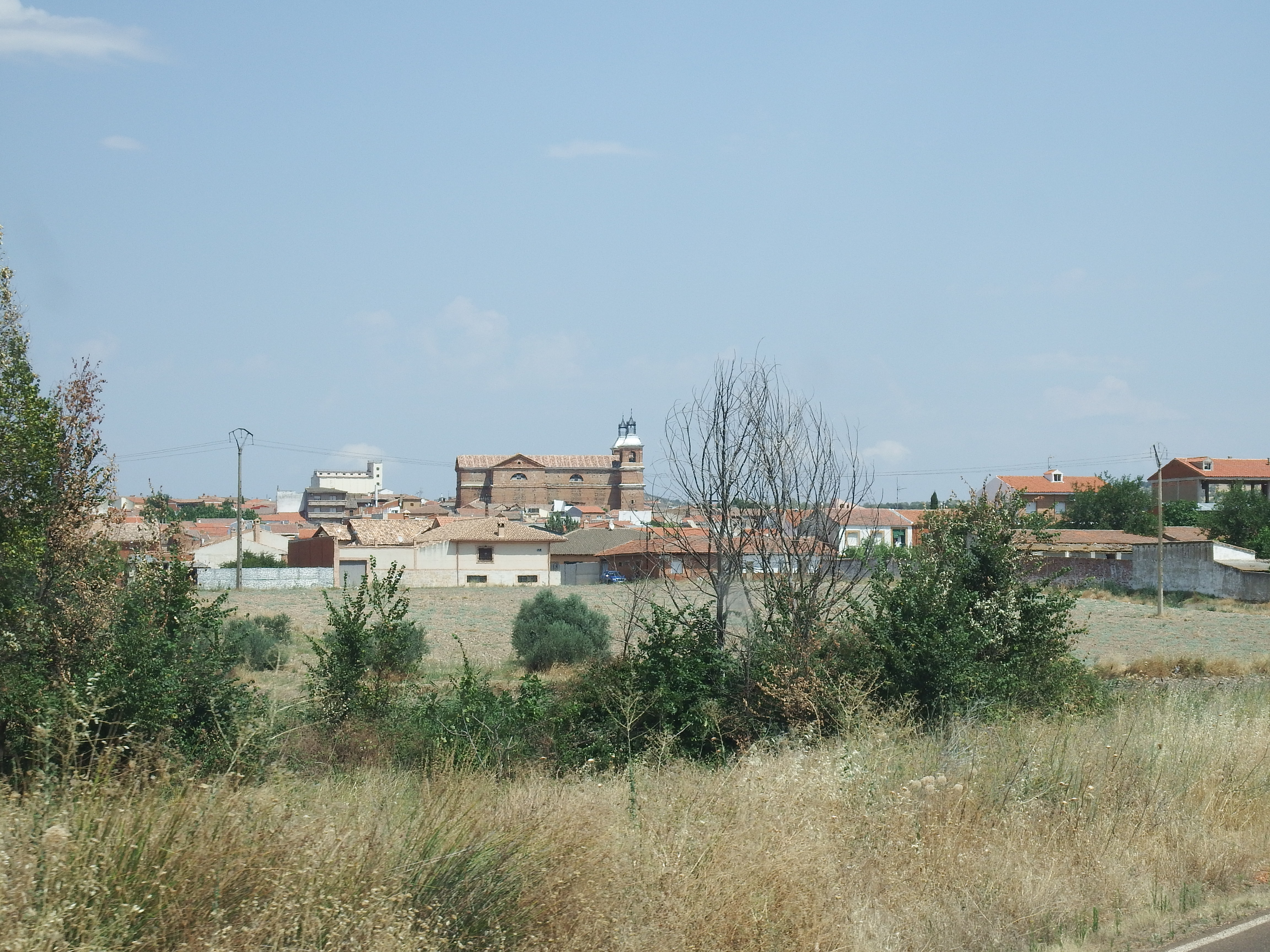
- View of Piedrabuena

- Flag Coat of arms

- Location of Piedrabuena in Spain. Piedrabuena (Castilla-La Mancha)
- Coordinates: 39°02′N 4°10′W
- Country: Spain
- Autonomous Community: Castile-La Mancha
- Province: Ciudad Real
- Comarca: Campo de Calatrava

Government
  - Mayor: José Luis Cabezas (PSOE)

Area
  - Total: 565.36 km^{2} (218.29 sq mi)

Population (2024)
  - Total: 4,352
  - Density: 7.698/km^{2} (19.94/sq mi)
- Demonym: Piedrabuenero/a
- Time zone: UTC+1 (CET)
  - Summer (DST): UTC+2 (CEST)
- Postal code: 13100
- Website: piedrabuena.es

Piedrabuena is a municipality in Ciudad Real, Castile-La Mancha, Spain. It has a population of 4,352.
