= Santa Cruz de los Cáñamos =

Spanish municipality

Coordinates: 38°38′16″N 2°52′6″W

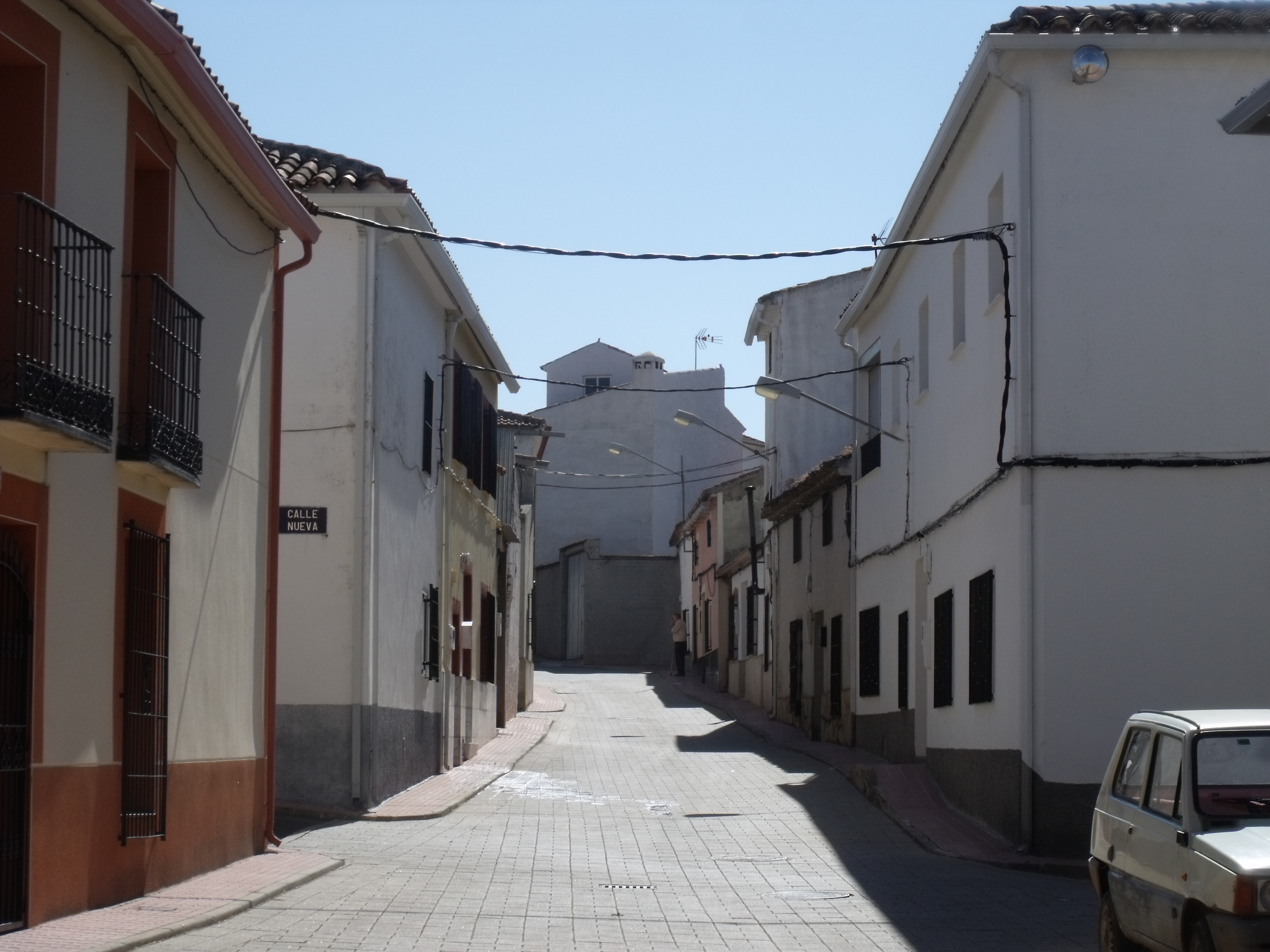
Streets of SCC

Flag of Santa Cruz de los Cáñamos

Coat of arms of Santa Cruz de los Cáñamos

Santa Cruz de los Cáñamos (also called SCdlC or simply SCC) is a municipality located in the province of Ciudad Real, Castile-La Mancha, Spain. It has a population of 554 (2014).

== Mayor ==
Isidro Sánchez became the first blind mayor of Spain, with 229 votes in favor, and 183 against.
