= Alcoba =

Coordinates: 39°15′39″N 4°28′36″W

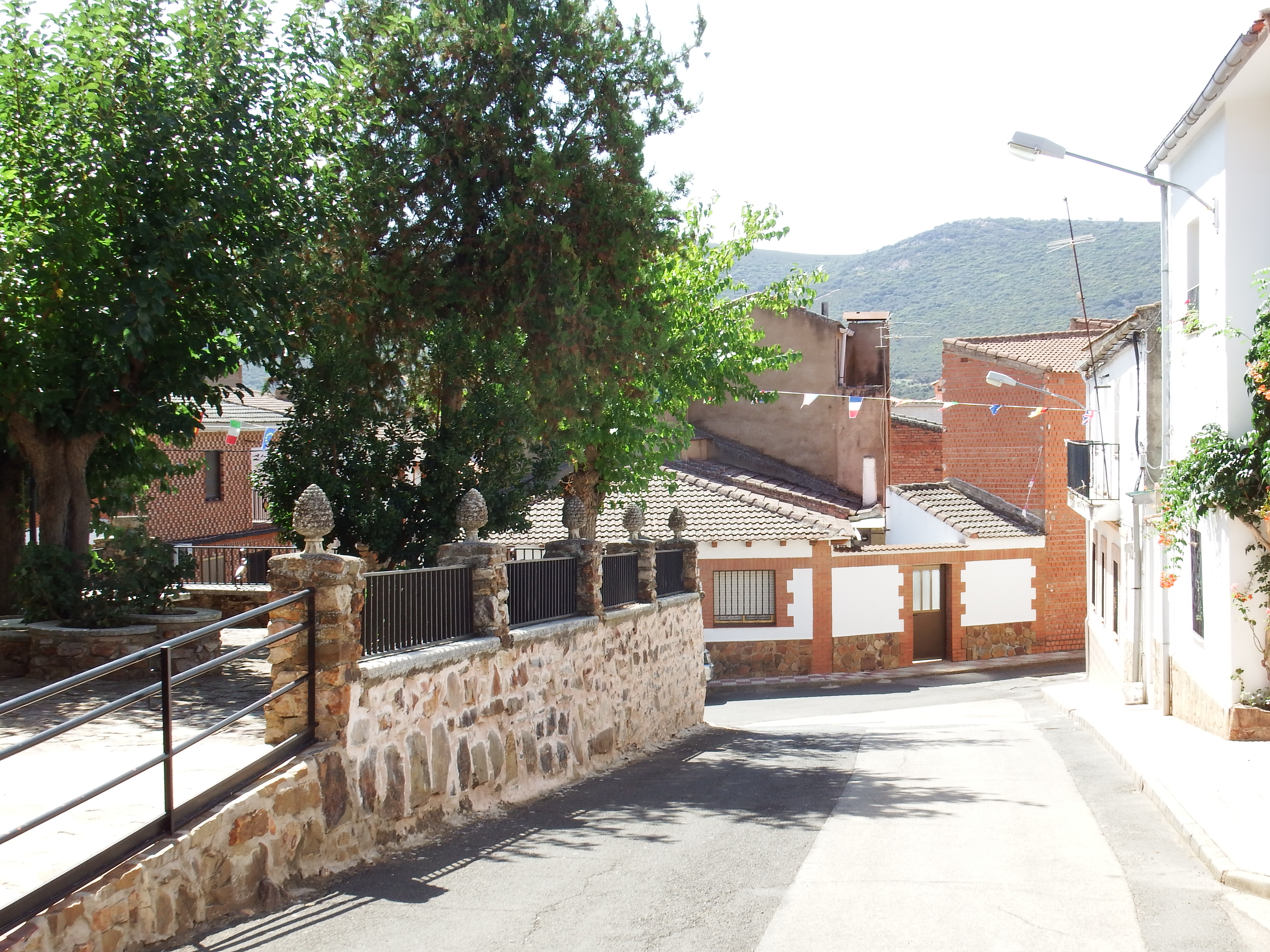
Street of Alcoba

Flag of Alcoba

Coat of arms of Alcoba

Alcoba is a municipality located in the province of Ciudad Real, Castile-La Mancha, Spain. It has a population of 639 (2014).
