= Talarrubias =

Coordinates: 39°02′N 5°14′W

- municipality
- Flag Coat of arms
- Interactive map of Talarrubias
- Country: Spain
- Autonomous community: Extremadura
- Province: Badajoz

Area
  - Total: 120 km^{2} (46 sq mi)
- Elevation: 435 m (1,427 ft)

Population (2025-01-01)
  - Total: 3,251
  - Density: 27/km^{2} (70/sq mi)
- Time zone: UTC+1 (CET)
  - Summer (DST): UTC+2 (CEST)
- Website: http://www.talarrubias.org

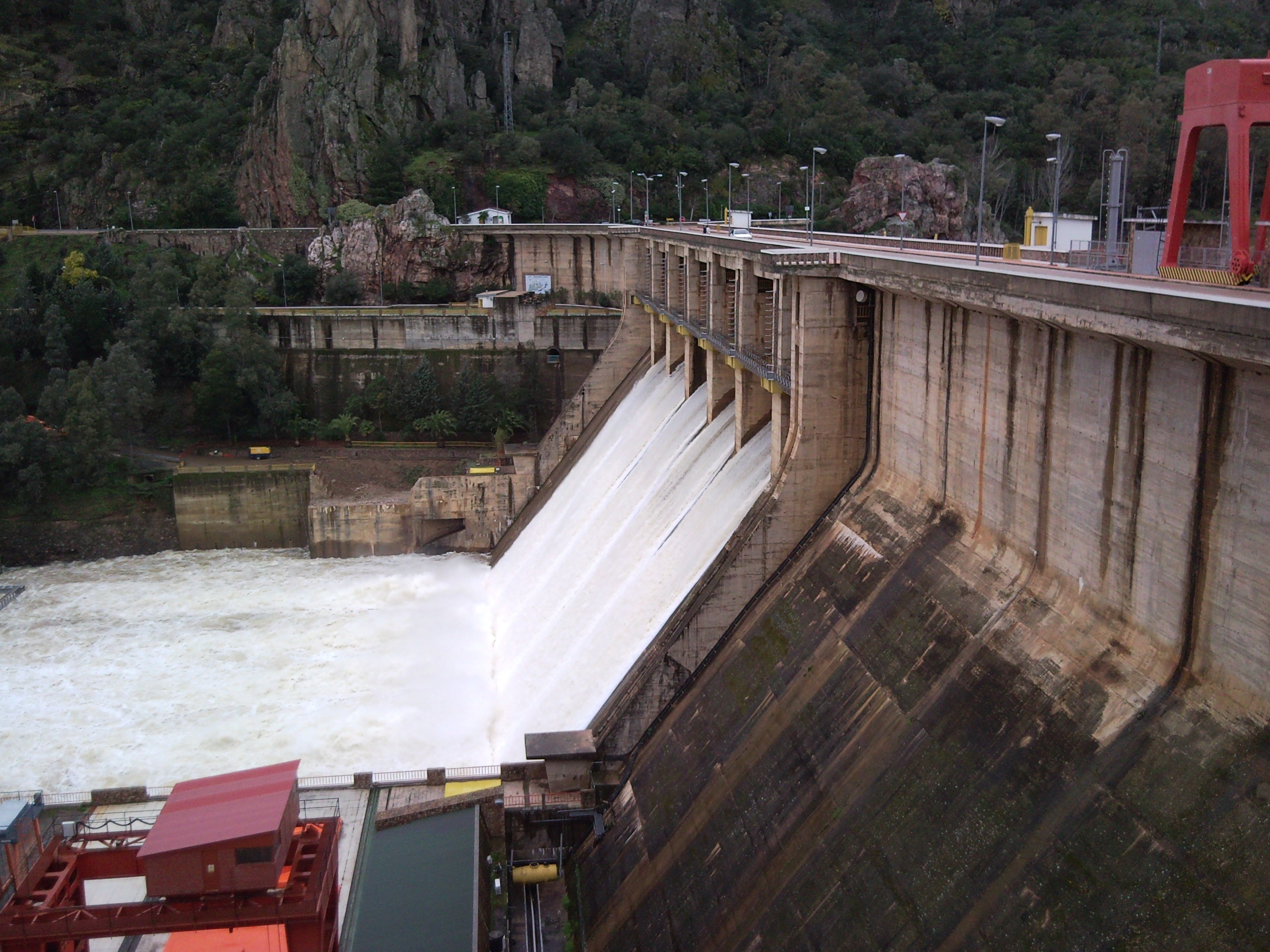
A dam in Talarrubias

Talarrubias is a municipality located in the province of Badajoz, Extremadura, Spain. According to the 2005 census (INE), the municipality has a population of 3216 inhabitants.

== See also ==
- List of municipalities in Badajoz
