= Agudo, Ciudad Real =

Coordinates: 38°59′N 4°52′W

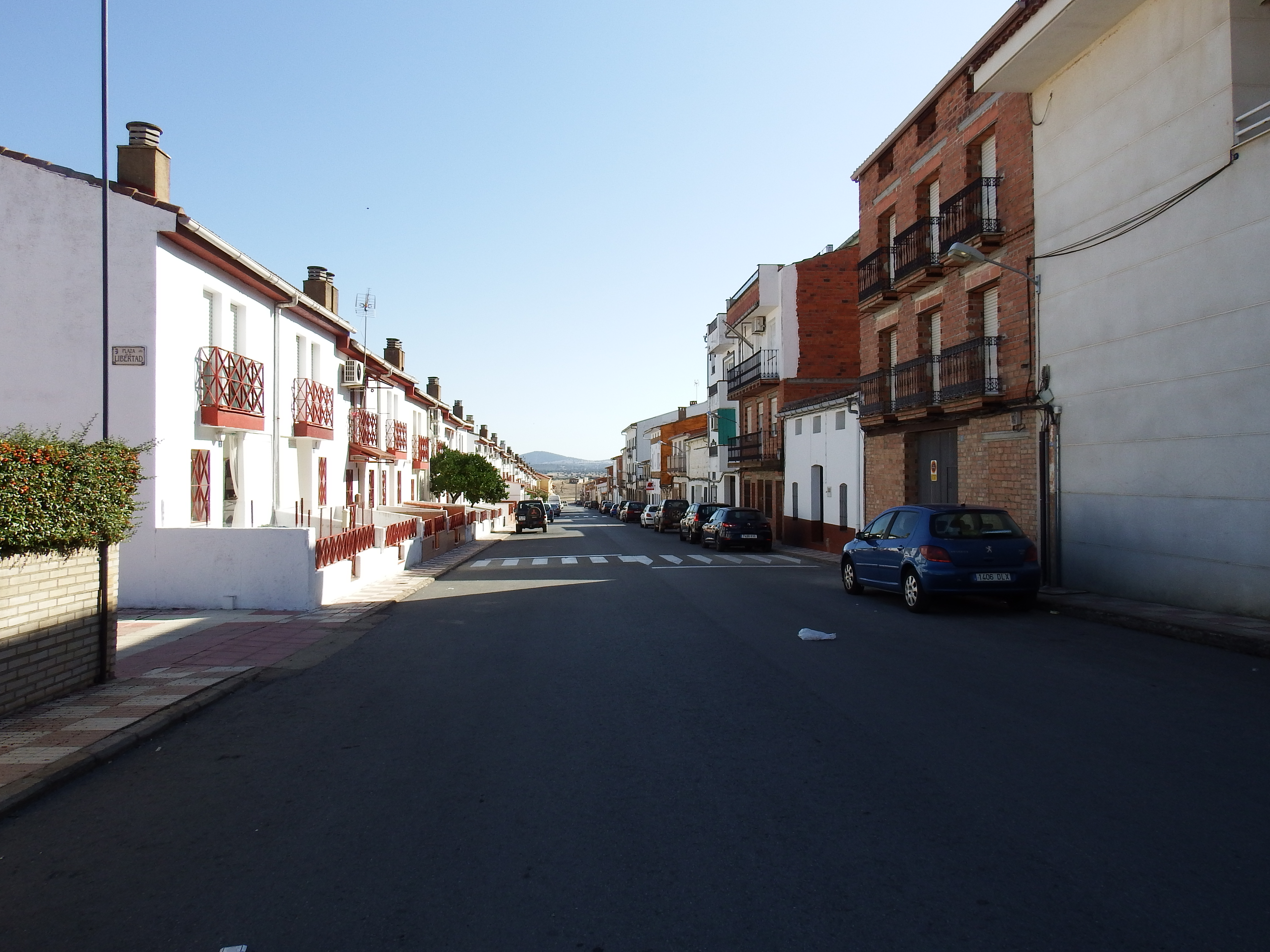
Street in Agudo, Ciudad Real

Coat of arms of Agudo, Ciudad Real

Agudo is a municipality in Ciudad Real, Castile-La Mancha, Spain. It has a population of 2,013.
