= Navahermosa =

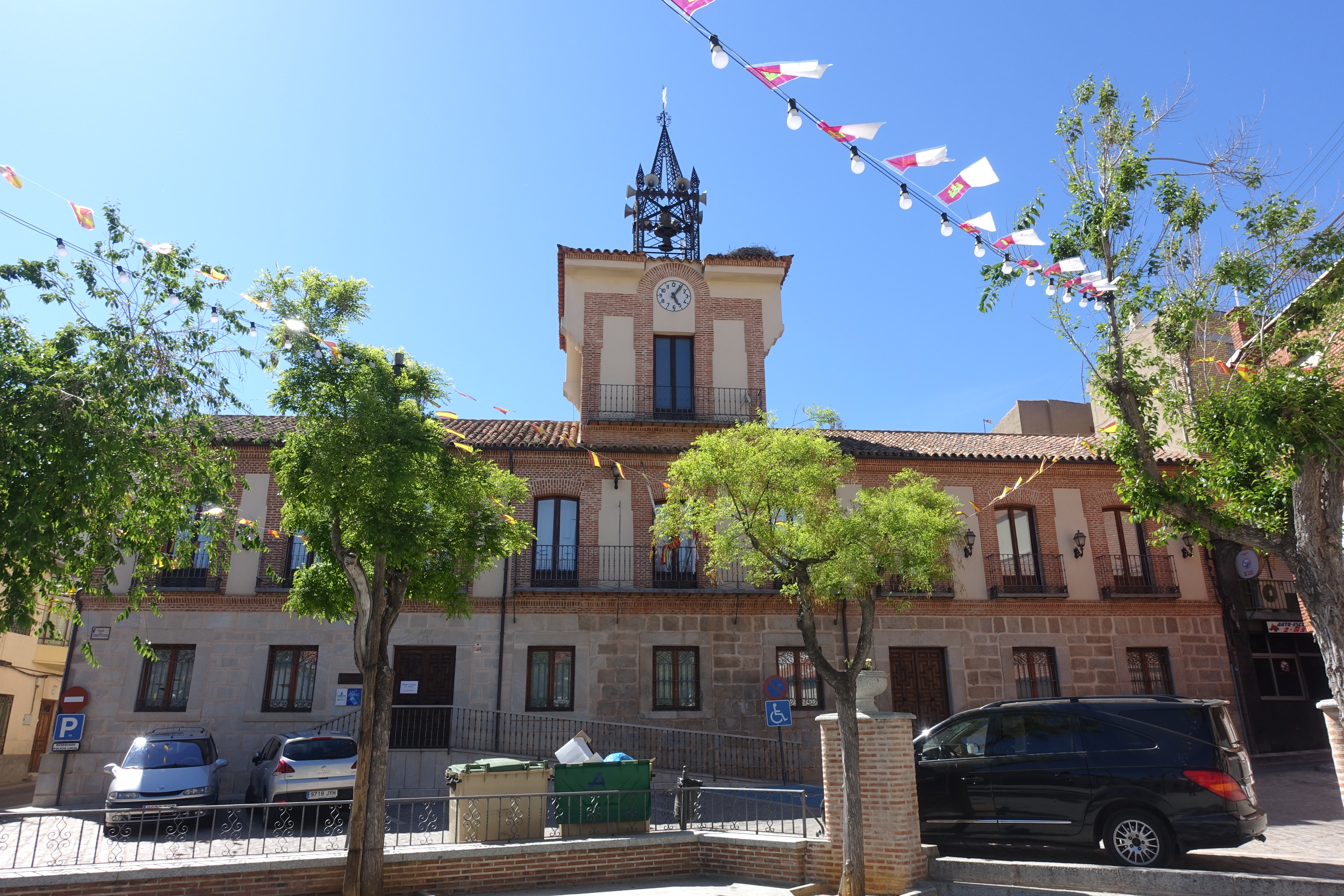
- Town hall

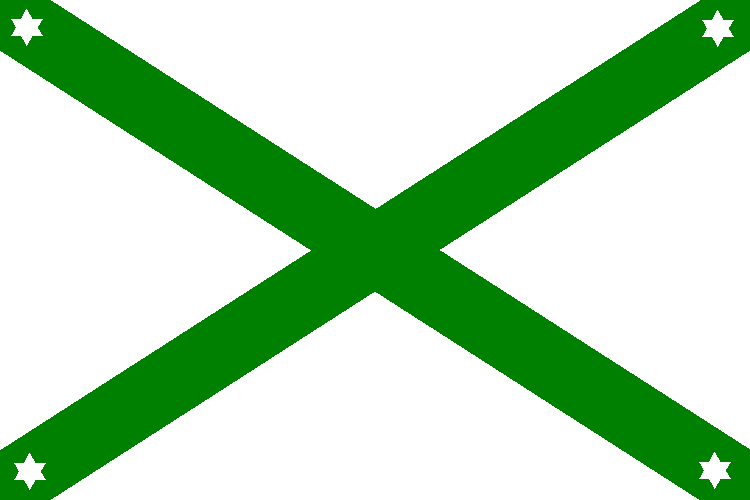
- Flag Coat of arms

- Location in Spain
- Coordinates: 39°38′N 4°29′W
- Country: Spain
- Autonomous community: Castile-La Mancha
- Province: Toledo
- Comarca: Montes de Toledo Comarca

Area
  - Total: 129.79 km^{2} (50.11 sq mi)
- Elevation: 750 m (2,460 ft)

Population (2025-01-01)
  - Total: 3,587
- Time zone: UTC+1 (CET)
  - Summer (DST): UTC+2 (CEST)

Navahermosa is a village in the province of Toledo and autonomous community of Castile-La Mancha, Spain.
