= La Mancha =

Natural and historical region in Spain

- Natural region
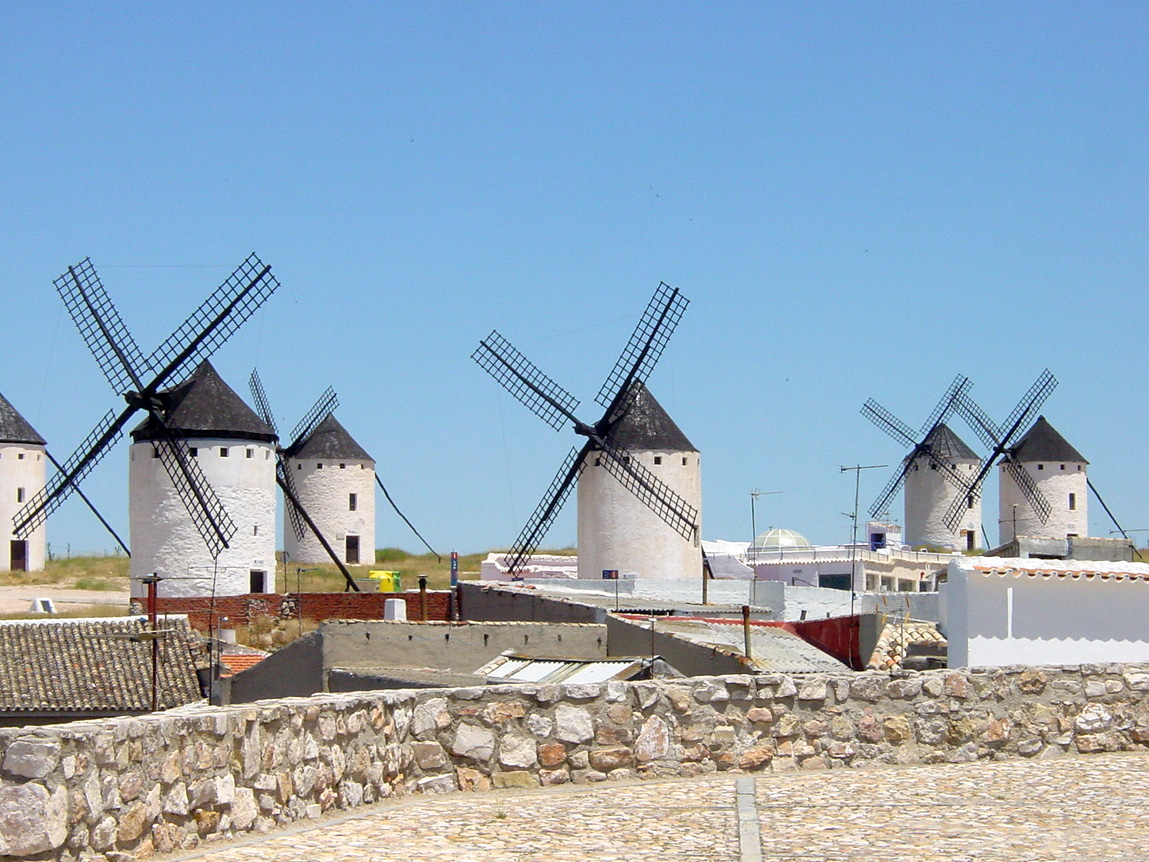
- La Mancha's traditional windmills like these, still standing at Campo de Criptana, were immortalized in the novel Don Quixote.

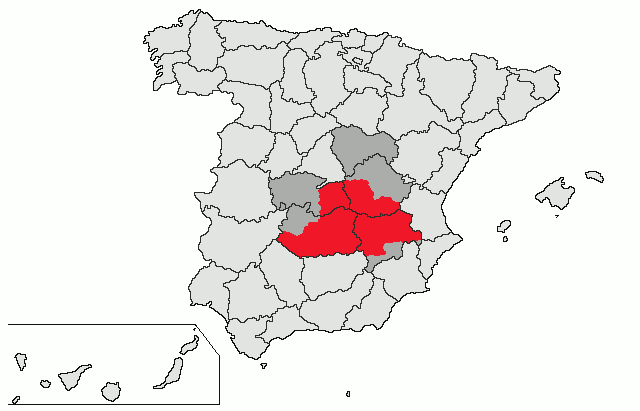
- In red, location of the natural region of La Mancha. In dark gray, present-day Castilla–La Mancha autonomous community territories not included in historical La Mancha.
- Coordinates: 39°24′04″N 3°00′54″W
- Country: Spain
- Elevation: 610 m (2,000 ft)

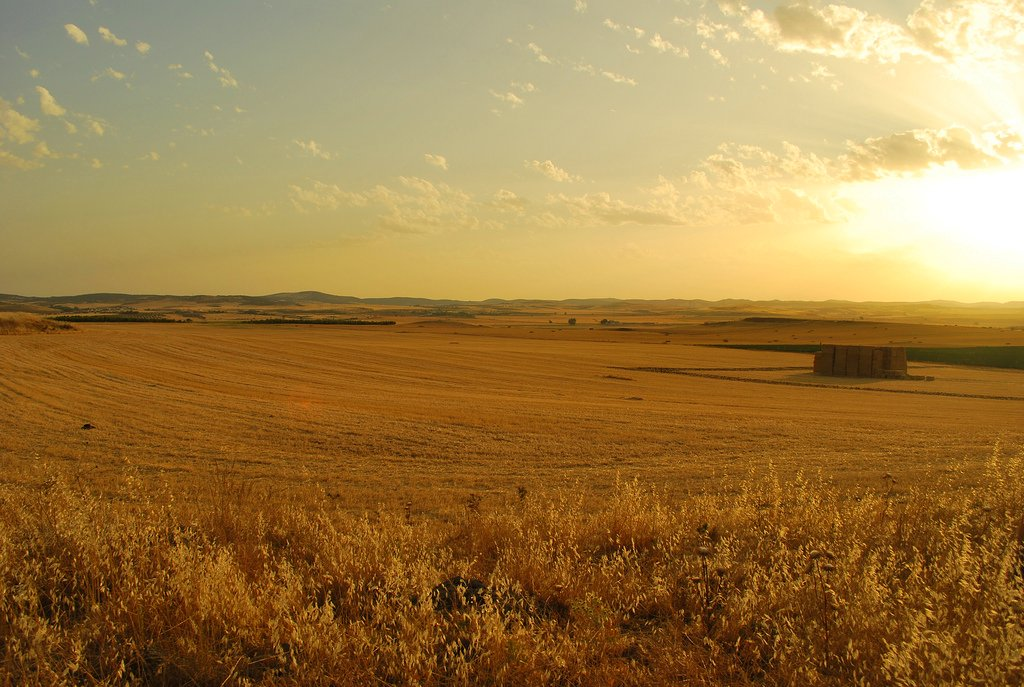
Typical landscape of La Mancha in the province of Ciudad Real

La Mancha (Spanish pronunciation: [la ˈmantʃa]) is a natural region and comarca located in the autonomous community of Castilla–La Mancha (Spain), covering parts of the provinces of Albacete, Ciudad Real, Cuenca and Toledo. Its area varies according to authors: from 15,000 km^{2} (5,800 sq mi) to 30,000 km^{2} (12,000 sq mi) making it one of the most extensive natural plains on the Iberian Peninsula. It represents the center of the Southern Plateau, bordering the regions of Mesa de Ocaña, Montes de Toledo, Campo de Calatrava, Sierra Morena, Campo de Montiel, Campos de Hellín, Monte Ibérico-Corredor de Almansa, Manchuela, Serranía de Cuenca and La Alcarria.

== Political geography ==
=== Modern definition of La Mancha ===
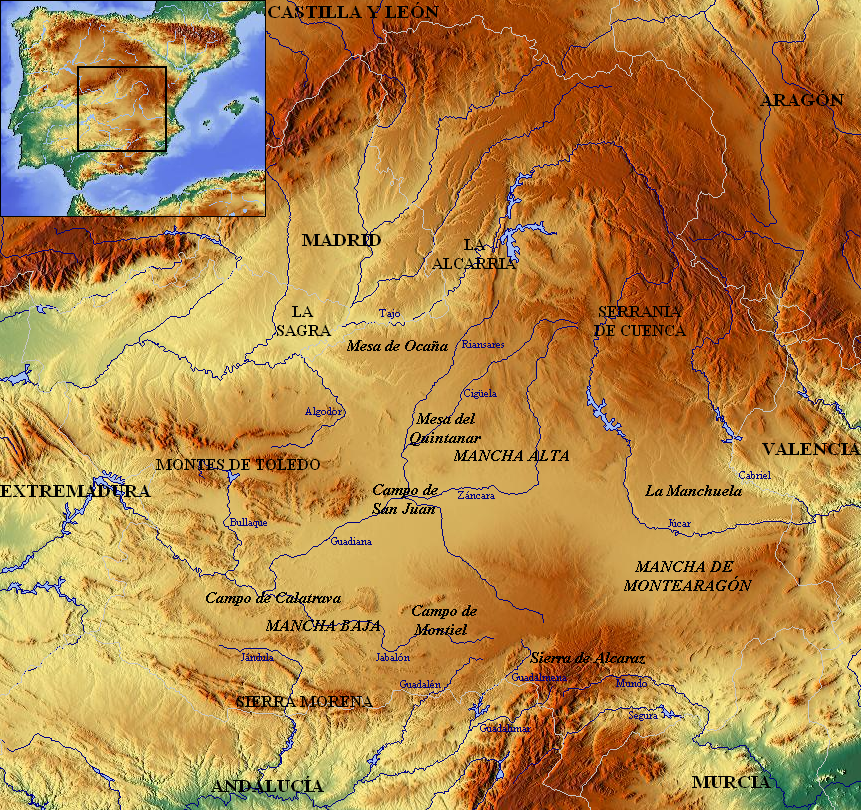
Physical map centered on Castilla–La Mancha, showing the main regions and geographical features of La Mancha (in italics) and adjacent territories.

La Mancha is a natural region in the center of Castilla–La Mancha, located south of the Inner Plateau, constituting one of the most extensive plateaus on the Iberian Peninsula. Its boundaries are imprecise, encompassing parts of the provinces of Albacete, Ciudad Real, Cuenca and Toledo.

One of the definitions of La Mancha is provided by Pascual Madoz in his work Diccionario geográfico-estadístico-histórico de España y sus posesiones de Ultramar (1848):

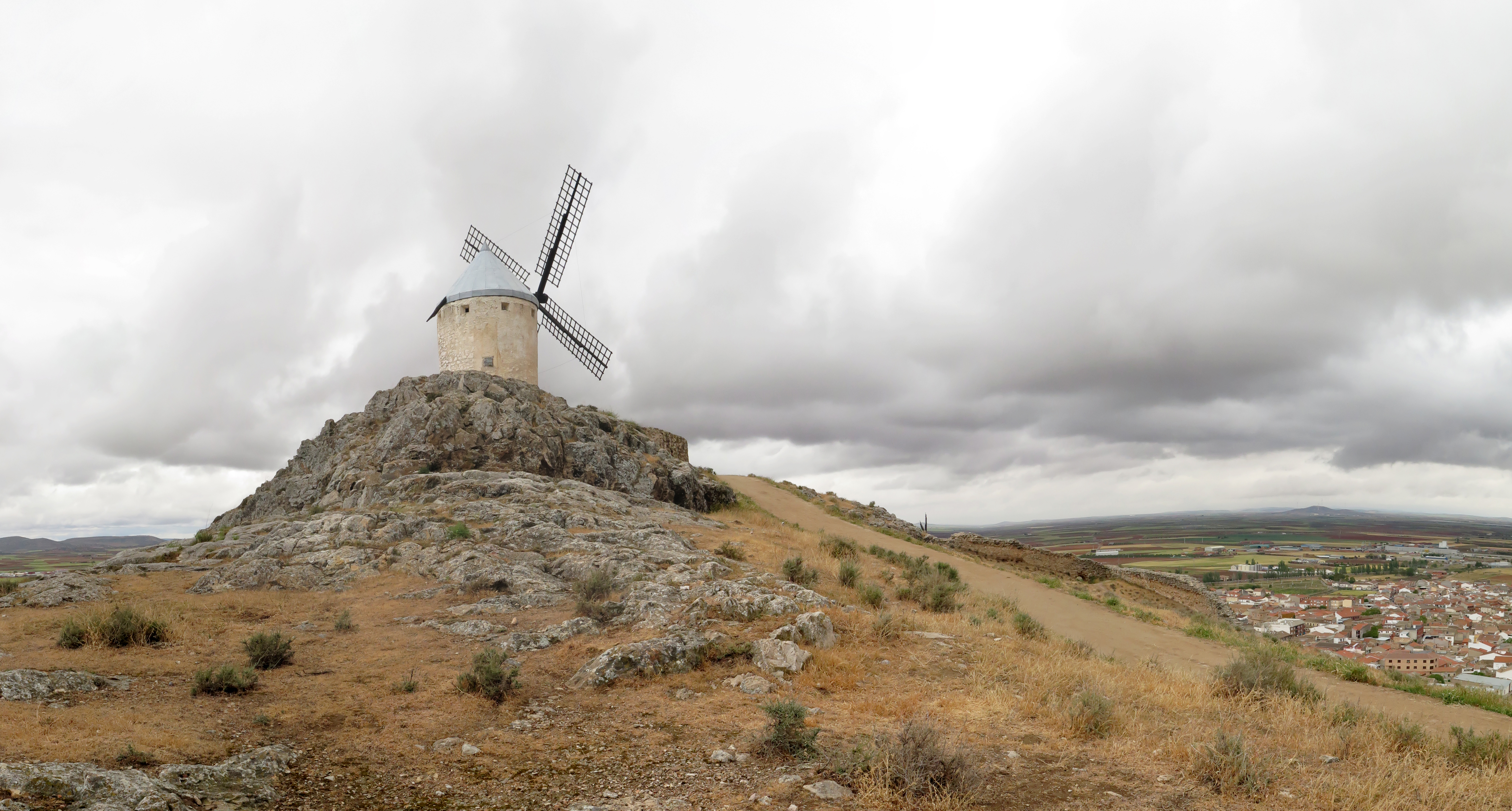
View of one of the windmills of Consuegra (Toledo), a typical image of the region and a visual reference to Don Quixote

the land called Mancha undoubtedly encompasses the region, generally flat, open and arid, stretching from the Montes de Toledo to the western foothills of the Sierra de Cuenca, and from La Alcarria to Sierra Morena; within this area are what is called the Mesa de Ocaña and Quintanar, the districts of Belmonte and San Clemente, the lands of the orders of Santiago, Saint John and Calatrava, and all the land of Alcaraz; its boundaries to the N. are the Tagus, and the part properly called Castilla la Nueva; E. the kingdoms of Valencia and Murcia; S. those of Córdoba and Jaén; W. the provinces of Extremadura, extending 53 leagues from E. to W. and 33 from N. to S.: until the 16th century, the eastern part of this land was called Mancha de Montearagón and Mancha de Aragón [...]; everything else was simply called Mancha: later it was divided into Alta and Baja, according to their difference in level and water flow: the Alta comprises the NE part: from Villarrubia de los Ojos to Belmonte, country of the ancient Laminitanian people; and the Baja the SW part including the fields of Calatrava and Montiel, country of the ancient Oretani.

Similar descriptions of La Mancha were made years later by José de Hosta (1865), or the Enciclopedia Espasa.

Territory encompassed by La Mancha (relative to Castilla–La Mancha) according to Madoz's description (1848), including the province of Ciudad Real and the districts of Ocaña, in their configuration at the time.

Madoz (1848) also delineates La Mancha according to the territorial division of the time:

According to the current civil division, the land of La Mancha corresponds to 4 provinces. That of Ciudad Real is almost entirely within this demarcation (V.) and therefore continues to be commonly known as the province of La Mancha: that of Toledo has its eastern part, that is, the districts of Ocaña, Madridejos, Lillo and Quintanar de la Orden: that of Cuenca, those of Belmonte and San Clemente; and that of Albacete, those of Alcaraz and La Roda.

However, Madoz's description is ambiguous, as in practice it attempted to reflect the boundaries of the former Province of La Mancha, not the region of La Mancha, two distinct elements that share a toponym. The former was an administrative entity of the Kingdom of Toledo or New Castile, while the latter is a natural region from the perspective of physical geography.

According to the study En torno al concepto y límites de un topónimo olvidado: La Mancha de Montaragón by historian Aurelio Pretel Marín (1984), some localities in the current provinces of Cuenca, Albacete, Valencia, Alicante and Murcia were part of the historical Mancha de Montearagón. This term was used to designate a broad frontier space in the east of the Crown of Castile during the Middle Ages, associated with the kingdoms of Toledo or New Castile and Murcia. Although called La Mancha, it should not be confused with the former province of La Mancha, nor with the region of La Mancha, as there is no connection beyond sharing the toponym. In the same study by Pretel Marín (1984), localities historically new Castilian such as Requena (in the Province of Valencia), and Murcian such as Villena and Sax (in the Province of Alicante), along with Yecla, are also included on the eastern edge of Mancha de Montearagón.

Sometimes, Mancha Alta is expanded to include localities in the Toledan region of La Sagra, such as Esquivias, and even Madrid, which has frequently been described as a poblachón (one-horse town) or lugarón manchego. However, this designation is linked to the misuse of the term manchego, as both in the past and present it is erroneously common for civil society and the media to refer to the entirety of Castilla–La Mancha and, in its day, New Castile, as La Mancha or manchego, when neither the entire region is La Mancha from the perspective of physical geography, nor from the historical perspective (Province of La Mancha).

There are also other descriptions of La Mancha, such as those by Félix Pillet and Miguel Panadero in their studies for a geographical regionalization of Castilla–La Mancha from the perspective of physical geography (dividing it into mountain, transition and plain regions), limiting La Mancha to "a great region or subregion of Castilla–La Mancha", turning it into a plain region covering 15,900 km^{2} (6,100 sq mi) and more than 90 municipalities. They present as transition regions Campo de Calatrava, Campo de Montiel, the land of Alarcón, La Manchuela and the Altiplanicie de Almansa, and as mountain regions, the Alcudia Valley, that of Alcaraz and that of Segura. This type of description is the most used by researchers and institutions in Castilla–La Mancha and Spain, as the term La Mancha prevails as a natural region delimited by a series of geographical aspects where the common denominator is the plain, as opposed to the administrative use of the former Province of La Mancha, now obsolete and with no correlation to the region of La Mancha, despite sharing the toponym.

It is also worth noting the importance of altitude in determining exactly what La Mancha is, ranging between 600 and 700 meters (2,000–2,300 ft) above sea level. One of the most widely accepted meanings is that La Mancha means 'elevated place', taking into account the altitude of Campo de Criptana in the heart of La Mancha, which is 707 meters (2,320 ft) above sea level. For example, the altitude of Puertollano, one of the last large towns in southern La Mancha, remains more or less constant at 708 meters (2,323 ft). The altitudes of Cuenca, Toledo and Talavera, as well as other regions not linked to La Mancha, do not correspond to these altitudes. This demonstrates the importance of altitude in determining the geographical, rather than historical, boundaries of La Mancha.

=== Historical evolution of the toponym Mancha and its meaning ===
There are several theories about the origin of the toponym Mancha. Some relate it to the same Latin origin of the Spanish word "mancha" (macŭla), but more people believe that it has an Arabic origin. Some link it to the Arabic word "manxa", translated as "dry land", but there is a greater probability that it originates from the Arabic word "mányà", translated as "high plateau" and "elevated place".

Another much older theory also suggests that La Mancha comes from Arabic. The theory arises from the historian Jerónimo Zurita who states that another historian, Pero López de Ayala, knew that the land of Esparto was called Mancha by the Goths and that the Arabs kept the name Espartaria, which would be Manxa in Arabic. This Espartaria land is linked to the ancient Campo Espartario or Espartaria, of Carthagena Espartera, heir in turn to the Roman and Visigothic province of Hispania Carthaginensis, which encompassed much of present-day Castilla–La Mancha.

The earliest mentions of the toponym Mancha date from 1237, in agreements between the orders of Saint John and Santiago. In one case, it concerns the delineation of the boundaries of both orders: 'The Ruidera is held by the Friars of Uclés, who divided it in two with La Moraleja, running a rope from this landmark to the Mancha de Haver Garat. This reaches the other landmark between Criptana and Santa María de los Llanos. From this landmark, the valley goes up to the road from La Ruidera to Alhambra, turning towards Pozo del Allozo.' The other case involves a payment of cattle from the Commander of the Order of Santiago to the Commander of the Order of Saint John, as compensation for 'the help he received with the Guadiana water, which he drew through the Mancha de Montearagón'.

Apparently, the Mancha de Haver Garat refers to the later Mancha de Vejezate, a region comprising the towns of Tomelloso and Socuéllamos today, centered on the now depopulated Torre de Vejezate. The Mancha de Montearagón, originally "de Montaragón", would point to the territory extending from the Lakes of Ruidera eastward, through which one could travel to Aragon and the Kingdom of Valencia, which was under the full control of James I of Aragon at the time.

In 1282, Manuel of Castile, lord of Villena, received from the future king Sancho IV of Castile the extensive territories of Chinchilla, Jorquera and Ves, in the Mancha de Montearagón. Over time, with the expansion of these domains to Hellín and the land of Alarcón, according to Pretel Marín's conclusions (1984), the geographical concept of the Montearagón region and the political concept of the Lordship (and, later, Marquisate) of Villena were often confused and used interchangeably.

Territory encompassed by the ancient Común de La Mancha relative to the current autonomous community of Castilla–La Mancha.

On the other hand, in 1353, the Master of the Order of Santiago, Fadrique Alfonso, attending to the request of various towns in the area under his Order's jurisdiction, created the Común de La Mancha, including territories of Mancha de Vejezate, with possessions between the rivers Guadiana and Gigüela and its capital in Quintanar de la Orden. Between 1478 and 1603 the following towns are described as belonging to the Común de La Mancha:

- In the current Province of Ciudad Real: Alcázar de San Juan, Campo de Criptana, Herencia, Arenales de San Gregorio, Pedro Muñoz, Socuéllamos and Tomelloso.
- In the current Province of Cuenca: Los Hinojosos, Horcajo de Santiago, Mota del Cuervo, Pozorrubio, Santa María de los Llanos, Villaescusa de Haro and Villamayor de Santiago.
- In the current Province of Toledo: Cabezamesada, Corral de Almaguer, Miguel Esteban, La Puebla de Almoradiel, Quintanar de la Orden, El Toboso, Villa de Don Fadrique and Villanueva de Alcardete.

However, the concept of La Mancha at that time and in subsequent centuries was not limited to the Común de La Mancha and the Marquisate of Villena, but was more extensive, though not as much as it would later become. In the 1570s, in the Topographic Relations of Philip II, in addition to the localities of the ancient Común Santiaguista, then already a partido, the localities of Campo de San Juan are also mentioned as being in La Mancha. However, this is not the case in the Campo de Montiel towns, where only Membrilla is said to be in La Mancha, nor in the Campo de Calatrava towns, where only four are said to be in La Mancha. López-Salazar (2005) suggests that, in the case of Campo de Calatrava, the connection to the Maestrazgo de Calatrava or the district of Almagro was more significant than the geographical reference alone. Nevertheless, he also argues that La Mancha was not yet a well-known place name. Indeed, some towns claimed to be in La Mancha (Ballesteros and Tirteafuera) despite having less geographical justification than others that did not (such as Daimiel or Manzanares). Similar circumstances occurred in the Mancha de Montearagón (known at that time as the Mancha de Aragón), where, according to reports by Philip II, few places claimed to be located, preferring instead the name of the Marquisate of Villena, even after its disappearance. According to Petrel Marín (1984), this was due to the Marquisate's greater political importance and the refusal of some towns that were never Aragonese but Castilian to be called 'de Aragón'.

In 1605, three decades after Philip II's Relaciones, Miguel de Cervantes published The Ingenious Gentleman Don Quixote of La Mancha, and in 1615, its second part: Second part of the ingenious knight Don Quixote of La Mancha. It is a burlesque: the protagonists of his beloved chivalric romances, which inspire him, hail from noble countries and regions: Greece, France and Brittany, to name a few. Saying that Don Quixote is from La Mancha is not an attack on this region, but rather a humorous way of highlighting this character's presumptuousness at the beginning of the novel. However, the novel's enormous success also meant the 'success of the toponym' of the land in which it is set — the homeland of the protagonist, Don Quixote — according to López-Salazar (2005). This success would also have meant the expansion of its boundaries.

Districts that formed the province of La Mancha in relation to the current autonomous community of Castilla–La Mancha (with dates of membership in parentheses): Ciudad Real (1691–1810; 1814–1822; 1823–1833) District of Almagro and Campo de Calatrava (1691–1810; 1814–1822; 1823–1833) District of Alcaraz (1691–1810; 1814–1822; 1823–1833) District of Villanueva de los Infantes, Order of Santiago (1691–1810; 1814–1822; 1823–1833) District of Villanueva de los Infantes, Order of Santiago (municipalities now outside Castilla–La Mancha, in the province of Jaén) (1691–1810; 1814–1822; 1823–1833) District of Villanueva de los Infantes, Order of Santiago (municipalities of the Mesa del Quintanar added to this district, Order of Santiago) (1785–1810; 1814–1822; 1823–1833) District of the Grand Priory of St. John (1799–1810; 1814–1822; 1823–1833)

In 1691, the province of La Mancha was established, incorporating the districts of Ciudad Real (its capital), Almagro (including the entire Campo de Calatrava), Villanueva de los Infantes (encompassing the Campo de Montiel), and Alcaraz. Initially, it excluded territories from the former Común de La Mancha, the Campo de San Juan, and the so-called Mancha de Aragón, though it did include areas beyond the geographical boundaries of the Manchego plain, such as the Sierra de Alcaraz and the region around Almadén. In 1785, several towns from the Mesa del Quintanar (the old Común de La Mancha) were added to the province, followed in 1799 by the district of the Grand Priory of St. John (the entire Campo de San Juan). This provincial division gained strong local acceptance (López-Salazar, 2005), despite reform attempts during the Peninsular War, the Liberal Triennium, and ultimately the reign of Isabella II. In 1833, the territories of the former province of La Mancha were redistributed among the provinces of Jaén (a small portion), Cuenca, Toledo, Albacete, and primarily Ciudad Real; the latter became popularly known for a time as the “province of La Mancha.”

Location of the “Manchegan provinces,” according to Mancheguian regionalism, within Spain.

Descriptions of La Mancha from the 19th century include that of Madoz. Notably, the province of Albacete, upon its creation in 1833, was attached to the historical Region of Murcia, with much of its territory having previously belonged to the Kingdom of Murcia. In contrast, the provinces of Ciudad Real, Cuenca, and Toledo were integrated into the region of the Kingdom of Toledo/New Castile, alongside Guadalajara and Madrid. During the 19th and 20th centuries, a Mancheguian regionalism movement emerged, advocating for a Manchegan Region comprising what it regarded as the four “Manchegan provinces” (Albacete, Ciudad Real, Cuenca, and Toledo), though this effort yielded no results. Most of these provinces neither historically (as the province of La Mancha) nor geographically (as a natural region) constitute La Mancha proper. Early 20th-century Mancheguian regionalism broadened the use of the terms “La Mancha” and “Manchego” to encompass all four provinces.

Location of the autonomous community of Castilla–La Mancha within Spain.

During the Spanish transition to democracy, as Spain was divided into autonomous communities, extensive debates over boundaries and nomenclature led to the creation of Castilla–La Mancha, incorporating the provinces of Albacete, Ciudad Real, Cuenca, Guadalajara, and Toledo while separating the historical, cultural, and natural region of Madrid. Although Castilla–La Mancha comprises diverse subregions, La Mancha among them, media and everyday speech often erroneously refer to the community simply as “La Mancha” or abbreviate its demonym “castellano-manchego” to “manchego.” This usage has overshadowed other highland or foothill areas within Castilla–La Mancha.

Today, from a physical geography perspective, La Mancha is recognized as a natural region within the district division and associations of Castilla–La Mancha, despite lacking its own administrative entity. It comprises La Mancha in Ciudad Real, Toledo, and Cuenca, the Llanos de Albacete, and Mancha Júcar-Centro. La Mancha also features in several protected designations of origin and protected geographical indications bearing its name (La Mancha (DO) for wine, La Mancha saffron, and La Mancha melon) or its demonym (Manchego cheese and Manchego lamb), though production areas do not fully coincide.

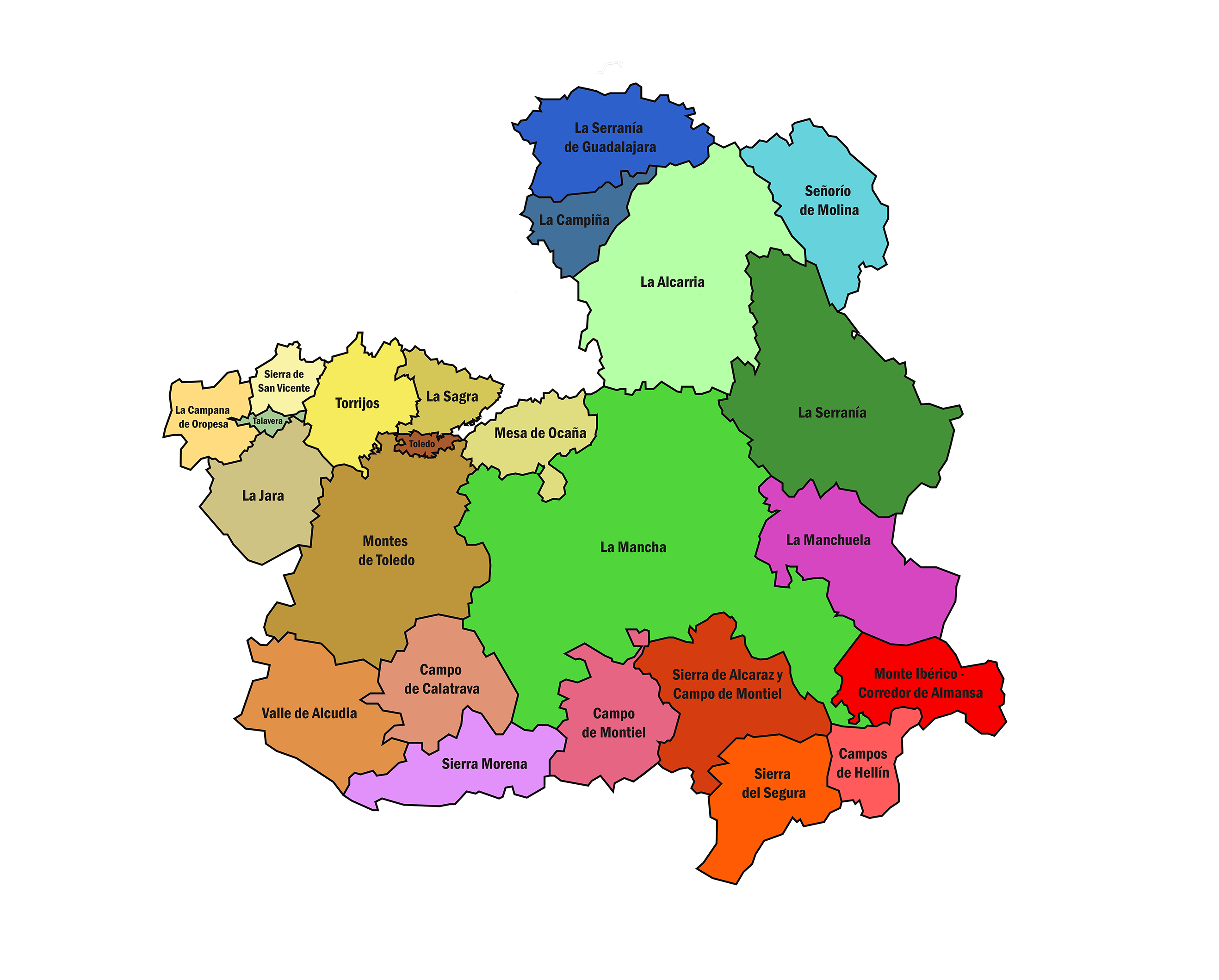
Districts and municipal associations of Castilla–La Mancha

== History ==
=== Prehistory and antiquity ===
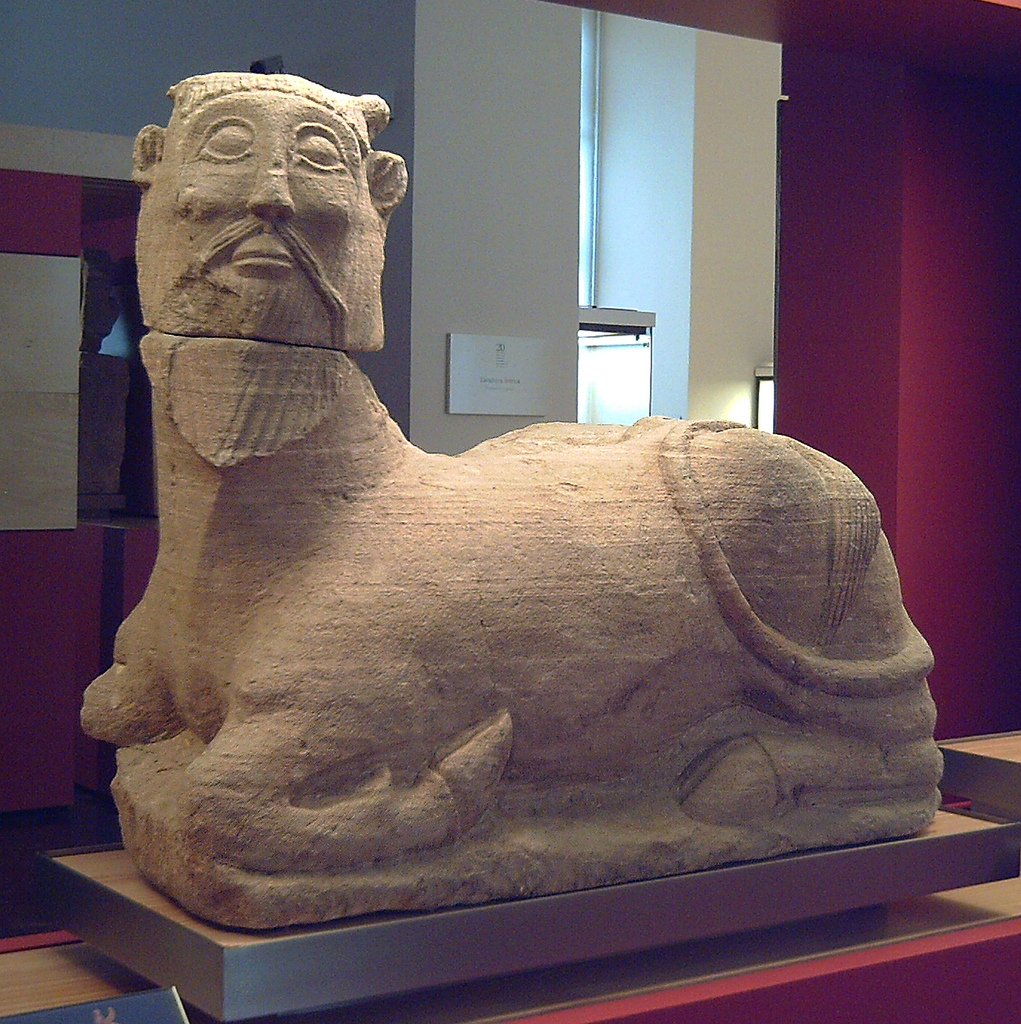
Bicha of Balazote, an example of Iberian art in La Mancha.

Prehistoric remains in La Mancha are plentiful, though in-depth studies of local sites remain limited. Surface Paleolithic deposits abound, primarily along riverbanks, likely representing seasonal camps. The Guadiana River and its tributaries form an area that is particularly rich in deposits of this type. For instance, the upper Guadiana, dominated by the Córcoles River and Sotuélamos River, and the Cañada de Valdelobos, contains numerous Middle Paleolithic sites. Similar clusters appear in the middle Guadiana. Paleolithic rock art includes schematic figures at Fuencaliente, vaguely resembling Levantine styles.

During the Neolithic and Bronze Age, the Motillas culture developed in the southern and central areas (eastern Ciudad Real and western Albacete). This sedentary society built fortified settlements with concentric walls forming tiered levels, creating artificial hill-like defenses. The region later experienced successive Indo-European invasions and Iberian influences, especially in Albacete and Ciudad Real, with notable sites such as the Cerro de los Santos, Llano de la Consolación, Pozo Moro, El Amarejo, and the Iberian settlements of Alarcos and Cerro de las Cabezas in Valdepeñas. Ancient authors classified the region's inhabitants—despite strong Indo-European influences—as the Oretani (centered at Oretum, modern Granátula de Calatrava in Ciudad Real) and the Carpetani along the Tagus, whose main city was Toletum (Toledo), dedicated to the water god Tolt. These were pastoral, agricultural, and warrior peoples. The earliest historical references stem from conflicts between Carthaginians and indigenous groups shortly before the Second Punic War, driven mainly by control of the Sisapo mines (now La Bienvenida), the world's largest mercury deposit, a key economic driver in La Mancha until the 1970s.

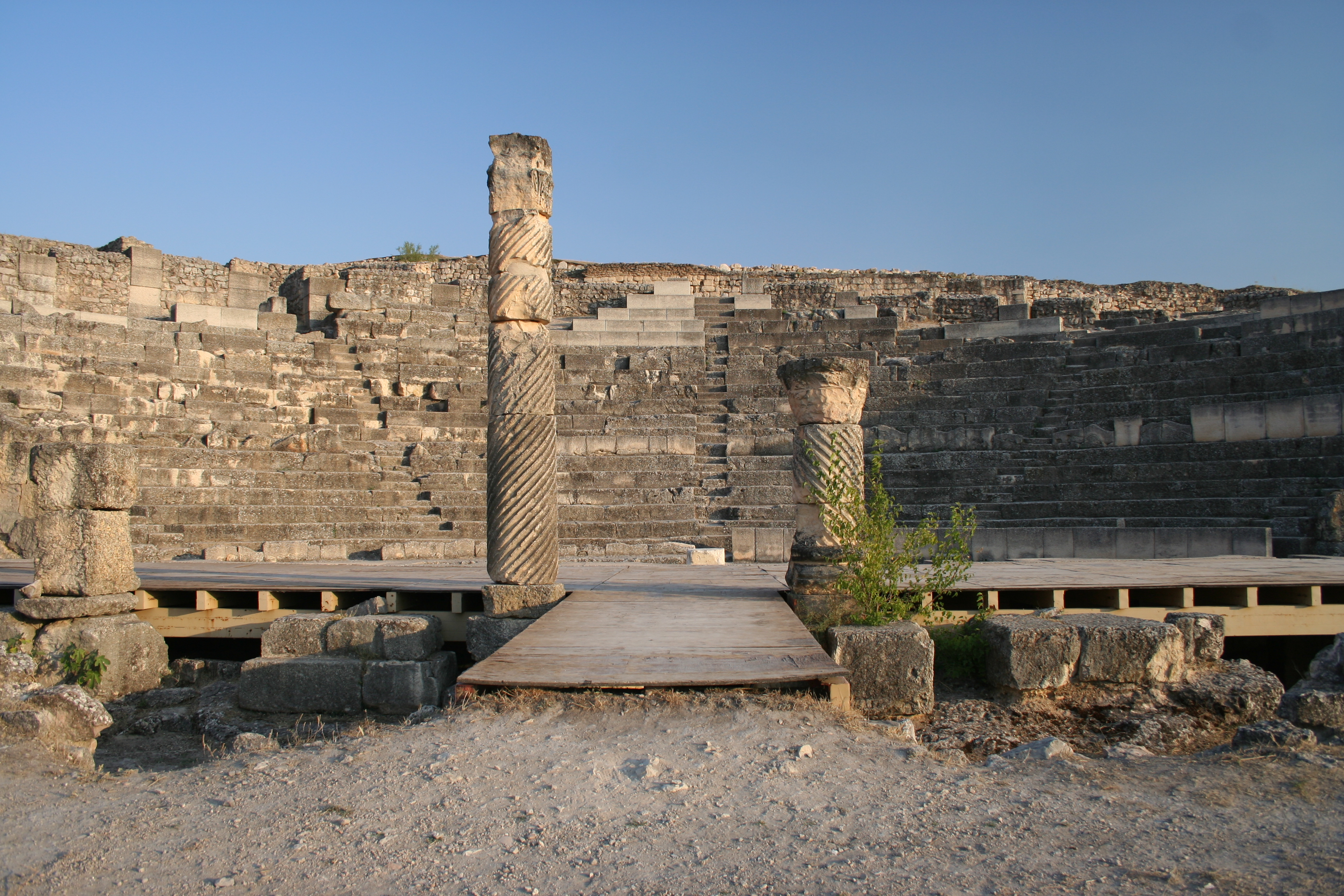
Roman theatre at Segóbriga.

The Romans, conquering Toletum in 193 BC, reportedly called the expanse “Campo Espartario” (likely a reference to esparto cultivation), though some link the toponym solely to Cartagena (then Carthago Nova, later Carthago Spartaria). Strabo provides an extensive description of the region, noting the major road improvements made by Augustus that diverted the route from Rome to Gades (Cádiz) inland, in order to avoid the long, arid Campo Estepario and the local guerrilla resistance that persisted long after the Roman conquest. Although the cities remained largely unimportant, Laminium, Libisosa, Toletum, Segóbriga, Sisapo and Oretum stood out. Following the arrival of Christianity, Toledo and Oretum became bishoprics.

=== Middle Ages ===
After the decline of the Roman Empire in the fifth century, the Vandals and Alans passed through the area. They were succeeded by the Visigoths, who made Toledo their capital in 569. Vast areas of La Mancha, however, remained depopulated.

In 711, the Arabs crossed the Strait of Gibraltar and began conquering the Iberian Peninsula, which they called Al-Andalus. According to several theories, the place name "Mancha" comes from the Arabic language. "Manxa" or "Al-Mansha" translates to "land without water," while "Manya" translates to "high plain" or "elevated place." These are the most common theories about the origin of the place name.

Under Muslim rule, La Mancha remained sparsely populated, though some cities developed, such as Toledo and Calatrava, which was founded by the Umayyads in the eighth and ninth centuries. Other important cities include Cuenca and Alcaraz, which became centers of the textile industry. The Arabs contributed greatly to the region's agriculture thanks to their advanced irrigation techniques and to livestock farming by introducing Merino sheep.

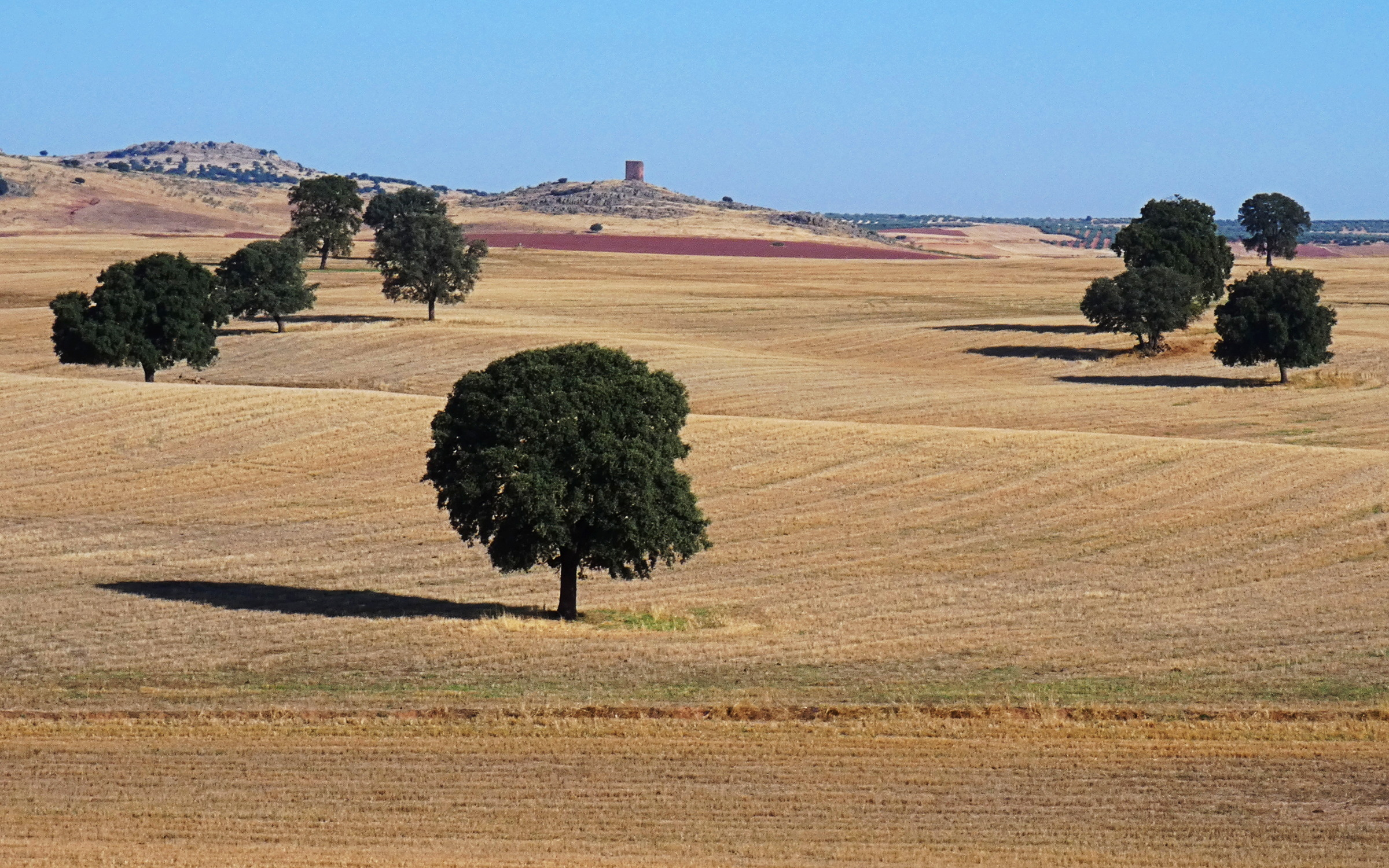
The La Mancha landscape with the 13th-century Torre de la Higuera in the distance, located between Villamanrique and Torre de Juan Abad.

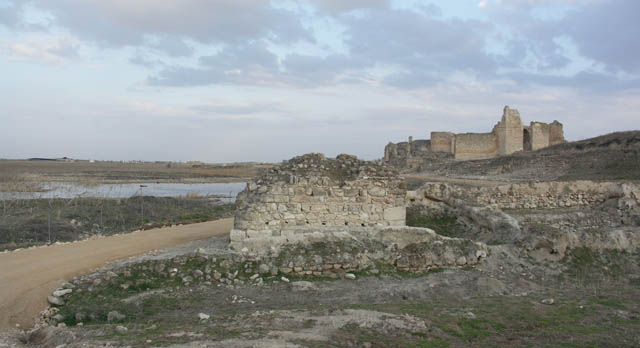
Ruins of Calatrava la Vieja.

Following the collapse of the Caliphate of Córdoba, most of La Mancha came under the control of the Taifa of Toledo, which competed with the Taifas of Seville and Murcia for dominance. Castilian intervention on Toledo's behalf culminated in the city's surrender in 1085, launching the Christian Reconquista of northern La Mancha. Castile soon faced the Almoravids, who were summoned by rival taifas. This turned La Mancha into a battlefield, resulting in frequent raids and sparse settlement. The Almoravids reached their peak of dominance after the Battle of Uclés in 1108, forcing the Castilians to retreat to the Tagus. The Almoravids began to decline in 1144, which led to the resurgence of the taifa kingdoms and the arrival of the Almohads. These developments enabled Christian advances. Calatrava was captured in 1147 and entrusted to Raymond of Fitero, founder of the Order of Calatrava, in 1158. A Castilian defeat at the Battle of Alarcos in 1195 halted progress until the Battle of Las Navas de Tolosa in 1212. In 1213, Alfonso VIII established the Alfoz of Alcaraz, placing nearly all of La Mancha under Castilian control, along with the Guadalquivir Valley. The Guadalquivir Valley was prioritized for repopulation over La Mancha, much of which was given to military orders. The Campo de Calatrava went to the Order of Calatrava, within whose lands Alfonso X founded Villa Real (now Ciudad Real) in 1255 to curb the order's power. The Order of St. John took the Campo de San Juan, and the Order of Santiago, based in Uclés, seized much of Upper La Mancha and the Campo de Montiel, reducing Alcaraz's territory. The earliest uses of "Mancha" are found in eastern La Mancha and Mancha de Montaragón, which was first mentioned in 1237, alongside the initial record of La Mancha de Haver Garat. Most of Mancha de Montearagón was under the Lordship of Villena in the 13th and 14th centuries, after Alarcón was transferred to it. Meanwhile, eastern Campo de Montiel and the Sierra de Alcaraz remained on the borders of Alcaraz, forming "Eastern Mancha" due to the region's inseparable topographical and route-related ties. On the other hand, the Order of Santiago divided its territories into three communes: Uclés, La Mancha, and Montiel. These communes were associations of towns within the same jurisdiction for fiscal and livestock purposes.

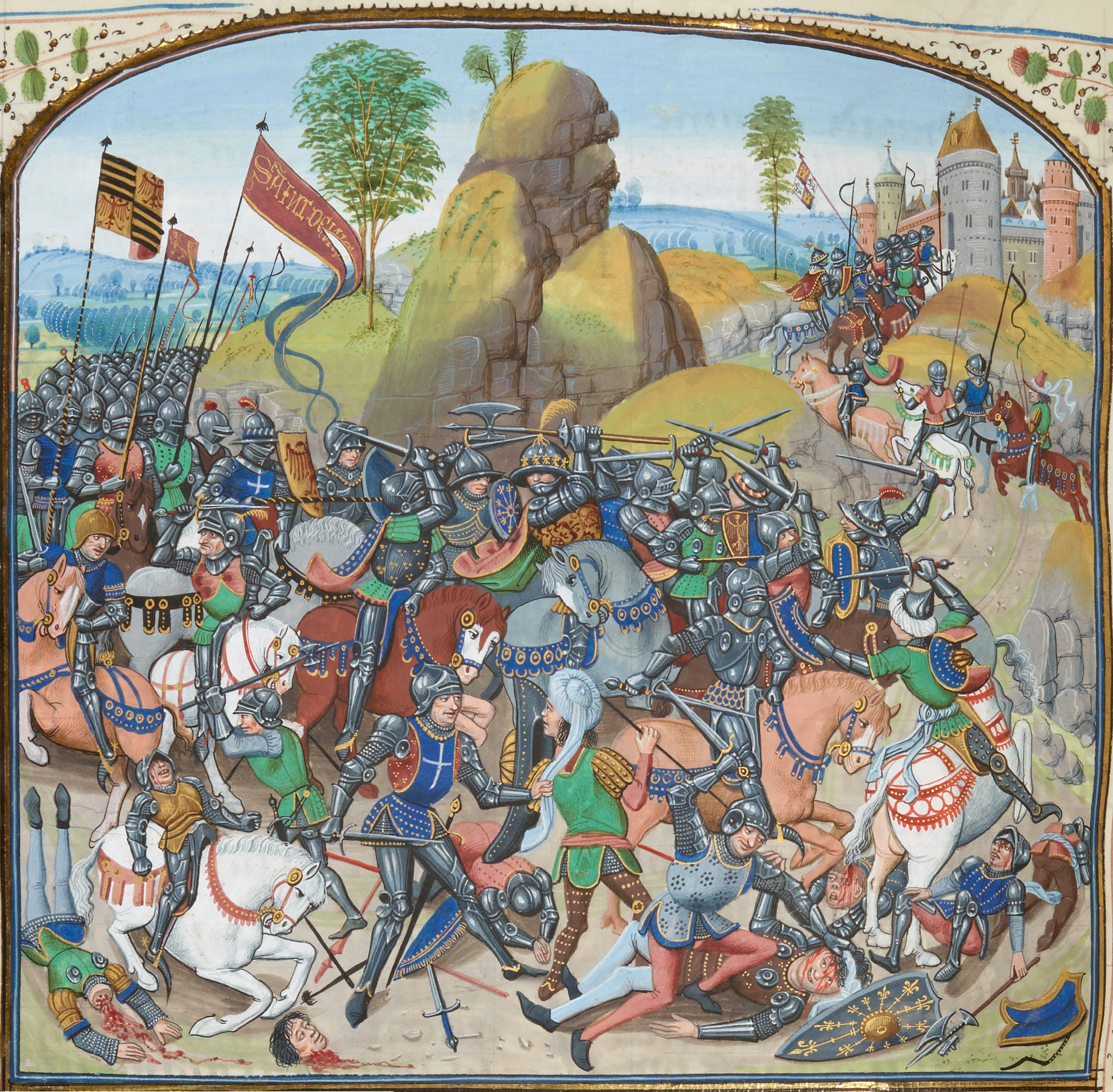
15th-century miniature by Jean Froissart depicting the Battle of Montiel

As part of the kingdoms of Toledo and Murcia (in the southeastern part of the Crown of Castile), La Mancha witnessed and suffered from the subsequent Castilian Civil Wars. As a border region of the Crown of Aragon, it also experienced conflicts between the two crowns. The First Castilian Civil War (1351–1369) pitted supporters of Peter I "the Cruel" (or "the Just" to his partisans) against his half-brother, Henry of Trastámara. This war was intertwined with the Hundred Years' War and the War of the Two Pedros (1356–1369), which was fought between Peter I and Peter IV of Aragon. The war ended in La Mancha at the Battle of Montiel in 1369, where Henry killed Peter and became Henry II of Castile. Henry subsequently elevated the Lordship of Villena to the first Marquisate of Villena in Castile and granted it to Alfonso I in 1366, a grant confirmed in Burgos in February 1367. However, Alfonso could not assume the title after his capture at the Battle of Nájera on April 3, 1367. Beyond the toll of war, the Black Death ravaged Europe in the 14th century.

In the 15th century, Castile—and with it La Mancha—experienced factional clashes that culminated in the War of the Castilian Succession. This war pitted supporters of Joanna la Beltraneja, the daughter of Henry IV "the Impotent" (or, according to rumors, the daughter of Henry's favorite, Beltrán de la Cueva), against supporters of Henry's sister, Isabella. In La Mancha, the Marquis of Villena (Diego López Pacheco), the Grand Master of Santiago (Juan Pacheco, the Marquis's father), and the Master of Calatrava (Rodrigo Téllez Girón, Juan Pacheco's nephew) supported Joanna.
Several Villena towns rose against them in Alcaraz in March 1475, sparking internal order conflicts. The war became international with Joanna's marriage to Afonso V of Portugal and Isabella's marriage to Ferdinand, heir to the throne of Aragon. The war ended in 1479 with the Treaty of Alcáçovas, which secured victory for Isabella and Ferdinand, who would later be known as the Catholic Monarchs. After the war, the Marquisate of Villena lost much of its territory to the royal domain. Meanwhile, Ferdinand became Master of Calatrava and administered Santiago. The Catholic Monarchs established institutions such as the Santa Hermandad and the Inquisition. In 1492, they conquered the Nasrid Kingdom of Granada, which ended Muslim rule in Iberia and the threat of raids in southern La Mancha.

=== Early modern period ===
The last Castilian war erupted in the 16th century. Upon the accession of Charles I (son of Joanna "the Mad" and grandson of the Catholic Monarchs), his reliance on Flemish advisors sparked opposition. In 1520, revolts in Castilian cities sparked the Revolt of the Comuneros. Toledo became a hub for the revolt, demanding Joanna's restoration. The war ended with the Comuneros' defeat in 1522. The following year, in 1523, Pope Adrian VI permanently attached the masterships of the military orders of Santiago and the Order of Calatrava to the Spanish Crown.

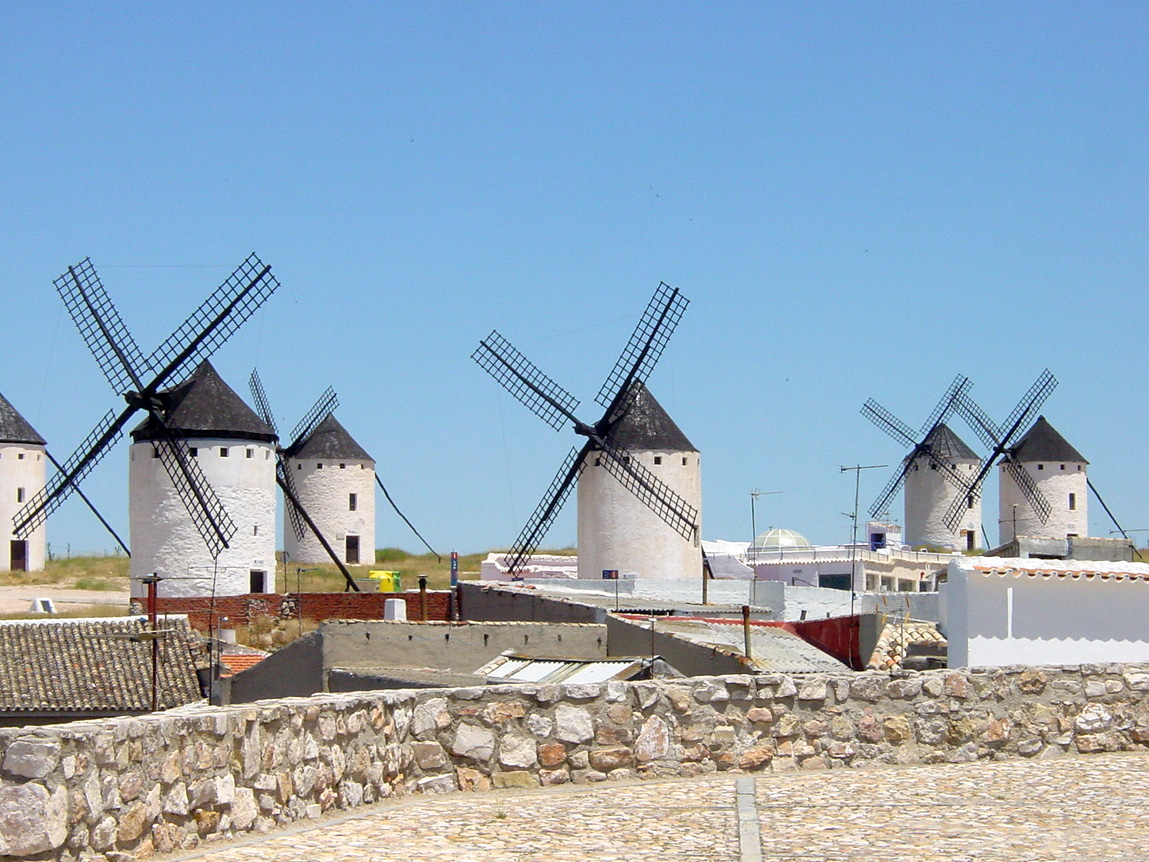
Windmills at Campo de Criptana.

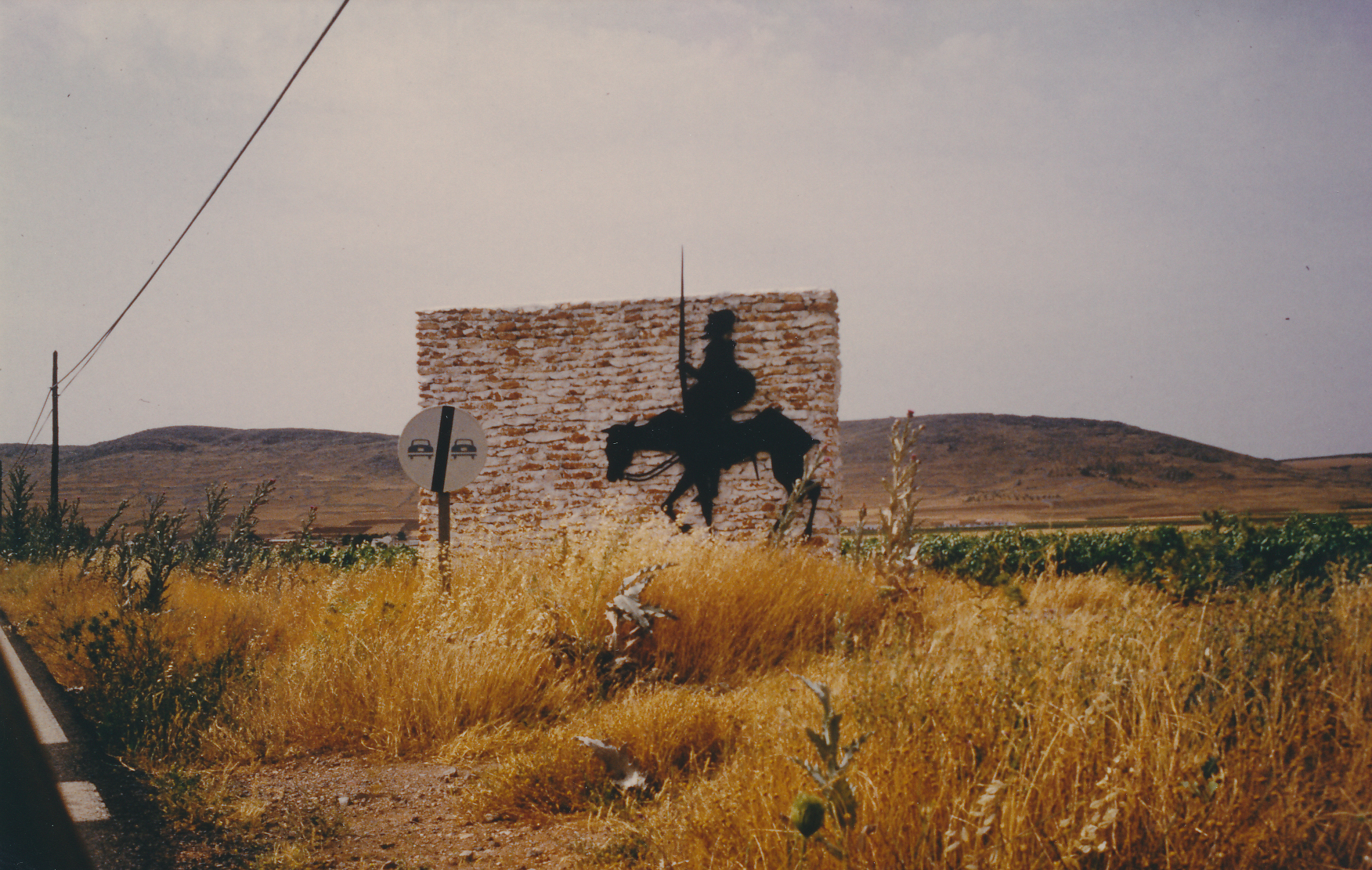
La Mancha, homeland of Don Quixote.

Following their defeat in the Rebellion of the Alpujarras (1568–1571), Philip II ordered the Moriscos dispersed throughout Castile, including La Mancha. The Moriscos were eventually expelled in 1609. Windmills, used for grinding grain, also spread throughout La Mancha in the 16th century. During this time, Miguel de Cervantes immortalized the region and its society in his work Don Quixote, bringing them universal fame. The first part of the book was published in 1605, and the second part was published in 1615. Like the rest of Spain, La Mancha suffered from continuous wars abroad during the 16th and 17th centuries under the reign of the House of Austria.

During the War of the Spanish Succession (1701–1714), Castilian territories supported Philip of Anjou, while the Aragonese supported Archduke Charles of Austria. As a border region of Aragon, La Mancha was the site of decisive battles, such as the Battle of Almansa. Philip V emerged victorious. During the 18th century under the Bourbons, enlightened despotism prevailed.

As early as 1691, the decision was made to separate the province of La Mancha from the rest of the Kingdom of Toledo. The districts of Alcaraz, Almagro, Ciudad Real, and Infantes were incorporated into the province to facilitate its administration. Although the capital was located in Ciudad Real, it was briefly moved to Almagro from 1750 to 1761. Following Floridablanca's territorial reorganization in 1785, the towns of the Order of Santiago in Mesa de Quintanar were added to La Mancha. In 1799, the towns of the Grand Priory of San Juan were separated from Toledo. This reorganization also established the provinces of Toledo and Cuenca and expanded the province of Murcia to the northwest, occupying much of the current province of Albacete. The provinces of La Mancha, Cuenca, Toledo, Guadalajara, and Madrid formed the region of New Castile.

In 1802, Charles IV proclaimed himself Grand Master of the Order of St. John of Jerusalem in Spain and incorporated its lands into the crown.

=== Contemporary period ===
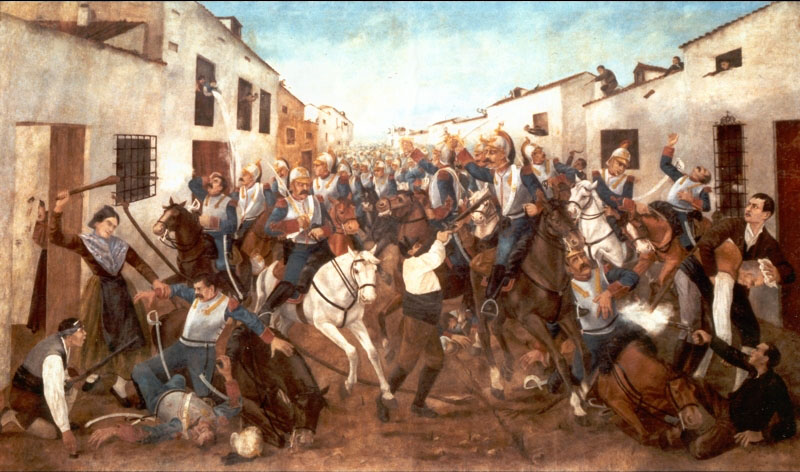
Skirmish at Valdepeñas on June 6, 1808.

The Peninsular War (1808–1813) devastated La Mancha. It pitted French forces supporting Joseph I, who was imposed by Napoleon, against patriotic guerrillas who sought the restoration of Ferdinand VII. Key events included the Action of Valdepeñas and the Battle of Ciudad Real.

The Superior Junta of La Mancha formed in opposition to the Afrancesado administration and published the Gazeta de la Junta Superior de la Mancha (1811–1812) from Elche de la Sierra, Alcaraz, and Ciudad Real.

There were attempts at provincial reform: the Afrancesado regime created prefectures in 1810, establishing Manzanares as the capital of La Mancha with subprefectures in Ciudad Real and Alcaraz, while the Cortes of Cádiz devised a new division in 1813. However, neither reform endured after Ferdinand VII's return in 1814 and the restoration of absolutism.

Following Rafael del Riego’s pronunciamiento in 1820, the liberals took power. In 1822, a provincial reform abolished La Mancha Province, replacing it mostly with Ciudad Real Province and creating Chinchilla from lands formerly belonging to La Mancha, Cuenca, and Murcia. The Liberal Triennium collapsed in 1823 with the intervention of the Hundred Thousand Sons of Saint Louis at the request of Ferdinand VII, followed by the persecution of liberals.

Following Ferdinand VII's death in 1833, Isabella II succeeded him under the regency of Maria Christina, who allied with the liberals against Carlos’s supporters. The 1833 territorial division of Spain established the modern provinces of Albacete, Ciudad Real, Cuenca, and Toledo, ending the La Mancha province. Meanwhile, Ciudad Real, Cuenca, Toledo, Madrid, and Guadalajara formed Castilla la Nueva, while Albacete and Murcia formed the Region of Murcia. Later changes: Villena was transferred to Alicante in 1836, Villarrobledo to Albacete in 1846, and Utiel and Requena to Valencia in 1851 and 1854.

During this time, feudalism was also definitively abolished in Spain.

During the three Carlist Wars (1833–1840, 1846–1849, and 1872–1876), La Mancha largely supported the liberal government in Madrid, though Carlists seized towns such as El Bonillo under Ramón Cabrera. Carlism was particularly strong in the northern part of the province of Cuenca. During this time, there was an increase in banditry.

La Mancha experienced significant losses due to confiscations in the 19th century, especially those carried out by Mendizábal and Madoz.

After Isabella II was ousted in the Glorious Revolution of 1868, representatives of the Federal Democratic Republican Party met in Alcázar de San Juan and signed the La Mancha Regional Pact. The draft of the 1873 Federal Constitution omitted a "State of La Mancha," instead creating the states of New Castile and Murcia. During the Cantonal Rebellion in 1873, Ciudad Real proclaimed the Cantón Manchego, which failed like the broader revolt. Federal hopes ended with the fall of the First Spanish Republic in 1874. Mancheguian regionalism resurfaced in 1906 with the establishment of the Centro Regional Manchego in Madrid. The organization designed a flag and anthem for a region comprising Albacete, Ciudad Real, Cuenca, and Toledo. The 1913 Provincial Associations Decree enabled the formation of a Mancomunidad Manchega, which was proposed by the provincial council of Albacete in 1924 but was unsuccessful. After the proclamation of the Second Spanish Republic in 1931, deputies and provincial presidents met in 1933 to discuss the formation of an autonomous La Mancha region. The Spanish Civil War (1936–1939) halted progress, and most of the territory remained Republican until the end of the war. Under Francoism, the Interprovincial Economic Syndical Council of La Mancha, established in 1962, coordinated the councils of the four provinces.

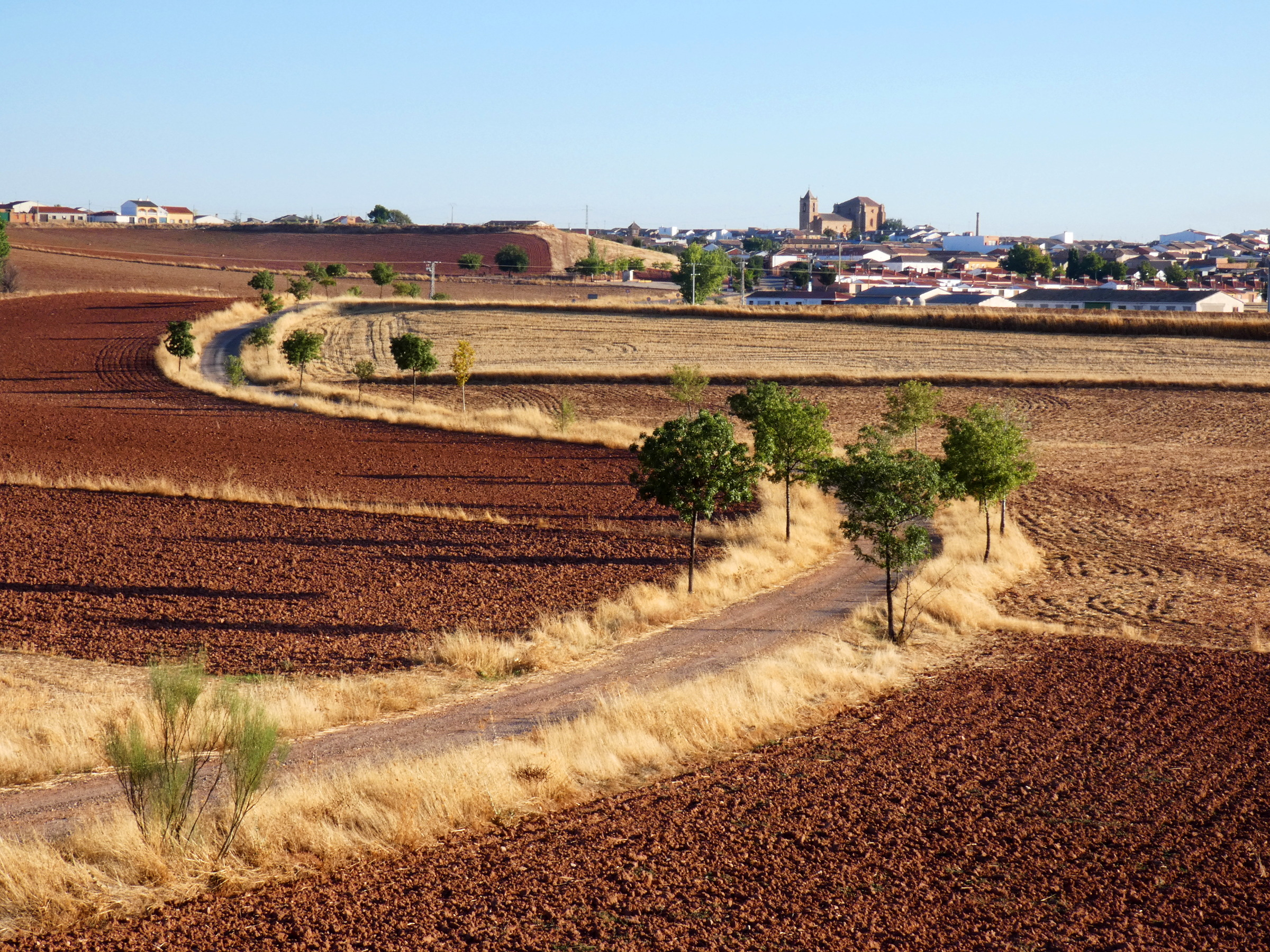
Torre de Juan Abad

Following its transition to democracy, Spain was divided into autonomous communities. The autonomous community of Castile-La Mancha was formally created in 1982 and comprises the provinces of Albacete, Ciudad Real, Cuenca, Guadalajara, and Toledo. Currently, there are no regionalist parties in La Mancha with any electoral significance. However, some institutions in the autonomous community only include the four "provinces of La Mancha." For example, the university district of Castile-La Mancha does not include Guadalajara, which is part of the Madrid district. Similarly, Caja Castilla-La Mancha was formed by the merger of the savings banks of the provinces of Castile-La Mancha, excluding Caja de Guadalajara.

On December 17, 2022, the I Congress of La Mancha convened, organized by the Institute of Humanistic Studies of Castilla-La Mancha and the La Mancha Importa platform. The congress aimed to promote the academic study and dissemination of the identity, economy, heritage, environment, and geography of La Mancha.

== Physical geography ==
=== Geomorphology ===
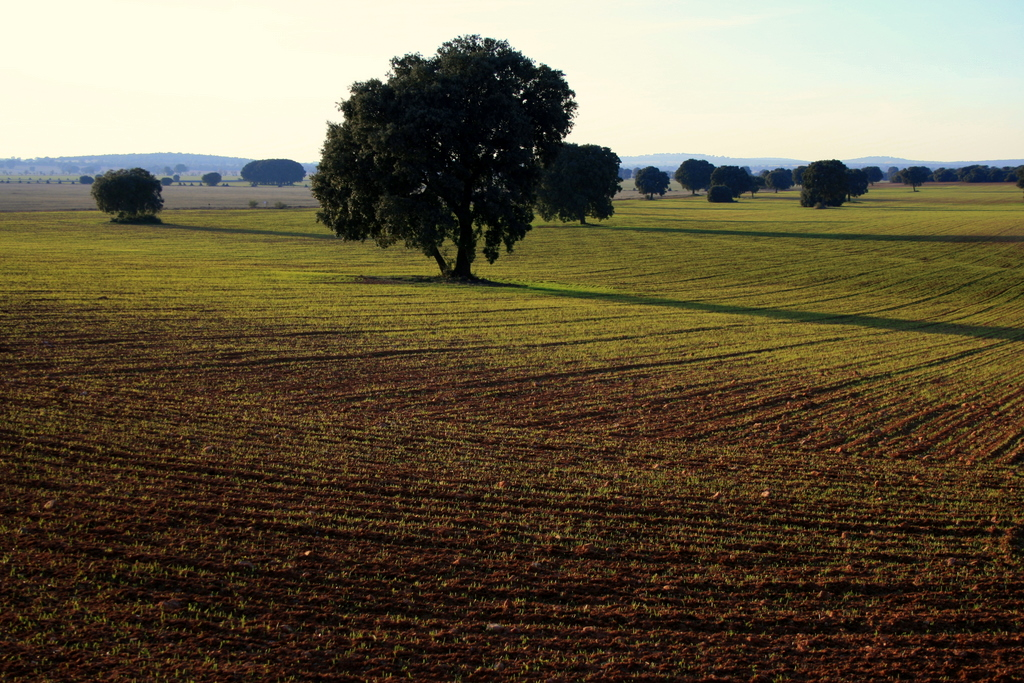
Plain of La Mancha.

La Mancha is a vast plain with an average altitude between 600 and 700 meters (2,000–2,300 ft) above sea level. It was formed by Miocene sediments, which are mainly limestone and marl, as well as clay and conglomerates from the Pliocene-Quaternary glacis. These sediments cover the Paleozoic base of quartzites and phyllites and form some isolated hills. La Mancha's defining feature is its plain terrain, which is not connected to any foothills or mountain ranges.

=== Hydrography ===
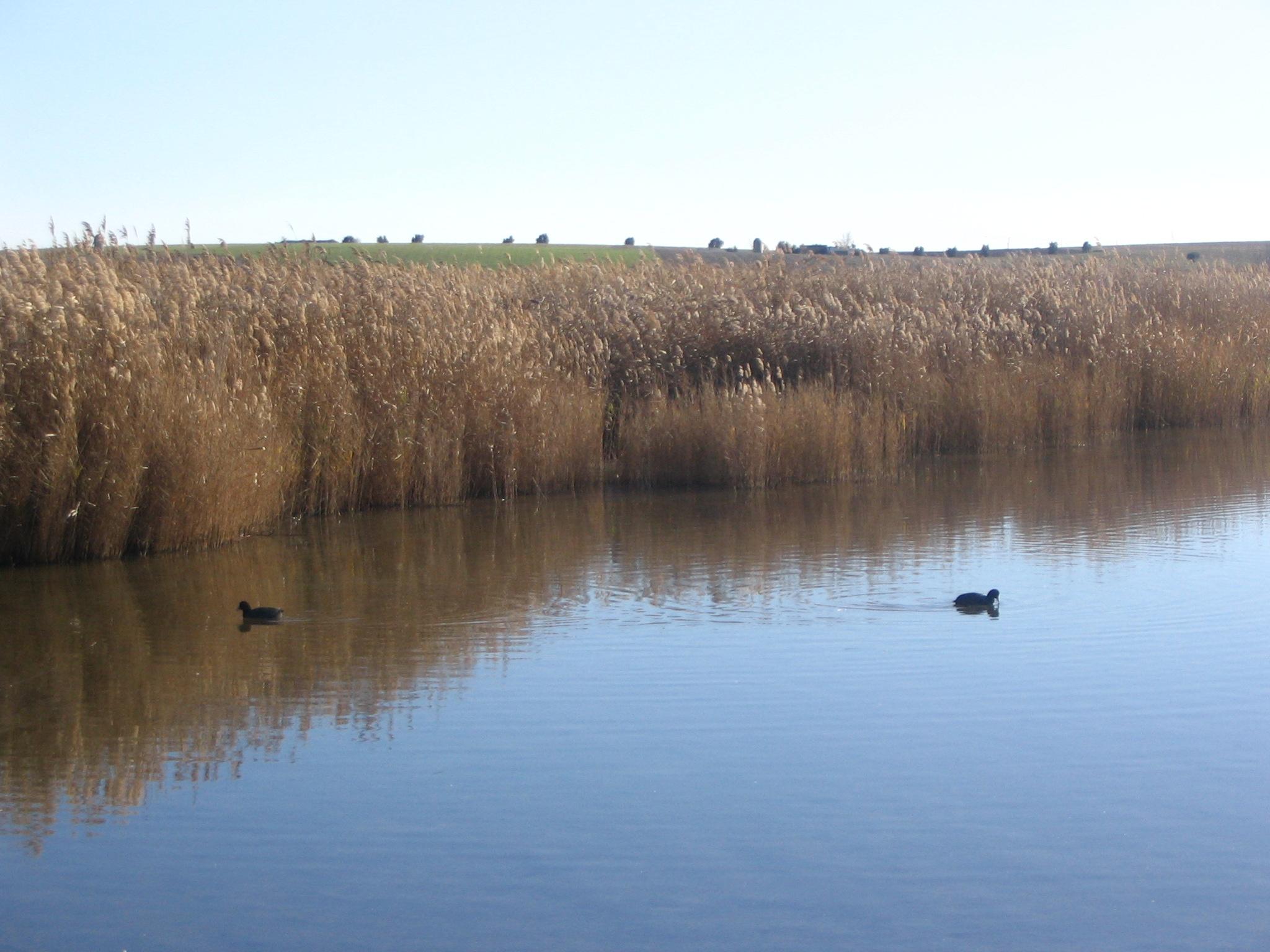
The Tablas de Daimiel.

La Mancha is located across the basins of the Tagus, Guadiana, and Guadalquivir rivers, which flow into the Atlantic Ocean, as well as the Júcar River, which flows into the Mediterranean Sea.

The major rivers include the Tagus, the Guadiana, and the Júcar, as well as their tributaries. The right-bank Guadiana tributary is the Gigüela (also known as the Cigüela), which has the Riansares and the Záncara (with the Córcoles River) as its tributaries. The left-bank tributaries are the Azuer and the Jabalón, and the left-bank Júcar tributary is the Cabriel.

Key wetlands include the Tablas de Daimiel National Park and the Lagunas de Ruidera Natural Park, both of which are located along the Guadiana River and are vital for avifauna. Other important wetlands include the Pedro Muñoz–Mota del Cuervo marsh complex, the Pedro Muñoz lagoon, the Alcázar de San Juan lagoons, the Alcahozo lagoon, and the Manjavacas lagoon. All of these wetlands are part of the Mancha Húmeda, a UNESCO biosphere reserve.

=== Climate ===
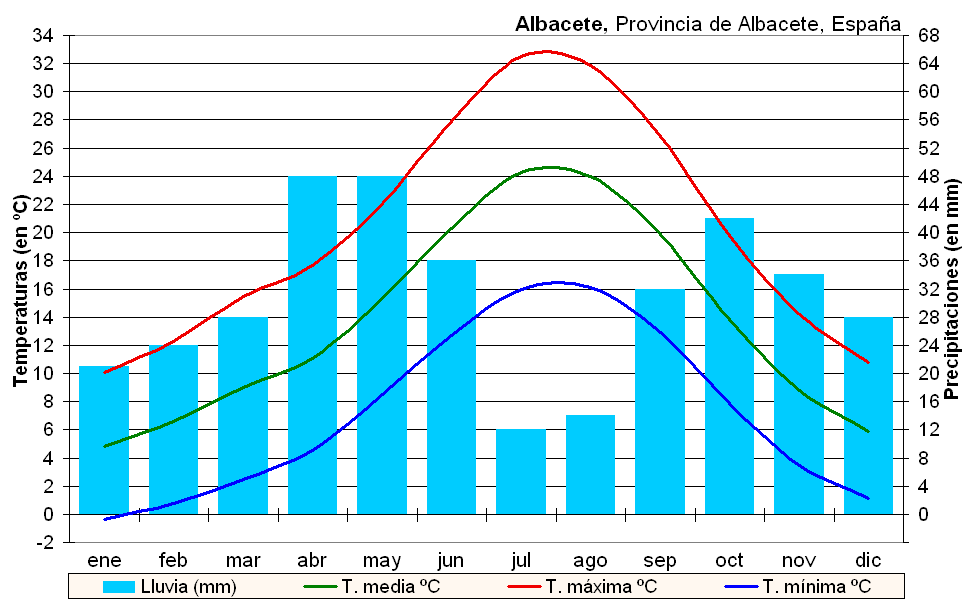
Climograph of Albacete.

La Mancha has a continental Mediterranean climate. Key characteristics include harsh winters, hot summers, summer droughts, irregular precipitation, significant temperature fluctuations, and notable aridity. These characteristics are shaped by the region's latitude, peninsular position, topography, and elevation.

Due to the continental climate, temperatures are very extreme, and the annual temperature range (the difference between the average temperature of the coldest and hottest months) is usually between 18 and 20 °C (64–68 °F). In July, the average temperature exceeds 22 °C (72 °F) across most of the region.

Winters are cold, with January average temperatures falling below 4 °C (39 °F) in some areas, such as Belmonte, which averages 3.4 °C (38.1 °F). Frosts are frequent and extend into early spring and late autumn.

Annual precipitation ranges from 300 to 400 millimeters (12–16 in), peaking in spring and autumn and reaching a minimum in summer. This qualifies most of La Mancha as "dry Spain."

== Demography ==
=== Population distribution and density ===
Municipal population density in Castilla–La Mancha, 2013. La Mancha occupies the center and south. 0–9.99/km^{2} (0.0–25.9/sq mi) 10–19.99/km^{2} (25.9–51.8/sq mi) 20–29.99/km^{2} (51.8–77.7/sq mi) 30–39.99/km^{2} (77.7–103.6/sq mi) 40–49.99/km^{2} (103.6–129.5/sq mi) 50–59.99/km^{2} (129.5–155.4/sq mi) 60–69.99/km^{2} (155.4–181.3/sq mi) 70–79.99/km^{2} (181.3–207.2/sq mi) 80–89.99/km^{2} (207.2–233.1/sq mi) 90–99.99/km^{2} (233.1–259.0/sq mi) > 100/km^{2} (260/sq mi)

Compared to Spain's average population density of 93.39 inhabitants per square kilometer (241.9/sq mi) in 2013, La Mancha exhibits sparse settlement and low population density, with a high concentration around large villages and small cities separated by 10–20 kilometers (6–12 mi). Central La Mancha—the center and northeast of Ciudad Real Province, the southeast of Toledo, the northwest of Albacete, and the southwest of Cuenca—shows intense clustering. Notable towns include Tomelloso (38,900 inhabitants in 2013), Alcázar de San Juan (31,973 inhabitants), and Valdepeñas (30,869 inhabitants) in Ciudad Real; Villarrobledo (26,513 inhabitants) and La Roda (16,398 inhabitants) in Albacete; and Quintanar de la Orden (11,704 inhabitants), Madridejos (11,113 inhabitants), and Consuegra (10,668 inhabitants) in Toledo. Cuenca’s largest central La Mancha town is San Clemente (7,463 inhabitants). Only the cities of Albacete (172,693), Ciudad Real (74,872), and Puertollano (51,550) exceed a population of 50,000. Other cities in Castilla-La Mancha with populations above 50,000—Talavera de la Reina, Guadalajara, Toledo and Cuenca—are not located in La Mancha. Densities reach about 50 inhabitants per square kilometer (130/sq mi) in the northeast of La Mancha in Ciudad Real, dropping to about 30 inhabitants per square kilometer (78/sq mi) to the east.

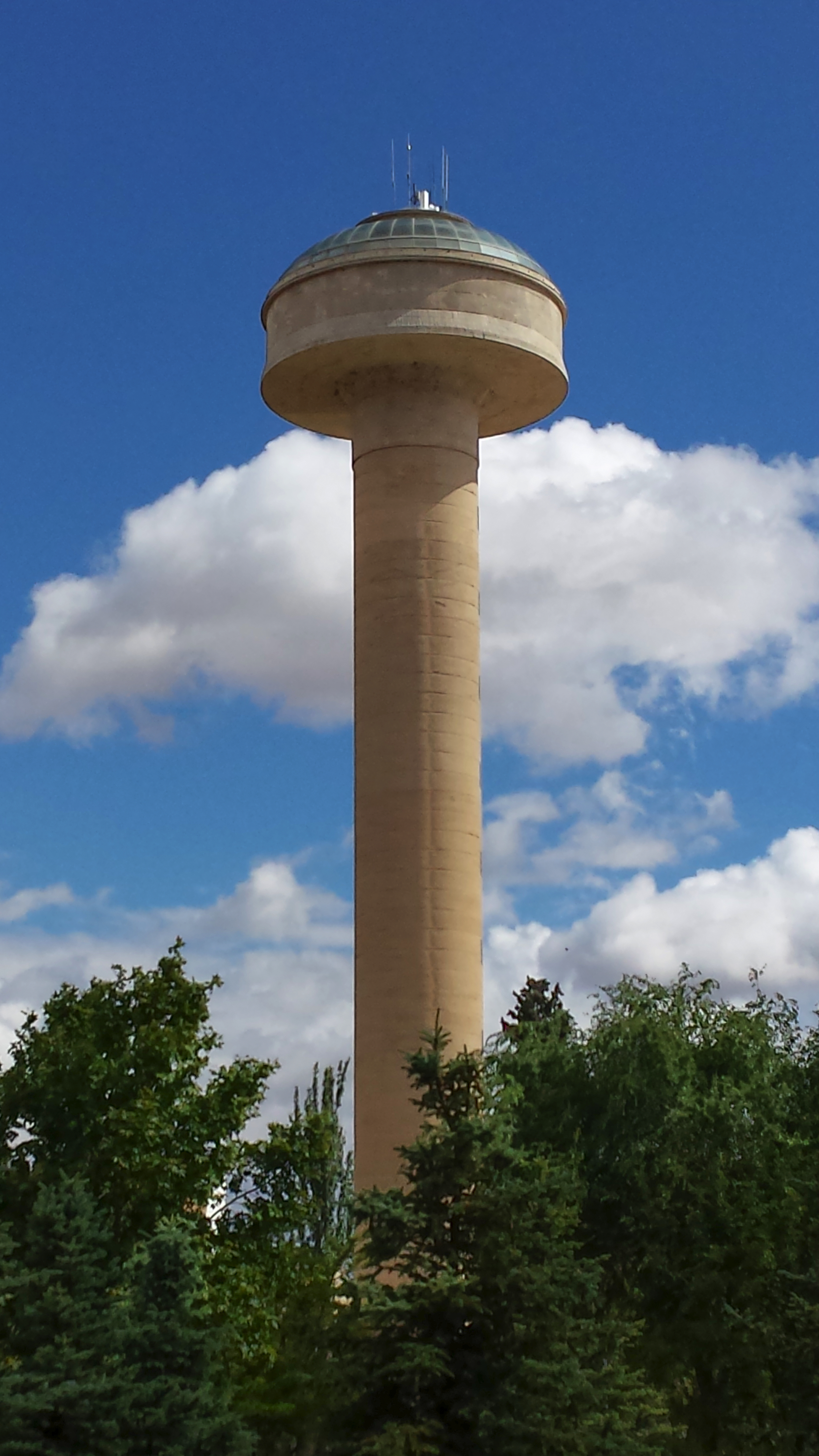
Albacete is by far the most populous city in La Mancha. The image shows the 70-meter-high (230 ft) Fiesta del Árbol Water Tower, one of the symbols of the city.

=== Population evolution ===
La Mancha's population grew via natural increase in the first half of the 20th century. However, a rural exodus occurred in the 1950s–1970s, which concentrated residents in large villages and provincial capitals. Many people, especially youth, emigrated to industrialized regions such as Madrid, Catalonia, and the Valencian Community, or abroad. The population declined and the population of rural areas aged. The exodus slowed in the 1980s and 1990s, enabling slight growth. This growth accelerated in the late 1990s and 2000s due to foreign immigration.

== Economy ==
La Mancha has traditionally been agrarian, with an economy and industry generally below Spain's average.

=== Agriculture and livestock ===
D.O. and IGP agricultural products named “La Mancha”: -Designation of Origin “La Mancha” (wine production area) -Designation of Origin “Azafrán de La Mancha” -Protected Geographical Indication “Melón de La Mancha” Wine Wine and saffron Wine, saffron and melon Saffron Saffron and melon

Historically, agriculture and livestock have dominated. Dryland farming is prevalent, particularly the Mediterranean "trilogy" of cereals, grapes, and olives. Examples of cereals include wheat and barley.

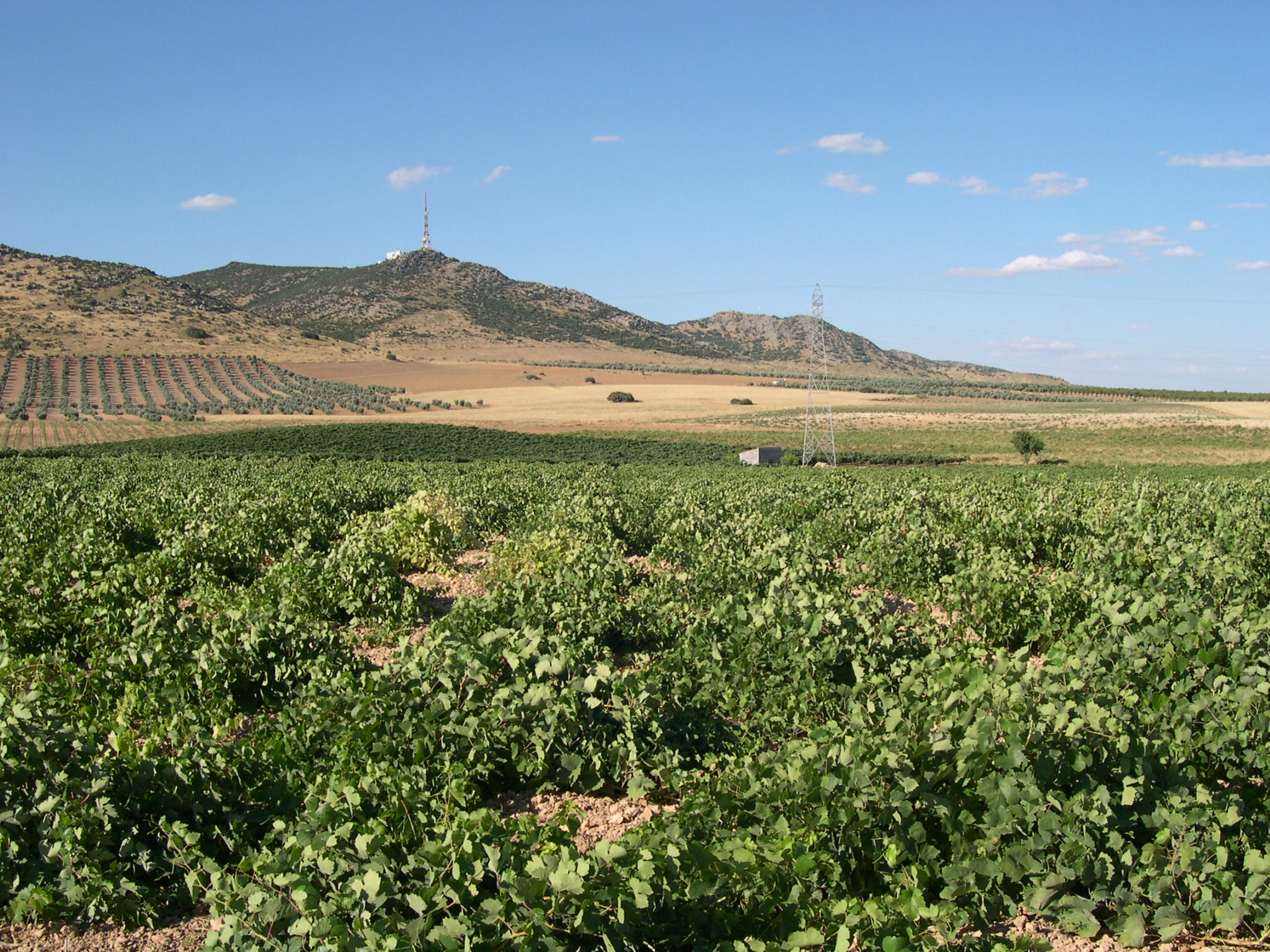
Vineyard in Ciudad Real Province.

La Mancha vineyards are the world's largest by area. The La Mancha DO, which spans parts of Albacete and Cuenca, is the world's largest wine DO, covering 190,980 hectares (471,900 acres) and 182 municipalities. Other wine DOs include Ribera del Júcar and Uclés.

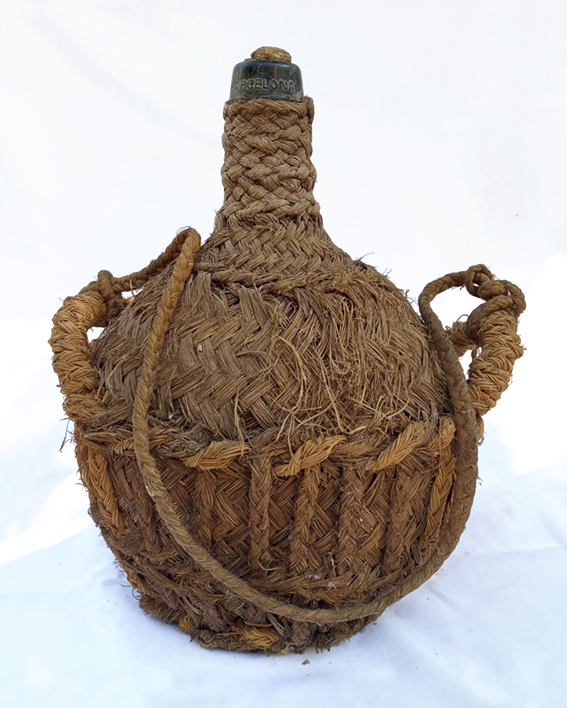
Antique demijohn for storing wine in La Mancha

Saffron cultivation has its own PDO, which covers all of Albacete and parts of Ciudad Real, Cuenca, and Toledo.

The melon has an IGP, "Melón de La Mancha," across thirteen municipalities in Ciudad Real: Alcázar de San Juan, Arenales de San Gregorio, Argamasilla de Alba, Campo de Criptana, Daimiel, Herencia, Los Llanos, Manzanares, Membrilla, Socuéllamos, Tomelloso, Valdepeñas, and Villarta de San Juan.

Other DO products include Campo de Montiel olive oils, Almagro eggplant, and purple garlic from Las Pedroñeras.

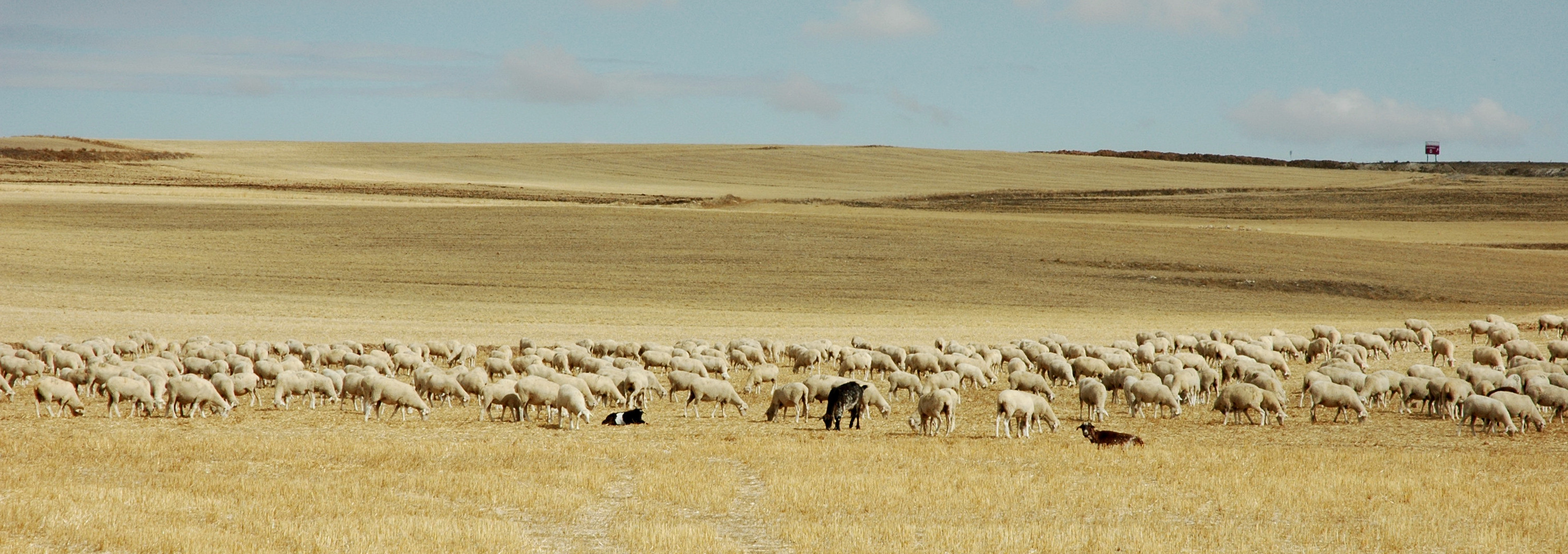
Sheep and goat herd in La Mancha.

Sheep farming is particularly noteworthy in terms of livestock. Along with goat farming, it has produced transhumant herds that have supplied wool, milk, and meat for centuries.

Both Manchego cheese, made from the milk of Manchega sheep, and Manchego lamb have their own designations of origin (DO) and indication of geographical protection (IGP), respectively, across parts of Albacete, Ciudad Real, Cuenca, and Toledo.

Although pig and cattle farming are important, they are much less significant than sheep farming.

=== Industry, mining, and services ===
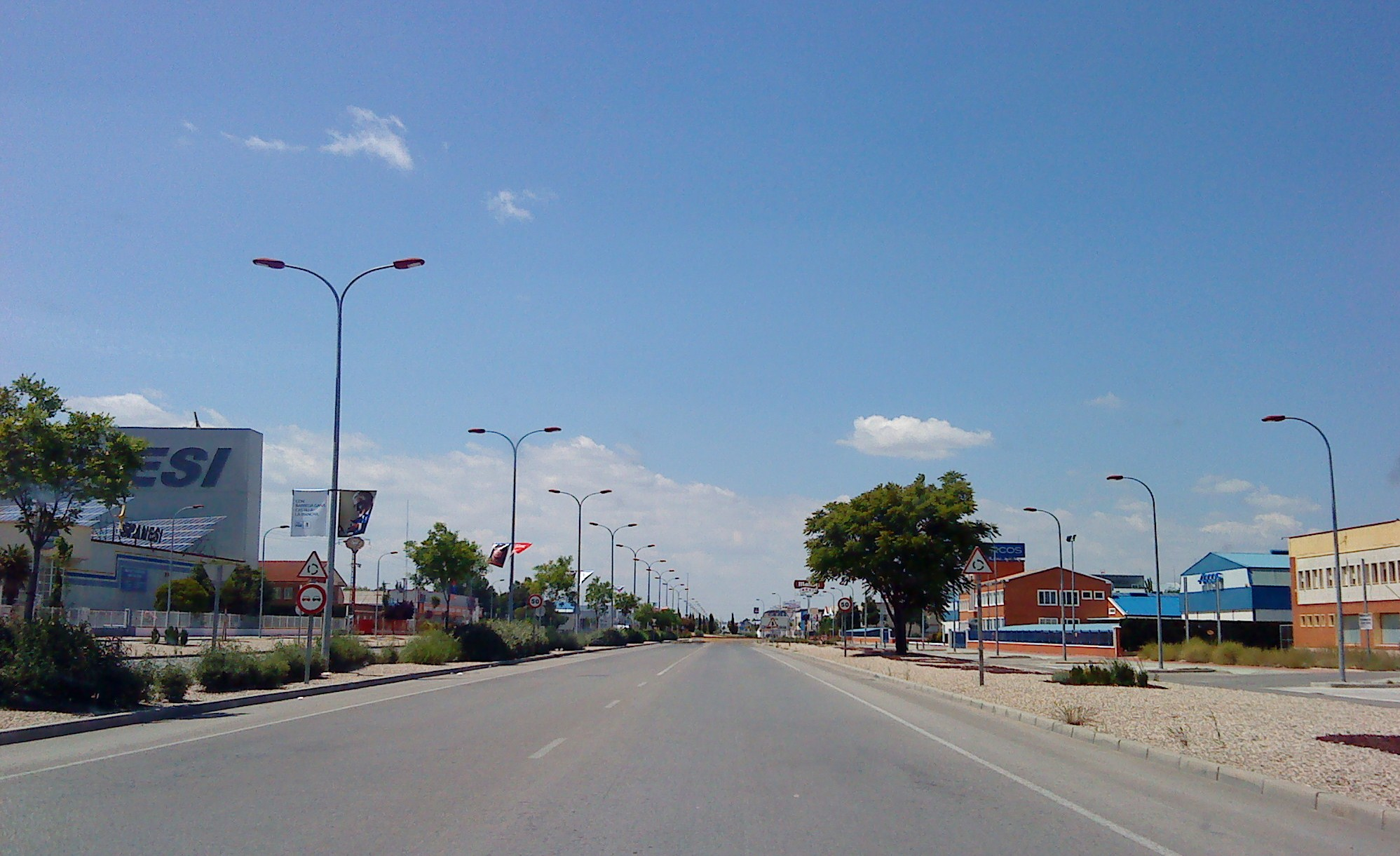
Campollano Industrial Park, Albacete.

La Mancha lacks a strong industrial tradition. The major centers are located around Albacete, Ciudad Real, and Puertollano, and there are food industries throughout the region.

Mining was vital in Puertollano, where coal was mined, and in Almadén, where cinnabar and mercury ore were mined since Roman times.

As in the rest of Spain, the service sector became the key sector of the La Mancha economy during the 20th century. Notably, tourism, especially rural tourism, grew within the service sector.

== Culture ==
=== Architecture ===
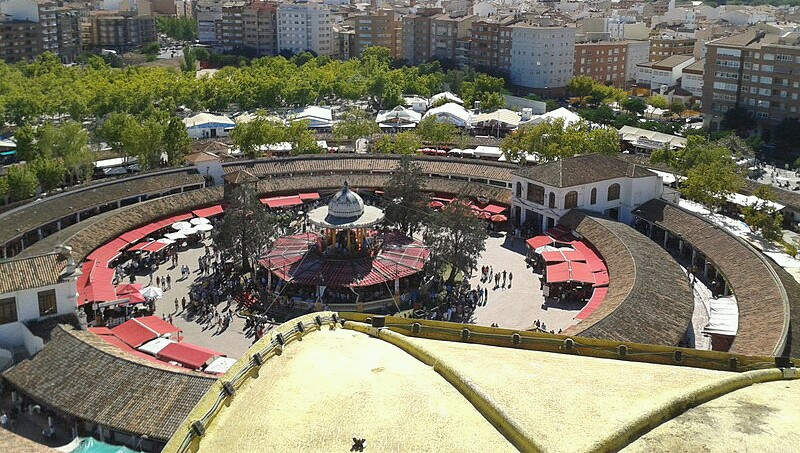
Fair of Albacete, the finest example of traditional architecture in La Mancha

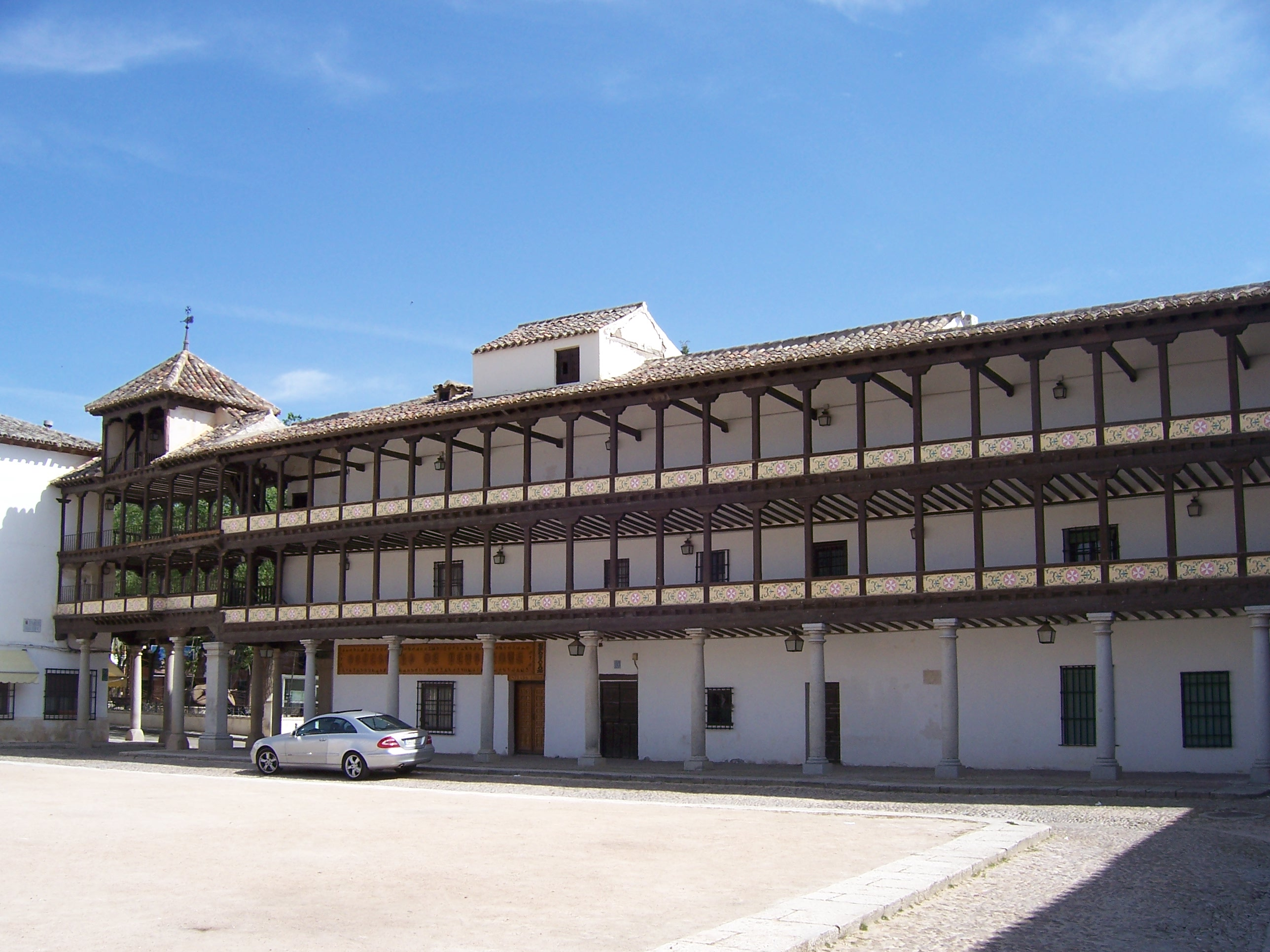
Main Square of Tembleque

The villages of La Mancha are usually large and far apart. They are spread out, and their houses generally consist of a ground floor and a first floor. The villages are typically organized around a main square where the church and town hall are usually located. The church is typically the most prominent building in La Mancha villages and is usually made of stone. Sometimes, it features a mixture of architectural styles. The houses are typically whitewashed with gabled roofs covered in curved tiles. Windmills, stone huts, barns, and inns and taverns are also characteristic of traditional La Mancha architecture.

The popular La Mancha architectural style is preserved in the monumental main squares of various towns throughout the region. However, in many towns, this style has disappeared in recent decades.

=== Dialect ===
Spanish has been the only language spoken in La Mancha since the end of the Reconquista. However, La Mancha Spanish has its own dialectal characteristics that distinguish it from other varieties of the language. It is considered a transitional speech between the northern Castilian dialect and the southern Iberian Peninsula dialects (Andalusian, Extremaduran, and Murcian).

The dialect of La Mancha is not entirely uniform and does not encompass all of Castile-La Mancha. However, it has features that unite it with other Castilian Spanish dialects while setting it apart. One of its most distinctive features is the aspiration of post-vocalic s, which sounds like a voiced /h/ or /x/ (the sound of the letter j in Spanish). This feature, along with the total absence of leísmo and laísmo, distinguishes La Mancha dialects particularly from northern Castilian Spanish. It differs from southern variants in several ways, including the much lower frequency of aspiration or elision of s and z and the clear distinction between s and z.

The La Mancha dialect has a rich vocabulary and its own idioms. It is formed from phonetic variations of standard Spanish words, archaic terms, and words from the Mozarabic, Arabic, and Latin substratum. The dialect also incorporates influences from nearby languages and dialects, including Catalanisms, Valencianisms, Aragoneseisms, and Andalusianisms. Additionally, it has different meanings for words that already exist in standard Spanish and words that are entirely unique, some of which are specific to only a few towns.

There is a wiki about this dialect and its vocabulary focusing on the town of Tomelloso called La Tomepedia. There is also an edition of Antoine de Saint-Exupéry's novel The Little Prince in the La Mancha dialect entitled El Principete.

=== Literature and theater ===
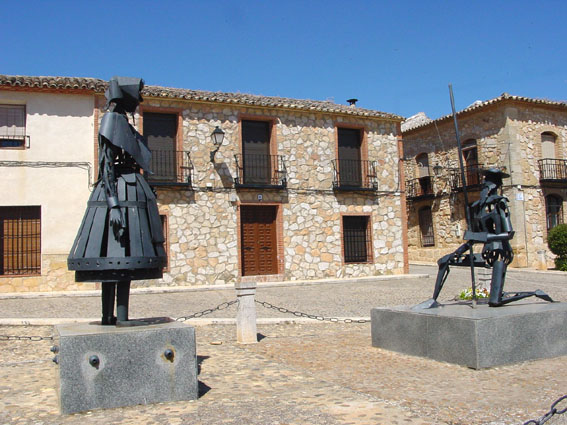
Monument to Dulcinea and Don Quixote in El Toboso.

Much of La Mancha's worldwide fame is owed to Miguel de Cervantes's novel Don Quixote. Written in two parts, the first was published in 1605 and the second in 1615. The story takes place mainly in La Mancha, the homeland of the protagonist, Alonso Quijano. A poor hidalgo, he goes mad from reading chivalric romances and believes himself to be a knight-errant. He calls himself Don Quixote. The novel and its characters, especially Don Quixote, Sancho Panza, and Dulcinea del Toboso, as well as other elements that appear in the novel, such as windmills, have become authentic symbols of La Mancha. Many towns in the region dispute which is the place that Cervantes did not want to remember.

However, Don Quixote is not the only aspect of Spanish Golden Age literature to be found in La Mancha. One of its leading exponents, Francisco de Quevedo, lived out his final years there and died in Villanueva de los Infantes. Almagro's preserved 17th-century corral de comedias symbolizes the importance of theater during that period. The International Classical Theater Festival is held there every year.

==== A literary description ====
Benito Pérez Galdós in Bailén (1873), described his impressions of La Mancha:

Thus, we crossed La Mancha, a lonely region where the sun reigns supreme and where man seems to be the product of nothing but sun and dust. This region is famous throughout the world thanks to the countless depictions of Don Quixote's horse traversing its vast plains. One thing is certain: If La Mancha has any beauty, then it is found in its entirety: its bareness and monotony do not distract or overwhelm the imagination, but rather leave it free, providing space and light in which it can flourish. The greatness of Don Quixote's thoughts can only be understood in the context of the greatness of La Mancha. In a cool, green, mountainous land populated by pleasant shadows, with pretty houses and flowery gardens bathed in warm light and thick atmosphere, Don Quixote could never have existed; he would have died in his prime after his first outing without astonishing the world with the great deeds of his second adventure. Don Quixote needed a horizon, a land without roads that is yet entirely a road; a land without directions where you can go anywhere without going anywhere in particular; a land crisscrossed by paths of chance and adventure where everything that happens seems to be the work of fate or the genies of fable. He needed a sun that melts the brain and drives sane people mad; an endless field where imaginary battle dust rises and conjures up visions of armies of giants, towers and castles in the light. He needed a scarcity of cities, where the presence of a person or animal would be rarer and more extraordinary. He needed silence in calm and the unbridled roar of winds in storms, both equally sad and spreading their sadness to everything. If someone is found in those lonely places, they are immediately considered wretched. He needed, I repeat, a total absence of human works representing positivism, practicality and restrictions on the imagination, which would stop it in its senseless flight. He needed man to leave no more signs of his industry and science in those fields than the patriarchal windmills. They needed only to be seen to resemble restless and furious colossi, calling out from afar and frightening travellers with their threatening gestures.

— Benito Pérez Galdós

=== Festivals and traditions ===
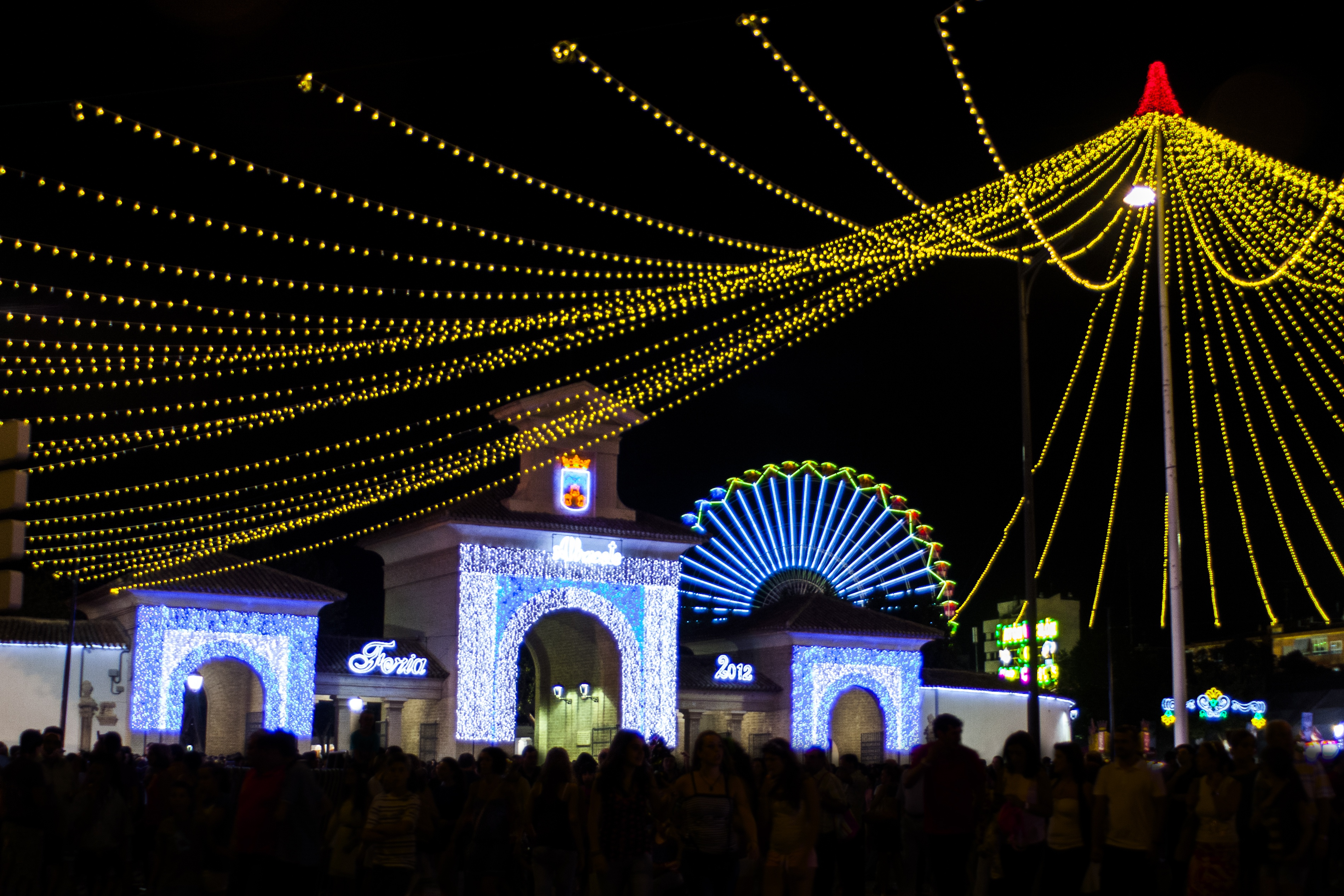
The Albacete Fair, which is of international tourist interest, draws over two million visitors annually.

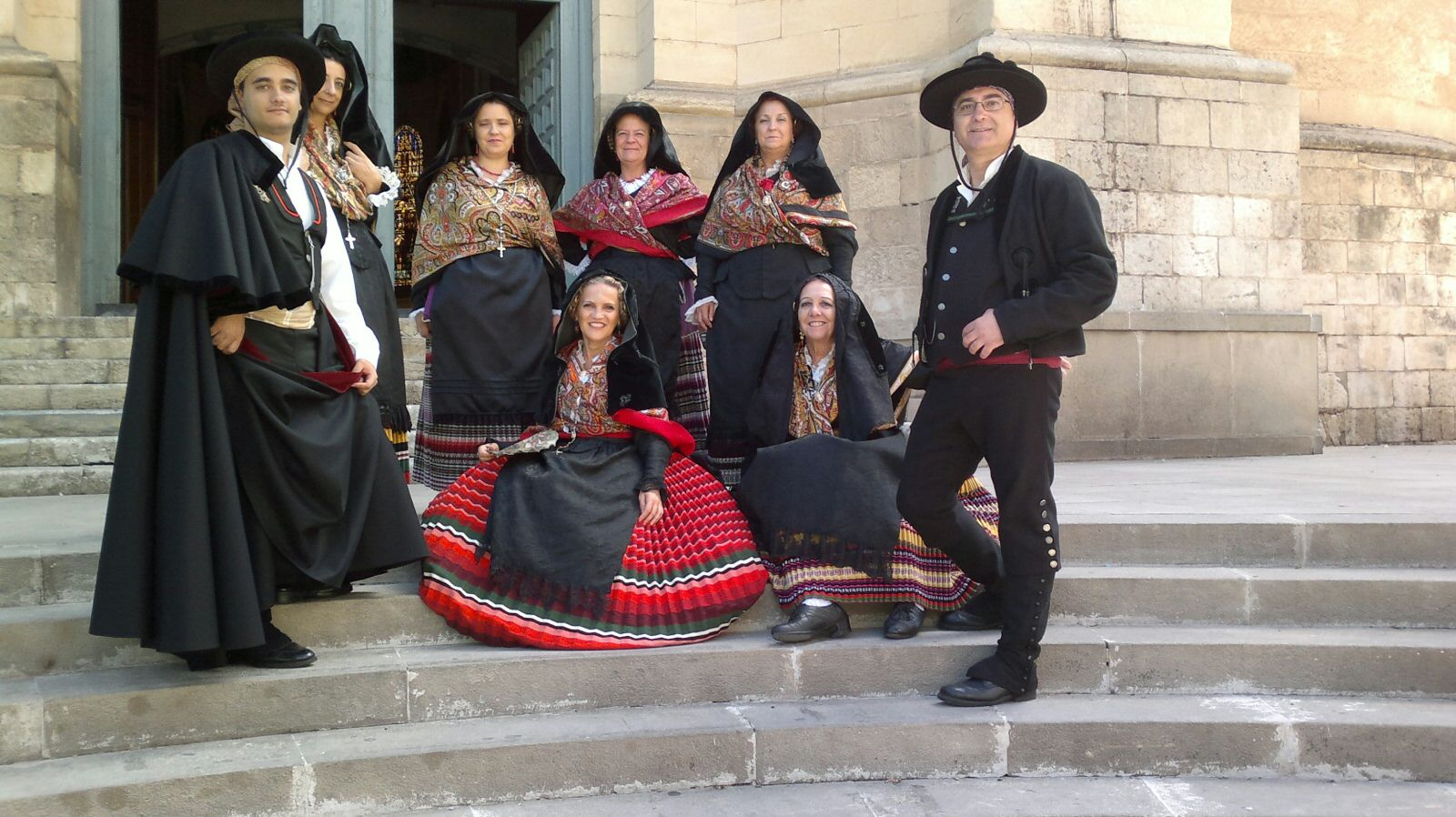
Members of a folk group wearing traditional La Mancha costumes at the Albacete Fair.

Festivities associated with the main events of the Christian calendar are common in the cities and towns of La Mancha. These include:

- Carnival celebrations of national tourist interest include those in Villarrobledo, Herencia, Miguelturra, and Alcázar de San Juan. Those in Tarazona de la Mancha and Villafranca de los Caballeros are of regional tourist interest. Many towns have a tradition of having a picnic in the countryside on Fat Thursday.
- The Holy Week celebrations in Albacete and the Calatrava Passion Route, with its armed guards, are of national tourist interest. Other notable celebrations include those in Bolaños de Calatrava and Almagro. Those of regional tourist interest include the Living Passion in Tarancón and the Juego de las Caras (Game of Faces) in Calzada de Calatrava.
- Corpus Christi, with the Pecados y Danzantes de Camuñas being of national tourist interest.
- The Assumption of the Virgin is a day of celebration in many towns in La Mancha.
- Christmas.

The patronal festivals, which honor the town's patron saint, are also very important. The Albacete Fair, held in honor of the Virgin of Los Llanos, is of international tourist interest. Festivals of national tourist interest include those in honor of Saint Bartholomew in Tarazona de la Mancha, the Traída y la Llevada de la Virgen de Manjavacas in Mota del Cuervo, and La Endiablada in Almonacid del Marquesado. Festivals of regional tourist interest include the Fiesta de las Paces in Villarta de San Juan, the Vitor of Horcajo de Santiago festival (considered the longest procession in Christendom), the Fiestas de Rus in San Clemente, and the Danzantes y Santísimo Cristo de la Viga in Villacañas. These festivals are sometimes accompanied by a pilgrimage, during which the saint, Christ, or Virgin is carried from the main church to a sanctuary or chapel. One example is the Virgen del Monte pilgrimage in Bolaños de Calatrava, where pilgrims camp around the sanctuary and enjoy traditional La Mancha cuisine. Fairground attractions are often set up, and folk dances and songs are performed.

Other festivities originate from the use of agricultural and livestock resources, such as harvests and gatherings, like the grape harvest, or the pig slaughter, or "mataero." The Olive Festival in Mora is of national tourist interest, and the Saffron Rose Festival in Consuegra is of regional tourist interest. In many towns in La Mancha, it is customary to sing May Day songs on April 30. The most well-known are those of Pedro Muñoz, which are of national tourist interest. The Cruces de Mayo (May Crosses) in Villanueva de los Infantes are also of regional tourist interest.

=== Gastronomy ===
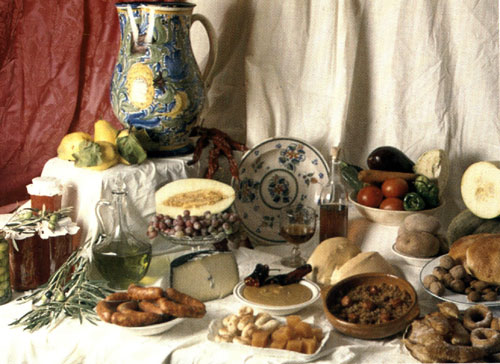
Various products from La Mancha.

Although simple and humble, the cuisine of La Mancha is rich and varied, normally adapted to the region's scarce resources and harsh climate. Many dishes contain vegetables, some almost exclusively, such as pisto manchego, moje, alboronía, and asadillo manchego. Some of the most renowned vegetables are the eggplants and garlic from Almagro and Las Pedroñeras, respectively.

Dishes from La Mancha that include meat are usually made with lamb, pork, or small game, such as rabbits, hares, and partridges, which are raised in abundance in the area. Examples of these dishes include caldereta manchega, a stew, and tojunto, another type of stew. Perdiz escabechada, or marinated partridge, is a particularly noteworthy dish made with game meat. Products from pig slaughter include chorizo, morcilla, and, in the province of Ciudad Real, patatera. Other products include ribs, lomo de orza, and salchichón imperial. Some of these products are used to make duelos y quebrantos. Ajo mataero is typically made on the day of the pig slaughter. A similar dish is morteruelo.

Several dishes are also based on cereals, including gachas manchegas, migas ruleras, and ajoharina. Wheat flour is used to make Cruz bread and torta cenceña. The latter is used to make gazpachos manchegos when combined with game meat.

Potatoes are commonly used in traditional La Mancha cuisine, appearing in dishes such as somallao, tiznao, and atascaburras. The latter two are made with salted cod, one of the few fish found in traditional La Mancha cuisine due to its ease of preservation given the region's distance from the sea. Other common fish are freshwater fish, such as trout. La Mancha cuisine also features legumes, which are found in stews, and mushrooms, such as guíscanos (the local name for red pine mushrooms). Common seasonings include saffron and aromatic herbs, such as rosemary and thyme.

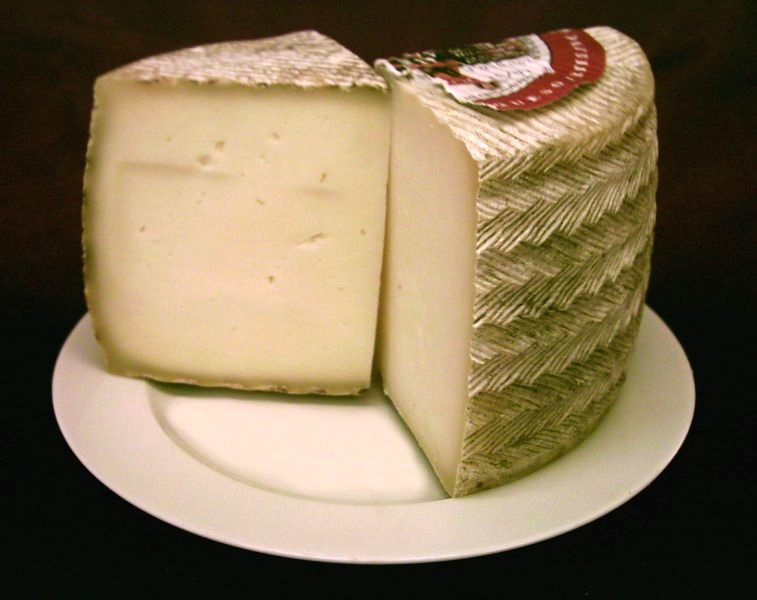
Manchego cheese.

Manchego cheese is made from the milk of Manchega sheep.

These dishes pair well with regional wines. Wine is also the basis for other traditional beverages, such as cuerva and zurra.

Pastries in La Mancha are rich in fritters, such as fried flowers, hojuelas, pestiños, leche frita, French toast, tortilla de rodilla, and sweet rolls. Sponge cakes are also made, including bizcocho borracho and tortas de Alcázar. In the Ciudad Real area, barquillos are typical. In the province of Albacete, miguelitos from La Roda are particularly popular.

=== Music and dance ===
The Seguidilla Manchega is the traditional song and dance of La Mancha. However, because La Mancha has always been a melting pot, other styles are also popular. These include the Jota Manchega, Torrás, Malagueñas, Fandangos, Rondeñas, Canciones de Ronda, Canciones de Quintos, Canciones de Laboreo, May Day songs, Aguilanderos, and Villancicos. These songs are accompanied by various instruments, including the classical guitar, bandurria, lute, dulzaina, drum, castanets, zambomba, and tambourine—especially for Christmas carols. Simple instruments not originally intended for music, such as botella de anís, mortars, and pestles, are also used in the paloteo dance.

== See also ==
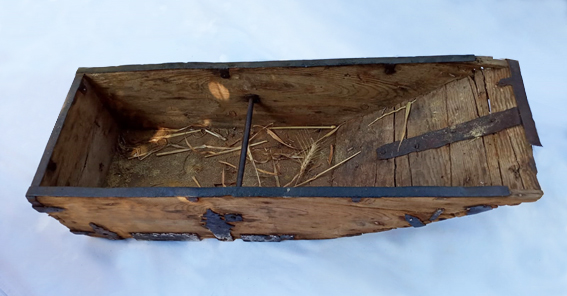
Fanega measure in La Mancha

- Don Quixote
- Mancheguian regionalism
- Manchuela ("lesser La Mancha"), a comarca in La Mancha.
- La Mancha (DO), a Spanish Denominación de Origen (DO) for wines.
- Manchego, a type of cheese made in La Mancha.
- Manche, a coastal department in Normandy, France.
- The English Channel, known in Spanish as Canal de la Mancha.

== Bibliography ==
- Imprenta Real (1789) "España Dividida en Provincias e Intendencias (Orden de S.M. por el Conde de Floridablanca, 22 de marzo de 1785) Ministerio de Estado.
- Cano Valero, José, et al. (1999): Historia de la Provincia de Albacete. Editorial Azacanes. Toledo.
- Díaz Sánchez-Ajofrín, Ángel (2021): "Aproximación a la historia política de la Mancha de Montaragón en época bajomedieval (S. XIV)". Universidad de Alicante, Alicante.
- López-Salazar Pérez, Jerónimo (2005): "El mundo rural en La Mancha cervantina: labradores e hidalgos". La Monarquía Hispánica en tiempos del Quijote (coord.: Sanz Camañes, Porfirio). Sílex Ediciones. Madrid. Págs. 17-27.
- Medrano y Treviño, Diego (1841) Consideraciones sobre el Estado Económico, Moral y Político de la Provincia de Ciudad Real. Instituto de Estudios Manchegos, Patronato José Mª. Quadrado del CSIC. Ed. FACSÍMIL de la Dip. Prov. de C.Real. Año 1972.
- Petrel Marín, Aurelio (1984): "En torno al concepto y límites de un topónimo olvidado: La Mancha de Montaragón", Congreso de Historia de Albacete, Volumen II. Instituto de Estudios Albacetenses. Albacete. Págs. 263-271.
- Petrel Marín, Aurelio y Rodríguez Llopis, Manuel (1998): El Señorío de Villena en el Siglo XIV. Instituto de Estudios albacetenses "Don Juan Manuel" de la Excma. Diputación de Albacete. Albacete.
- Antonio Bonet Correa (20 December 1990). Fiesta, poder y arquitectura. Ediciones AKAL. ISBN 978-84-7600-496-8.
