= Mancheguian regionalism =

Actualization of the Mancheguian flag, eliminating the Alfonso XIII coat of arms

Mancheguian regionalism (Spanish: Regionalismo manchego) is a minoritarian political current in Spain that proposes the existence of a differentiated historical region in La Mancha with its proper legal entity, against the Pancastilian thesis that considers Castile as a unique nation or region. Very minority currents inside the Mancheguian Regionalism supports to go beyond the regionalism by a total rupture with Spain.

== Historic background ==
=== The 19th century Mancheguismo ===
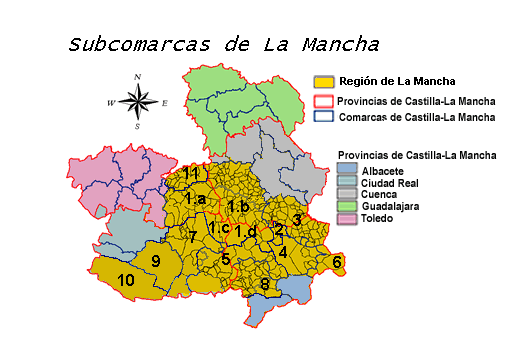
The region of La Mancha.

The first attempt to constitute a legally separate and distinct reality is related to the minority federalist movement. In the midst of political turmoil caused by the " Glorious Revolution "in September 1869, delegates of the Federal Republican Party in the provinces of Albacete, Ciudad Real, Cuenca and Toledo, among whom were prominent local leaders such as José María Villamar federalism (Alcázar de San Juan) and Juan Molero (Ciudad Real), signed in Alcázar de San Juan the Federal Pact Manchego. However, the representatives of federalism in these provinces, along with those in Madrid and Guadalajara, had signed in June of that year the Federal Pact Castilian, showing the duality that has existed between the forces of regionalism and the Spanish state.

The federal formula again reactivated on the occasion of the proclamation of the First Republic, when the pictures Republicans went to work to organize their bases and work towards the consolidation of the new system. So has the meeting for this purpose were some members of the Federal Board in early March 1873. So they decided to form a sort of permanent committee based in Alcázar de San Juan. The abrupt end of the First Republic ended the federalist proposals.

=== The 20th century Mancheguismo ===
Mancheguismo crossed another milestone with the establishment in Madrid of the official Regional Centre for Manchego in 1906 and between their aspirations was the "foster ties of solidarity among the four provinces of Albacete, Ciudad Real, Cuenca and Toledo." To this end, the centre launched a campaign for various populations of the four provinces trying to get membership of the idea. They even created a banner representing the region and a hymn dedicated to her. On August 2, 1906, Manchego Regional Centre held a rally at the Red Theater Toledo seeking the establishment of a local board in the city.

Years later, after the approval of Provincial Associations Act, there was talk of creating a Commonwealth of La Mancha. A meeting in Valdepeñas in 1914 rejected the idea that the four provinces in which they dealt La Mancha can join in the Spanish association and supported the formation of another Mancha. In 1919, at a meeting of the Central Youth Manchega held in Madrid, agreed to ask the county councils of Ciudad Real, Cuenca and Toledo that "giving away any intelligence with Castile and, by contrast, was brought under Albacete her sister to implement a Commonwealth of La Mancha, forming a political-administrative region with its own character. "

The Mancheguismo was an issue that was present, with greater or lesser extent, to the dictatorship of Primo de Rivera. Regionalist proclamations continued during the first months of the dictatorship of Primo de Rivera. Shortly after the delivery of Primo de Rivera Valdepeñas a newspaper published an article that presented a "new territorial division of Spain."

In Francoist Spain there existed agencies including the provinces of La Mancha, as the Economic Association Interprovincial de La Mancha ( 1962 ).

During the Spanish transition to democracy was different mancheguistas associations, like the aforementioned Manchego Popular Movement, which in its eagerness to try the provinces of Toledo, Cuenca, Ciudad Real and Albacete Mancha form a self-maintained contacts with other regional groupings such as Community Castellana. However, it also emerged in parallel with initiatives to create an autonomous region comprising the provinces of Castilla La Nueva and Albacete province to be named the South Castilla, the main proponents of this prototype of autonomy would Castilianist as Juan Pablo Mañueco and parties like the PANCAL. However, the decisive opposition Antonio Fernández-Galiano, which eventually would be elected president to autonomous region of Madrid was part of the new community to address the risk that engulf the communities and surrounding provinces led to the current Castilla-La Mancha entity.

== See also ==
- Nationalities and regions of Spain
- Nationalisms and regionalisms of Spain
- Politics of Spain: The nationality debate

== Bibliography ==
- Castellanos López, José Antonio: El Regionalismo Pre-Democrático en una Región sin Conciencia Histórica. Los primeros brotes regionalistas en Castilla-La Mancha en Seminario de Estudios del Franquismo y la Transición. Universidad de Castilla-La Mancha, Albacete, 2004. On-line version
- Castellanos López, José Antonio: El Regionalismo y la Comunidad Autónoma en Seminario de Estudios del Franquismo y la Transición. Universidad de Castilla-La Mancha, Albacete, 2004. On-line version
- Fuster Ruiz, Francisco: Para una historia del regionalismo manchego :la bandera y el himno de La Mancha en Revista Al-Basit, año VII, número 31, pp. 5– 27. Instituto de Estudios Albacetenses, Albacete, 1981. On-line version
- García Bresó, Javier: Cultura y pertenencia en Castilla-La Mancha en Biblioteca Añil. Celeste Ediciones, Madrid, 2000.
- VV. AA.: La Aventura de la Historia. Así se hizo España (IV): Castilla-La Mancha. Unidad Editorial, Madrid, 2007.
