= Pozorrubio de Santiago =

Pozorrubio, Spain
- municipality
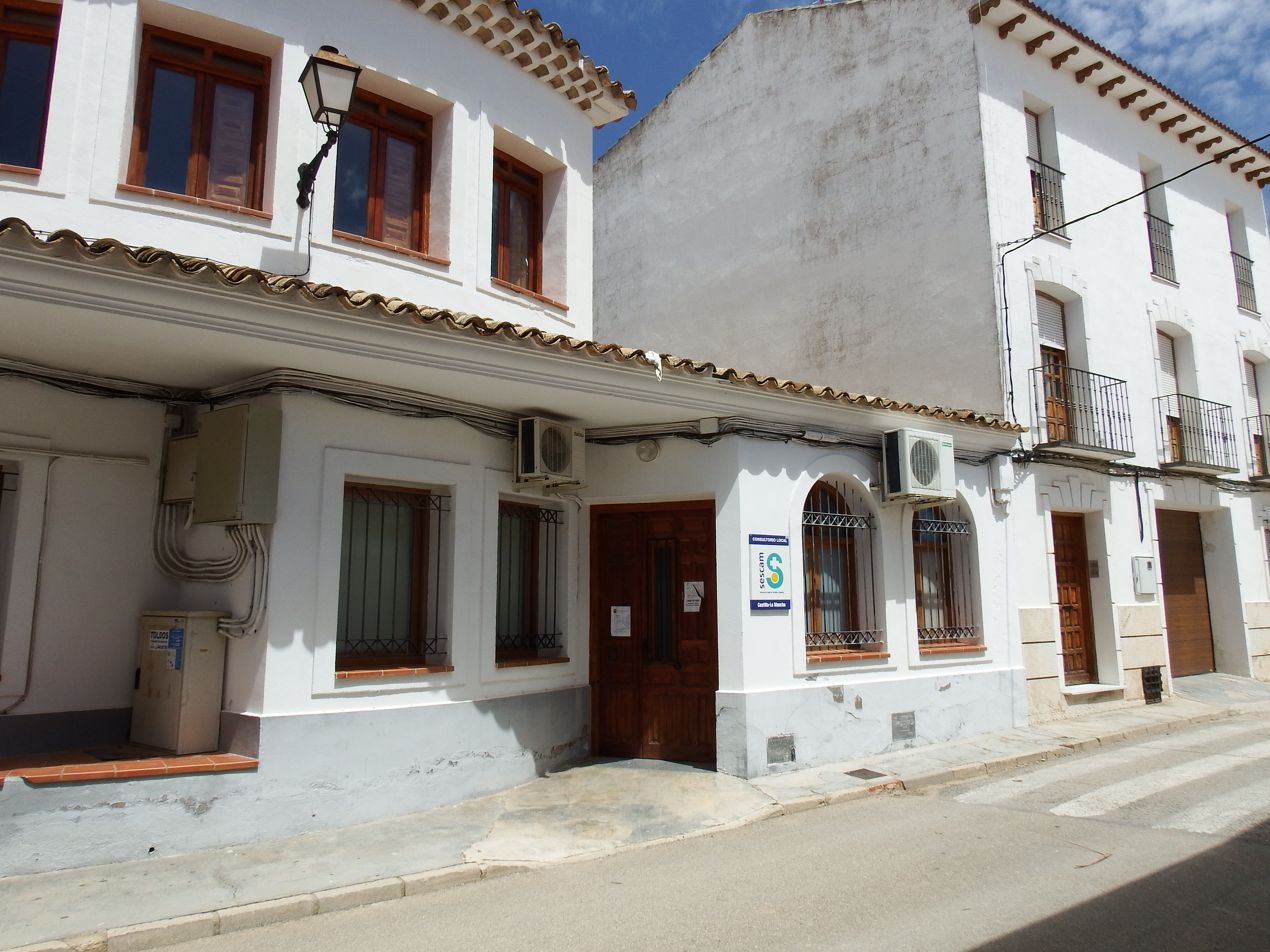
- Town Hall

- Flag Coat of arms

- Location within Spain Location within Castilla-La Mancha
- Coordinates: 39°49′N 2°57′W
- Country: Spain
- Autonomous community: Castile-La Mancha
- Province: Cuenca
- Municipality: Pozorrubio

Area
  - Total: 44 km^{2} (17 sq mi)

Population (2025-01-01)
  - Total: 307
  - Density: 7.0/km^{2} (18/sq mi)
- Time zone: UTC+1 (CET)
  - Summer (DST): UTC+2 (CEST)

Pozorrubio de Santiago is a municipality located in the province of Cuenca, Castile-La Mancha, Spain. According to the 2004 census (INE), the municipality has a population of 446 inhabitants.
