= Santa María de los Llanos =

Santa María de los Llanos, Spain
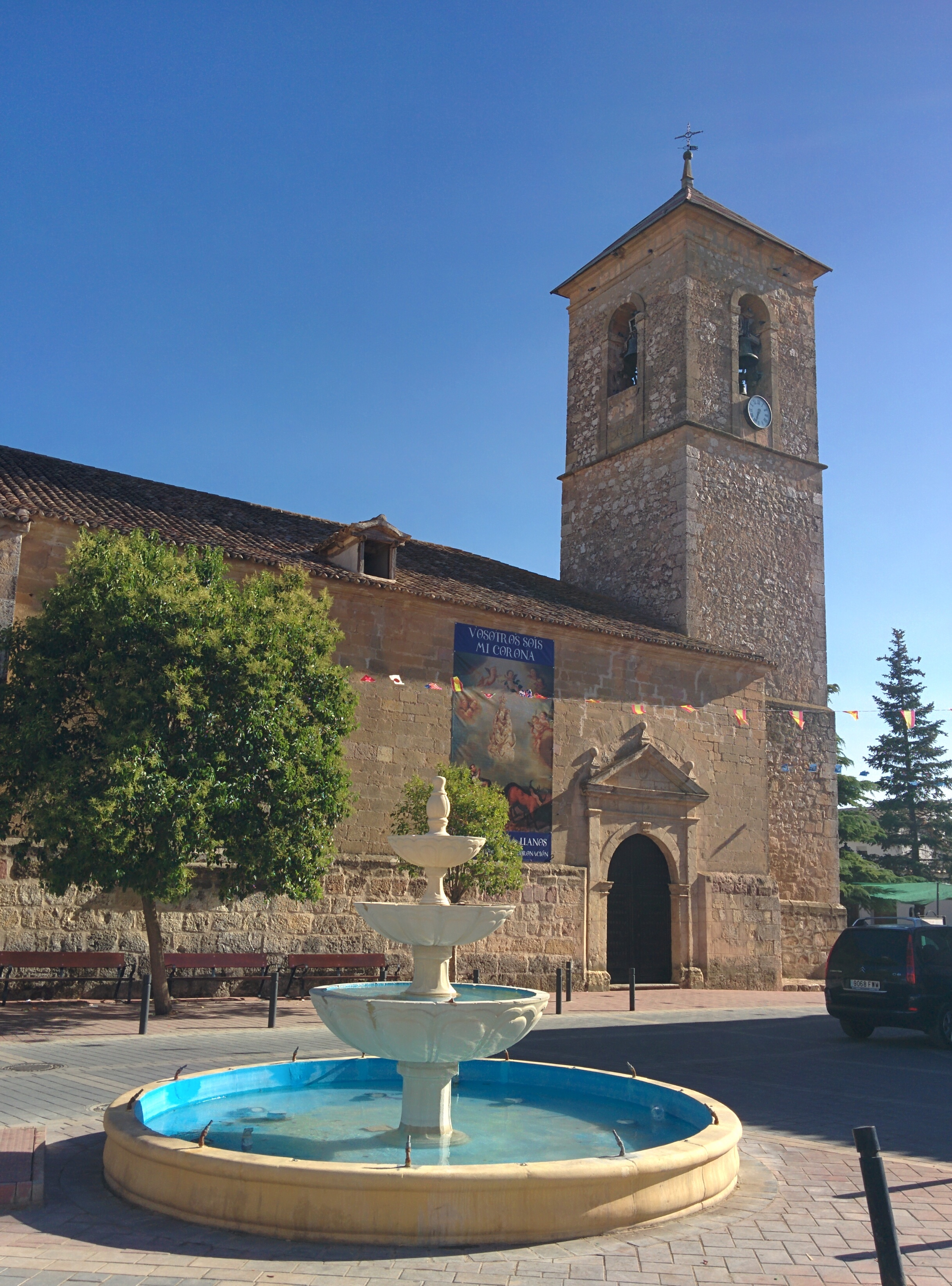

- Flag Coat of arms

- Location in Spain. Santa María de los Llanos, Spain (Castilla-La Mancha)
- Coordinates: 39.4956°N 2.8089°W
- Country: Spain
- Autonomous community: Castile-La Mancha
- Province: Cuenca
- Municipality: Santa María de los Llanos

Area
  - Total: 42 km^{2} (16 sq mi)

Population (2025-01-01)
  - Total: 660
  - Density: 16/km^{2} (41/sq mi)
- Time zone: UTC+1 (CET)
  - Summer (DST): UTC+2 (CEST)

Santa María de los Llanos is a municipality located in the province of Cuenca, Castile-La Mancha, Spain. According to the 2004 census (INE), the municipality has a population of 798 inhabitants.
