= Cabezamesada =

Coordinates: 39°49′N 3°06′W

- municipality
- Flag Coat of arms

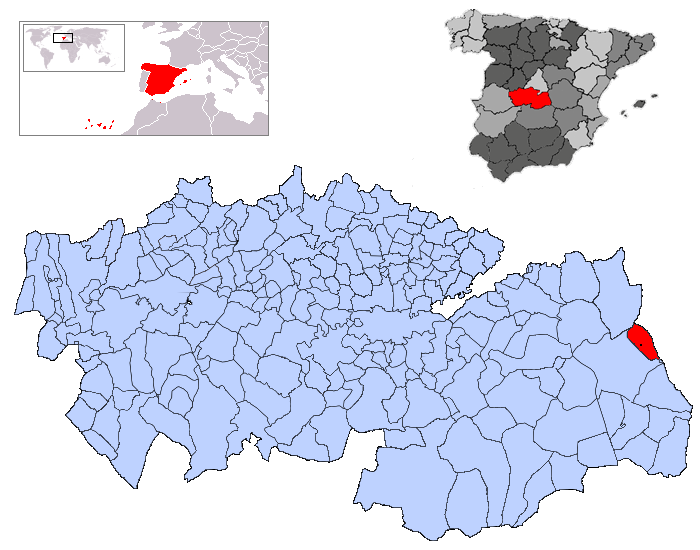
- Country: Spain
- Autonomous community: Castile-La Mancha
- Province: Toledo
- Municipality: Cabezamesada

Area
  - Total: 60 km^{2} (23 sq mi)
- Elevation: 744 m (2,441 ft)

Population (2025-01-01)
  - Total: 343
  - Density: 5.7/km^{2} (15/sq mi)
- Time zone: UTC+1 (CET)
  - Summer (DST): UTC+2 (CEST)

Cabezamesada is a municipality located in the province of Toledo, Castile-La Mancha, Spain. According to the 2006 census (INE), the municipality has a population of 469 inhabitants.

== Demographics ==
Historical population
Year	Pop.	±%
1900	969	—
1910	1,039	+7.2%
1920	1,119	+7.7%
1930	1,261	+12.7%
1940	1,405	+11.4%
1950	1,532	+9.0%
1960	1,342	−12.4%
1970	966	−28.0%
1981	704	−27.1%
1991	581	−17.5%
2001	494	−15.0%
2011	546	+10.5%
2021	330	−39.6%
2023	356	+7.9%
Source: ISTAT
