= Los Hinojosos =

- Municipality
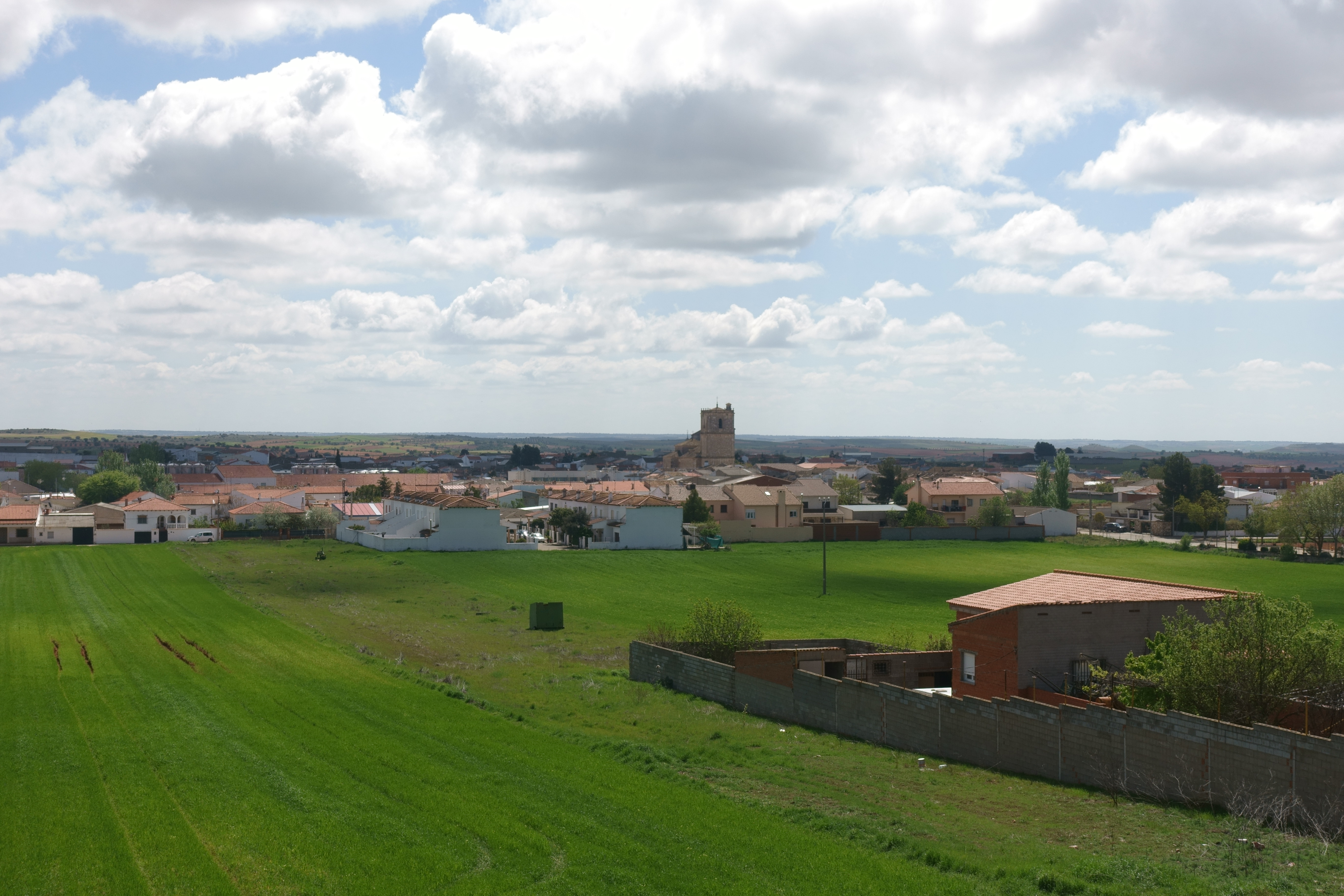
- Los Hinojosos - Partial view

- Flag Coat of arms

- Location within Spain Location within Castilla-La Mancha
- Coordinates: 39°36′15″N 2°49′33″W
- Country: Spain
- Autonomous community: Castile-La Mancha
- Province: Cuenca

Population (2025-01-01)
  - Total: 702
- Time zone: UTC+1 (CET)
  - Summer (DST): UTC+2 (CEST)

Los Hinojosos is a municipality in located in the province of Cuenca, Castile-La Mancha, Spain. It has a population of 902 (2014).
