= Via XXXI =

Itinerary of Antonine A-31

Itinerary of Antoninus A-31 Item to Laminium, alio itinere Cæsarea Augusta

Route information
- History: Roman Empire
- Component highways: A-31
- Tourist routes: Caput fluminis Anae; Libisosa; Parietinis; Saltigi; Ad Putea; Valebonga; Urbiaca; Albonica; Agiria; Carae; Sermone

The item to Laminio, alio itinere Cæsarea Augusta, as it appears in the original document, or Antonine Itinerary A-31, according to the nomenclature adopted by Eduardo Saavedra to classify the Roman roads of Hispania that appear in that document, is a communication route of Ancient Rome through the current Iberian Peninsula. Of all the Hispanic itineraries, this is one of the most difficult to reconstruct since most of its points of passage have not yet been fully established, among them Laminio, the city of origin, and there are notable discrepancies within the scientific community.

== History ==
Despite the difficulty of knowing its route in situ, it is one of the routes that best illustrates the character and nature of the Itinerary of Antonine. At first it was thought that the roads contained in this document were unitary routes that directly linked point A to point B, known by their names, in the manner of today's roads. The fact that the only well known section of the A-31 is the one that uses a small part of the Via Augusta, one of the best known of ancient Hispania, while the rest of the road network used is an unknown quantity, leads us to think that, in reality, the routes of Antonine are routes in which several of those unitary roads are used.

== Route ==
Only the section of this route that uses the Via Augusta between Libisosa (today Lezuza) and Saltigi (today Chinchilla de Monte-Aragón), in the current province of Albacete, reaches full agreement among all the authors. Between the two, it has been proposed the location of the mansio known as Parietinis, near Paredazos Viejos, in the site known as Ventorro de la Vereda, located in the vicinity of the road and at the approximate distance between Chinchilla and Lezuza, suggested by the itinerary. Its origin is unknown since there are severe discrepancies about the location of the municipium of Laminio, the starting point of the itinerary. If we stick to the distances expressed in the document, 21 m. p. (approx. 31 km.), it is completely impossible for it to be outside the province of Albacete, where various locations have been suggested in the municipalities of Villarrobledo, Munera, El Bonillo or Ossa de Montiel. However, most of the scientific community insists on locating Laminio in Alhambra (Ciudad Real) at about 70 km. or even in Daimiel at about 100 km.

Nor is there full agreement on the direction of this route from Chinchilla. From there, some authors take it through the provinces of Cuenca and Teruel, up to Zaragoza, while others ignore the province of La Mancha and divert the route through Valencia.

A final difficulty is the distance traveled to its destination (Zaragoza), although there is no doubt about the location of this city. Whichever route is chosen, it always falls short, so it has been assumed that the route would end at a junction with another Itinerary of Antonine, another route, an administrative border, etc.

Itinerario A-31: item to Laminio, alio itinere Cæsarea Augusta
Stage	Distance (in roman miles)	Current position	Comments
Laminio	0	unknown	Location very disputed. It is speculated that there are several sites in the provinces of Albacete and Ciudad Real.
Caput fluminis Anae	14 Libisosa and 10 Mentesa	unknown	Literally translated as 'towards the source of the Guadiana'. Possibly located somewhere in the northwest of the province of Albacete.
Libisosa	13	Lezuza	Always known.
Parietinis	21	Ventorro de la Vereda, in Paerazos Viejos (Albacete)	Correctly located by Saavedra himself in 1862 and archaeologically confirmed by Sillieres.
Saltigi	15	Chinchilla de Monte-Aragón	It has always been known. The current name of Chinchilla derives from the pre-Roman Saltigi, through Latin, Arabic, Mozarabic and Castilian.
Ad putea	32	unknown	Several locations have been suggested such as Pozoamargo.
Valebonga	40	unknown	Several locations have been suggested, including, due to phonetic similarity, Valdeganga, pedanía de Valdetórtola and the municipality of Valdeganga (Albacete).
Urbiaca	20	unknown	Several locations have been suggested, including the Roman villa of Noheda.
Albonica	25	unknown	Several locations have been suggested.
Agiria	5	unknown	Several locations have been suggested.
Carae	10	unknown	Several locations have been suggested. By homophony it could be Cariñena.
Sermone	20	unknown	Several locations have been suggested.
Caesaraugusta	30	Zaragoza	Always known.

== See also ==
- Laminio
- Caesaraugusta
- Libisosa

== Bibliography ==
- Arias, Gonzalo (2004). Repertorio de Caminos de la Hispania Romana (in Spanish) (2nd ed.). Ronda: Pórtico librerías.
- PALOMERO PLAZA, S. (1987). Las vías romanas en la provincia de Cuenca (in Spanish). Cuenca: Diputación de Cuenca.
- Plaza, Simón (2011). "De El Bonillo a Murcia y 'De Norte a Sur: llamado camino de la Calzada'. Una solución al Itinerario Antonino 31". El Nuevo Miliario. 12: 27–53. Archived from the original on 2016-02-02.
- Roldán Hervás, José Manuel (1973). Itineraria Hispana. Fuentes antiguas para el estudio de las vías romanas en la península ibérica (in Spanish). Valladolid: Universidad de Valladolid.
- Saavedra, Eduardo (1862). Discursos leídos ante la Real Academia de la Historia en la recepción pública de D. Eduardo Saavedra (in Spanish). Madrid: Real Academia de la Historia.
