= Saint Thomas of Villanova Healing a Lame Man =

Painting by Bartolomé Esteban Murillo

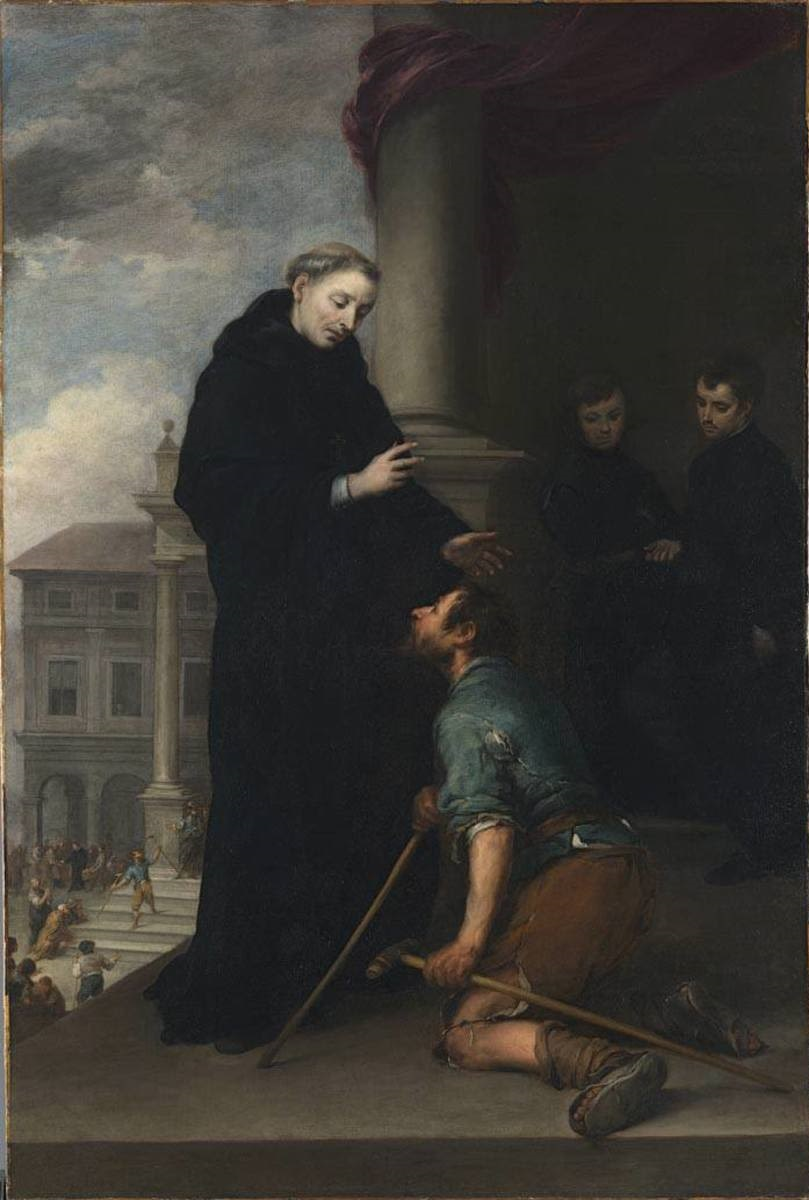
Saint Thomas of Villanova Healing a Lame Man (c. 1675) by Bartolomé Esteban Murillo

Saint Thomas of Villanova Healing a Lame Man is an oil on canvas painting by Bartolomé Esteban Murillo, created c. 1675. It is held in the Alte Pinakothek in Munich, having been bought for Maximilian I Joseph of Bavaria by General Sebastiani in Paris in 1815. It depicts a miracle performed by the Spanish saint Thomas of Villanova.
