= Antonine Itinerary =

Imperial Roman register of roads and stations

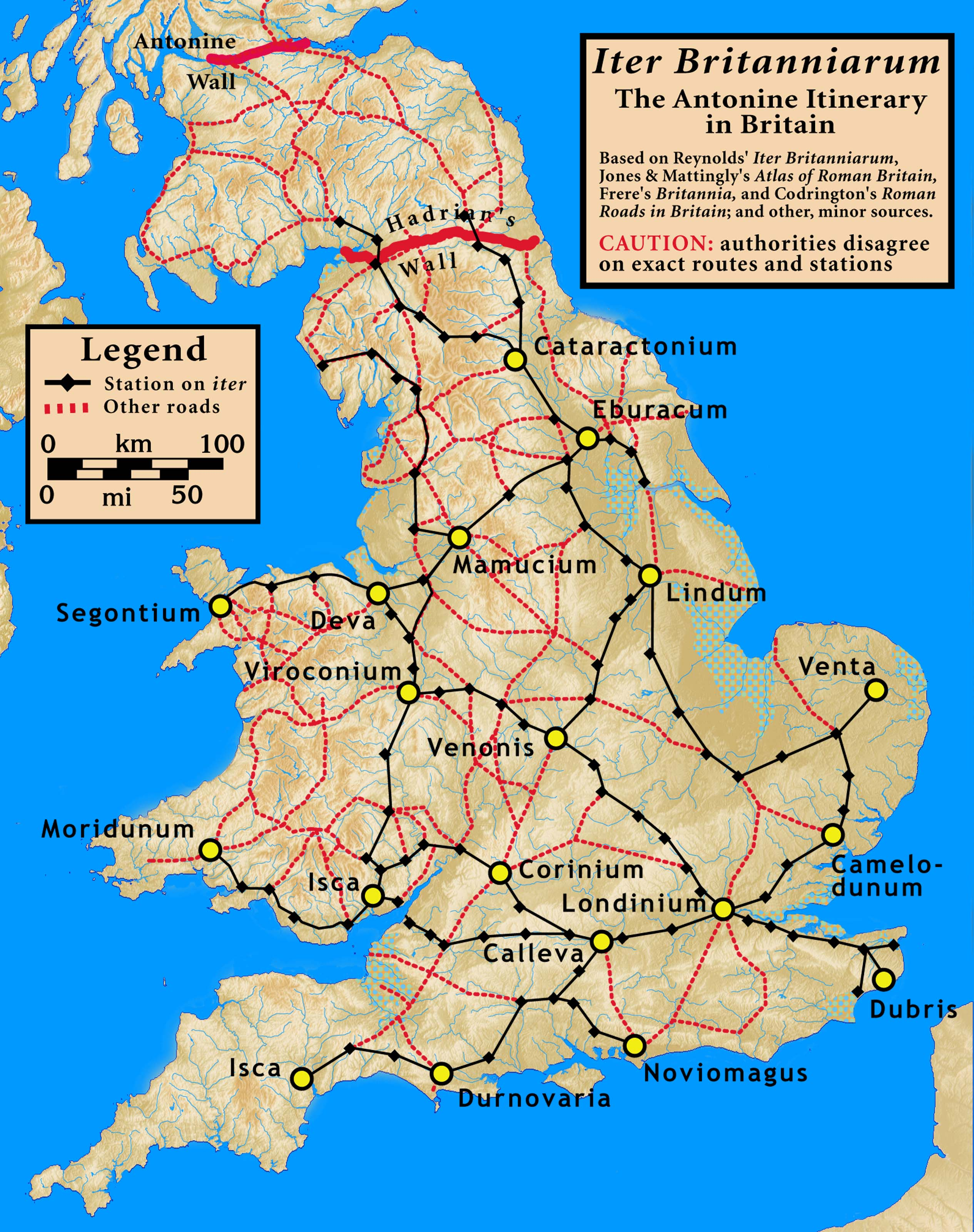
Iter Britanniarum, displayed as a road map. The plotted routes and stations are approximations. The Antonine Wall and Hadrian's Wall are shown.

The Antonine Itinerary (Latin: Itinerarium Antonini Augusti, "Itinerary of the Emperor Antoninus") is an itinerarium, a register of the stations and distances along various roads. Seemingly based on official documents, possibly in part from a survey carried out under Augustus, it describes the roads of the Roman Empire. Owing to the scarcity of other extant records of this type, it is a valuable historical record.

== Transmission ==
=== Manuscripts ===
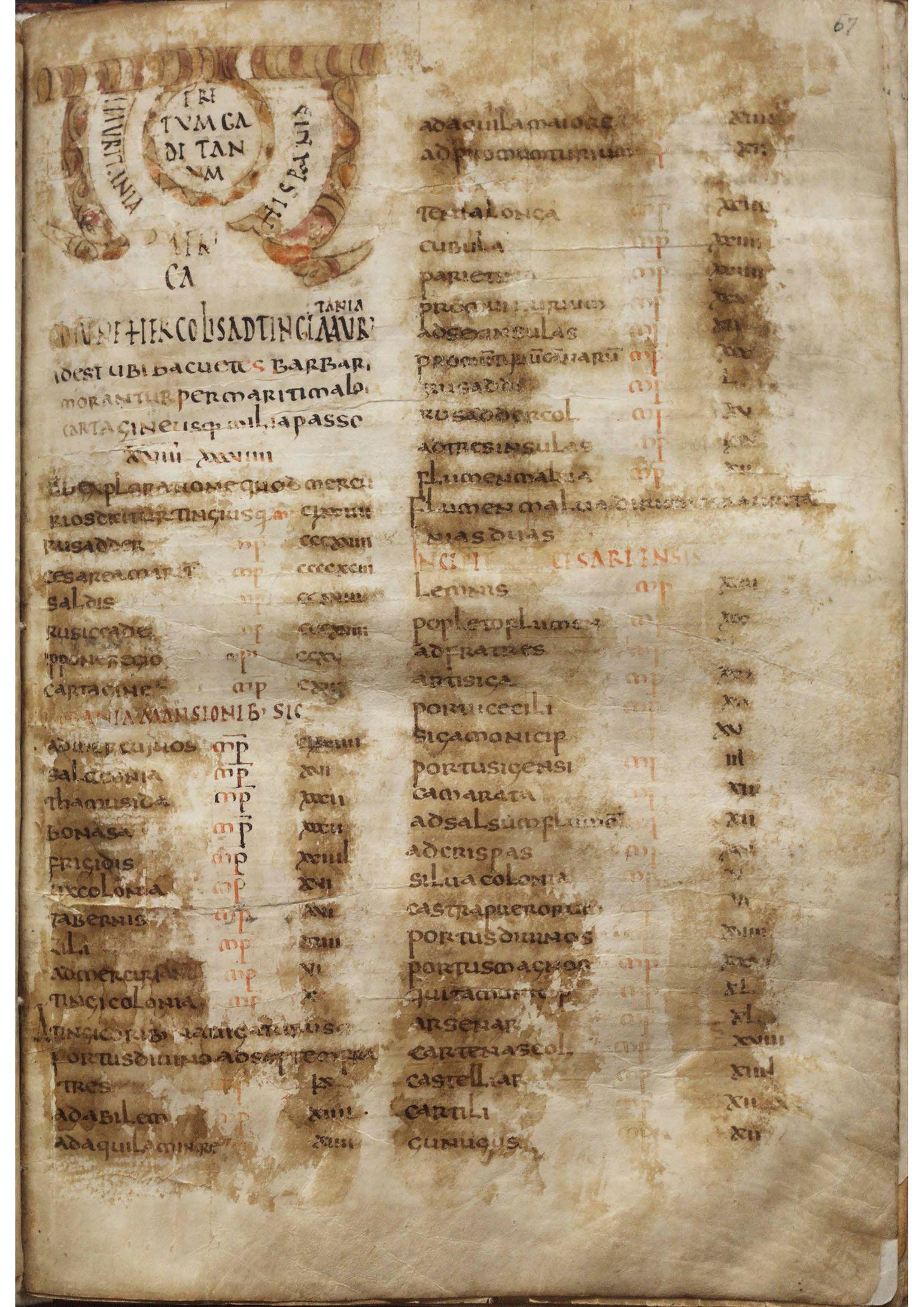
RBME R II 18 f.67r The first page of the oldest manuscript preserving the Itinerarium.

Almost nothing is known of its author or the conditions of the Itinerary's compilation. Numerous manuscripts survive, the eight oldest dating to some point between the 7th to 10th centuries AD, after the onset of the Carolingian Renaissance. Despite the title seeming to ascribe the work to the patronage of the 2nd-century Antoninus Pius, all surviving editions seem to trace to an original towards the end of the reign of Diocletian in the early 4th century. The most likely imperial patron—if the work had one—would have been Caracalla.

It appears to have been relatively well known between the 8th and 10th centuries, but to have fallen into a state of relative neglect from the 11th to 14th centuries, before being rediscovered in the 15th century by humanist scholars including Pietro Donato, Flavio Biondo and Ermolao Barbaro.

Manuscripts of the Antonine Itinerary
Siglum	Library	Shelfmark	Date (Century)	Folios	Notes	Source
P	Escorialensis	RBME R II 18	7th-9th	67r-82v	Finishes half way through Gaul on f.82v.	
D	BnF	Latin 7230A	10th	87r-97v		
L	Vindobonensis	Cod. 181	8th	26r-60v	Earliest to contain the Iter Britanniarum. The manuscript was corrected/updated by at least three hands, occurring at different places in the stemma codicum.	
B	BnF	Latin 4807	9th	18-64	British section 58-60.	
β	Vindobonensis	Cod. 12825	15th	25v-76v		
R	Florentinus Laurentianus	Plut.89 sup.67	10th			
C	BnF	Latin 4808	12th			

=== Stemma ===
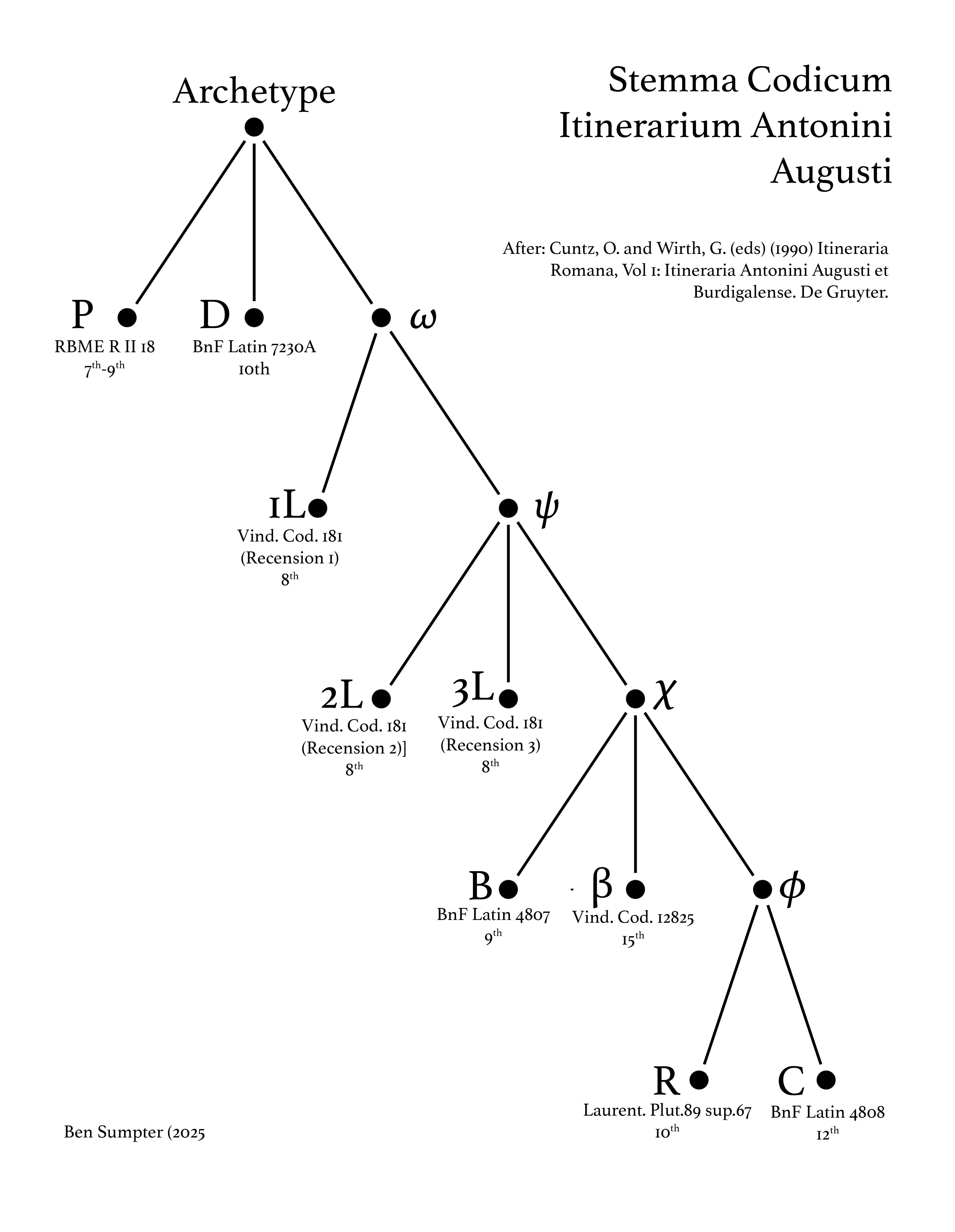
Stemma codicum of the Antonine Itinerary.

There are many manuscripts preserving the textual tradition of the Antonine Itinerary. For their edition of 1848 Parthey and Pinder used 21 and listed a further 17 derivatives, however Cuntz (1929) focused his work on the critical edition to just 7 manuscripts: P, D, L, B, β, R and C. He considered manuscripts P and D to be the most reliable and upon which was based the text of the critical edition. Manuscript L was revised on at least 3 occasions by 3 different hands with each placing differently in the stemma; this was used as the basis for the critical text for sections missing from P and D. Despite being 600 years apart, B and β are considered sister manuscripts. R and C are sisters from the most recent recension used by Cuntz.

Of Cuntz' critical edition, only manuscripts L, B, β, R and C preserve the Iter Britanniarum.

== Iter Britanniarum ==
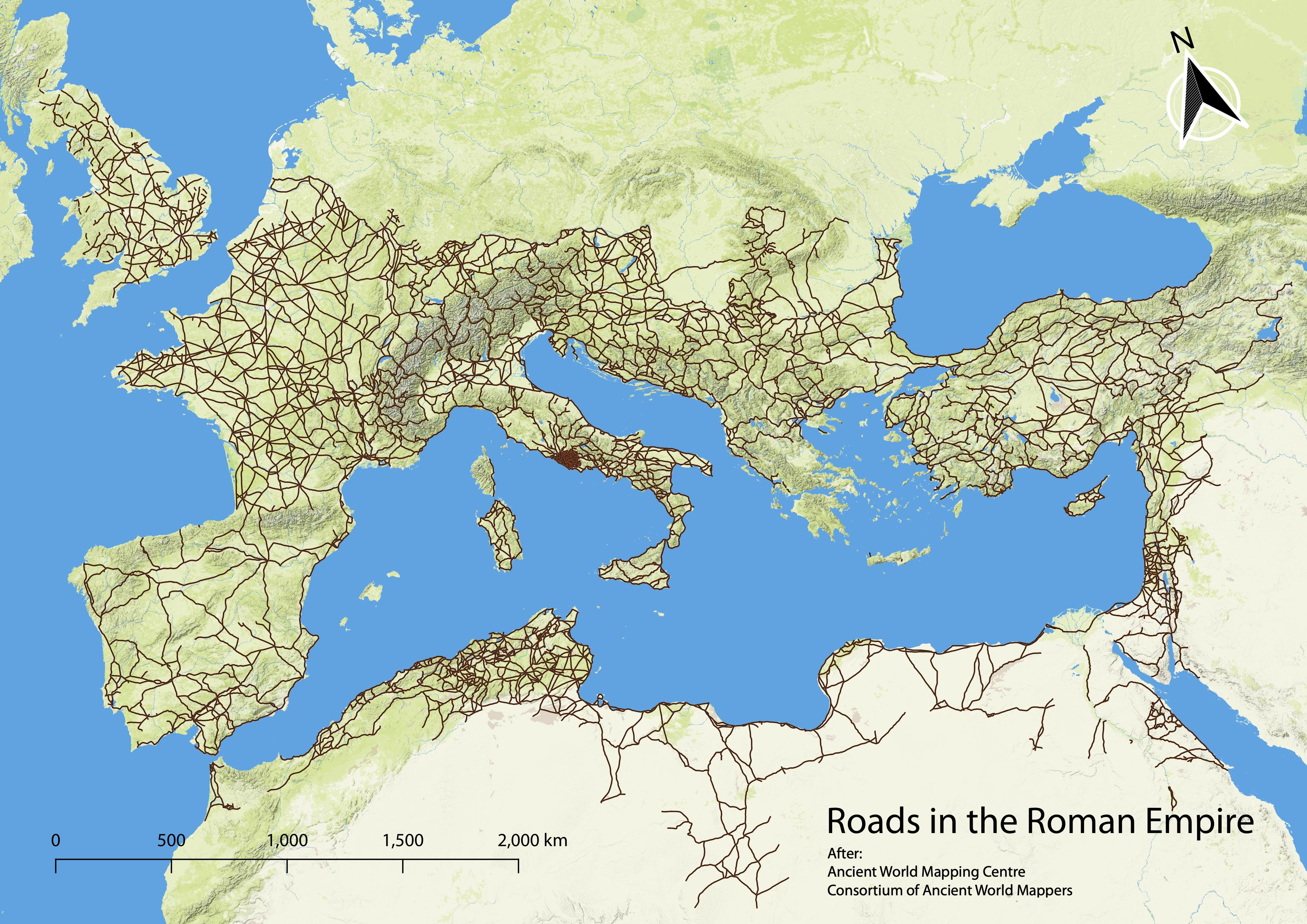
Combined data from the Peutinger Table and Antonine Itinerary recording the Roman roads network.

The British section is known as the Iter Britanniarum, and can be described as the 'road map' of Roman Britain. There are 15 such itineraries in the document applying to different geographic areas.

The itinerary measures distances in Roman miles, where 1,000 Roman paces equals one Roman mile. A Roman pace was two steps, left plus right, and was conventionally set at 5 Roman feet (0.296 m), resulting in a Roman mile of 1,479 metres (0.919 miles).

=== Examples ===
Below are the original Latin ablative forms for sites along route 13, followed by a translation with a possible (but not necessarily authoritative) name for the modern sites. A transcriber omitted an entry, so that the total number of paces did not equal the sum of paces between locations.

Iter XIII (Itinerary 13)
Latin ablative	Translated possible site name	Distance		
Latin ablative	Translated possible site name	Roman miles	Metric (km)	English miles
Item ab Isca Calleva mpm cviiii sic	A route from Isca Silurum to Calleva Atrebatum thus	109	161	100
Burrio mpm viii	Usk, Monmouthshire	8	12	7.5
Blestio mpm xi	Monmouth, Monmouthshire	11	16	10
Ariconio mpm xi	Bury Hill, Weston under Penyard, Herefordshire	11	16	10
Clevo mpm xv	Gloucester, Gloucestershire	15	22	14
(no entry - mpm xx)	perhaps Corinium Dobunnorum at modern Cirencester, Gloucestershire	(20)	(30)	(18.5)
Durocornovio mpm xiiii	perhaps Wanborough, Wiltshire	14	21	13
Spinis mpm xv	Speen, Berkshire	15	22	14
Calleva mpm xv	Silchester, Hampshire	15	22	14

Below are the original Latin names for sites along route 14, followed by a translation with a possible (but not necessarily authoritative) name for the modern sites.

Iter XIV (Itinerary 14)
Latin ablative	Translated possible site name	Distance		
Latin ablative	Translated possible site name	Roman miles	Metric (km)	English miles
Item alio itinere ab Isca Calleva mpm ciii sic	An alternate route from Isca Silurum to Calleva Atrebatum thus	103	152	95
Venta Silurum mpm viiii	Caerwent, Monmouthshire	9	13	8
Abone mpm xiiii	Sea Mills, Gloucestershire	14	21	13
Traiectus mpm viiii	perhaps Bitton, near Willsbridge, Gloucestershire	9	13	8
Aquis Solis mpm vi	Bath, Somerset	6	9	5.5
Verlucione mpm xv	Sandy Lane, Wiltshire	15	22	14
Cunetione mpm xx	Mildenhall, Wiltshire	20	30	18.5
Spinis mpm xv	Speen, Berkshire	15	22	14
Calleva mpm xv	Silchester, Hampshire	15	22	14

=== A confounding factor ===
De Situ Britanniae (made available c. 1749, published 1757) was a forgery by Charles Bertram that provided much spurious information on Roman Britain, including "itineraries" that overlapped the legitimate Antonine Itineraries, sometimes with contradicting information. Its authenticity was not seriously challenged until 1845, and it was still cited as an authoritative source until the late nineteenth century. By then, its false data had infected almost every account of ancient British history, and had been adopted into the Ordnance Survey maps, as General Roy and his successors believed it to be a legitimate source of information, on a par with the Antonine Itineraries. While the document is no longer cited since its authenticity became indefensible, its data has not been systematically removed from past and present works.

Some authors, such as Thomas Reynolds, without challenging the authenticity of the forgery, took care to note its discrepancies and challenge the quality of its information. This was not always so, even after the forgery was debunked.

Gonzalo Arias (died 2008) proposed that some of the distance anomalies in the British section of the Antonine Itinerary resulted from the loss of Latin grammatical endings, as these had marked junctions heading towards places, as distinct from the places themselves. However, Arias may not have taken account of earlier work indicating that distances were measured between the edges of administrative areas of named settlements as opposed to centre-to-centre, thereby explaining supposed distance shortfalls and providing additional useful data on the approximate sizes of such areas.

== Hispania ==
Main Roman roads in Hispania

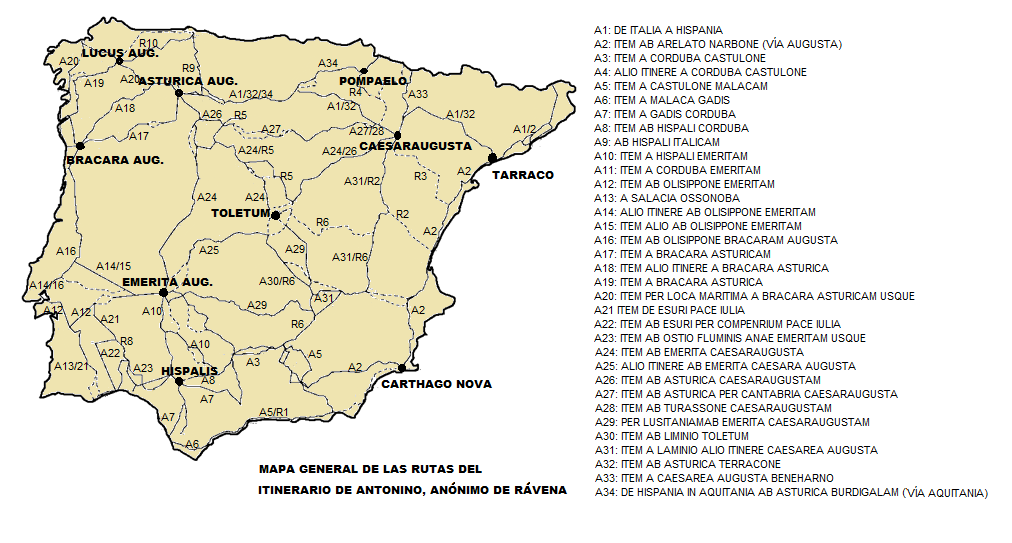
Roads listed on the Itinerary

There are 34 routes in the itinerary for the provinces of Hispania.

Route	Start	End	Distance (Roman miles)
1	Mediolanum (Milan)	Legio VII Gemina (León)	1257
2	Arelate (Arles)	Castulo	898
3	Corduba (Córdoba)	Castulo	99
4	Corduba	Castulo	78
5	Castulo	Malaca (Málaga)	291
6	Malaca	Gades (Cádiz)	145
7	Gades	Corduba	294
8	Hispalis (Seville)	Corduba	94
9	Hispalis	Italica	6
10	Hispalis	Emerita (Mérida)	162
11	Corduba	Emerita	144
12	Olisipo (Lisbon)	Emerita	161
13	Salacia (Alcácer)	Ossonoba (Faro)	16
14	Olisipo	Emerita	145
15	Olisipo	Emerita	220
16	Olisipo	Bracara (Braga)	244
17	Bracara	Asturica (Astorga)	247
18	Bracara	Asturica	215
19	Bracara	Asturica	299
20	Bracara	Asturica	207
21	Esuris (Castro Marim)	Pax Julia	267
22	Esuris	Pax Julia	76
23	Mouth of the Ana (Guadiana)	Emerita	313
24	Emerita	Caesaraugusta (Zaragoza)	632
25	Emerita	Caesaraugusta	348
26	Asturica	Caesaraugusta	497
27	Asturica	Caesaraugusta	301
28	Turiaso (Tarazona)	Caesaraugusta	56
29	Emerita	Caesaraugusta	458
30	Laminium (Fuenllana)	Toletum (Toledo)	95
31	Laminium	Toletum	249
32	Asturica	Tarraco (Tarragona)	482
33	Caesaraugusta	Benearnum (Lescar)	112
34	Asturica	Burdigala (Bordeaux)	421

== See also ==
- Roman units
- Laminium
- Via XXXI
- Caesaraugusta
- Peutinger Table
- Ptolemy's Geography
- Ravenna Cosmography
