= Thomas of Villanova =

Preacher, ascetic and religious writer

Saint Thomas of Villanova OSA
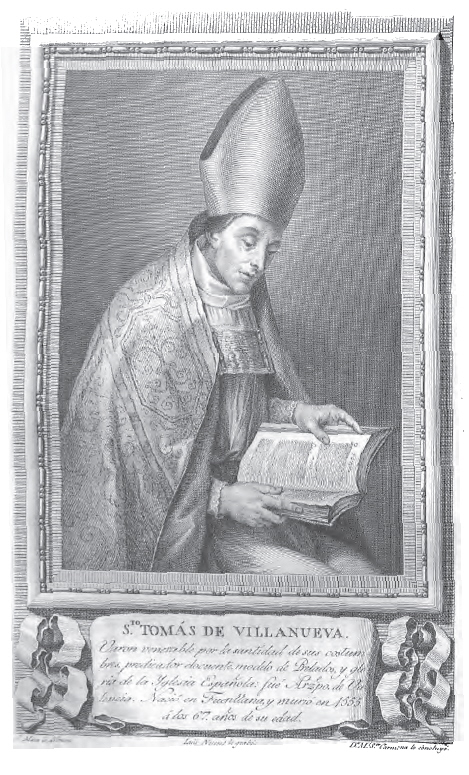
- Old master print of St. Thomas in Portraits of Illustrious Spaniards (Madrid, 1791)

Religious, bishop and confessor
- Born: Tomás García y Martínez; 1488 in Fuenllana, Ciudad Real, Spain
- Died: 8 September 1555 in Valencia, Spain
- Venerated in: Catholic Church
- Beatified: 07 October 1618 by Pope Paul V
- Canonized: 01 November 1658 by Pope Alexander VII
- Feast: 10 October, or 22 September
- Attributes: A bishop distributing alms to the poor
- Patronage: Danao City, Cebu and Pardo District, Cebu City; Santolan, Pasig; Alimodian and Miag-ao in Iloilo; Dao, Capiz; Villanova University

Thomas of Villanova, OSA (born Tomás García y Martínez; 1488 – 08 September 1555) was a Spanish Augustinian friar, preacher, ascetic and religious writer. He served as Archbishop of Valencia from 1545 to 1555 and was famous for the extent of his care for the poor of his see.

== Life ==
He was born Tomás García y Martínez in Fuenllana, Spain, in 1488. His father was a miller, who regularly distributed food and provisions to the poor, as did his mother. He grew up and was educated in Villanueva de los Infantes, in the Province of Ciudad Real, Spain, therefore the name Thomas of Villanueva. Part of the original house still stands, with a coat of arms in the corner, beside a family chapel. In spite of his family's wealth, as a young boy he often went about naked because he had given his clothing to the poor.

At the age of sixteen years, Thomas entered the University of Alcalá de Henares to study Arts and Theology. He became a professor there, teaching arts, logic, and philosophy, despite a continuing absentmindedness and poor memory. In 1516, he decided to join the Augustinian friars in Salamanca and in 1518 was ordained a priest.

He became renowned for his eloquent and effective preaching in the churches of Salamanca. Thomas composed beautiful sermons, among which stands out the Sermon on the Love of God, one of the great examples of sacred oratory of the 16th century. Charles V, upon hearing him preach, exclaimed, "This monsignor can move even the stones!". Charles named Thomas one of his councilors of state and court preacher in Valladolid, the residence of the Emperor when on his visits to the Low Countries.

His scathing attacks on his fellow bishops earned him the title of reformer. Some of his sermons attacked the cruelty of bullfighting. He also had a great devotion to the Virgin Mary, whose heart he compared to the burning bush of Moses that is never consumed.

Within the Order, he successively held the positions of prior of his local monastery, Visitor General, and Prior Provincial for Andalusia and Castile. In 1533, Thomas sent out the first Augustinian friars to arrive in Mexico. Charles V offered him the post of Archbishop of Granada but he would not accept it.

=== Bishop ===
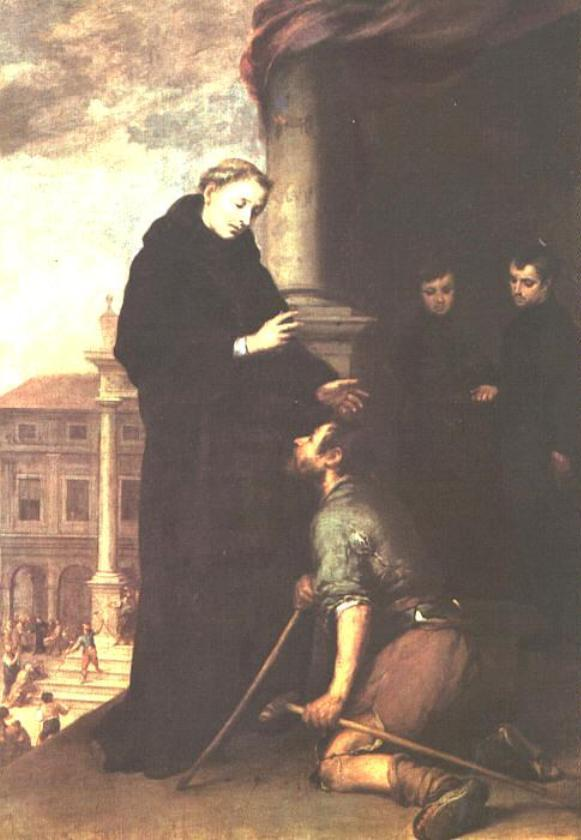
Thomas of Villanova Heals The Sick, Murillo

In 1544 he was nominated as Archbishop of Valencia and he continued to refuse the position until ordered to accept by his superior. Given a donation to decorate his residence, he sent the money to a hospital in need of repair. He began his episcopacy by visiting every parish in the Archdiocese to discover what the needs of the people were. Aided by his assistant bishop, Juan Segriá, he put in order an archdiocese that for a century had not had direct pastoral government. He organized a special college for Moorish converts, and in particular an effective plan for social assistance, welfare, and charity. In 1547 he ordained as a priest Luis Beltrán, a noted missionary in South America. Thomas started Presentation Seminary in 1550.

He was well known for his great personal austerity (he sold the straw mattress on which he slept in order to give money to the poor) and wore the same habit that he had received in the novitiate, mending it himself. Thomas was known as “father of the poor.” His continual charitable efforts were untiring, especially towards orphans, poor women without a dowry, and the sick. He possessed, however, an intelligent notion of charity, so that while he was very charitable, he sought to obtain definitive and structural solutions to the problem of poverty; for example, giving work to the poor, thereby making his charity bear fruit. "Charity is not just giving, rather removing the need of those who receive charity and liberating them from it when possible," he wrote. He established boarding schools and high schools.

Thomas died in Valencia on September 8, 1555, of angina at the age of 67. His remains are preserved at the Cathedral there.

== Veneration ==
He was canonized by Pope Alexander VII on 01 November 1658. His feast day is celebrated on 10 October in Valencia (and Spain), and by the Augustinians, while some places in the Philippines commemorate him on 22 September.

== Legacy ==
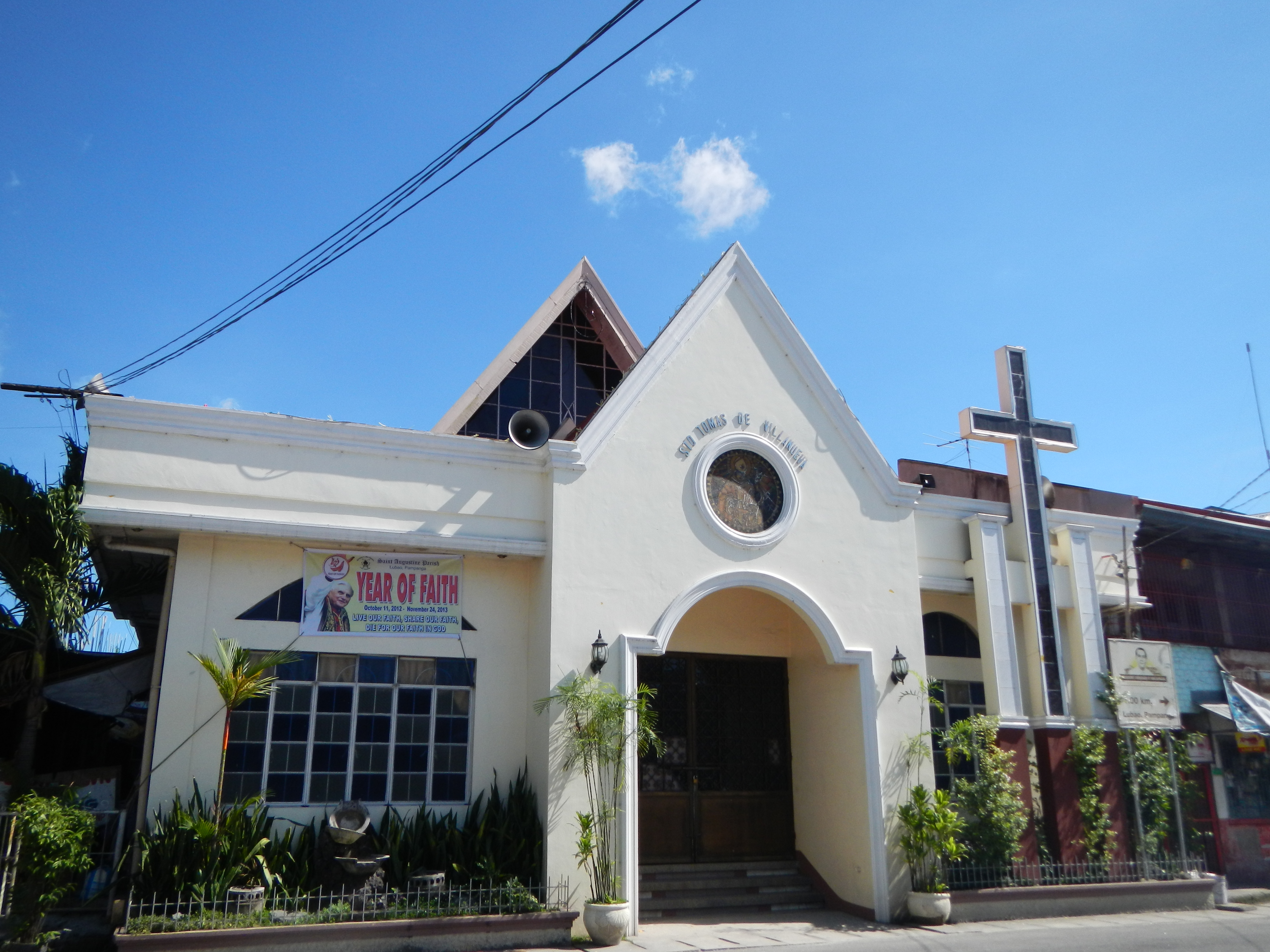
Barangay Santo Tomas Lubao, Pampanga (a Kapilya or Chapel) in Lubao Pampanga, Philippines, dedicated to Saint Thomas of Villanova.

Thomas is the author of various Tracts, among which is included the Soliloquy between God and the soul, on the topic of communion. His complete writings were published in six volumes as Opera omnia, in Manila in 1881.

Francisco de Quevedo wrote his biography.

Thomas is the namesake and patron saint of Villanova University, near Philadelphia in the United States, which was founded and is administered by the friars of his Order.

Universidad Católica de Santo Tomás de Villanueva in Havana, Cuba; St. Thomas University in Miami Gardens, Florida, US; and Villanova College, a Catholic school for boys located in Brisbane, Australia were also named after him.

In the Philippines, some churches and towns are dedicated in honor of the saint with grand celebrations on his feast day, preceded by nine-day novena Masses. He is the patron saint of the towns of Alimodian and Miag-ao in Iloilo, Santolan and Sto. Tomas in Pasig, and Pitpitan in Bulakan, Bulacan. He is the Patron of the historic District of Pardo, Cebu City and the City of Danao in the Province of Cebu. Danao, arguably, has the grandest celebration of his feast in the Philippines. The city marks the start of his feast with the Libod sa Kawo, a dawn procession of the Mitre of St. Thomas that marks the start of his novenary and the festivities of St. Thomas' feast in the town. The event culminates with a triduum starting on the 9th day of novenas and lasting up until the day of vespers and the feast day of St. Thomas in September, during which, he is honored through a procession and the grand Karansa Festival.

St. Thomas of Villanova Church in Manuels, Conception Bay South, Newfoundland, is named after him.

A congregation of sisters is also named after him.

His feast day is 18 September.

== See also ==
- Santo Tomás de Villanueva Parish (Miagao Church) in Iloilo, Philippines

Catholic Church titles
Preceded by Jorge de Austria	Archbishop of Valencia; 1544–1555	Succeeded by Francisco de Navarra
