= Villar de Domingo García =

Villar de Domingo García, Spain
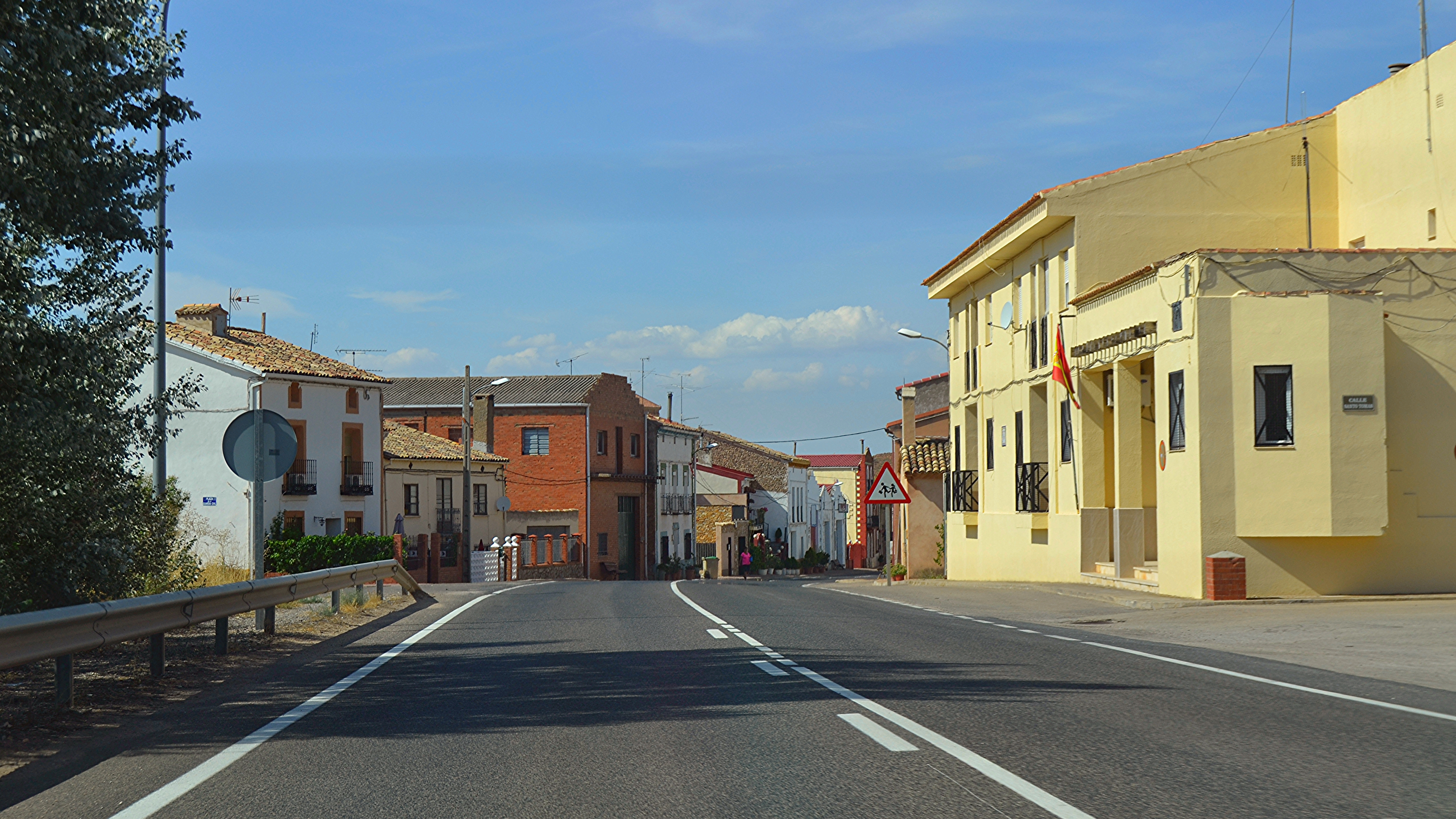

- Flag Coat of arms

- Location within Spain Location within Castilla-La Mancha
- Coordinates: 40°14′N 2°17′W
- Country: Spain
- Autonomous community: Castile-La Mancha
- Province: Cuenca
- Municipality: Villar de Domingo García

Area
  - Total: 54.77 km^{2} (21.15 sq mi)
- Elevation: 933 m (3,061 ft)

Population (2025-01-01)
  - Total: 217
  - Density: 3.96/km^{2} (10.3/sq mi)
- Time zone: UTC+1 (CET)
  - Summer (DST): UTC+2 (CEST)

Villar de Domingo García is a municipality located in the province of Cuenca, Castile-La Mancha, Spain.

According to the 2004 census (INE), the municipality had a population of 271 inhabitants.

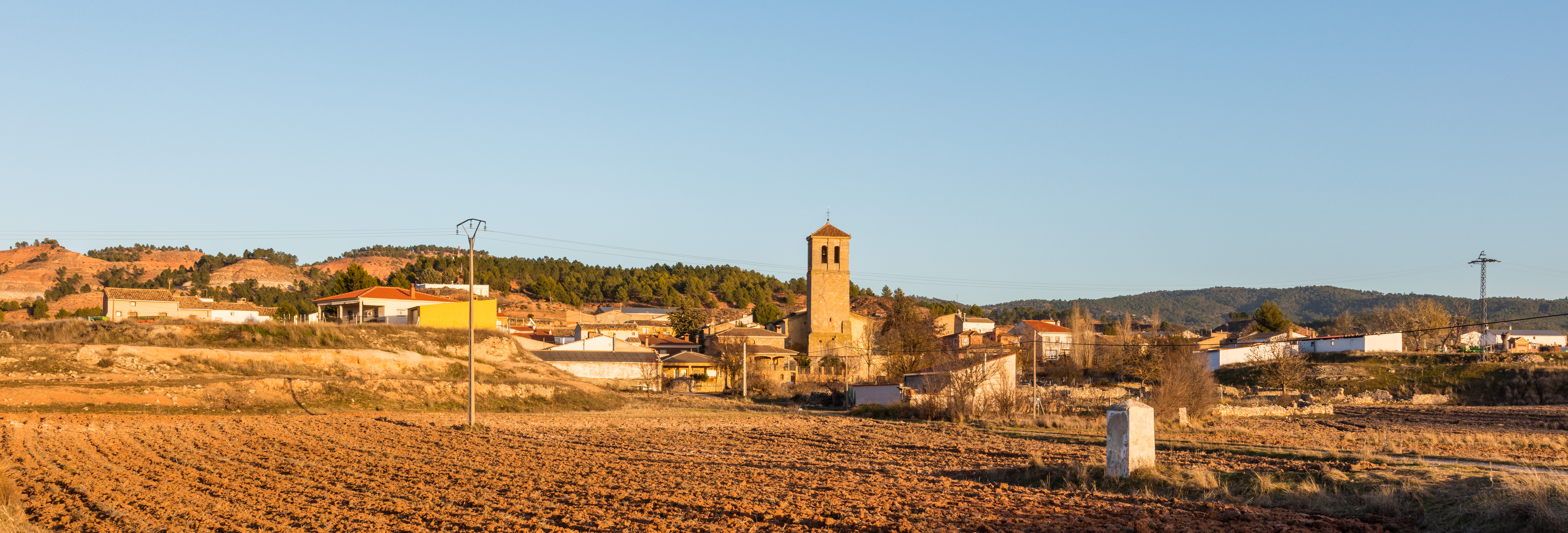
View of Villar de Domingo García

== Roman villa ==
In the municipality are the remains of an important Roman villa known in Spanish as the Villa romana de Noheda. It dates to the Late Antiquity and is notable for its mosaics. In June 2019 it was hoped to open the site to the public in the near future.
