= Valdetórtola =

Valdetórtola, Spain
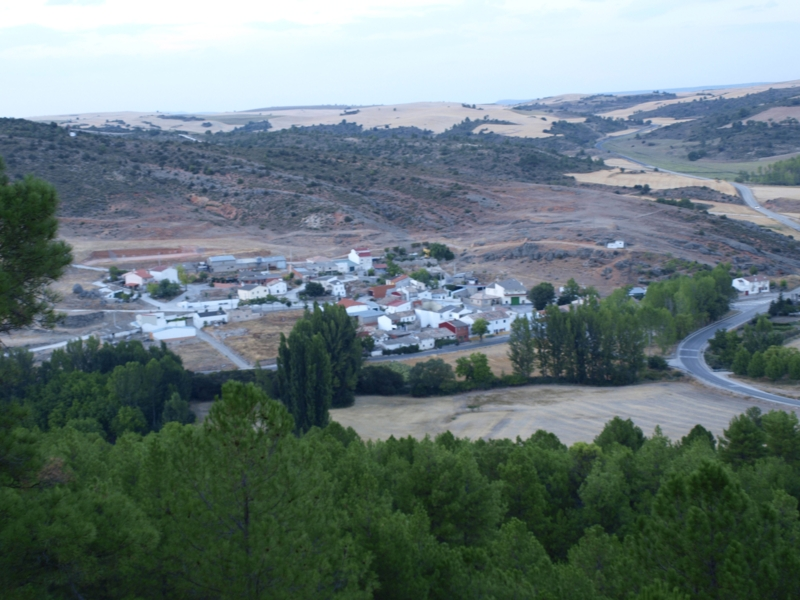

- Flag Coat of arms

- Location within Spain Location within Castilla-La Mancha
- Coordinates: 39.9203°N 2.18611°W
- Country: Spain
- Autonomous community: Castile-La Mancha
- Province: Cuenca
- Municipality: Valdetórtola

Area
  - Total: 103 km^{2} (40 sq mi)

Population (2025-01-01)
  - Total: 115
  - Density: 1.12/km^{2} (2.89/sq mi)
- Time zone: UTC+1 (CET)
  - Summer (DST): UTC+2 (CEST)

Valdetórtola is a municipality located in the province of Cuenca, Castile-La Mancha, Spain. According to the 2004 census (INE), the municipality has a population of 146 inhabitants. WebÇ: http://www.tortolaweb.com
