= Alhambra, Ciudad Real =

Alhambra
- Municipality
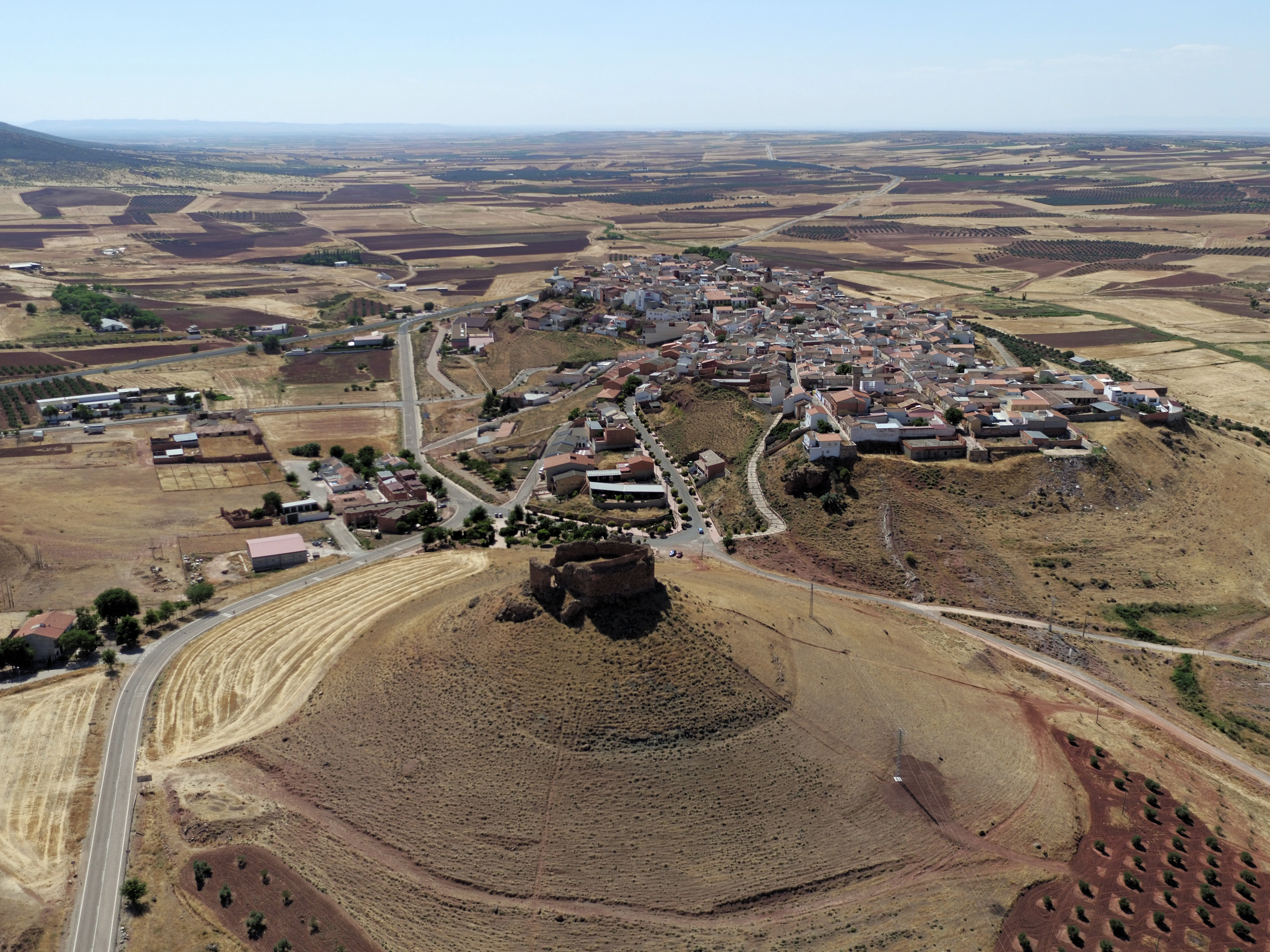
- Aerial view of Alhambra

- Coat of arms

- Location within Spain
- Coordinates: 38°53′58.5″N 3°03′12.2″W
- Country: Spain
- A. Community: Castilla-La Mancha
- Province: Ciudad Real

Government
  - Mayor: Luis Santos

Area
  - Total: 580.2 km^{2} (224.0 sq mi)

Population (January 1, 2021)
  - Total: 988
  - Density: 1.703/km^{2} (4.41/sq mi)
- Time zone: UTC+01:00 (CET)
- Postal code: 13248
- Area code: 13010
- Website: Official website

Alhambra is a municipality in Ciudad Real, Castile-La Mancha, Spain. It has a population of 1,213. Sierra de Alhambra is a mountain range close to the town.
