= Fuenllana =

Municipality in Ciudad Real, Spain

Coordinates: 38°45′N 2°57′W

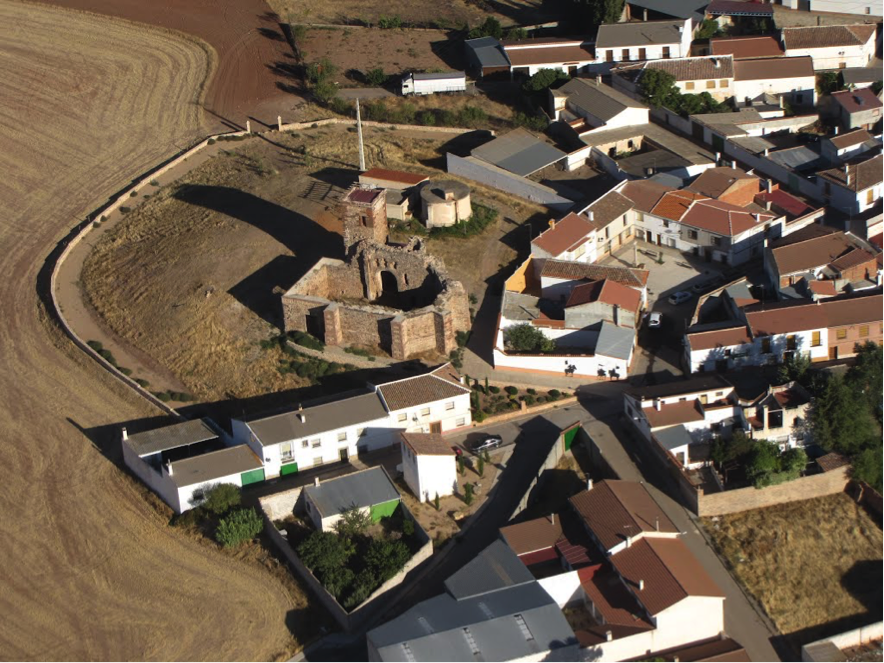
Aerial view of the Castle-Church of Santa Catalina in Fuenllana and surrounding area

Flag of Fuenllana

Coat of arms of Fuenllana

Fuenllana is a municipality in Ciudad Real, Castile-La Mancha, Spain. It has a population of 320.

Fuenllana was called Laminium during Roman times, incorporated into Roman territory after the subjugation of the Carpetani.
