= Libisosa =

Iberian oppidum located in Lezuza, Albacete

- Former subdivision of Iberian Peninsula
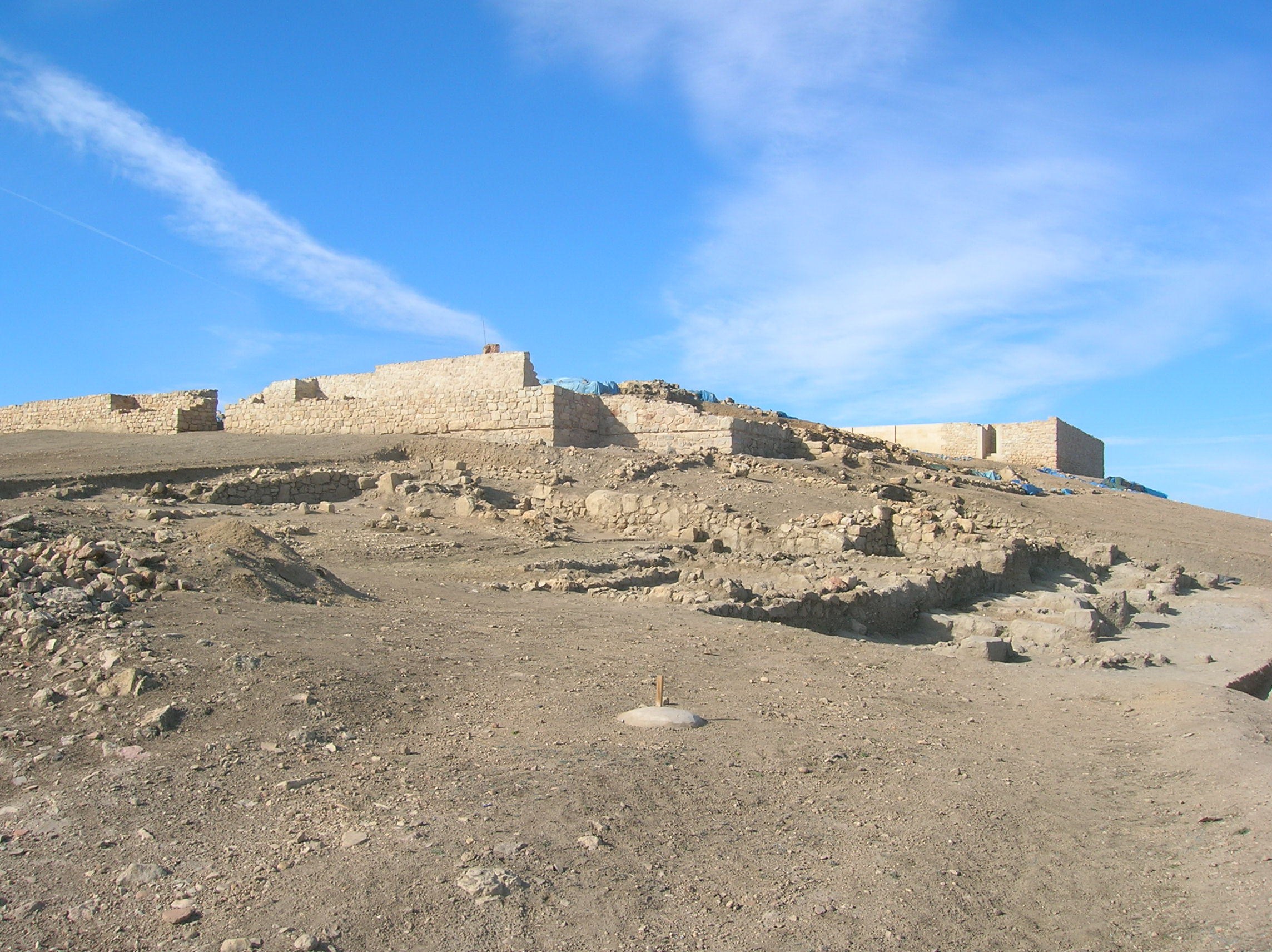
- Ibero-Roman city of Lihisosa
- Demonym: Oretanos, libisosanos
- Area
  - Coordinates: 38°56′31″N 2°21′14″W
- Government
  - Type: Iberian Oppidum - Roman colony - Medieval enclave
- Today part of: Lezuza, Albacete, Spain

The archaeological site of Libisosa is located in the "Cerro del Castillo" in the municipality of Lezuza (Albacete, Castilla-La Mancha). As a result of archaeological excavations (begun in 1996 by a team from the University of Alicante led by José Uroz Sáez, and continued uninterruptedly since then), it is now known that the site covers 30 hectares of remains ranging from the Late Bronze Age to the Late Middle Ages, the latter presided over by the watchtower that bears the name of the hill, and to which also corresponds a building of the military orders. From the Roman period, the late Republican wall and the forum of the Roman colony mentioned by Pliny the Elder (NH, III, 25) stand out, while the final phase of the Iberian oppidum assigned to the regio oretana by Ptolemy (II, 6, 58) stands out. The excellent preservation of structures and materials of the Ibero-Roman stage of Libisosa is due to the "burial effect" caused by its hasty and systematic destruction, which has allowed a frozen image of its state prior to the devastation to reach the present day, which constitutes a mine for research on the Final Iberian and Republican Hispania, most of which has yet to be discovered.

In 2021, steps were taken to declare the site an archaeological park. It is the second park in the province of Albacete, and the sixth in the entire Castilian-La Mancha region.

== The Oretano oppidum ==
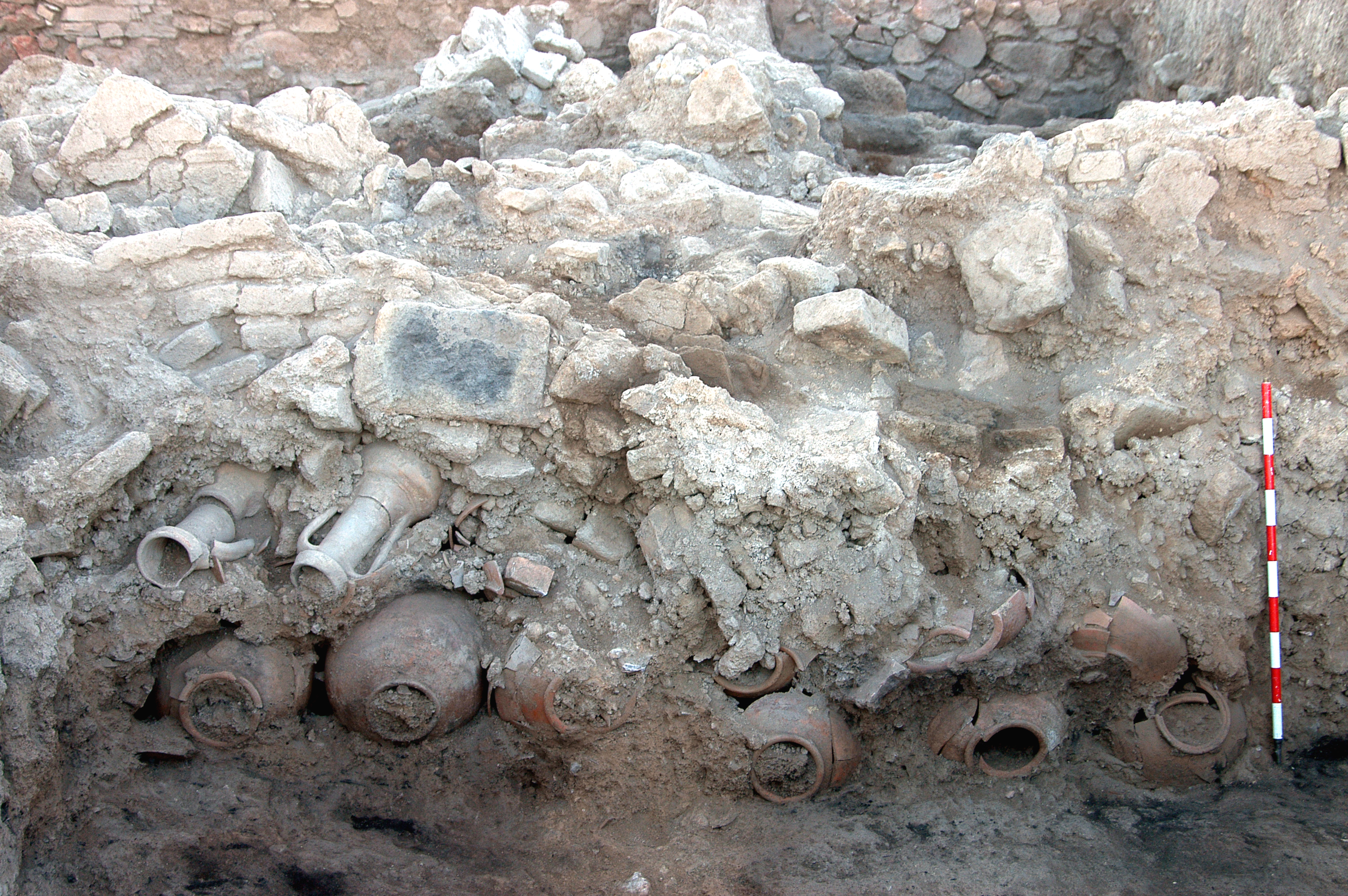
Iberian and Roman amphorae under the collapsed walls of an Iberian building in Libisosa.

The first archaeological evidence of occupation of the hill dates back to the Final Bronze Age, by virtue of the discovery of prehistoric handmade pottery scattered throughout the site, with only a special concentration in Sector 2, where there also seem to be traces of habitat, and where can be found gray pottery vessels, placing this context in an arc from the IX/VIII to VI century BC, at the time of transition between the Final Bronze Age and the I Iron /Orientalizing period. The continuity of the habitat in the ancient Iberian period is logical, and there are several factors that suggest that this oppidum played a key role in the region.

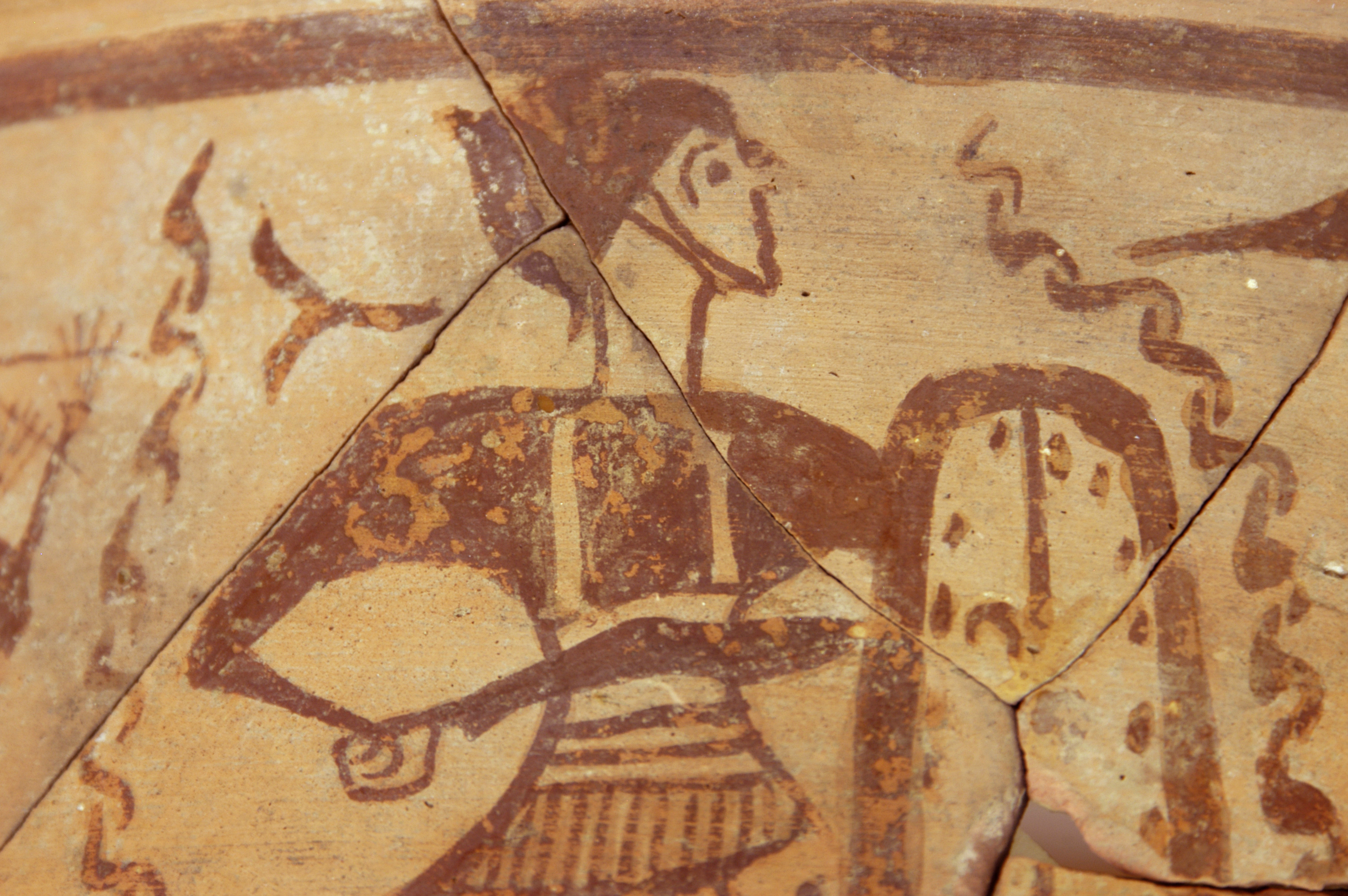
Iberian warrior painted on a jar found in Libisosa.

But if there is a stage of Libisosa mentioned by Ptolemy (II, 6, 58) among the Iberian cities of Oretania, worthy of note due to the archaeological findings, it is the one that corresponds to the final phase, which covers the 2nd century to the first third of the 1st century B.C., and which provides information on various aspects of the life of an Oretan community under the rule of Rome, probably of stipendiary peregrinus, in a stage of its Romanization process that could be described as early, probably favored, among other reasons, by the presence of Italic traders and, above all, by an army corps (or soldiers housed in hospice regime) that would provide security to the routes that converge there. The process of Romanization will run parallel, paradoxically, to another of self-affirmation, finding in iconography an ideal canvas (as also shown by some unique vases found in Libisosa) to extol Iberian aristocratic virtue, within the framework of the construction of its own mythology, for its internal cohesion (of the ruling group and its clientele) and in short, to maintain its privileges in the face of the new Roman order.

And if this phase is important it is due to its exceptional state of preservation, motivated by a sudden destruction, which has been related to the Sertorian wars (82-72 BC), and which offers an unaltered image of the moment immediately prior to that devastation, both in terms of structures and materials. The discovery of an infant skeleton lying on one of the streets is a testimony to the cruelty of this episode and the rupture it entailed.

Two sectors stand out from what is known as the Ibero-Roman quarter:

- Sector 3, located on the northern slope. Part of a neighborhood has been excavated, whose complete perimeter is yet to be defined, having discovered a set of about twenty apartments, multifunctional spaces headquarters of the Iberian elite of the place and its clientele, who are those residing in the oppidum. The high number of imported materials (amphorae, black varnish and thin-walled crockery, bronze ware) found in this area and the rest of the Ibero-Roman neighborhood is in absolute terms, but not in relative terms: the vast majority of the record recovered is Iberian, as are its constructions and, surely, its internal organization. The construction technique documented in these buildings is characterized by the use of rammed earth and, above all, adobe, which was the main element of the walls, resting on stone plinths, as well as the basic element of the "burial effect" that preserved, with its collapse, the contents of the buildings.
- Sector 18, to the northwest of the previous one, dominated by a large building with a trapezoidal floor plan and 181 m^{2}, apartment 127, which had an upper floor at least in part of its surface, and a shed roof with a porch-like opening on the W side, and which must have belonged to a local oligarch. The construction, musealized in situ to be visited, has 6 rooms, which show a clear plurifunctionality (like so many Iberian constructions). Its diversification and relevance make it an oligarchic complex that transcends the concept of workshop, but also the domestic one. In addition to a unique set of imported materials, imitations and prestige goods, and an overwhelming majority of Iberian material, as is normal in this phase, the agricultural sphere is also represented, as evidenced by the concentration of agricultural tools, along with the presence of other elements related to the cavalry and livestock, and even metallurgical activities. But the building, above all, shows a clear exercise of the various production processes in the broadest sense, which mainly concerns the textile and wool processing activities (lead vessel), but also the storage of food and trade, especially wine, as shown by the amphorae accumulation found in one of its rooms, even more if we count the large cellar of 77 m^{2} found attached to the east (dpto. 172), and with more than 80 amphorae-jar identified, it must have been used as a storehouse for surplus goods, possibly destined for trade or internal redistribution.

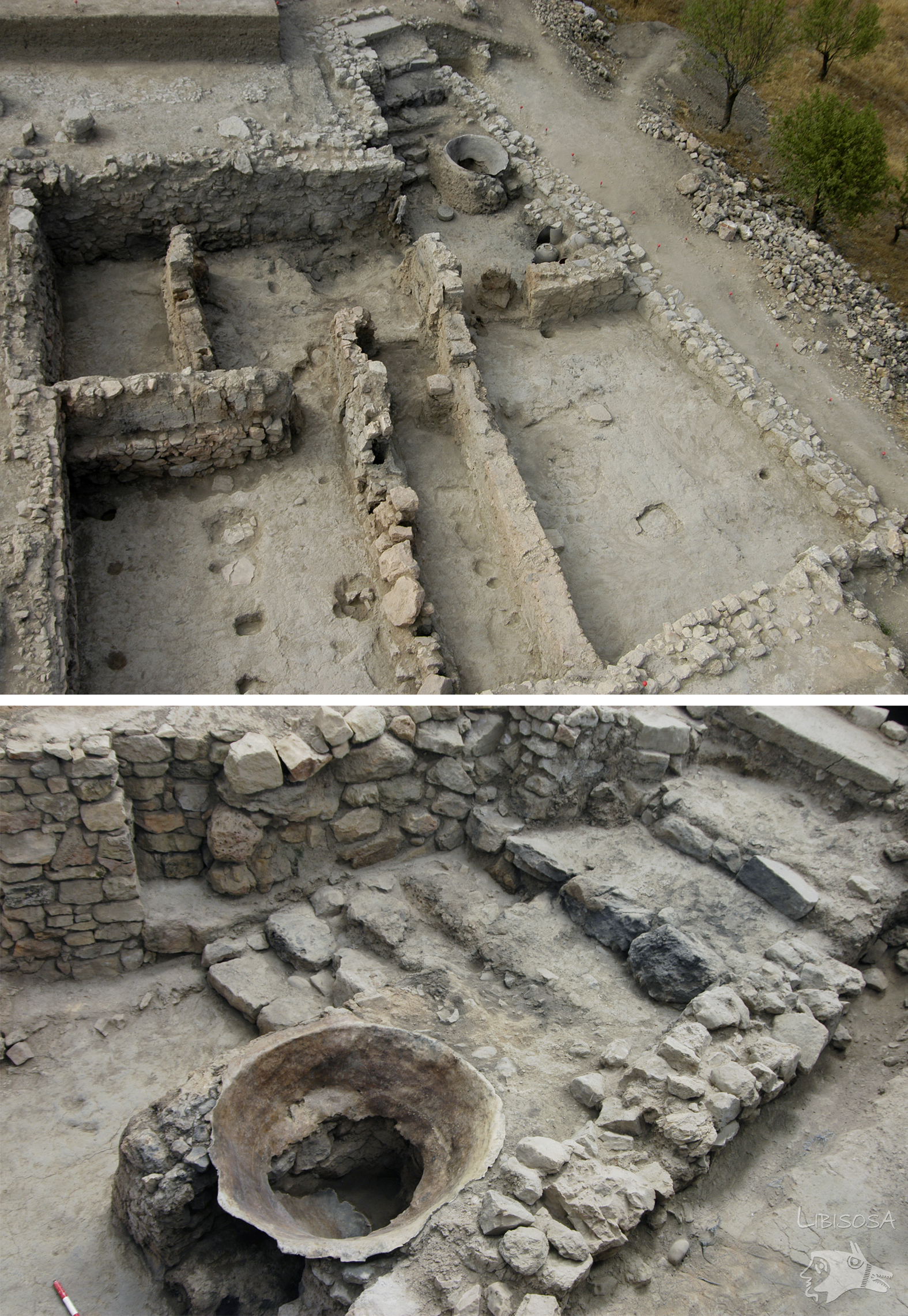
Ibero-Roman oligarchic building of Libisosa.

→ The latest investigations in Sector 18 have revealed a more complex and multifaceted panorama, and a new closed context, this one destroyed in the 2nd century BC, which seems to correspond to a cult building. From this place comes the exceptional vase of the "Goddess and the Iberian prince", which has recently been added to the permanent collection of the museum of Lezuza.

Among the latest discoveries also stands out its set of Ibero-Roman weapons and an exceptional accumulation of coins, as well as the catalog of Iberian inscriptions.

== The Roman wall ==
The dynamics of Romanization of the Iberian settlement will be dramatically interrupted, as mentioned above, when the oppidum, or at least the part known from the excavated sectors, is definitively destroyed in the context of the Sertorian wars, with one of the fighting armies settling in the highest part of the hill. Although there are no literary sources that support the affiliation of the Libyan enclave in this conflict, when in 75 B.C. Metellus defeated and killed Hirtuleius (Sertorius' legate) in the Ulterior, the general of the Silanian faction already had his hands free to go to the Hispanic east and to be able to join Pompey, who had just defeated the Sertorian Perpenna and Herennius in Valentia. And Metellus must have moved along the ancient route remembered in the Vicarello cups, the Way of Hannibal or via Heraclea, which controlled Libisosa for the passage between the South and the peninsular Levant.

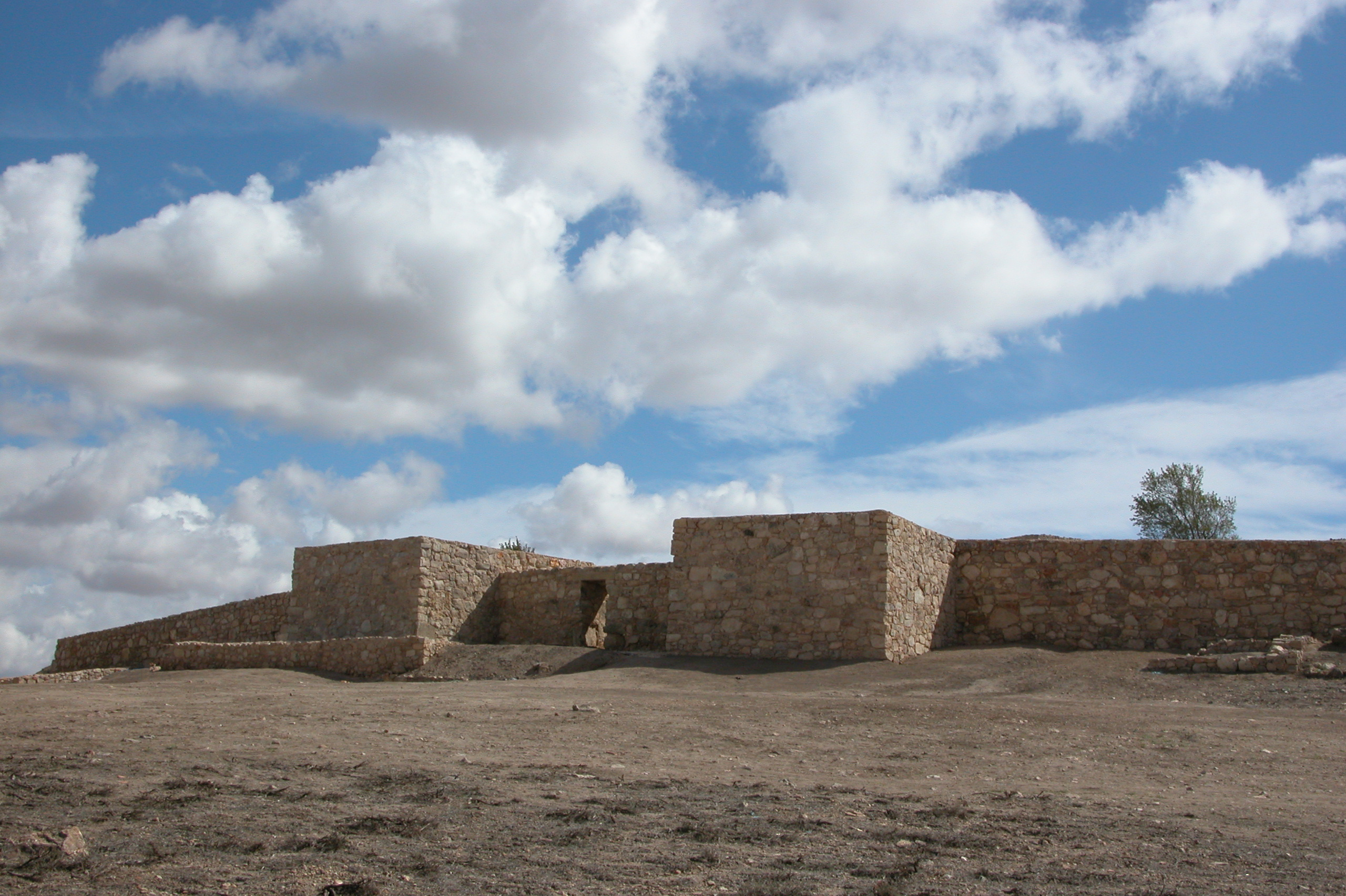
North gate of the Roman wall of Libisosa, erected on Sector 3 of the Ibero-Roman quarter.

Sector 18 is destroyed and will no longer be occupied by later populations. As for Sector 3, on the collapse of the pre-existing buildings, a three meter wide wall is hastily built, covering 9 hectares, with a double wall of ordinary dry masonry and the interior filled with stones and earth, recalling the technique of Vitruvius' emplecton (II, 8, 7), with two openings in this area, the North and Northwest Gates. The one that most affects the Iberian apartments, the North Gate, is provided with two massive bastions of rectangular tendency of about 6 m of external front, that protect a slightly flared opening of 9 m in its external part and of 7.30 m in the interior. Later, possibly in the middle of the first century A.D., when the west tower was probably already in poor condition, this door was closed, leaving only a potern.

== Libisosa Foroaugustana colony ==
After a period of difficult archaeological localization, the ancient Oretan oppidum will experience a definitive promotional leap, with its conversion into the colonia Libisosa Foroaugustana, to which Rome granted, as it is clear from the reading of Pliny the Elder (HN, III, 25), the ius italicum, the highest legal consideration, perhaps as a reward for fixing the population in this strategic area. This colonial promotion would have been conferred by Augustus to Libisosa possibly on the occasion of his third trip to Hispania, at the end of the 1st century BC.

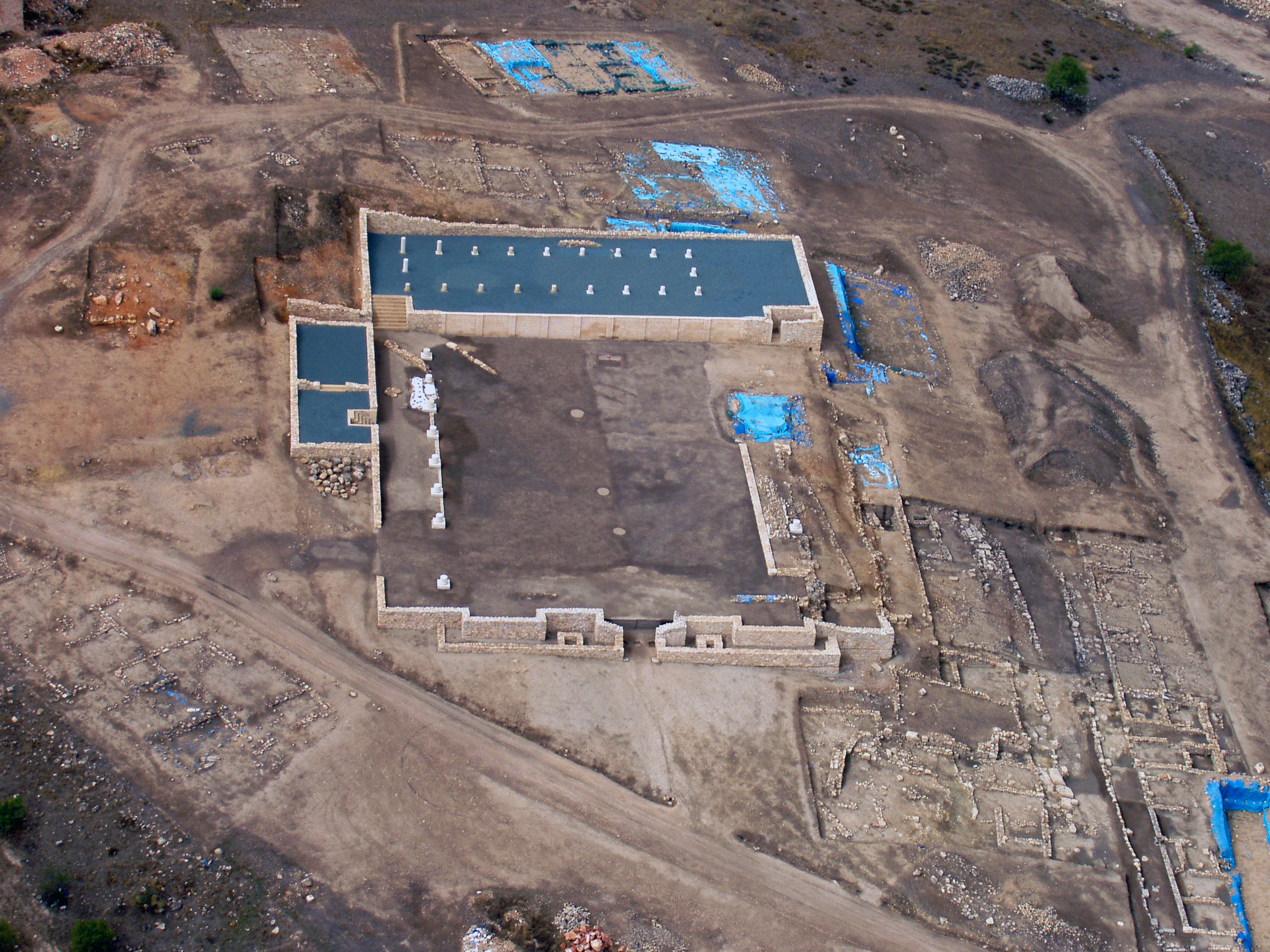
Aerial view of the Roman and Decuman forum of Libisosa, when it was in the process of being restored.

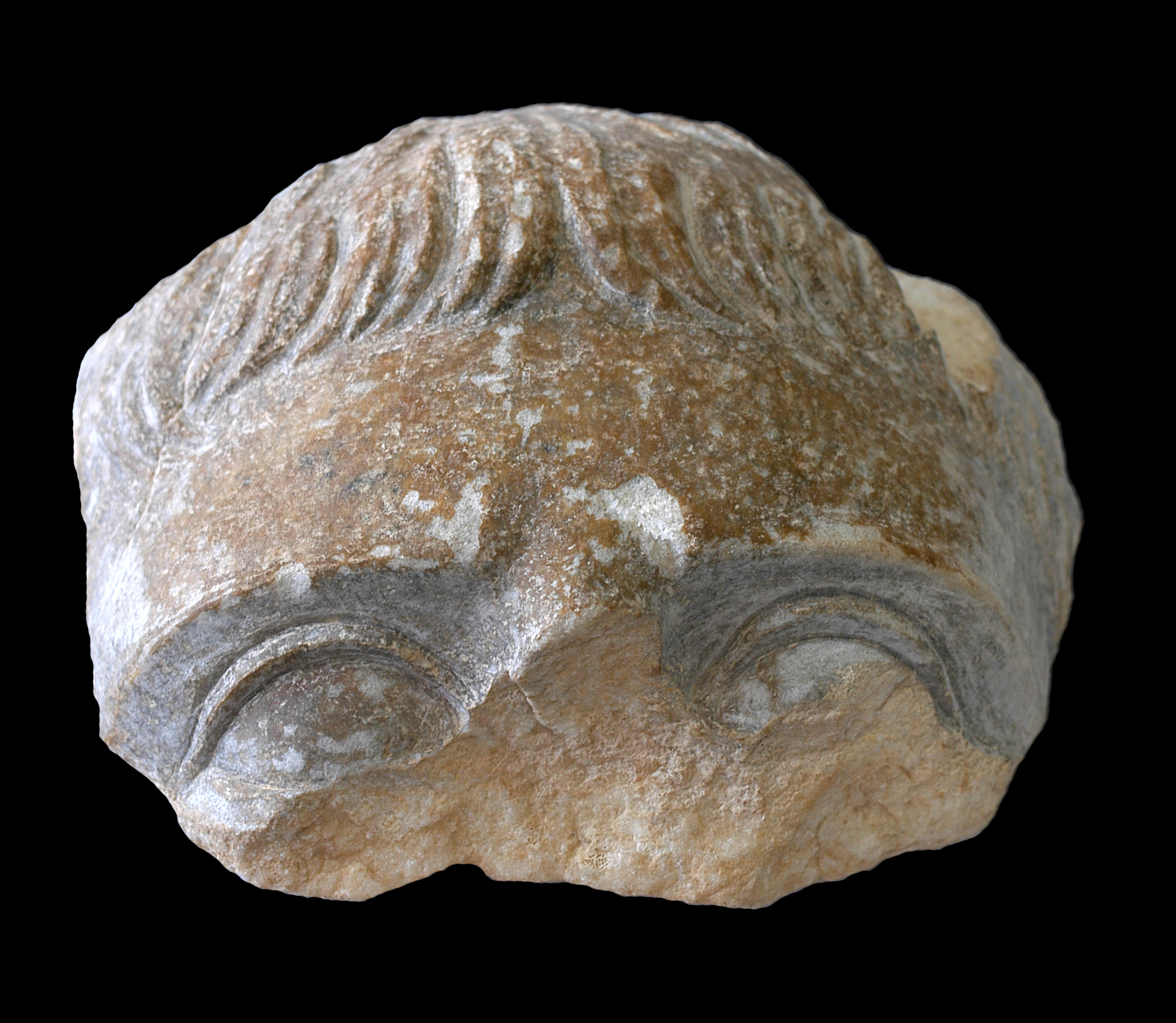
Fragment of Roman sculpture of a Julio-Claudian figure found in Libisosa.

The colonial deductio brought with it the foundation of the forum, articulated around a large square 150 feet long by 100 feet wide, which means a ratio of 3 to 2 (the ideal for Vitruvius V,1,2), for which a great engineering work of clearing to the south and terracing to the north had to be carried out, allowing the creation of this large central space with its lateral buildings in the highest and narrowest part of the hill.

- The main entrance to the forum is on the eastern side, with a façade that has two large rectangular niches, located parallel and symmetrical to the door. This access is articulated around a central opening of 3 m wide, which coincides with the geometric center of the square, and gives access to two porticoes, to the north and south of it.
- In the central axis of the forum, and next to the podium of the basilica, is the hole of the mundus. Very close to it had taken place, about a century before, an Ibero-Roman votive deposit coinciding with the period of destruction of the oppidum.
- The southern portico leads to the curia, oriented E-W and composed of two rooms, 7.15 m wide by 19.70 m long.
- On the western side is the basilica, a large rectangular building 41 m long by 14.5 m wide with two entrances from the forum square in the porticoed areas, and a double row of 9 columns inside.
- In longitudinal sense to the north portico extends another building, a possible granary, 5 m wide by 35.50 m long, without internal compartmentalization, which is being intervened in recent campaigns, as it is still an area to finish defining and valuing.
- To the west of the basilica, next to the great north-south road axis, which connects the north gate with the south, is located a large structure composed of twelve rooms or rooms belonging to a large domus, which occupies an entire block in a privileged area of the most central area of the colony, with an access on the east flank of the building, an area that seems intended for tabernae, connected to the rest of the building through an internal staircase.
- To the north of the forum, at a lower level, runs the decumanus maximus, with two lateral porticoes, facing numerous taverns. In its intersection with the basilica, there is a large cistern. Next to them, a stairway connects the decumanus maximus with the forensic plaza.

As regards the material record, archaeological excavations have recovered from the forum a large ceramic collection, but also some fragments of inscriptions, testifying to the existence of IIviri, and reiterating the belonging of the colony to the Galeria tribe; three Corinthian type capitals, various sculptural remains of togados, and portraits of Julio-Claudian characters (one of them with damnatio memoriae), coins (denarii and Republican and Imperial aces), an altar pulvinus, decorated with a rosette of five petals, etc. To these new materials provided by recent excavations it is necessary to add the ancient findings, such as the small head, preserved in the Museum of Albacete, belonging to a lady of the Libyan elite that follows the reference of the empress Iulia Agrippina Minor. Or the inscription, known from ancient times, found in Calle de los Caballeros number 3 in Tarragona, dated to the time of Hadrian, referring to an illustrious citizen of Libisosa who became a provincial flamen in Tarraco (CIL II, 4254). Or, certainly, the inscription, still preserved, in a risky condition, on an external corner of the Casa della Tercia, next to the church of the municipality, known for a long time (CIL II, 3234) and containing a dedication to Marcus Aurelius, dated between 166 and 167 A.D., offered to him by the settlers of Libisosa, and that according to the news of the scholars of the 16th and 17th century, Ambrosio de Morales and Alonso de Requena, would have appeared in union with a marble statue.

The city maintained its vitality during the High Empire, especially in the first century, according to the materials found. However, the northern part of the forum shows signs of destruction (probably related to natural causes, such as landslides or seismic movements) and its subsequent remodeling, with the restructuring of the portico and the inclusion, at least, of a kind of monumental fountain, as well as the raising of the paving levels of the forensic square.

== Medieval enclave ==
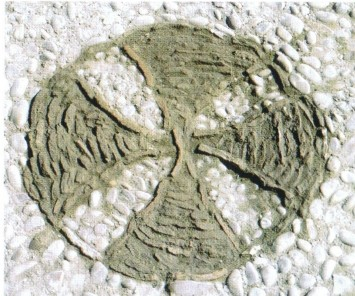
Detail of one of the medieval crosses found in Libisosa.

Archaeological remains of a watchtower and a complex of religious character are preserved from the medieval period.

- The "castle" rises on the top of the hill, about 1000 m above sea level, exercising a long-range visual control. The building has a quadrangular ground plan of 13 m on each side, and is developed in several floors with vaulted ceilings connected by a staircase that circulates inside the perimeter walls. The construction technique is the formwork, with external walls of masonry (based on limestone, sandstone, and tuff, reused from Roman monuments) and a mortar made with lime agglomerate and a siliceous aggregate of a rather coarse orange color, and small pebbles. The inner part of the thick walls is filled with the same type of mortar, although the stones are no longer placed so regularly. The building is currently undergoing a consolidation and enhancement project.

After the conquest of Alcaraz in 1213 the troops of Alfonso VIII took the castle of Lezuza. In 1411 Alcaraz exempts from tribute all the neighbors who wanted to live in the Cerro de Lezuza, next to the tower, in an attempt to increase the population in the area. Later, during the 15th century, Lezuza was involved in the conflicts between the Marquisate of Villena and the Trastámara. During the reign of the Catholic Monarchs and throughout the 16th century, the town grew due to the granting of the status of villa to Lezuza, but the Cerro del Castillo was abandoned as a place of habitat, and the settlement was established on the plain, around the new church.

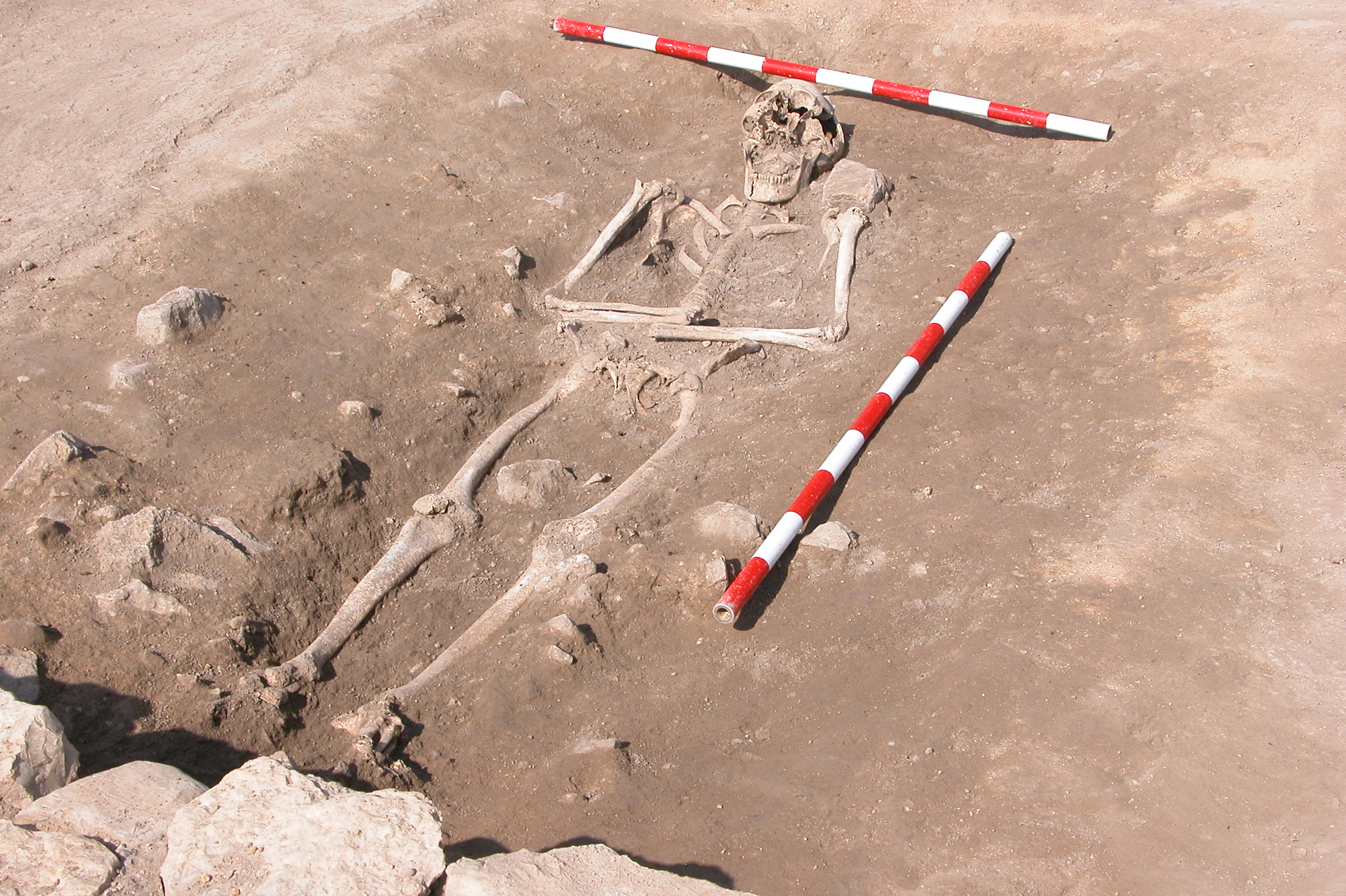
Burial of a member of the Military Orders in the late medieval complex of Libisosa.

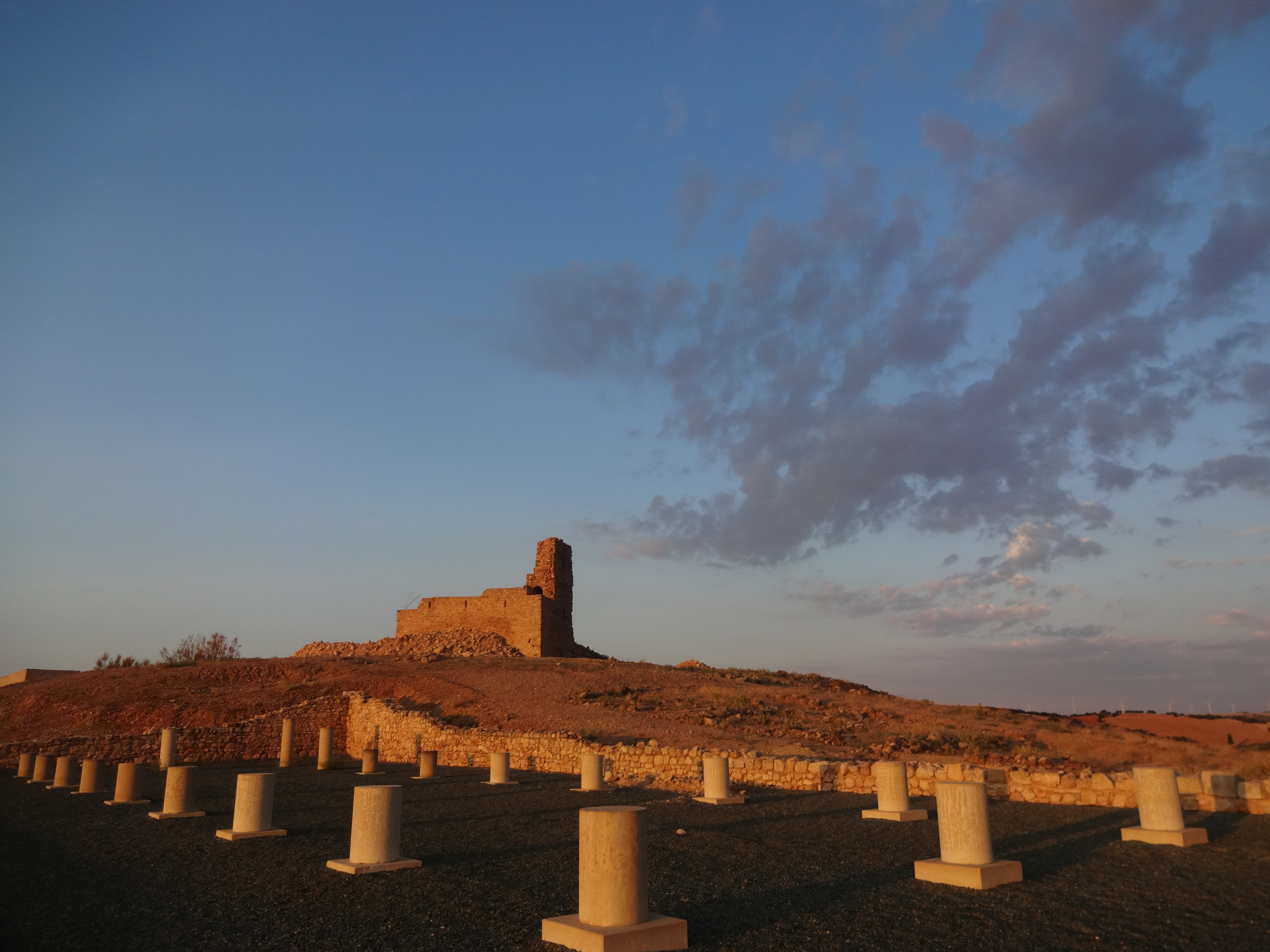
Watchtower of Libisosa seen from the Roman Basilica

- In Sector 11 of the site, to the northeast of the forum and affecting some taverns of the decumanus maximus, a large building has been documented, a politico-religious complex to be put in relation to the Military Orders, composed of three parts: a large rectangular courtyard to the north, with a cistern or silo, compartmentalized by partitions that reuse walls from the Iberian and Roman periods, a set of southern rooms, using walls from the taverns of the decumanus, and in which a male burial was found, and an elongated central room that articulates the structure of the building, bringing together its representative and religious functions - church or basilical hall-, that presents an interesting internal hierarchy of spaces, as it is divided into two parts. The larger one (17.50 by 4.65 m of internal span), to the west, has a bench running along its three sides and a pavement of boulders, of medium and small size, with two embedded kicked crosses, formed by fragments of tile, thus establishing a link with the Military Orders. The smaller room, dedicated to the cult, of quadrangular form (4'65 m of side), separated by an arch of the previous one, conserves the pavement of brick, and an elevated structure, in the form of altar, supported in the east wall. The monetary findings indicate a frequentation of the place from the 13th to the 17th century. The building is protected and buried while awaiting funding for its restoration and exhibition to the public.
