= Tomelloso =

- Municipality
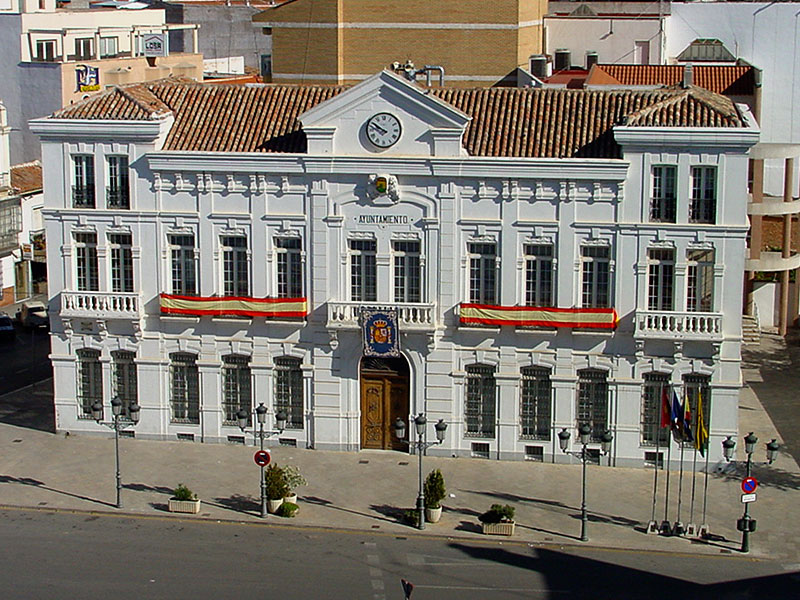
- Town Hall

- Flag Coat of arms

- Location in Spain
- Coordinates: 39°09′28″N 3°01′15″W
- Country: Spain
- Autonomous community: Castile-La Mancha
- Province: Ciudad Real
- Comarca: Mancha Alta

Government
  - Mayor: Inma Jiménez

Area
  - Total: 241.3 km^{2} (93.2 sq mi)
- Elevation: 662 m (2,172 ft)

Population (2025-01-01)
  - Total: 37,060
  - Density: 153.6/km^{2} (397.8/sq mi)
- Demonym(s): Tomelloseros, Tomellosanos
- Time zone: UTC+1 (CET)
  - Summer (DST): UTC+2 (CEST)
- Postal code: 13700
- Website: Official website

Tomelloso (Spanish: [tomeˈʎoso]) is a municipality located in the northeast of the province of Ciudad Real, within the autonomous community of Castile-La Mancha in Spain. Situated in the geographic center of the natural region of La Mancha and with a population of 36,304 (2023) it is the most populous municipality in the comarca and ranks as the eighth largest in Castilla-La Mancha.

The municipal territory is predominantly flat, except in the southeast, where the land gently rises to form the Campo de Montiel plateau. The area is characterized by extensive vineyards, with smaller areas dedicated to cereal crops, olive trees, pistachios, almond trees, and other irrigated crops. Tree coverage is sparse. The municipality is crossed only by the Córcoles and Záncara rivers (the latter forming the boundary with Pedro Muñoz), although several seasonal streambeds are evident during periods of heavy rainfall. Since the Middle Ages, the area has been traversed by a branch of the Cañada Real Conquense, an ancient drovers' road.

Tomelloso shares its northern border with Pedro Muñoz, its eastern border with Socuéllamos, its southern border with Argamasilla de Alba and Alhambra, and its western border with Campo de Criptana and Arenales de San Gregorio.

== History ==
The Archaeological Survey of Tomelloso reveals evidence of Paleolithic, Bronze Age, Iron Age, Roman, and Arab settlements within the municipal territory, predating its definitive establishment as a populated area around 1530.

During the Roman period, the area was known to be inhabited, with at least one Roman villa dedicated to agriculture and livestock. Similarly, there is evidence of the existence of an "alquería" (a rural farmhouse or settlement) during the Muslim rule. After the Christian victory at the Battle of Las Navas de Tolosa in 1212, the current municipal territory of Tomelloso came under the control of the Military Order of Santiago, following an agreement with the Order of Saint John in 1237.

Tomelloso is first mentioned in historical records, specifically as "Los Tomillosos", during a visit by the Military Order of Santiago to Socuéllamos in 1494.

== Main sights ==
=== Posada de los Portales ===
Located in the Plaza de España, the Posada de los Portales was constructed in the latter half of the 17th century to serve as a lodging for travelers and their horses. It maintained this function until the 1960s, when it was acquired by the Town Council. The building retains its original structure, featuring a portico supported by four Tuscan columns and two pillars. The two floors above have continuous wooden balconies. The inn also preserves its original kitchen, complete with a large chimney hood and many period utensils.

Today, the Posada de los Portales hosts rotating exhibitions across two of its three floors, which have been transformed into gallery spaces.

=== Town Hall ===
The Town Hall, located adjacent to the Posada de los Portales, was built in 1904 and has been recently restored.

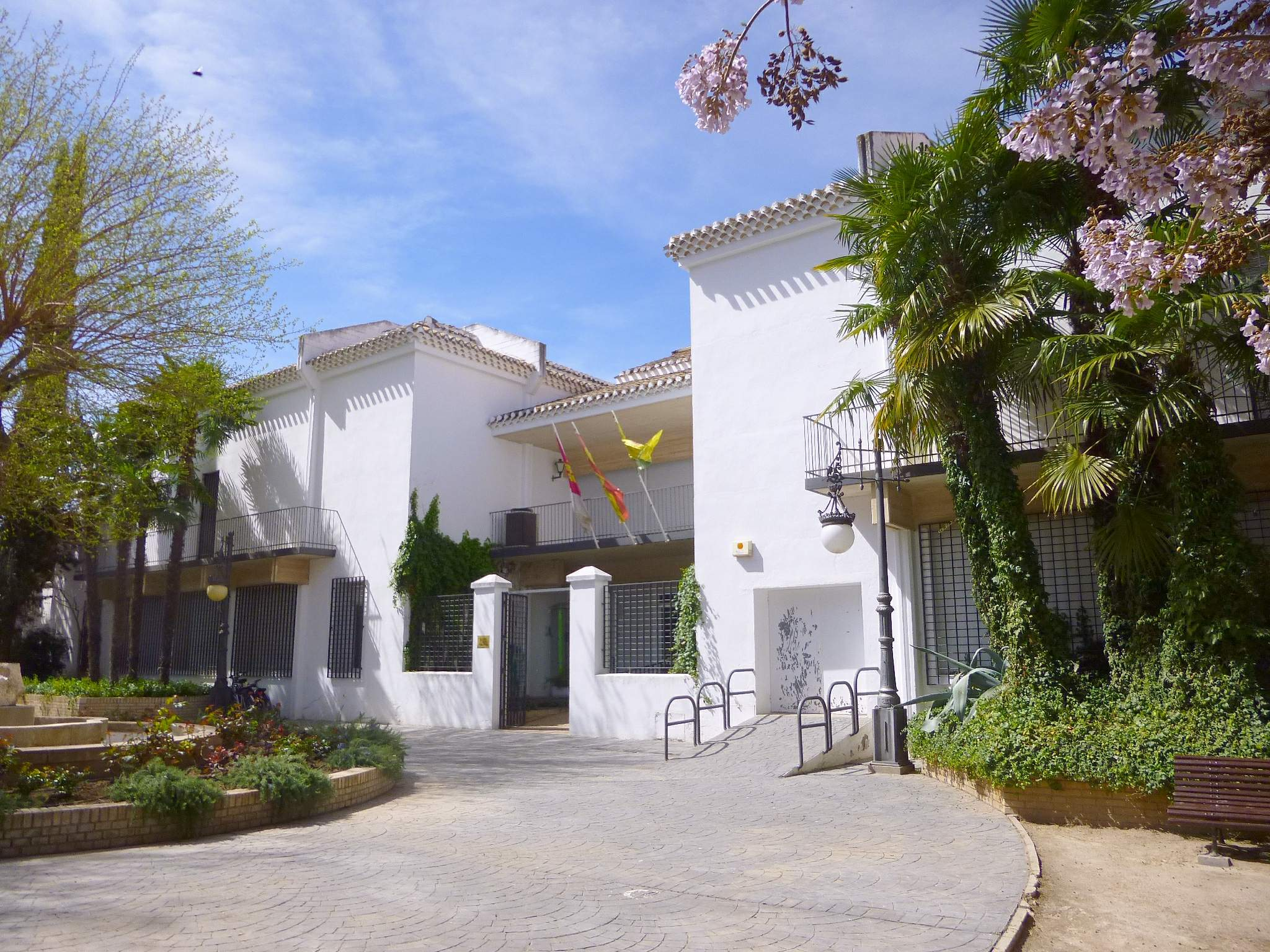
Antonio López Torres Museum (1986)

=== Antonio López Torres Museum and Cultural Center ===
The Antonio López Torres Museum, designed by architect Fernando Higueras, was inaugurated in 1986 and is municipally owned. It is situated on the street named after the painter. The museum houses a permanent exhibition of works donated by López Torres in two galleries, while a third gallery is used for temporary exhibitions.

=== Caves and the House of Painter and Mayor Francisco Carretero ===
As of 1999, Tomelloso had approximately 2,300 caves dug beneath its surface for wine storage. These caves have exterior openings called "lumbreras", which are ventilation grilles easily seen on the sidewalks. Many of these caves still contain the traditional clay and cement vats, along with other wine-making tools.

Some caves are open to the public, such as the one at the House of Francisco Carretero, located on the street named after him. This building also houses the Municipal Conservatory of Music and exhibition halls featuring works by the painter.

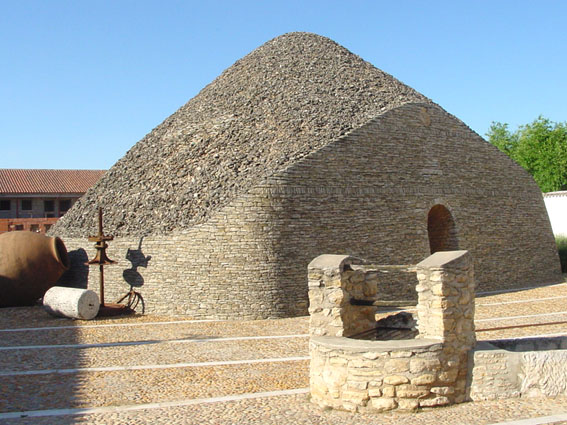
Bombo of the Carriage Museum

=== Carriage Museum ===
The Carriage Museum is located on the outskirts of the city, along the road to Pedro Muñoz. It is a large, spacious building, designed to suit the needs of the museum while reflecting the traditional style of the Manchegan region. The museum contains an extensive collection related to agricultural work, including carts, vehicles, tools, and machinery.

Within the museum grounds stands a typical regional construction known as a "bombo". This large structure is built using traditional materials and techniques, closely following the proportions and layout of authentic bombos still found scattered across the Manchegan countryside. These structures are exemplary of the dry-stone construction method, recognized by UNESCO as an Intangible Cultural Heritage of Humanity in 2018. The bombo is a rural building, typical of Tomelloso and its surroundings, used to house farmers, their families, farming tools, and animals during fieldwork. The structure is roughly circular, with thick walls and topped by a vaulted ceiling. It is built with limestone slabs laid without any cement, resulting in a sturdy, self-supporting structure. The entrance, which may be topped with a lintel or an arch, faces south and is complemented by a chimney. These are the only openings to the outside.

=== Infanta Elena Contemporary Art Museum ===
The Infanta Elena Contemporary Art Museum was inaugurated on November 23, 2011. Spanning 1,700 square meters across four floors, the museum houses the permanent collection acquired over the years by the Virgen de las Viñas Cooperative through its cultural competition, along with temporary exhibitions.

== Culture ==
=== Leisure and dining ===
Tomelloso offers several areas where most of the bars and restaurants are concentrated:

- Avenida Antonio Huertas: Known locally as "Los Paseos", this long avenue is lined with restaurants, ice cream parlors, and pubs, making it a popular spot for dining and nightlife.
- Calle Monte-Azucena and Surroundings: Referred to as "La Zona" by locals, this network of streets features several iconic bars, including the Irish-themed pub Mónaco and the rock-themed pub Memphis.
- Plaza de España: Located in the city center, this plaza hosts a few establishments where visitors can enjoy a meal or a beer.

=== Activities ===
Tomelloso offers a variety of wine tourism programs for wine enthusiasts interested in exploring the history, cultivation, harvest, production, storage, and taste of wine through visits to vineyards and wineries. These tours are organized by the wineries themselves or local tourism agencies.

Seven kilometers from Tomelloso lies Argamasilla de Alba, the town where Miguel de Cervantes was imprisoned and began writing Don Quixote of La Mancha. Visitors can tour his prison, now serving as a tourist information center.

Approximately thirty kilometers from Tomelloso, the Lagunas de Ruidera offer a natural environment, both hydrologically and ecologically. Visitors can enjoy kayaking, horseback riding, hiking, and wildlife spotting along prepared trails. The area also features a campground and motorhome parking, as well as bus services that shuttle visitors around the lagoons during the summer. It's a family vacation destination.

Tourist information about Tomelloso is available at the Posada de los Portales, located in the Plaza de España.

=== Festivals and celebrations ===
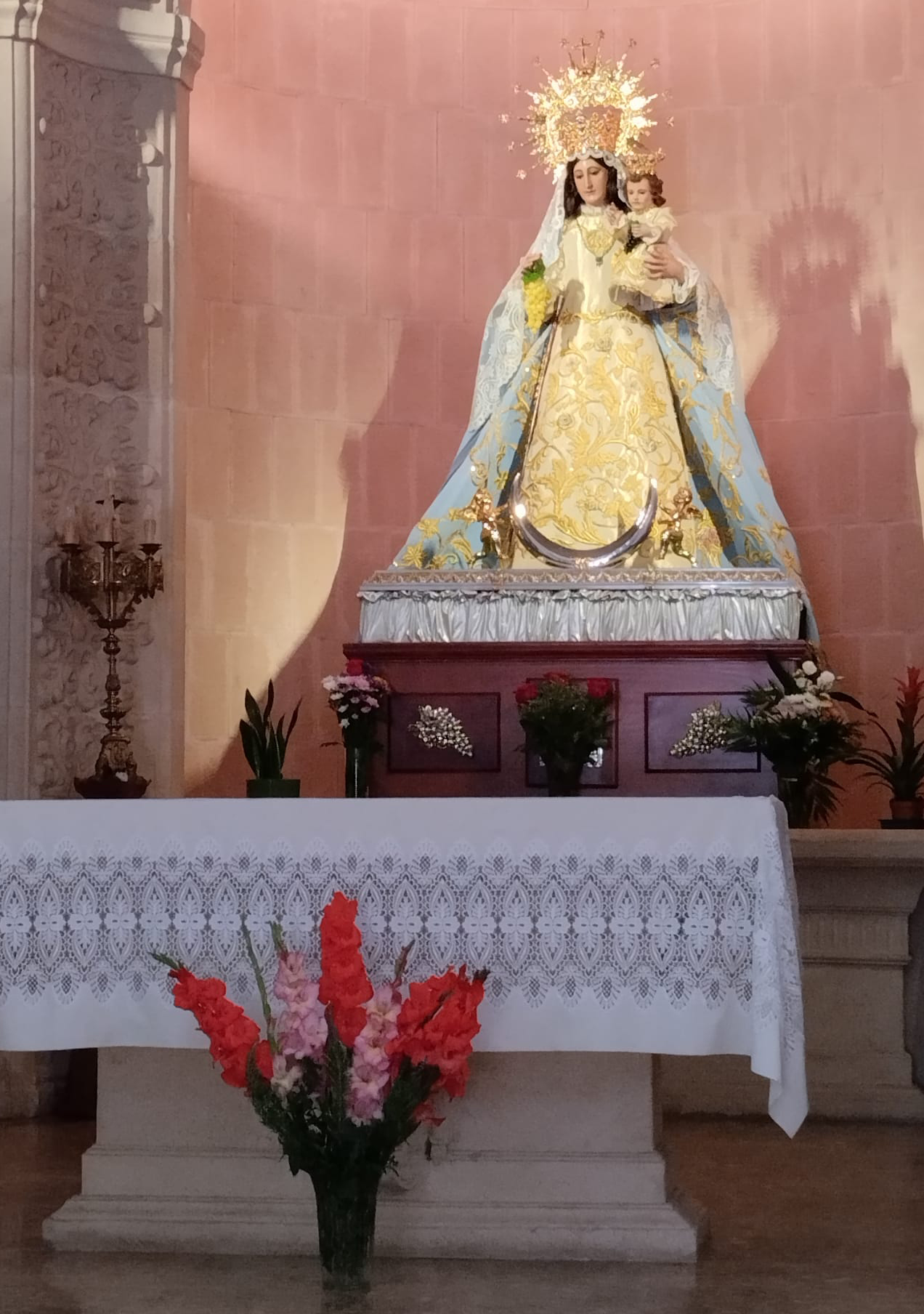
Image of the Virgen de las Viñas, Patroness of Tomelloso (Ciudad Real)

Tomelloso hosts many local festivals, but the two major events are the Romería and the Feria:

- Romería: Held in honor of the patroness, the Virgen de las Viñas, this pilgrimage takes place on the last weekend of April at the Pinilla Sanctuary, located on the road to Pedro Muñoz. From Thursday through the main day, Sunday, folkloric dances and processions are held around the sanctuary. During the weekend, locals flock to the "tascas", tents where they can listen to "rociera", traditional Andalusian music, as well as increasingly popular commercial music. A bus service runs between the town and the Pinilla Sanctuary. On Sunday, the townspeople walk back to Tomelloso with the Virgin. Young people form "peñas", groups that purchase T-shirts with images of the Virgin and their names and participate in a kind of rave where they douse each other in calimocho before returning with the Virgin to the town.
- Feria: Celebrated during the last week of August, the fairgrounds, located between the Parque de la Constitución and Calle Lugo, come alive with stalls, tombolas, and rides. Over the course of a week, various activities are held for all ages at the fairgrounds, Plaza de España, and several parks around the town. It is one of the most attended fairs in the region and in Spain, attracting over 300,000 visitors who spend approximately 15 million euros.

Carnival has also grown in importance over the years, though it doesn't reach the same level as the Romería or Feria. The Carnival features parades with schools, neighborhood associations, and local groups, as well as participants from other towns.

== Twin towns ==
- Bir Lehlu, Western Sahara
- Ibi, Spain
- Lepe, Spain
- Niort, France
