= Ojuelo =

River in Spain

Ojuelo River
- Native name: Río Ojuelo (Spanish)

Physical characteristics
- Source: Hill near El Bonillo
  - coordinates: 38.95906°N 2.49358°W
  - elevation: 1095m
- Mouth: Córcoles River
  - location: Munera
  - coordinates: 39.03819°N 2.49171°W
  - elevation: 883m
- Length: 9 km (5.6 mi)

Basin features
- Progression: Córcoles→Acequia de Socuéllamos→Záncara→Cigüela→ Guadiana→ Gulf of Cádiz

Ojuelo is a river of the Province of Albacete, Spain, in the upper reaches of the Guadiana drainage basin. It flows for circa 9 kilometres (6 mi) into the Córcoles River where it passes under the N-430 highway, and has its source near El Bonillo.
