= Consuegra Dam =

- Interactive map of Consuegra Dam
- Official name: Presa Romana de Consuegra
- Location: Toledo province, Castilla-La Mancha, Spain
- Coordinates: 39°25′46.4″N 3°39′17.5″W
- Opening date: 3rd or 4th century

Dam and spillways
- Impounds: Amarguillo
- Height: 4.8 m
- Length: >632.0 m
- Width (base): 2.6 m

The Consuegra Dam is a ruined Roman buttress dam in Toledo province, Castilla–La Mancha, Spain. The dam dates to the 3rd or 4th century AD. It is on the River Amarguillo upstream from Consuegra.

Although less than 5 metres high, the dam was remarkably long, over 600 metres. The reservoir seems to have had a dual function of supplying water to Consuegra and irrigating farmland. The settlement dates back to pre-Roman times and was important enough in Roman times to have a circus.

The river Amarguillo has an irregular flow and in 1891 a flood badly damaged the town of Consuegra. The dam may also have suffered damage at this time.

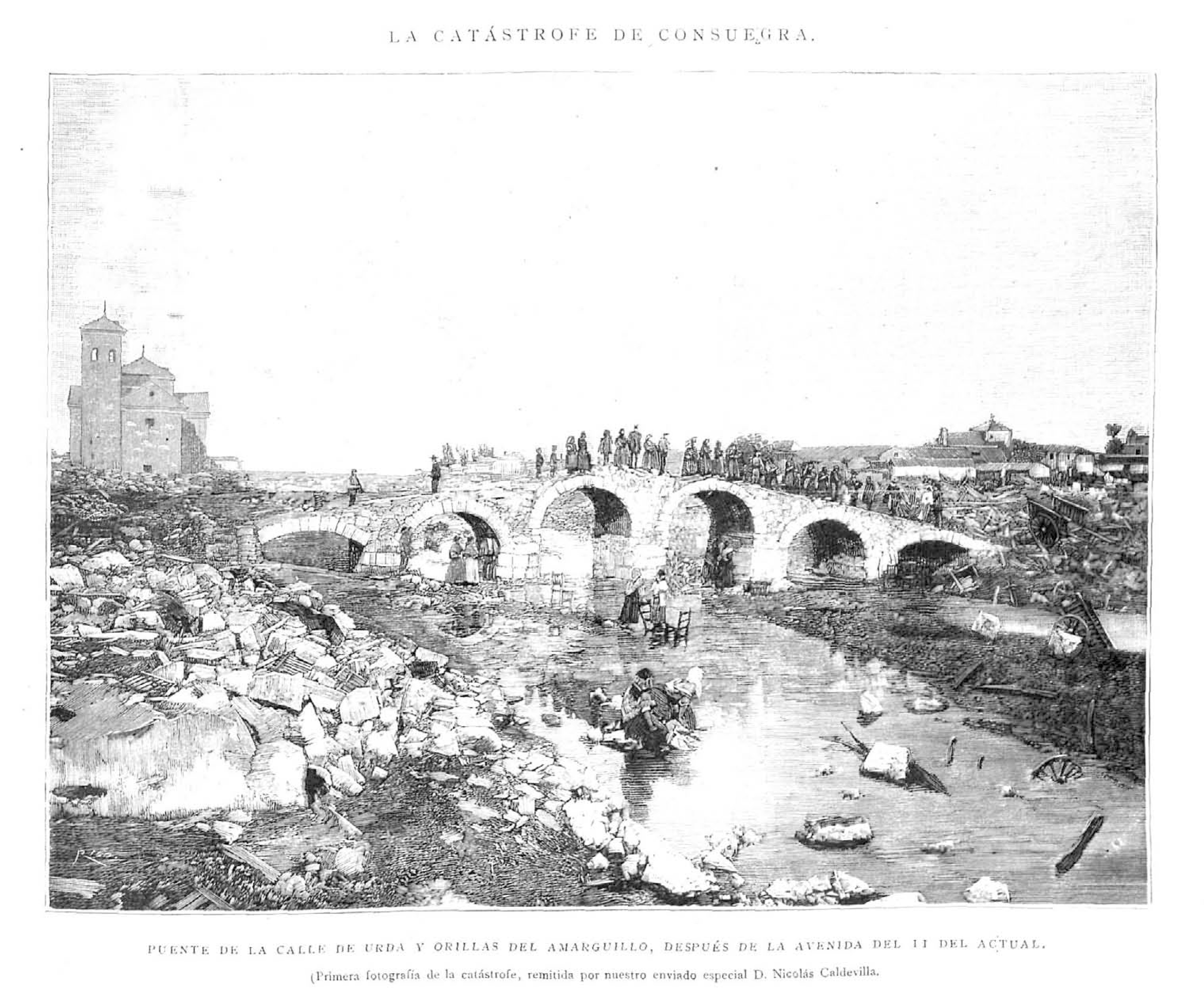
The aftermath of a flood of the river Amarguillo

== Conservation ==
The structure is protected by the heritage listing Bien de Interés Cultural.

== See also ==
- List of Roman dams and reservoirs
- Roman architecture
- Roman engineering
