= Córcoles =

River in Spain

Córcoles River
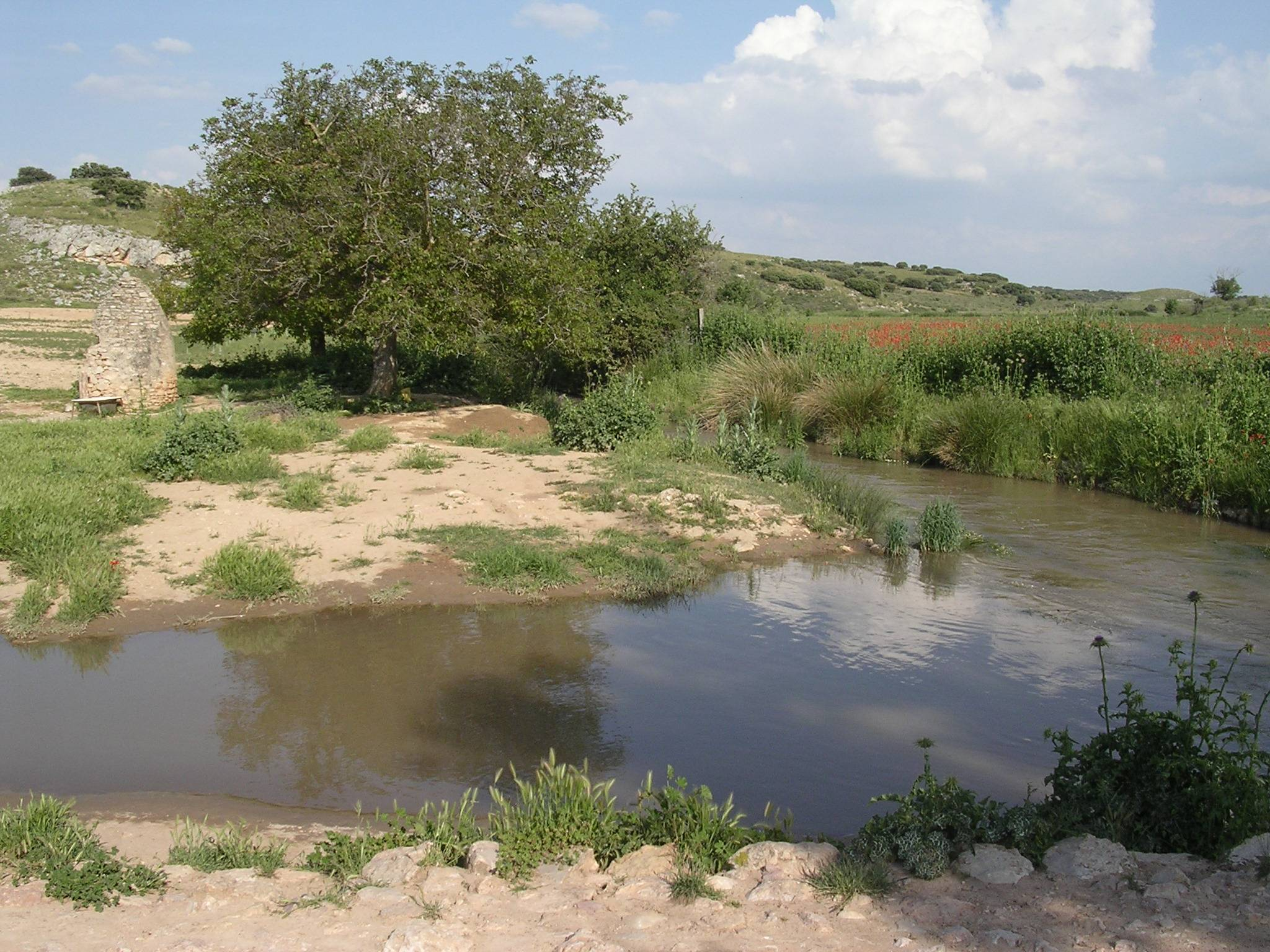
- Native name: Río Córcoles (Spanish)

Physical characteristics
- Source
  - location: Hills near Lezuza
  - coordinates: 38.99293°N 2.43605°W
- Mouth: Acequia de Socuéllamos
  - location: near Socuéllamos
  - coordinates: 39.31503°N 2.89975°W

Basin features
- Tributaries
  - left: Ojuelo; Canada Marin; Canada Serrano; Canada de la Senora; Rio de Sotuelamos
  - right: Vallejo Cotono; Vallejo Morra San Telmo; Canada del Moreno

Córcoles is a river of provinces of Albacete and Ciudad Real, Castile-La Mancha, Spain.

It is a right-bank tributary of the Acequia de Socuéllamos, itself a tributary of the Záncara, a river of the basin of the Guadiana. It rises in the hills near Lezuza.

Córcoles is 88 kilometres (55 mi) long.

There are 17 watermills on the river.
