= Pedro Muñoz =

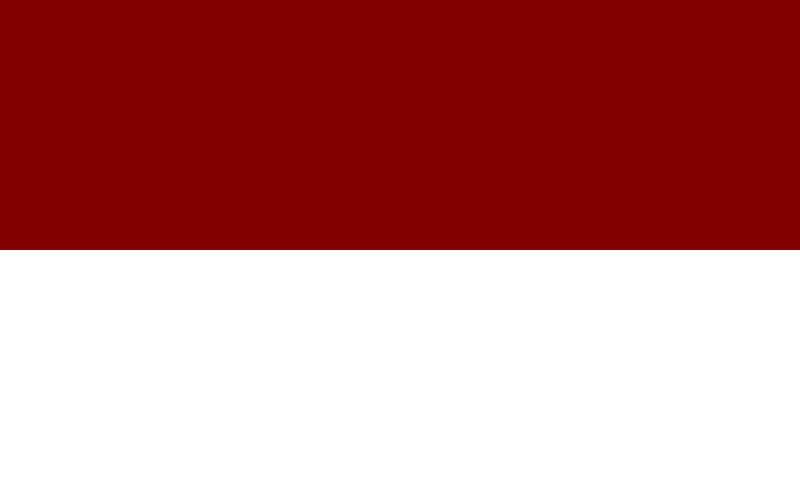
- Flag Coat of arms

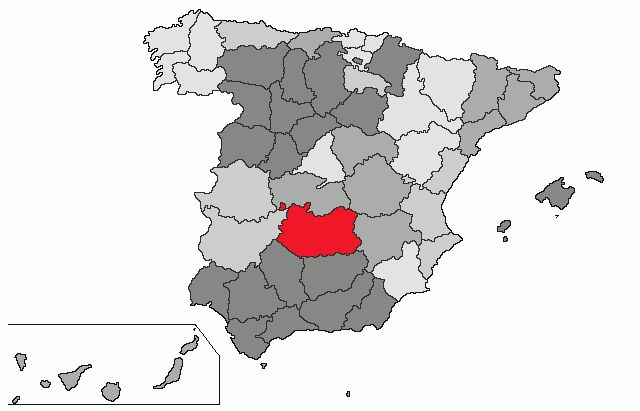
- Location in Spain, in the province of Ciudad Real
- Country: Spain
- Autonomous community: Castile-La Mancha
- Province: Ciudad Real
- Founded: 1284 AD

Government
  - Mayor: Alberto Lara Fonseca (PP)

Area
  - Total: 101.3 km^{2} (39.1 sq mi)
- Elevation: 656 m (2,152 ft)

Population (2025-01-01)
  - Total: 7,585
- Time zone: UTC+1 (CET)
  - Summer (DST): UTC+2 (CEST)
- Postal code: 167898
- Area code: 34 (Spain) + 926 (Ciudad Real)
- Website: www.pedro-munoz.es (in Spanish)

Pedro Muñoz is a municipality in the autonomous community of Castile-La Mancha, Spain. It is located in the northeast corner of the province of Ciudad Real, on the bank of the Záncara river. It is in the La Mancha region, in the "Mancha Alta" sub-region. It was founded in 1284 by the Archdeacon of Alcaraz, Pero Muñoz (later adjusted to "Pedro" Muñoz in the municipality's name), as one of a series of defensible points in the La Mancha plains. The village was abandoned in 1410, due to a severe drought, and re-established in 1525. Since the late 19th century, Pedro Muñoz had been an important economic center in the region.

The village has an important architectural heritage of manor houses, hermitages and the Renaissance and Baroque church of St Peter the Apostle. It also has a natural and ecological heritage composed of a protected complex of wetlands, visited by many species of migratory birds.

== Geography ==
The municipality is bound to the north by El Toboso, to the west by Campo de Criptana, to the east by Mota del Cuervo and to the south by Socuéllamos and Tomelloso. It has a total area of 101.3 km^{2} and is located 113 km from the provincial capital. Although it is at a comparatively high altitude, the region itself is flat, on an arid but fertile plateau. It is a typical village in La Mancha with a concentrated population and low-rise housing, typical of the region.

Pedro Muñoz is located in the southern part of the Meseta Central (inner plateau) of the Iberian Peninsula, on the Záncara River in the Guadiana River Basin. The municipality has a nature reserve surrounding a complex of seven lakes: La Vega or Laguna del Pueblo (Town Lake) wetland is considered "green"; Alcahozo, Manjavacas and Monte Chico are salt lakes; and Retamar and Navalafuente are endorheic lakes (not providing any outflow of water such as streams or rivers).

=== Hydrography and lakes ===
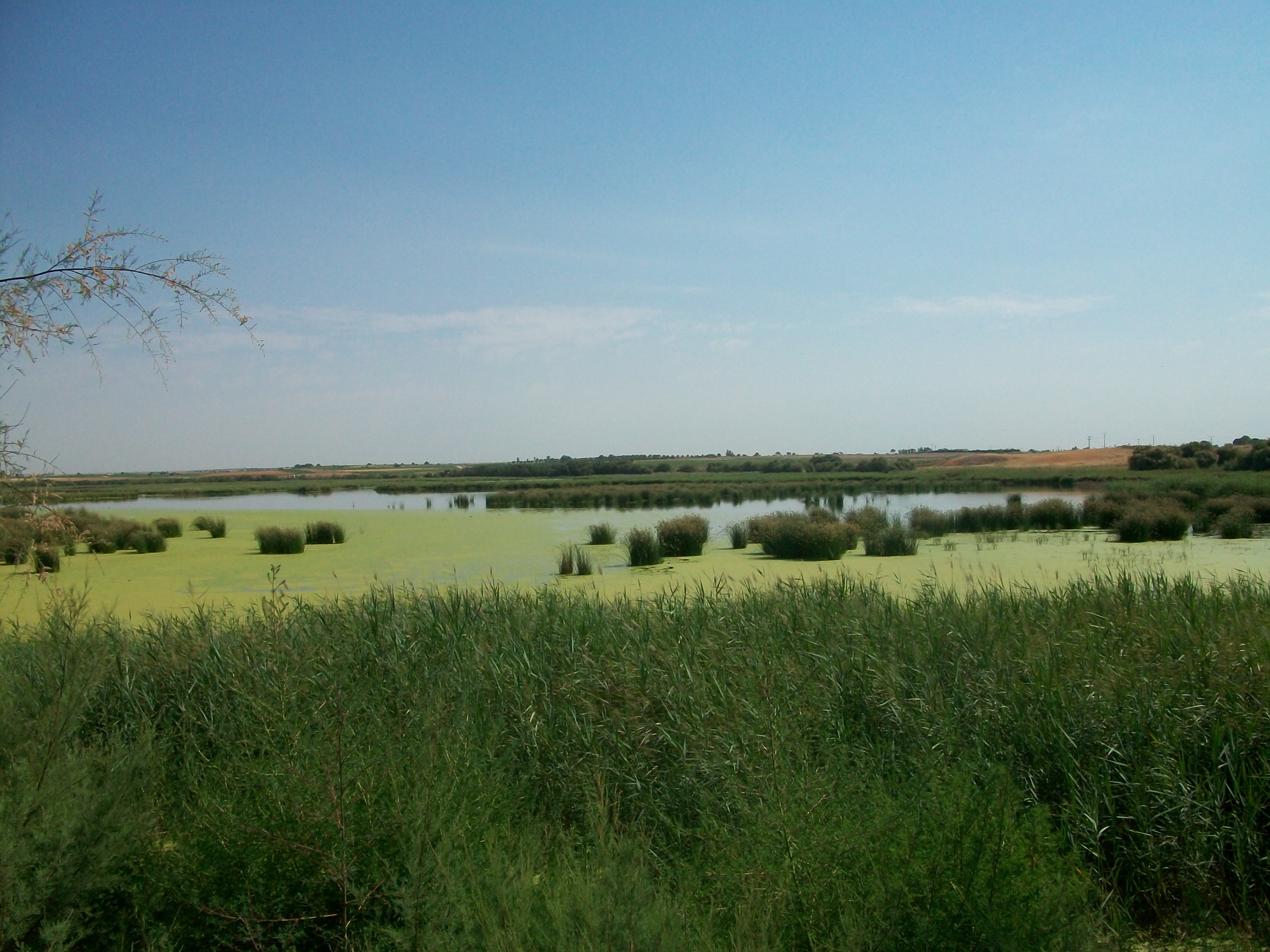
Vega Lake

The boundaries of Pedro Muñoz are within the drainage basin of the Záncara River, a tributary of the Guadiana, and host the wetland complex of Pedro Muñoz, made up of three principal lakes: Vega Lake, Retemar Lake and Navalafuente Lake. This wetland complex was declared a nature reserve in 2002, after receiving the following statements of protection: the wildlife refuge of Vega Lake in 1988, a special protection area for birds (ESPA) in 1989 and a wetland of international importance as a habitat for waterfowl (Ramsar Convention) in 1993. The biosphere reserve of the Wetlands Area was declared by UNESCO in 1981 and comprises a set of lakes and marshes in La Mancha.

Vega Lake is the most important of the complex. It is a sweetwater lake which encourages the growth of non-halophytic vegetation. It has a surface area of 54 hectares and in summer is supplied with water from the treatment plant which alters its natural hydro-chemical composition from flooding and drought. The fauna is abundant with more than 23 species of waterfowl, most notably ducks and waders. Others can be found in the list of the Ramsar Convention.

Navalafuente is an ephemeral or intermittent lake that is formed in very rainy years. Retemar is a purely endorheic lake.

=== Flora and fauna ===
==== Flora ====
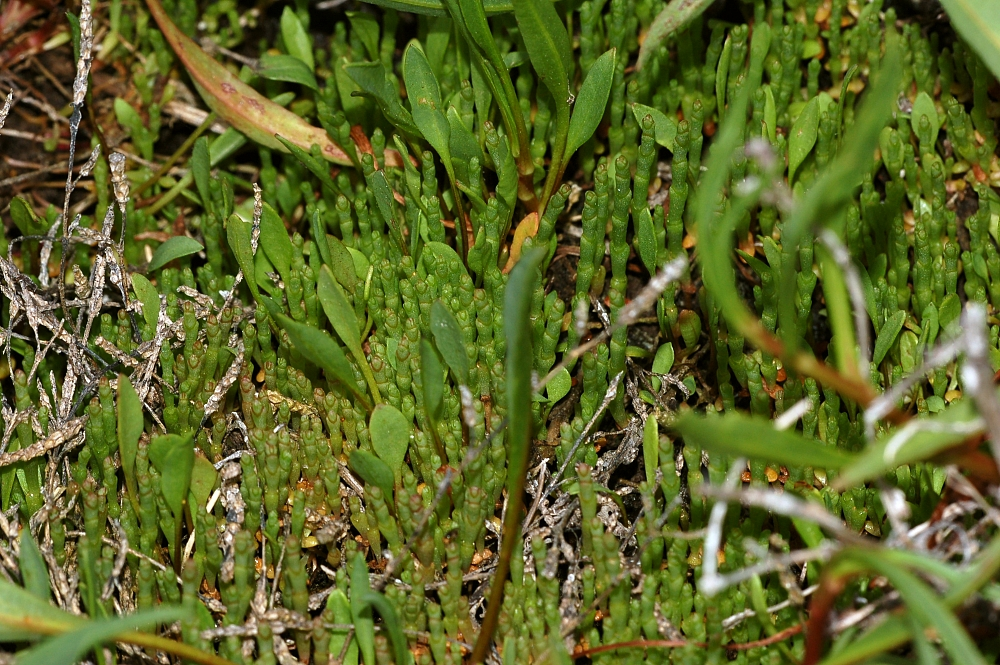
Salicornia, (Salicornia ramosissima)

In the wetland areas there are halophytic plants that have adapted to the salty substrate where chlorides and sulphates have concentrated. In these areas the growth is sparse.

In the permanent lakes there is abundant aquatic vegetation supported by the fertile mud on the floor of the lakes, attracting large numbers of waders. There is also vegetation rooted in the lake beds with leaves and flowers floating on or emergent from the surface. Typical plants around the lake are Salicornia, Juncaceae, glasswort (Arthrocnemum macrostachyum) and Phragmites species.

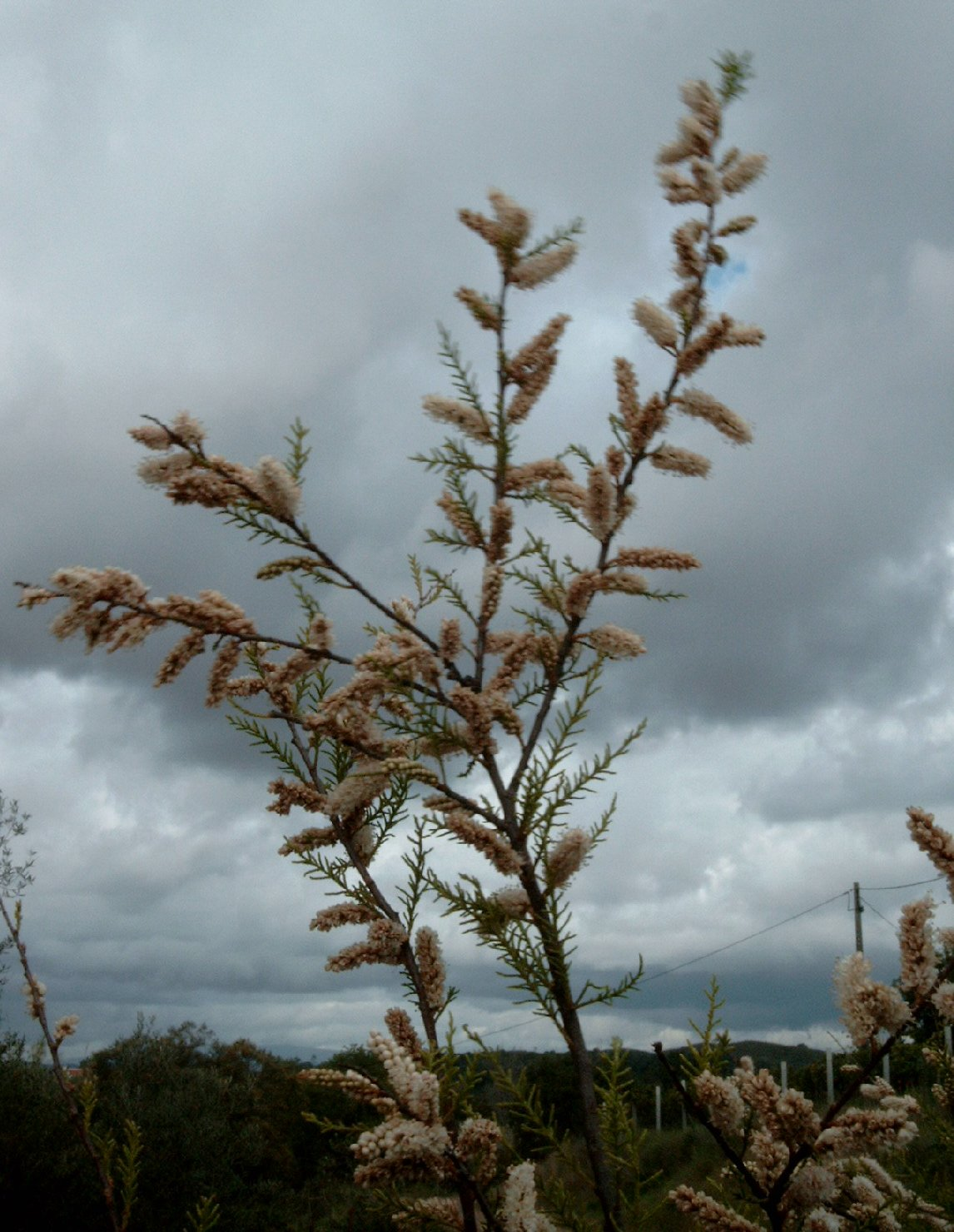
Taray (Tamarix africana)

Halophytic rushes grow in the boggy areas. Also important are the sedges and sow thistles which reproduce easily in areas that are less salty. There are also saw-toothed sedge and bull rushes. Nearby in the salty meadows are plantains and grama grass, and a range of aromatic herbs such as rosemary, thyme and mint.

The most common tree, particularly in the more saline areas, is the tamarisk or salt cedar. It forms little thickets around the edge of the lakes, and has a long taproot that is able to reach the water table and thus resist the summer drought. Other trees that thrive in the area are the evergreen or holly oak, poplar species, almond, Acacia species and pines.

==== Fauna ====
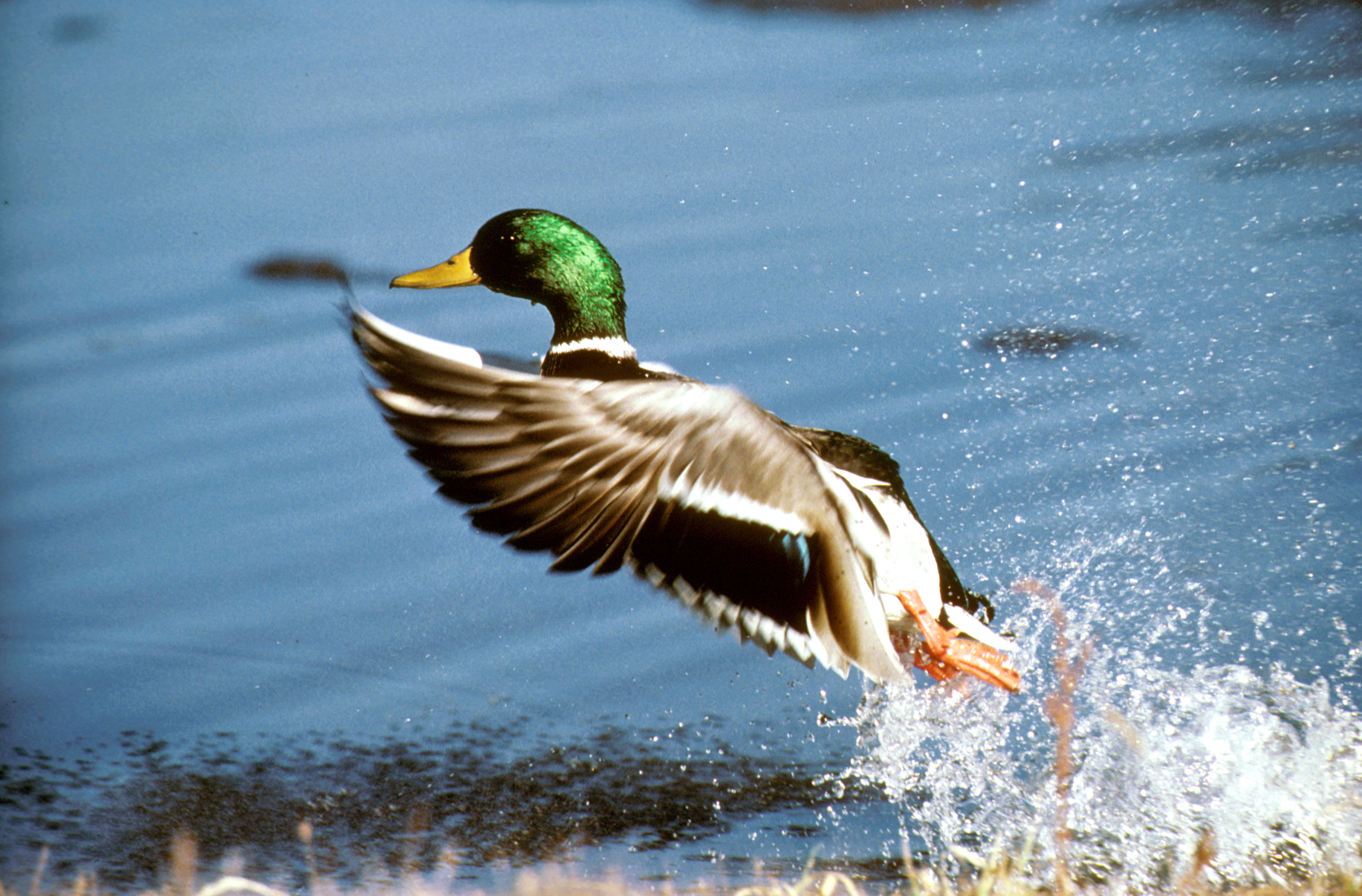
Mallard drake (Anas platyrhynchos)

The wetlands complex is an important natural element to assist the migration of birds between Africa and the north of Europe, despite the high salinity of the water and the summer drought. The presence of crustaceans that can resist the summer drought are fundamental for feeding many waterbirds.

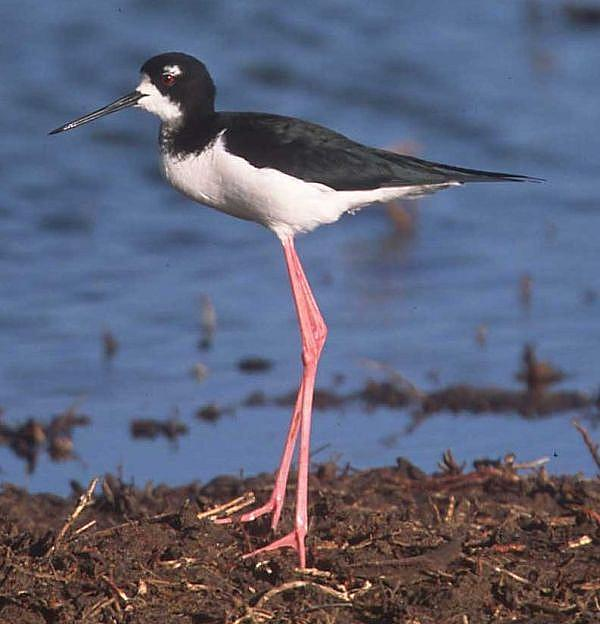
Black-necked stilt (Hemantiopus hemantiopus)

In the fringes of rushes and sedges there are many ducks, like the mallard. Sedentary birds who nest and winter on the lake are sometimes seen, including the black-necked grebe, the coot and the common pochard. Other more common birds which overwinter on the lakes are the shoveler duck, the northern pintail, the eurasian teal and the little grebe. In areas of thicker vegetation the purple heron nests during spring and migrates in August to over-winter in other places. In the salty areas are wading birds such as the black-winged stilt and the avocet.

Among non-aquatic birds are plovers, great reed warblers, black-headed gulls and the hobby. There is in addition one of the more important predators of waterfowl, the marsh harrier, more common on the permanent lakes where there is denser vegetation.

Beyond the wetlands are various other wild animals such as rodents, hares, pole cats, snakes, falcons, owls and partridges.

== Demographics ==
Pedro Muñoz had a population of 8,711 inhabitants in 2009, declining slightly to 8,639 inhabitants according to the 2011 census. Its population density is 78.04 inhabitants per km^{2}.

== History ==
=== Archaeological discoveries ===
Facing La Vega Lake, on a small promontory of marl clay, remnants of successive reconstructions of the Iberian type of adobe buildings were discovered. A subsidence area was found when the land was cleared, with approximately five feet of deposits similar to ancient clay pots. There were large animal teeth, and the skeleton of an animal that appeared to be a carnivore was found in one of the containers. There were also stones joined with mud, forming Cyclopean walls. It appeared to be a Carpetani settlement, Celtic people living among Oretani, the Celtiberians, the Vaccaei and the Vettones.

Archaeological excavations carried out at Cerro de La Nieve (Hill of the Snow), between 1984 and 1990, threw further light on the first inhabitants of Pedro Muñoz. In successive interventions made at the site numerous archaeological remains have been found, including: bone sculpture; small-scale metallurgy, possibly manufactured in a local copper foundry; handmade ceramics painted in a tradition of the Urnfield culture; bronze fibulae (ornamental pins), utensils and other brassware; Greek pottery (associated with fruit trade); and numerous Iberian cemeteries as well as a Roman and many medieval cemeteries. The settlement was probably part of a system of towns of Iberian contemporaries at the time, Las Mesas, Cuenca and Campo de Criptana, Ciudad Real being the closest neighbors.

=== Pre-Roman and ancient history ===
In pre-Roman times, the area had a population of about 100 people in the Cerro de La Nieve area. Several samples of Iberian sculptures have been found in this area. Founded in the late 6th or early 5th century BC, it was a semi-nomadic village of the early Iron Age with influences from the Urnfield and Iberian cultures. The village was abandoned c. 300 BC, possibly due to pressures from the Carthaginian conquest of the southern peninsula.

This area was later occupied by the Romans. A Roman tomb was found at Cerro de la Nieve and a Roman road and bridge were built to cross the Záncara river, suggesting that the Iberian fort was occupied by Romans. However, it is unknown if there was a village near or around them at that time. The region was conquered in the 4th century AD by the Visigoths.

=== Middle Ages ===
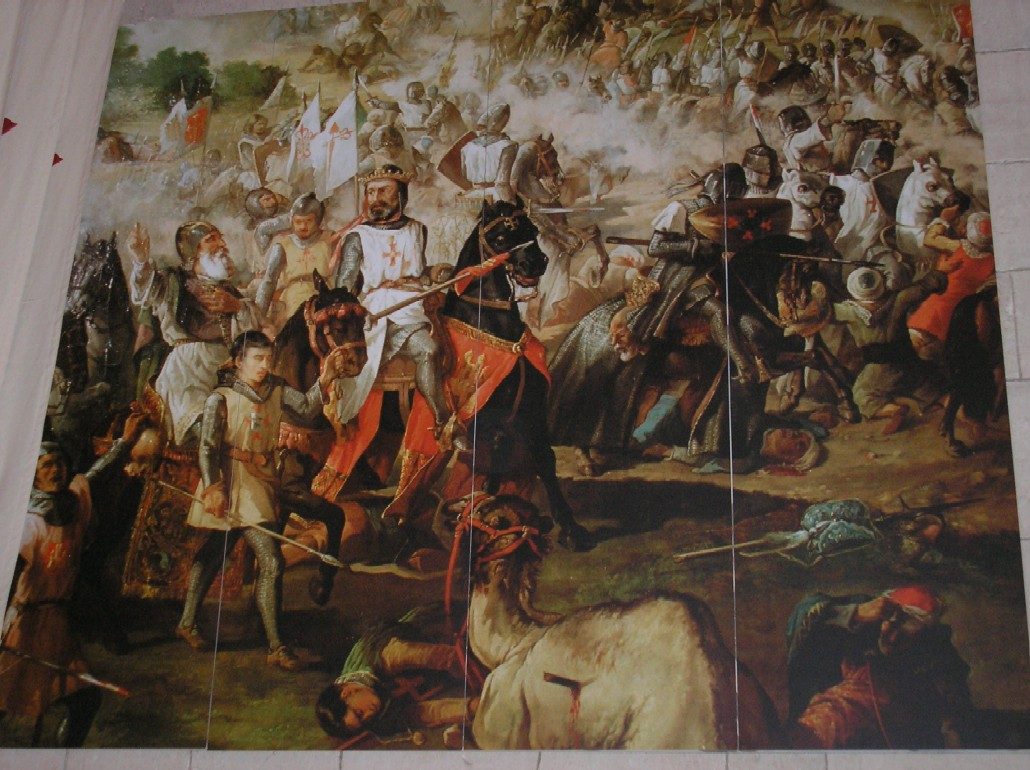
Scenes of the Spanish Reconquest by the Military Order of Santiago

The region was conquered by Iberian Muslims in the 8th century before coming under the Castilians in the 13th century, who then founded the village under the priory of Uclés. The village was founded through the efforts of the Archdeacon of Alcaraz, Pero Muñoz. He was looking to find high, defensible points in the La Mancha plains, close to his headquarters near Alcaraz, that were safe from the raids often carried out by the Muslim armies which caused great havoc among Christians. Alcaraz aimed to populate strategic locations resulting in the village being founded in 1284, the year of the death of King Alfonso X (the Wise) of Castile, whose son Sancho IV succeeded to the throne.

The Archbishop of Toledo had asked permission to create churches throughout this region, expropriating land for this purpose. Realizing that the site was inhabited, he tried to make the villagers abandon the village so that he could to take it. The Archdeacon of Alcaraz (Pero Muñoz) petitioned the Archbishop of Toledo for permission to annex the inhabited land, and the Archdeacon became famous for the complicated lawsuit that ruled in his favour. The Archbishop of Toledo was forced to relinquish his rights to the town and concede it to Alcaraz. For this reason, the villagers honored the Archdeacon by putting his name to the village.

Alfonso XI conceded the village in 1324, and in that same year the village council received a letter of privilege from the Military Order of Santiago.

In 1410, a year of considerable drought in the region, the wetlands receded and divided the town lake into three. This made the land very prone to disease and also attracted pests from the surrounding barren lands. Faced with these plagues, residents were forced to abandon the village.

=== 16th century ===
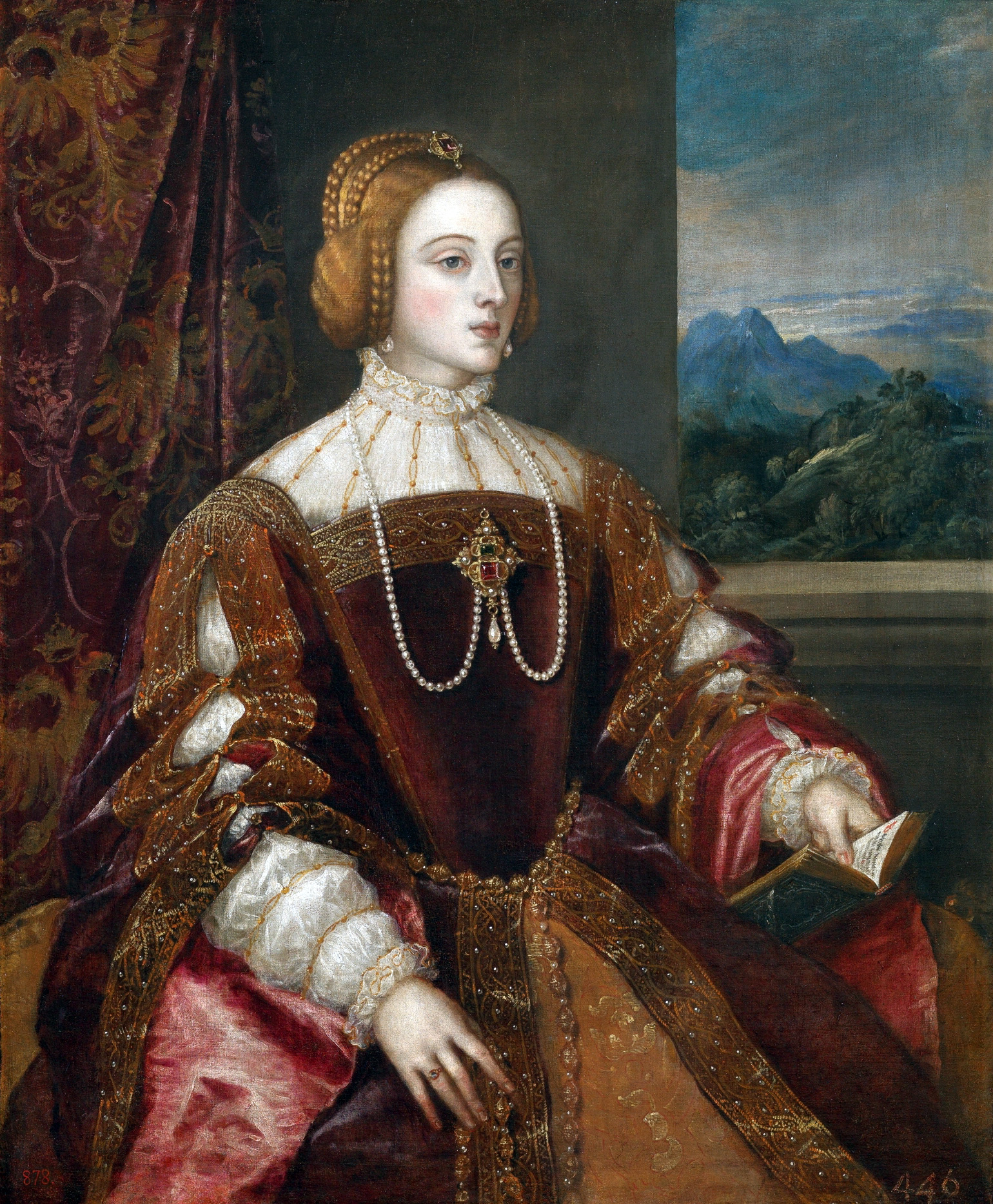
Queen Isabella gave the Privilege Ville to Pedro Muñoz, 10 August 1531.

In 1525 the town was resettled by the Mayordomo family whose patriarch, Juan Mayordomo, had heard about the fertility of its lands – and also had to abandon their old village, Cervera del Llano, Cuenca, due to a confrontation with the Marquis de Villena over taxation. Juan Mayordomo later informed his relatives that it was a suitable and welcoming place and persuaded them to settle and encourage others to join them. Mayordomo's family was responsible for spreading this message and soon other families began to arrive until the town was reborn. Mayordomo became the first mayor of the municipality due to his leadership.

Farmers residing in the neighbouring villages of Socuéllamos, El Toboso, Campo de Criptana and Mota del Cuervo attempted to destroy the houses where the newcomers had settled. They were fearful that they would lose their new borders, forests and meadows they had gained when the village was abandoned in 1410. To avoid this, Mayordomo and other residents took their case to the courts of Ocaña, Toledo, Avila and Madrid, asking for town powers to be granted. However the councils of Socuéllamos, El Toboso, Campo de Criptana and Mota del Cuervo also filed a lawsuit to prevent this concession, vying for favor against Pedro Muñoz. Spain was at that time positioned as one of the major European powers, and Emperor Charles I had to leave Spain to resolve issues in its European territories. In his place, Queen Isabella of Portugal and Aragon granted town privileges to Pedro Muñoz on 10 August 1531, saving the town from future threats against its homes. For this reason there appears in the right lower quarter of the town's heraldic shield a crown in gratitude to the monarchy, specifically Isabel, for her decision to grant township privileges in a difficult time.

=== 17th and 18th centuries ===
In 1691, Pedro Muñoz was included in the province of La Mancha, with Almagro as the capital, having been segregated from the province of Toledo.

In the eighteenth century, a number of large mansions, such as "Paca's House-Palace", were built. In 1700, the construction of the Church of St. Peter the Apostle began.

=== 19th century ===
During the Carlist wars there was an agreement signed in this village between the conflicting parties. Acuerdo Street is named in reference to this agreement, which is also represented by two clasped right hands, under a crossed sword and baton, on a field of the town's shield. This is depicted on the genuine glass shield at the head of the stairs of the City Hall.

=== 20th century ===
With the beginnings of the vineyards and winemaking industry, Pedro Muñoz gained momentum for greater democracy and freedom for its enterprising citizens who created companies to meet the market needs of the people and to provide jobs for its neighbors and those in the region who, in turn, helped to maintain and grow this municipality that is located in the heart of La Mancha.

During the Spanish Civil War (1936 1939) Pedro Muñoz came under the Republican zone and suffered repression from the two opposing sides. In 1940, a plague of locusts devastated cereal crops in Spain, causing starvation among the population. The advent of democracy and, in 1986, the entry of Spain into the European Union encouraged reinvestment and currently there are three industrial estates forming a fundamental basis of the town's economy.

On 12 August 1994, at about 4 pm, a storm of mud and hail caused chaos in the town. It was of such magnitude that several hundred-year old cypress trees in the local cemetery were uprooted and fell on surrounding tombstones. There was a mass panic at the crowded swimming pool (minutes before the temperatures were above 40 °C). Nobody was injured as there was adequate shelter in the locker room.

On 12 August 2007, a magnitude 5.1 earthquake occurred with its epicenter 10 km beneath the municipality of Pedro Muñoz. It could be felt in more than a dozen autonomous communities, though the only notable damage reported was the sinking of a portion of the 19th century Municipal Theater of Almagro, over ninety miles away.

== Monuments and sites of interest ==
=== City Hall ===
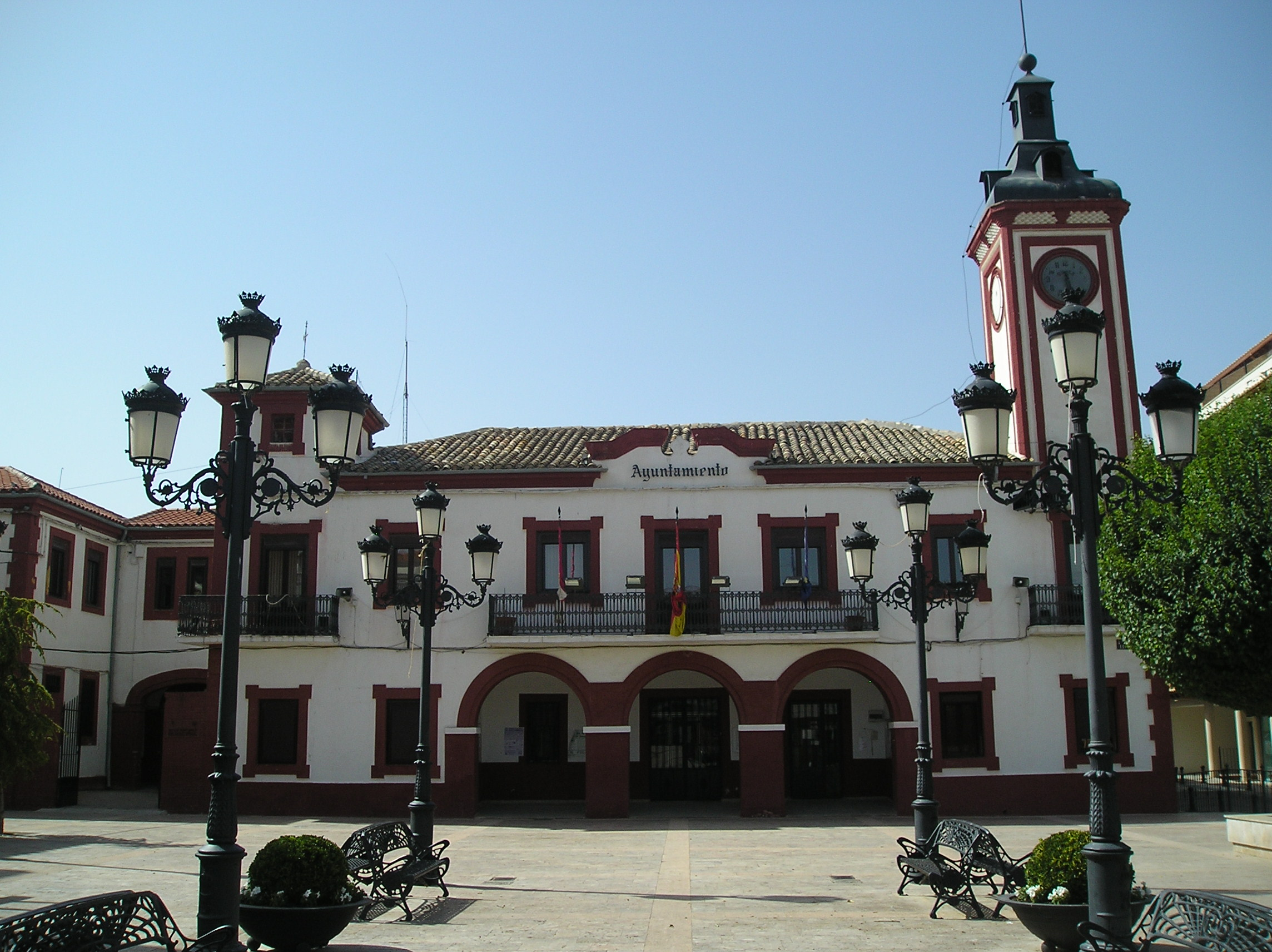
City Hall

The City Hall is located in the Plaza de España (Spain square), at the center of town, and has been remodeled several times to reach its current state. It emphasizes the tower Historicist-style while retaining the sole remnant of the original Old Town Hall, built in the early twentieth century in the neo-Mudejar style (a sixteenth century Spanish architectural style). In 1946 the current building was completed, a slender design capped with a cover dome. Its forms and curves contain eastern elements and it is ornamented with dovecotes and an upper turret.

=== Church of St. Peter the Apostle ===
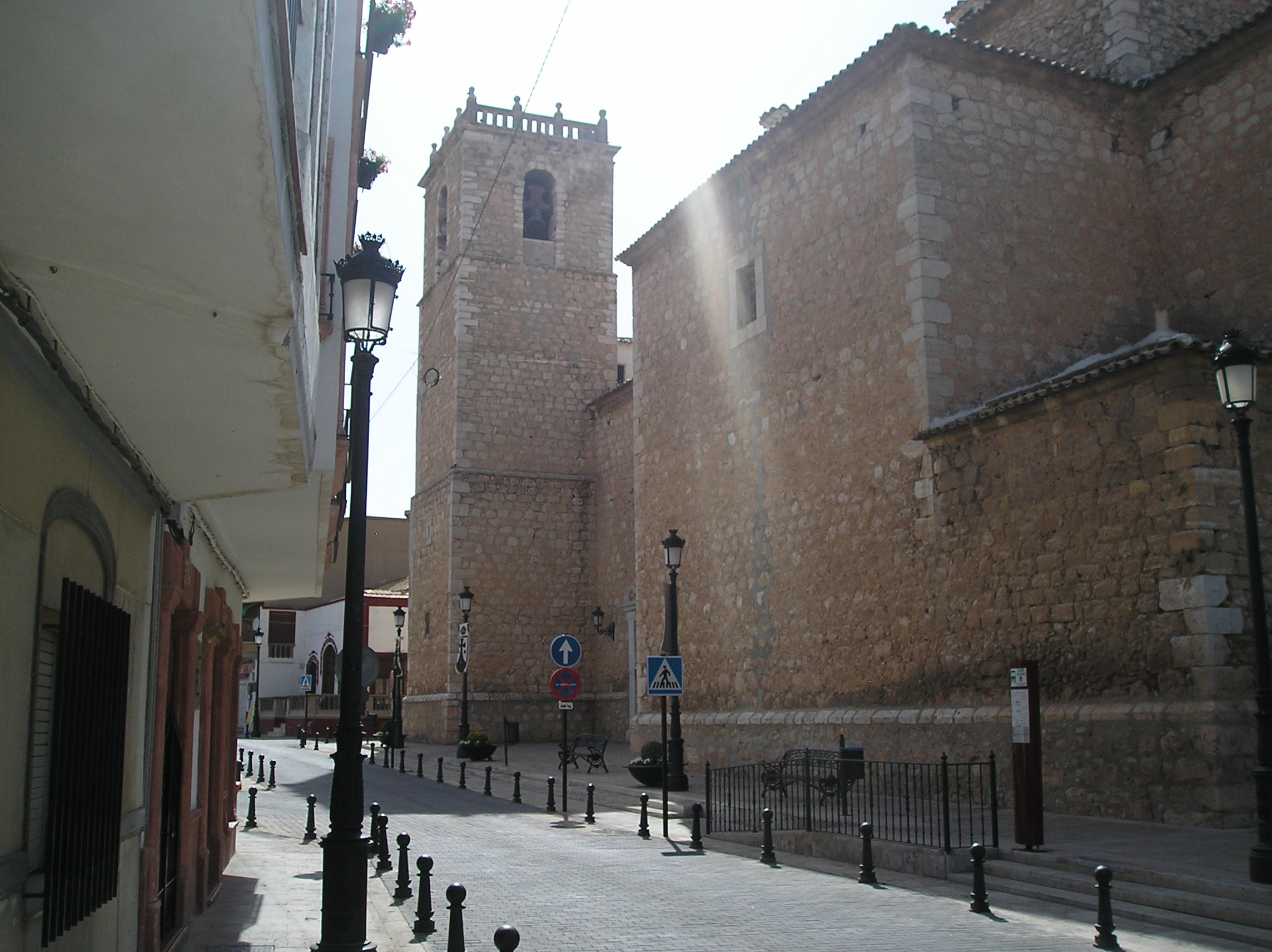
Church of San Pedro Apóstol

As the inhabitants of Pedro Muñoz faced advancing wetlands, they had to abandon the old Church of San Antonio. The Pedroteños (demonym for the residents of Pedro Muñoz) then decided it was necessary to build a new church. On 8 September 1700, the foundation stone for the present church was laid and work was completed in 1722.

The church is the best representation of Pedro Muñoz's architecture as a whole. Located in the Plaza de España, it has a graceful style that blends Renaissance with the Baroque. The floorplan is a Latin cross with shallow townhouses in three corners of the block and a transept nave with a square tower. Rehabilitation work and mounting a bell tower were done to coincide with the celebration of the third centenary of the groundbreaking, and these upgrades have contributed to enhancing the church's beauty.

=== Chapel of the Madonna of Los Angeles ===
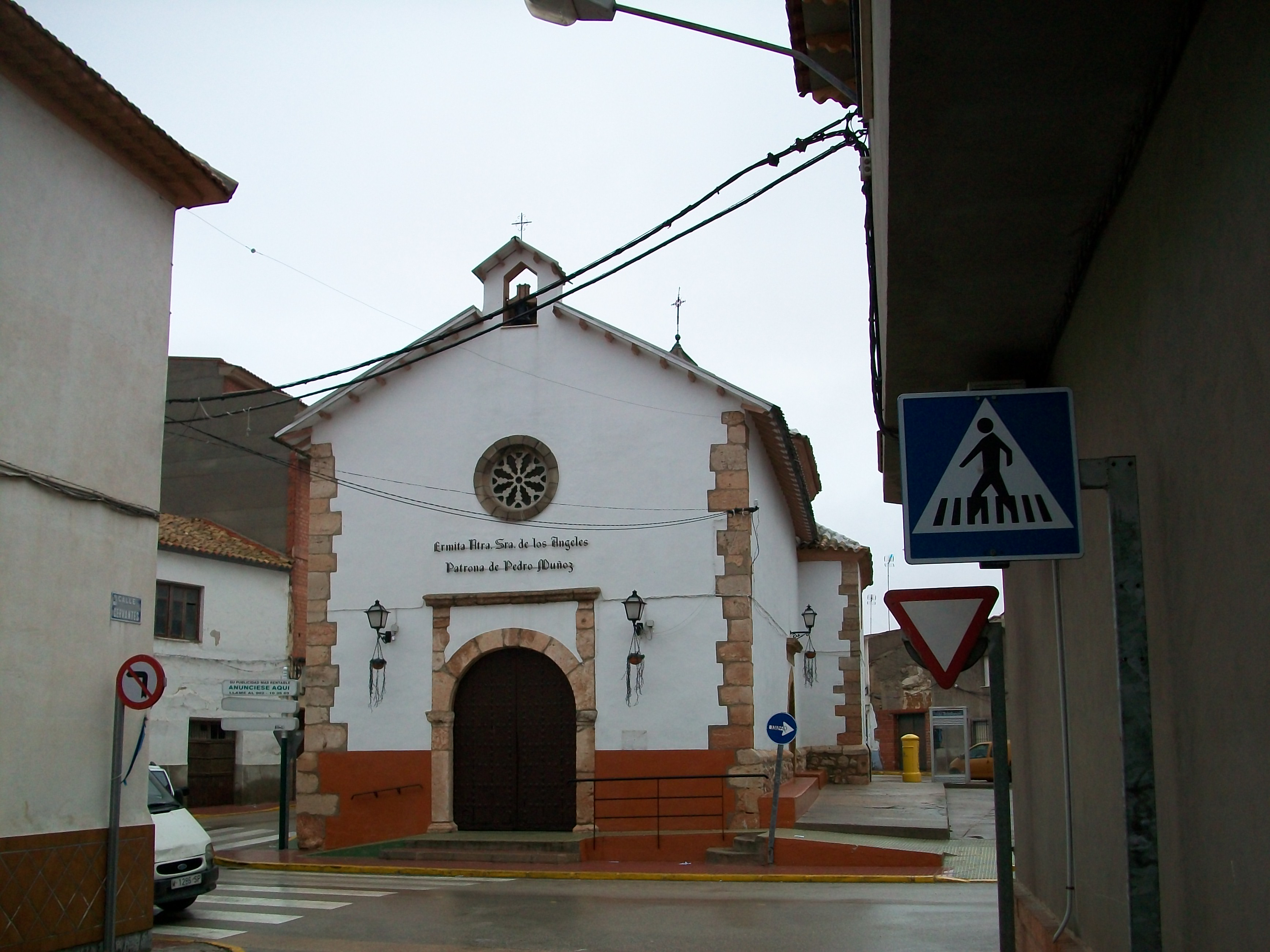
Chapel of the Madonna of Los Angeles.

The hermitage of Our Lady of The Angels is on calle de la Virgen (Virgin Street) at the convergence of Avenida de Concordia (Concord Avenue), la calle Prim (Prim Street) and la calle Cervantes (Cervantes Street). The name of Our Lady of the Angels was probably devoted to the holy virgin and at the same time to the only daughter of the town's refounder, Juan Mayordomo. His daughter was born a short time after he resettled in the town and died a few years after her birth. When the construction of the new houses were begun in the second repopulation on Tahona Hill and in la calle del Campo (Country street) they began the construction of the Santa Ana hermitage and the hermitage of Our Lady of the Angels. It seems the latter was built over a construction that had been there previously, a rustic hermitage on a foundation of rock and soil.

In 1769 work began on the new chapel, though it was suspended and did not resume until 1771. It was completed eight years later, with extensive arcades and seating throughout. The building was largely destroyed in the Civil War and was not rebuilt until the war ended.

=== Manor houses ===
==== Casa de la Paca ====
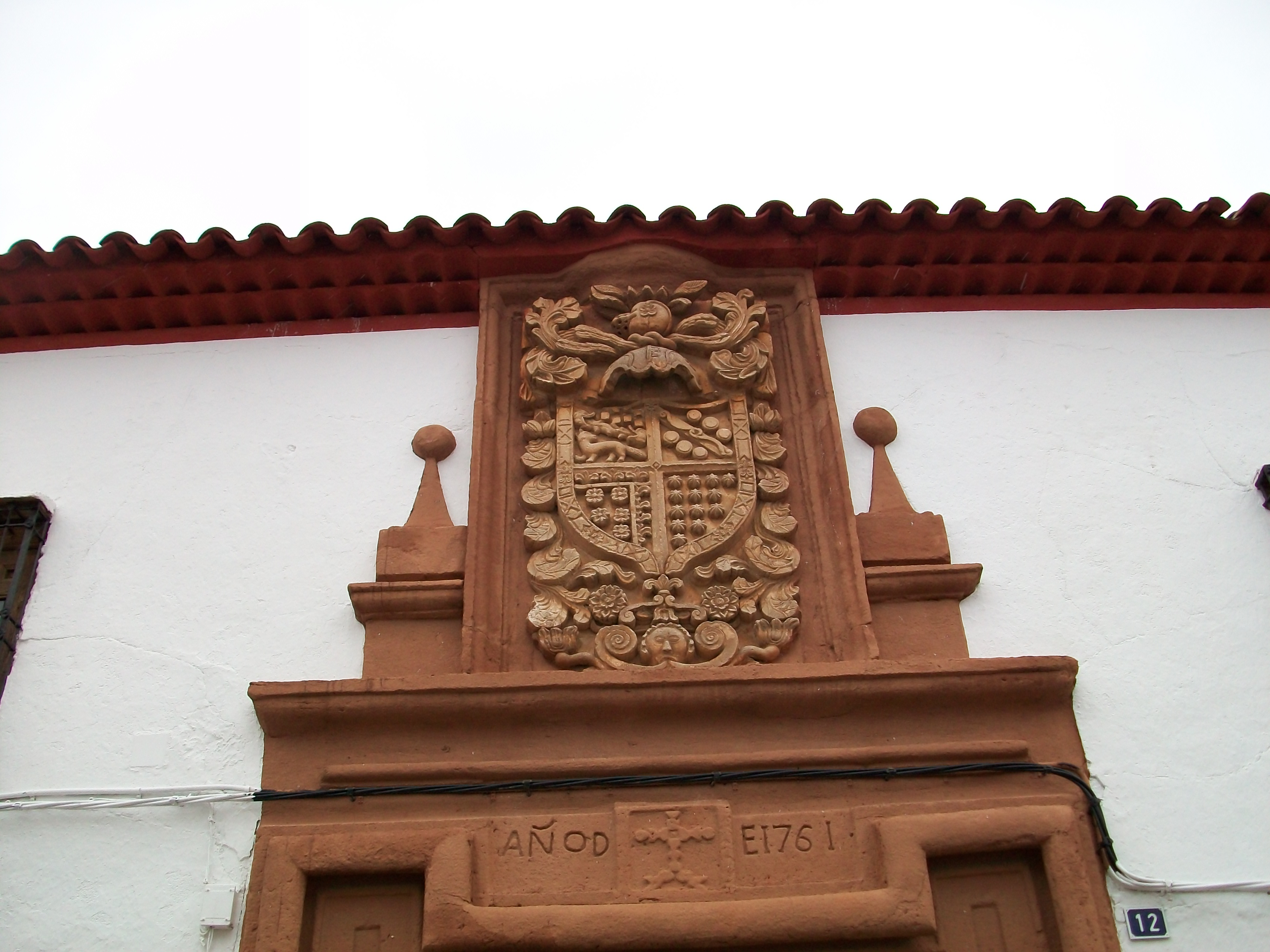
Paca's House-Palace

The Paca House or Menault House at 12 Tahoma Street is a mansion built in 1760 in the baroque style with a heraldic decoration on the facade and windows with iron railings. The heraldic decoration on the facade is above the main door, in a reddish sandstone which contrasts with the white wall (pictured). Inside the main door is an entrance porch and a security door. The bright inner courtyard has a rustic balustrade and gives access to the rooms. It was first called Casa de la Paca from the name of an early owner, Francisca Ramírez Cañas, called "Paca", who donated the house to the church upon her death. From that time the house has been used for catechesis and other church-related activities.

==== Casa Granero ====
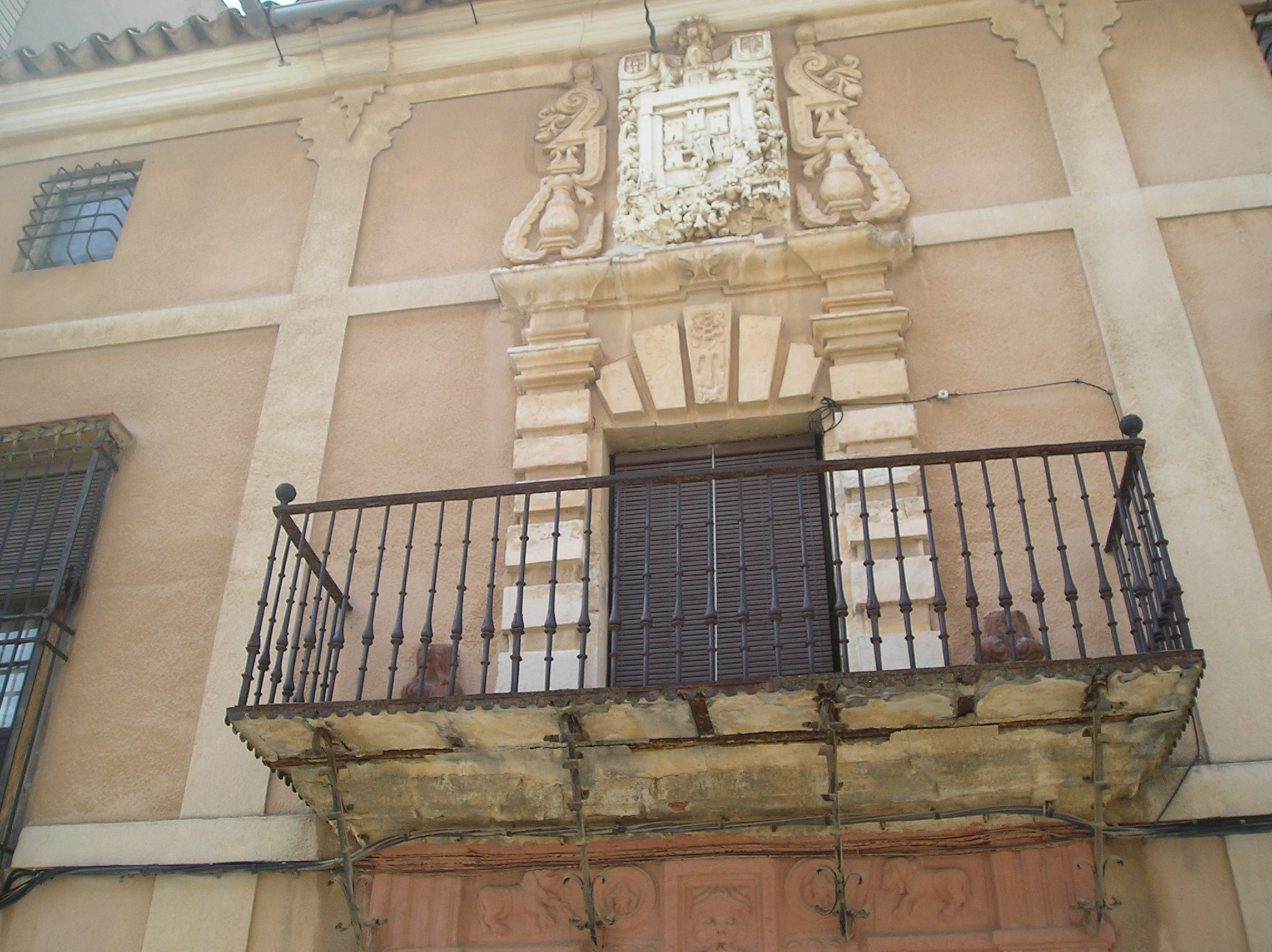
Graneros' House-Palace

Casa Granero is in Carlos Garzarán Street, a mansion built by the Granero de Heredia family. It was constructed in the late 18th century by Don Juan José Granero de Heredia y Quiros Garcés de Marcilla. Above the central balcony is the family heraldic shield which carries just one field of red with five silver castles and a rampant lion of gold in the centre. It doesn't carry a crest but if so, an armed warrior with a sword and the cross of Santiago on his chest, a baroque border and a cartouche of eight bundles of arrows, the symbol of Fernando el Católico.

==== Fernandez Cuellar's House ====
Fernandez Cuéllar's House is in Tahons Street, it is a mansion of the 18th century with a heraldic decoration on the façade. Work has been carried out to renovate the façade and the interior, even so, it has kept its original shape except for the overhang of the roof where the shield is placed. Originally it was at a right angle and now it is diagonal to the architrave. Of the founder little is known, it is thought that he belonged to the Fernández Cuellar family, the name existed in that area but later disappeared.
The shield is of one field which holds a single pine tree and a wolf lifted off its feet, symbolizing a city governor who after a long siege attacks the besiegers and returns victorious with a huge booty. The patio is characteristically Castellano, the main door is made of rustic wood with decorative ironwork.

==== Casa del Prior ====
The Prior's House is on the corner of Campo Street and Pizarro Street. It is decorated with the shield of the Order of Calatrava, preserved as it was. It appears that c. 1698 a senior ecclesiastical official or a prior resided there. It is known that a group of monks of the Cistercian order lived there during the time of the parish church's construction in the early 18th century. These monks wanted to found a monastery here that would be a dependent of the Monastery of San Clodio in Leiro, (Ourense) which was commissioned by the Pedroteňo (native of Pedro Muňoz) Blas Garcia. It not known who built the house or when.

==== Casa de la Torrecilla ====
The Turret House is situated at 18 Virgen Street and was constructed in the 18th century. It is a manor house with a simple heraldic device on the façade founded by an unknown knight of the Order of Santiago. Above one of the windows (where previously there was a door), visible under the paintwork, is a shield with the cross of the Order of Santiago.

==== La casa de la calle Dos de Mayo ====
In the calle Dos de Mayo (2 May Street) there was another decorated house, again the founder is unknown. It showed a shield with the cross of the Military Order of St John, now the Order of Malta. The house had a typical castellano patio but it was demolished to build another house.

=== Plaza de toros ===
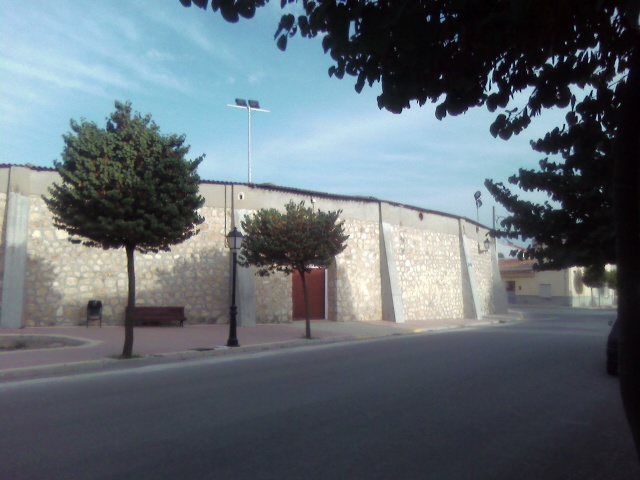
Bullring

The bullring (constructed 1916—1919) was inaugurated in the town fair of 1919 with two bullfights. In the first the bullfighters Rafael Rubio "Rodalito", Corralfuente and Antonio Sanchez participated. In the second it was Corralfuente and "Rodalito". The builders of this structure used the diameter of the bullring of Quintanar de la Orden as a guide.

During the Spanish Civil War the bullring was converted into a makeshift firing range and was seriously damaged. Afterwards, in 1945, local residents purchased and restored the bullring, and on 1 August 1964 it was ceded to the local council with certain conditions.

=== Roman bridge ===
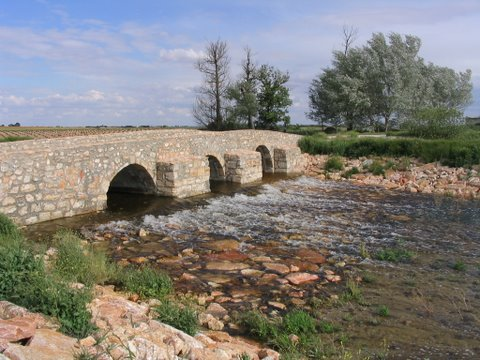
Roman bridge in the Záncara river

A Roman bridge, known as the Molino de la Torre bridge (Mill Tower Bridge) (39°20′23.85″N 2°54′6.74″W), carries the Serranos Way across the Záncara River at the edge of the municipal boundary with Socuéllamos. It is a stonework construction with three arches of equal size and a smaller blind arch. The Serranos Way has the remains of a Roman road of some 6 metres width which once linked Complutum (now Alcala de Henares) with Cartagonova (now Cartagena). The Roman road has become progressively destroyed by the cultivation of crops.

=== San Miguel Bridge ===
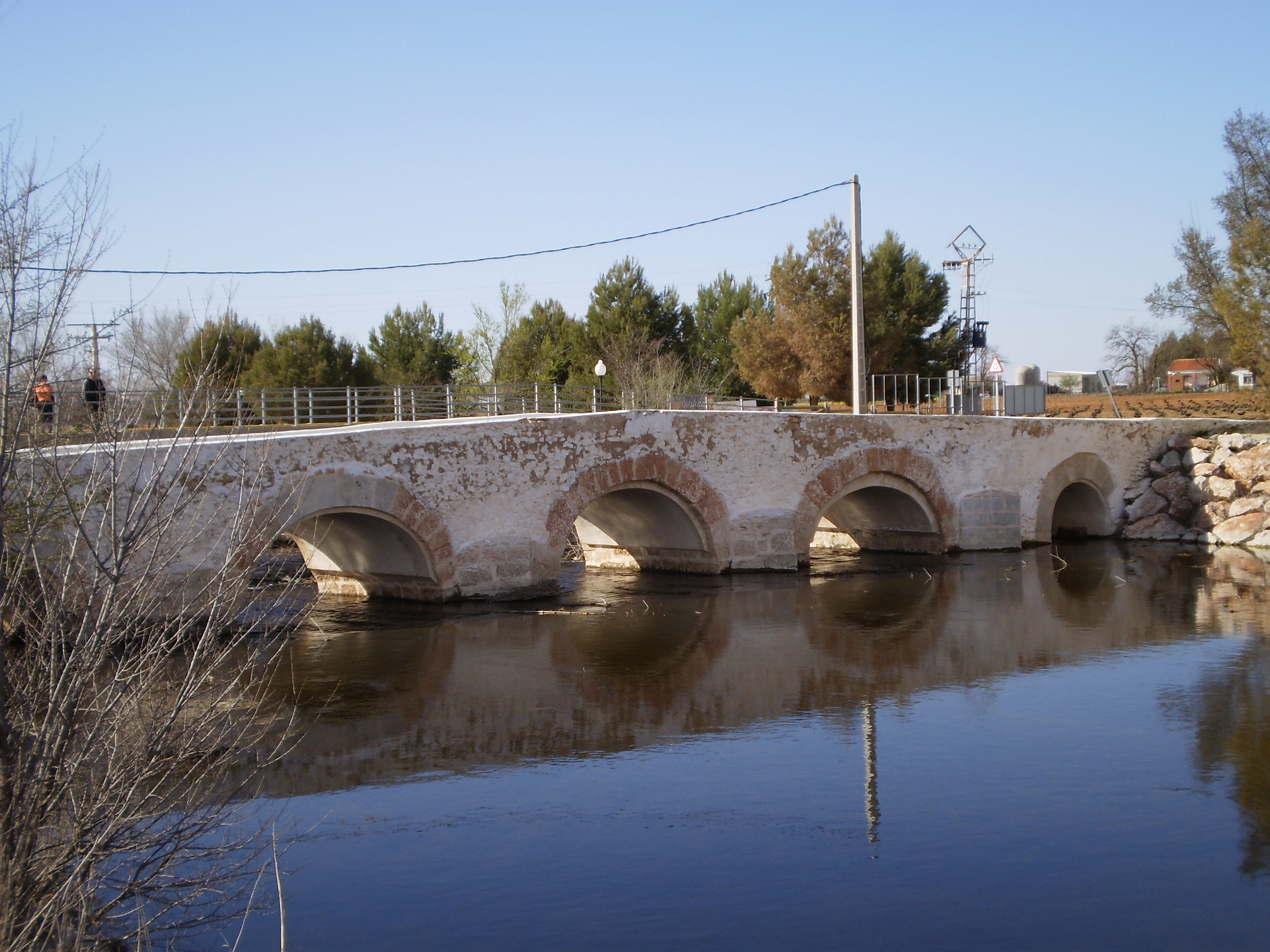
San Miguel bridge

St Michael's Bridge (39°20′58″N 2°55′50″W) is similar to the Roman bridge, crossing the Záncara River next to the hermitage of San Miguel. Recently there has been work to restore the bridge and improve the surroundings with greenways on both banks of the river.

In the Middle Ages and for some time afterwards shepherds were taxed when crossing the bridge, two head of sheep per shepherd crossing.

== Culture ==
=== El Harinera ===
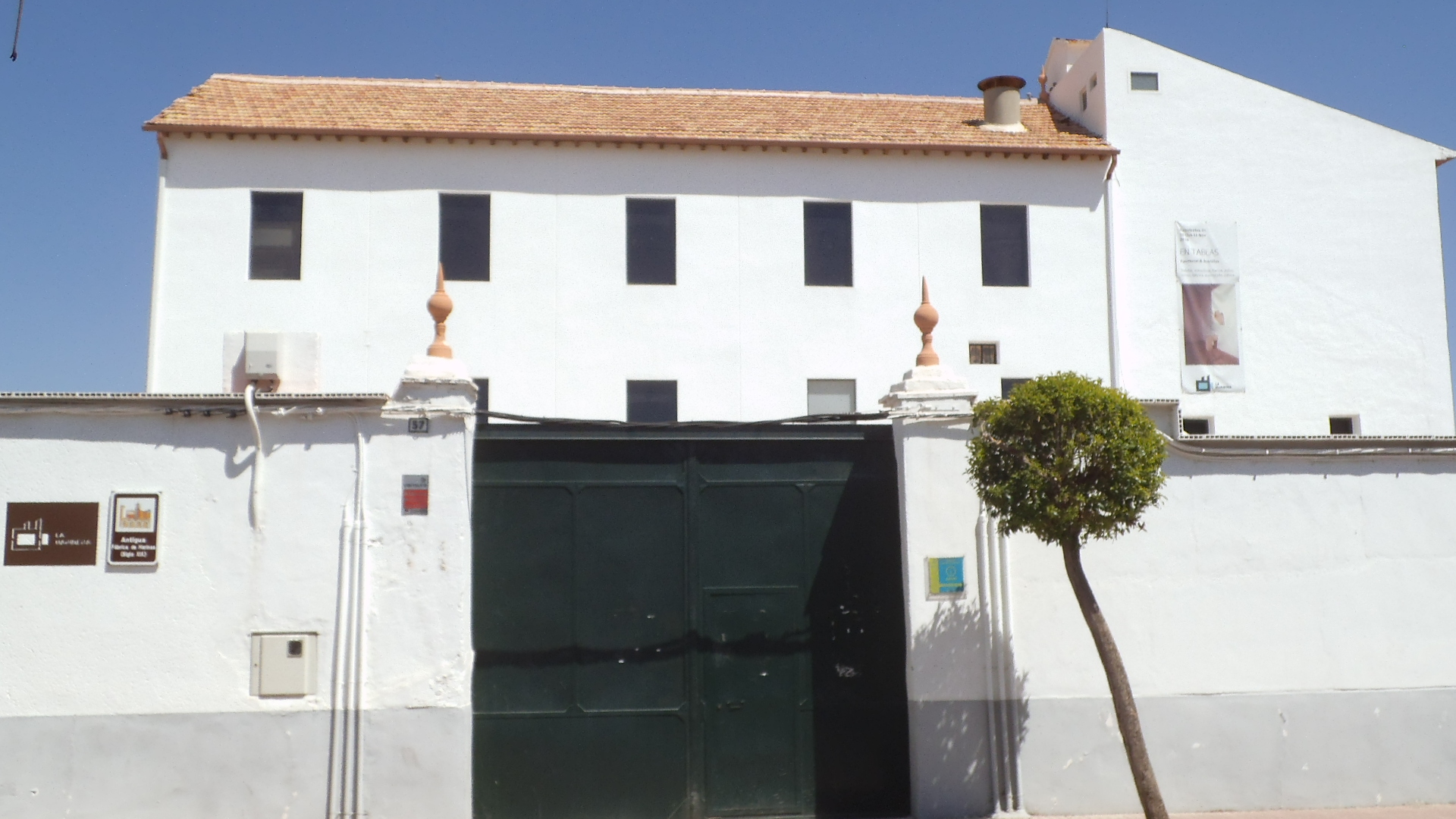
La Harinera cultural center.

La Harinera (The flour factory) is a cultural project promoted by the Iberian American Foundation of Cultural and Creative Industries (FIBICC) and opened as a museum in 2015. It is an organization that focuses on cultural development where there is accommodation to artists to develop their work. It also has a hostel where students from around the world can live during their Spanish courses.

== Notable people ==
=== Historic ===
- Juan Mayordomo, re-founded the village in 1525
- Manuel Gallardo (1642 – 1718), chaplain of the Spanish Army, preacher of the king and commissioner of Jerusalem from the former Spanish provinces of Sicily
- Francisco Castillo (1664 – 1714), a master in philosophy and theology, rector of the Colegio Santo Tomás de Alcalá and grader of the Spanish Inquisition
- Felipe Sanz (1683 – 1770), a Dominican friar, rector of the Colegio de Santo Tomás de Alcalá and prior of the Convents of Toledo and Cuenca

=== Contemporary ===
- Jesús Julián Lucendo, former FC Barcelona player and the Andorra National Football Team (double nationality)
- José Luis Laguía, retired cyclist
- Juande Ramos, football manager

== Bibliography ==
- Pedro Muñoz... Una Historia. Miguel Francisco Franco. 1984. ISBN 84-505-0455-4
- Una banda, un pueblo y 120 años de historia. Historia de la Banda Municipal de Música. Juan Antonio Rejano. 2000
