= Abia de la Obispalía Castle =

Coordinates: 40.0176°N 2.3969°W

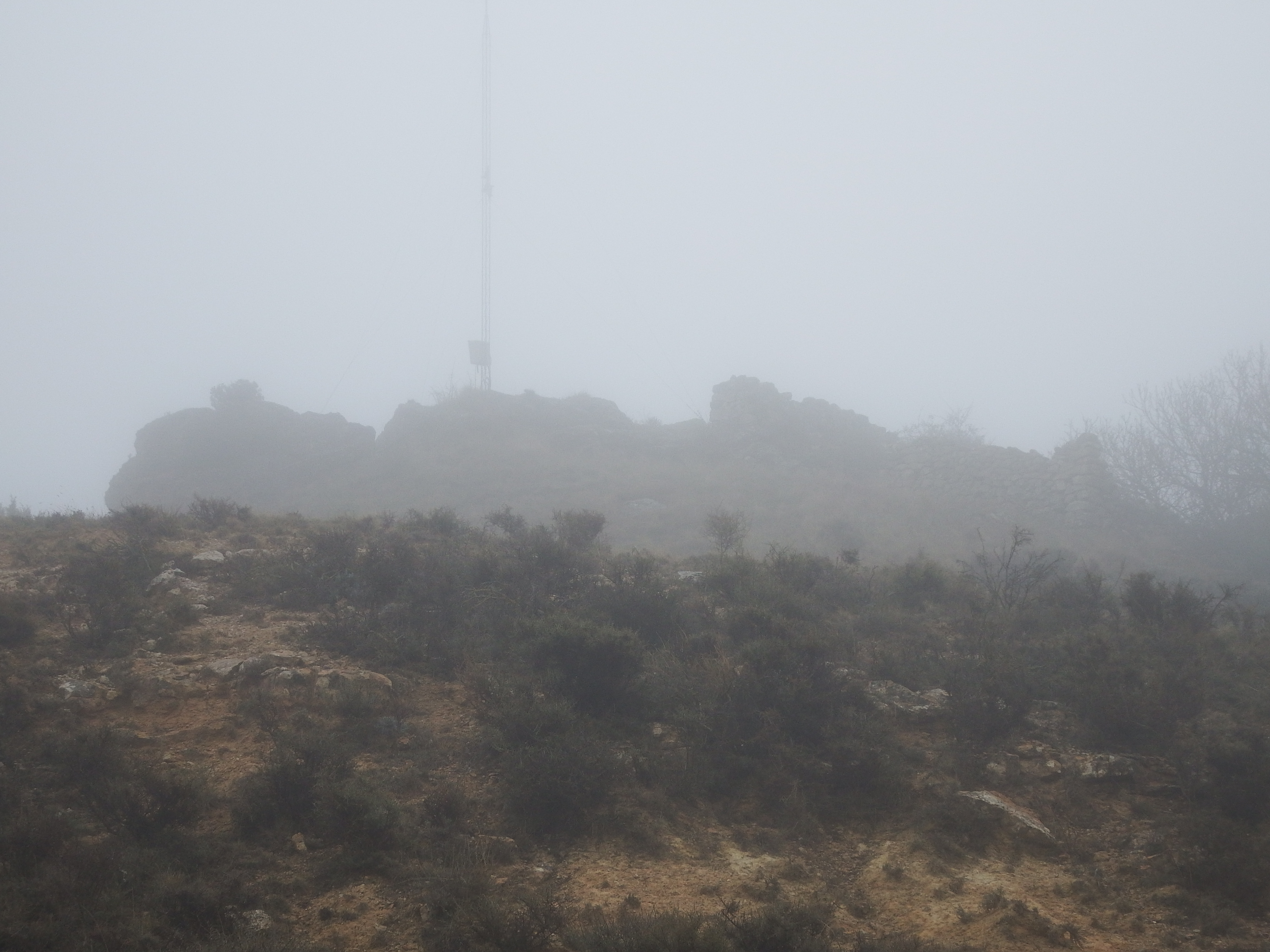
Abia de la Obispalía

The castle of Abia de la Obispalía is a monument of Roman origin, located in Abia de la Obispalía, in the province of Cuenca, close to a cemetery and an old church.

== History ==
The castle is of Roman origin; it was important during the Middle Ages.

== Current situation ==
The castle is open to tourism although most of it has been destroyed.

== Surroundings ==
The village of Abia de la Obispalía is very important historically. Several archaeological sites and treasures have been found. One of them is at the Museum of Cuenca, and the other two can be found at the British Museum and the Musées Royaux d'Art et d'Histoire in Brussels.
