= La Harinera =

Coordinates: 39.3991°N 2.9431°W

La Harinera's logo.

La Harinera is a museum and cultural center in Pedro Muñoz, Castile-La Mancha, Spain. The center offers residency programs for artists, as well as courses to help them develop their work.

== History and purpose ==
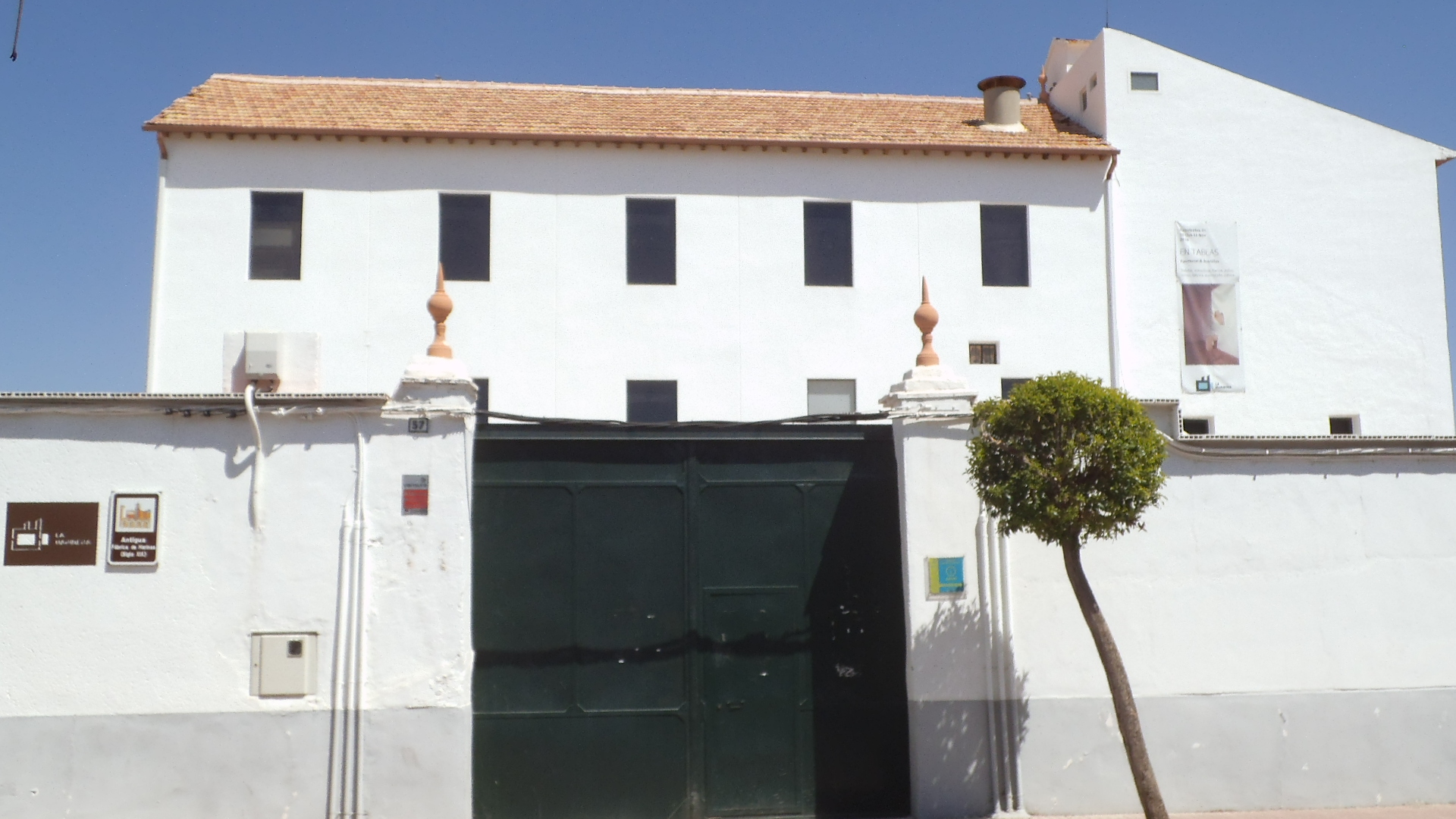
La Harinera cultural center.

The center was founded by the Ibero-American Foundation for the Cultural and Creative Industries (FIBICC). The building, restored in 2014, was originally an old flour mill and bread factory, which had been in operation from the early twentieth century to the 1980s.

The center is aimed at promoting cultural diffusion, by offering courses and providing residence to artists of various kinds. Artists are supported in publicizing their work through exhibitions organized by the center; it also hosts musical events where singers and bands perform in alternative music concerts. It also owns a youth hostel to facilitate cultural exchange and to accommodate Spanish language students who come from around the world to attend the center's courses.

== Creative Program ==
The most prominent program offered by La Harinera is the "Creative Program", which is a residency program that is offered through an artistic scholarship. The program is open to any international artist. During their residency, the artists have to offer workshops sharing their techniques with the public as well as the meaning of their work. In return, the program allows them to make their work known by displaying it publicly on completion of their residency.

== See also ==
- Cultural centers in Spain
- Pedro Muñoz city topics
