= Villarta de San Juan =

- Municipality
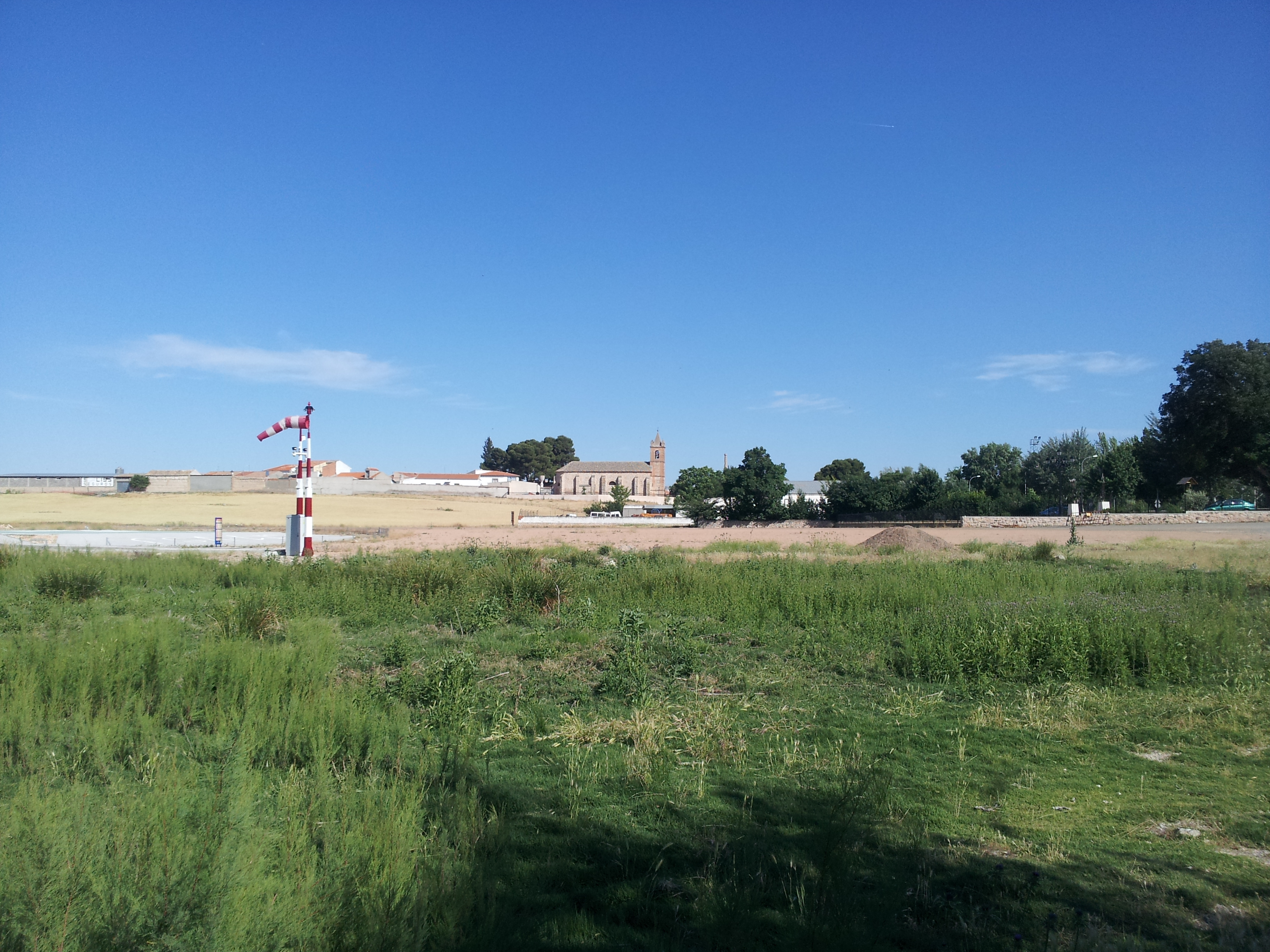
- View of Villarta de San Juan

- Coat of arms

- Location within Castilla-La Mancha Location within Spain
- Coordinates: 39°14′N 3°25′W
- Country: Spain
- Autonomous community: Castilla–La Mancha
- Province: Ciudad Real

Area
  - Total: 66.00 km^{2} (25.48 sq mi)
- Elevation: 626 m (2,054 ft)

Population (2025-01-01)
  - Total: 2,681
  - Density: 40.62/km^{2} (105.2/sq mi)
- Demonym(s): Villartero, Villartera
- Time zone: UTC+1 (CET)
  - Summer (DST): UTC+2 (CEST)
- Postal code: 13210

Villarta de San Juan is a municipality of Spain belonging to the province of Ciudad Real, in the autonomous community of Castilla–La Mancha.

Housing lies on the left (southern) bank of the Cigüela. It stands on the A-4 route.

Villarta was seemingly settled by the Hospitallers in 1236, perhaps dependant on nearby Arenas de San Juan.

The municipality has a total area of 66.00 km^{2} and, as of 1 January 2022, it has a registered population of 2,713.

== Notable people ==
- Tomás Pina (born 1987), professional footballer
