= Záncara =

River in Spain

Coordinates: 39°24′N 2°57′W

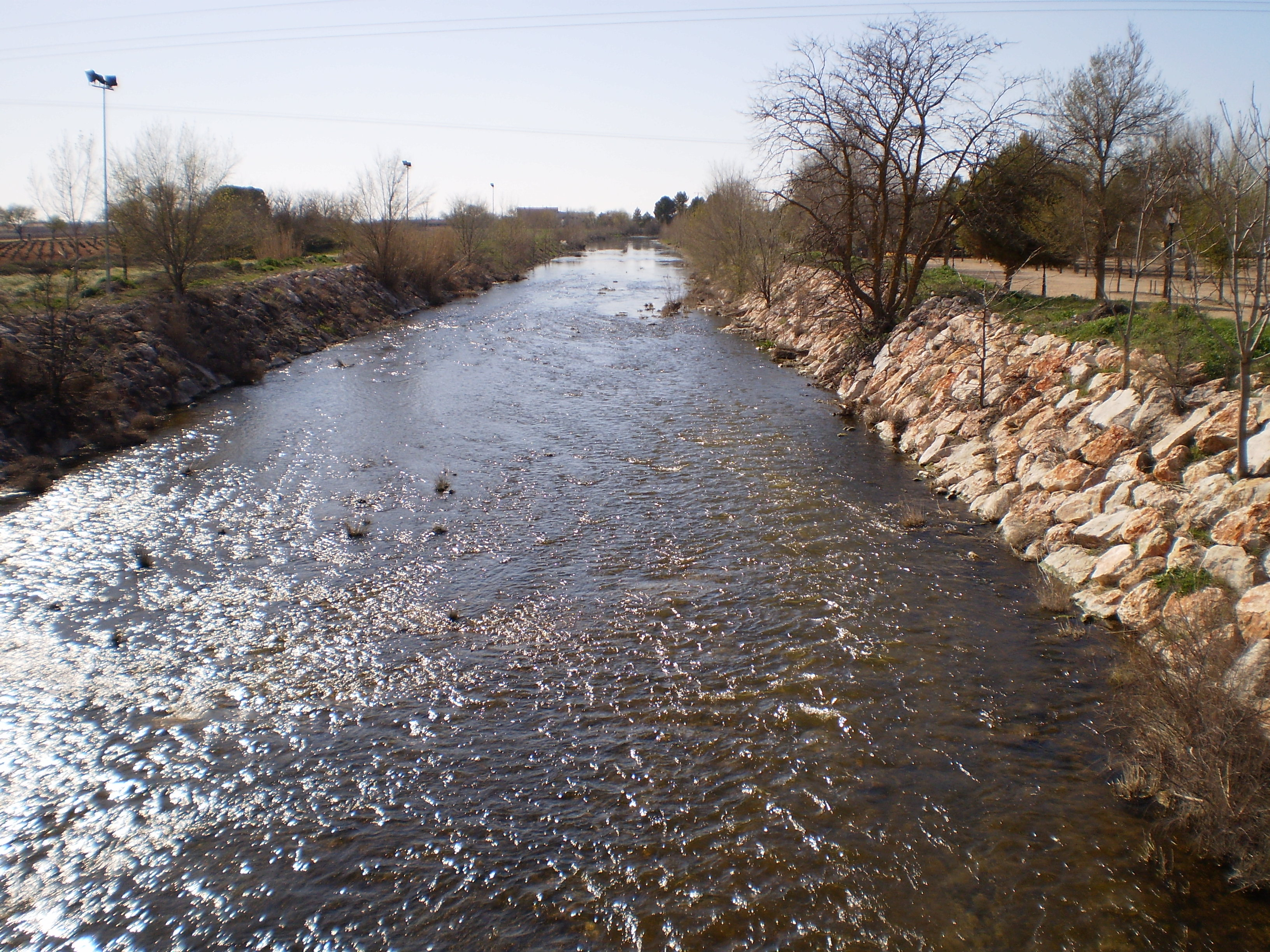
- The Záncara near Pedro Muñoz

Location
- Country: Spain

Physical characteristics
- Source
  - location: Abia de la Obispalía, Cuenca Province (Castile-La Mancha)
  - elevation: 1,020 m (3,350 ft)
- Mouth
  - location: Cigüela
  - elevation: 630 m (2,070 ft)
- Length: 168 km (104 mi)
- Basin size: 5,726 km^{2} (2,211 sq mi)
- Discharge
  - average: 1.93 m^{3}/s (68 cu ft/s)

Basin features
- Progression: Cigüela→ Guadiana→ Gulf of Cádiz

The Záncara is a 168 km long river in Castile-La Mancha, Spain. It is a tributary to the Guadiana. Its source is near the village Abia de la Obispalía, west of Cuenca, in the Iberian System. The Záncara flows southwest, along the town of Socuéllamos. Its main tributaries are the Rus, Saona and Córcoles.

It flows into the Cigüela from the left near the Ojos del Guadiana, Villarrubia de los Ojos municipal term. There are authors though that claim that it is the Cigüela that flows into the Záncara.

== See also ==
- List of rivers of Spain
