= Abia de la Obispalía =

- Municipality
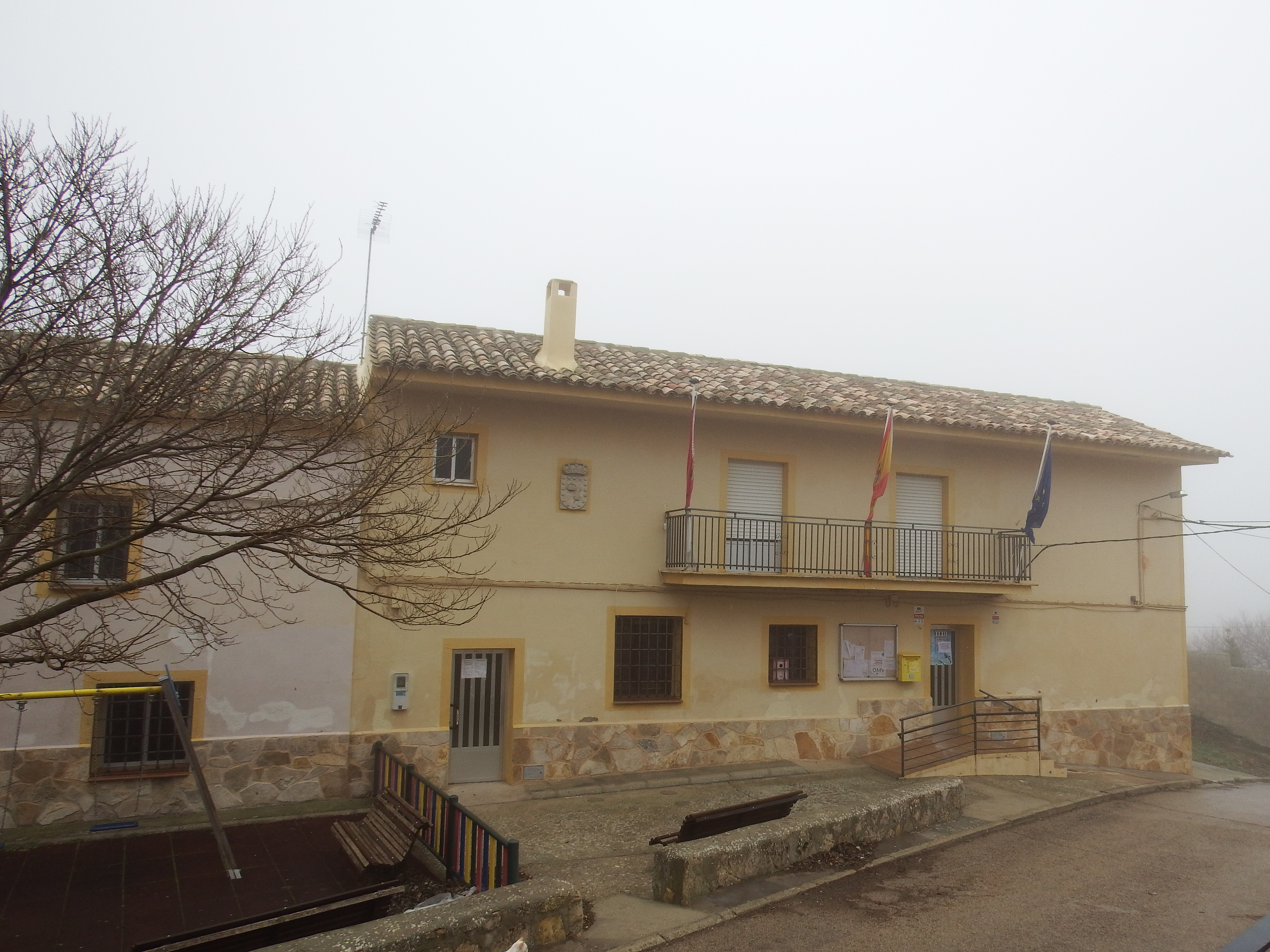

- Flag Coat of arms

- Location within Spain Location within Castilla-La Mancha
- Coordinates: 40°01′07″N 2°23′43″W
- Country: Spain
- Autonomous community: Castile-La Mancha
- Province: Cuenca

Population (2025-01-01)
  - Total: 68
- Time zone: UTC+1 (CET)
  - Summer (DST): UTC+2 (CEST)

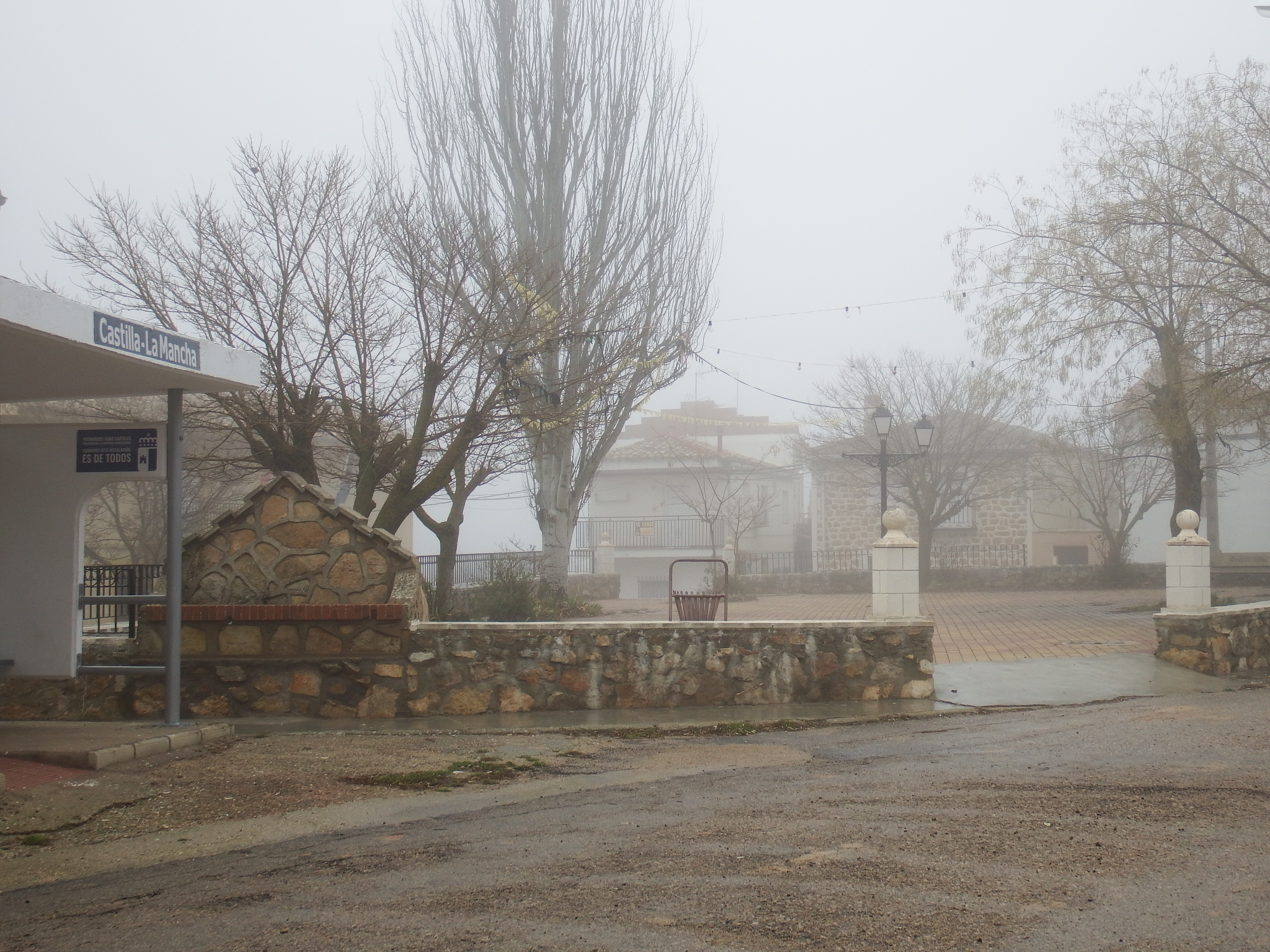

Abia de la Obispalía is a municipality in Cuenca, Castile-La Mancha, Spain. It has a population of 61 as of 2020.

A prestigious late Bronze Age hoard of gold jewellery was found in a cave near the village in the early twentieth century. Known as the Abia de la Obispalia Hoard, it is now in the British Museum's collection.

== Tourism ==
- Abia de la Obispalía Castle, of Roman origin
