= Amarguillo =

River in Castilla–La Mancha, Spain

Amarguillo Arroyo de Valdespino
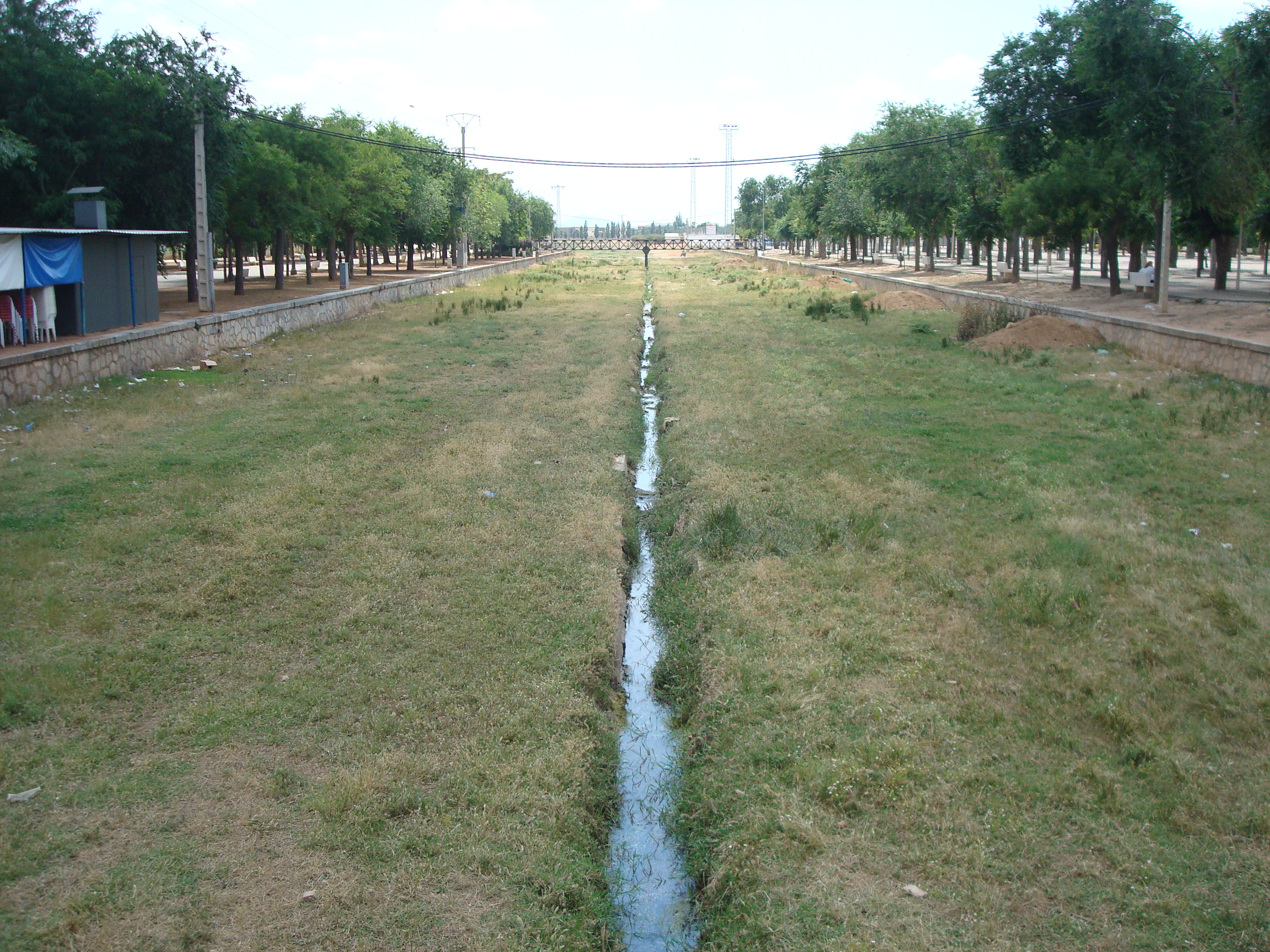
- View of the Amarguillo

Location
- Country: Spain

Physical characteristics
- Source: Collado de la Mirla, Sierra de la Calderina
  - location: Urda, Spain
  - coordinates: 39°19′55″N 3°45′43″W
- Mouth: Cigüela
  - location: Alcázar de San Juan, Spain
  - coordinates: 39°18′11″N 3°21′14″W
- Length: 55 km (34 mi)
- Basin size: 563 km^{2} (217 sq mi)

Basin features
- Progression: Cigüela→ Guadiana→ Atlantic Ocean

The Amarguillo is a river in the centre of the Iberian Peninsula and a tributary of the Cigüela. It belongs to the Guadiana river basin. In modern times, it is dry during most of the year.

== Description ==
The watercourse originates to the north of the Collado de la Mirla (in the Sierra de la Calderina, a subrange of the Montes de Toledo) within the Spanish municipality of Urda. Featuring a catchment area of around 563 km^{2}, the river runs for 55 kilometers mostly in a west-east direction near the fringes of the Montes de Toledo. Historically, the river has been the site of multiple catastrophic floods, including the 1891 one, in which the river reached an estimated flow by Consuegra of 114 m^{3}/s. It passes near the Spanish municipalities of Urda, Consuegra, Madridejos, and Camuñas. Also known as arroyo de Valdespino in its lower course, it discharges into the Cigüela in the province of Ciudad Real.
