= Lezuza =

Coordinates: 38°57′N 2°21′W

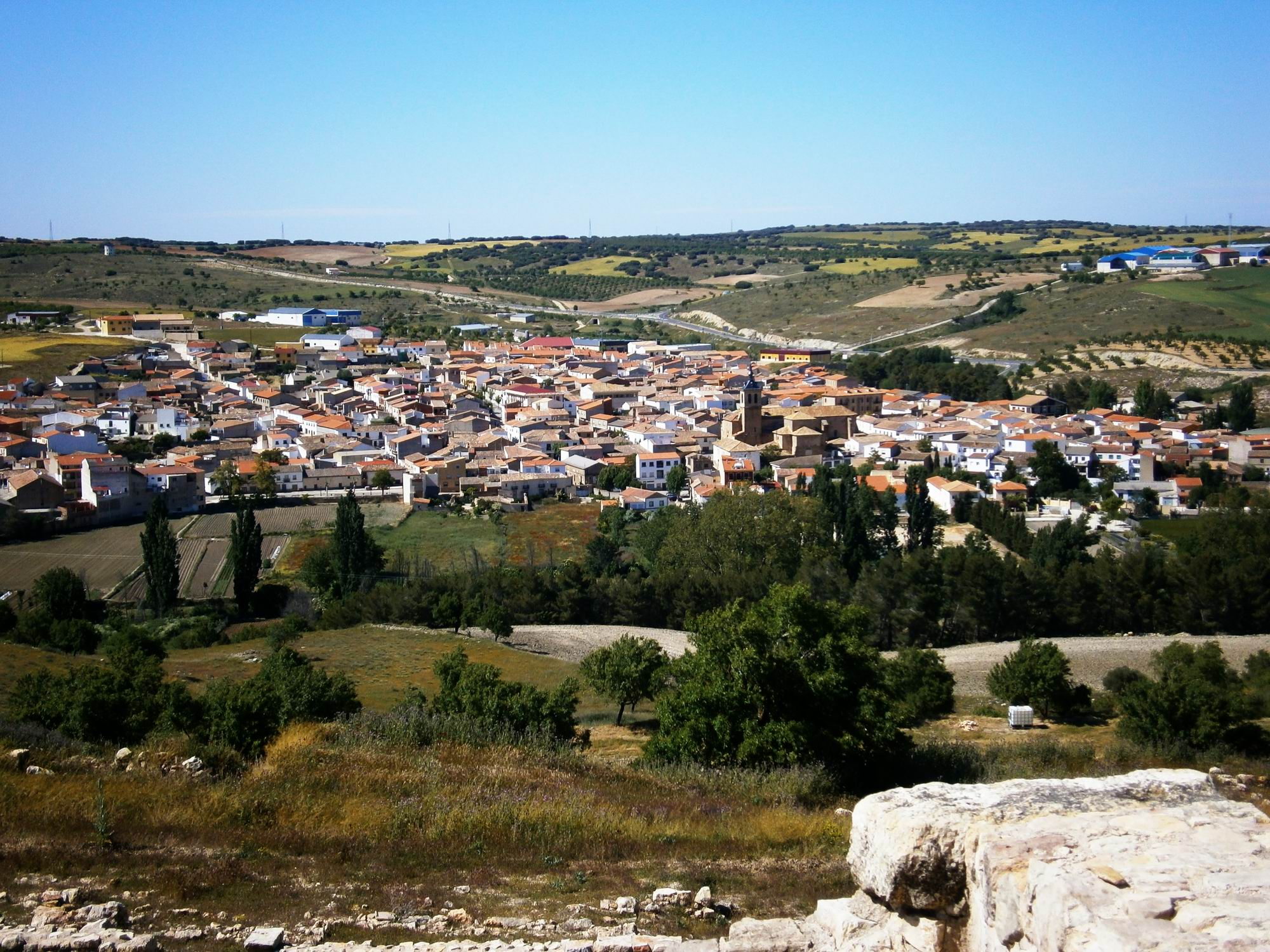

Coat of arms of Lezuza

Lezuza is a municipality in the province of Albacete, Castile-La Mancha, Spain. The name of the municipality comes from the Iberian and later Roman municipality of Libisosa. As of 2023, it has a population of 1,291. The municipality contains the town of Lezuza, as well as the villages Tiriez, La Yunquera, Vandelaras de Arriba, and Vandelaras de Abajo.
