= Cigüela =

River in Spain

Coordinates: 39°14′N 3°25′W

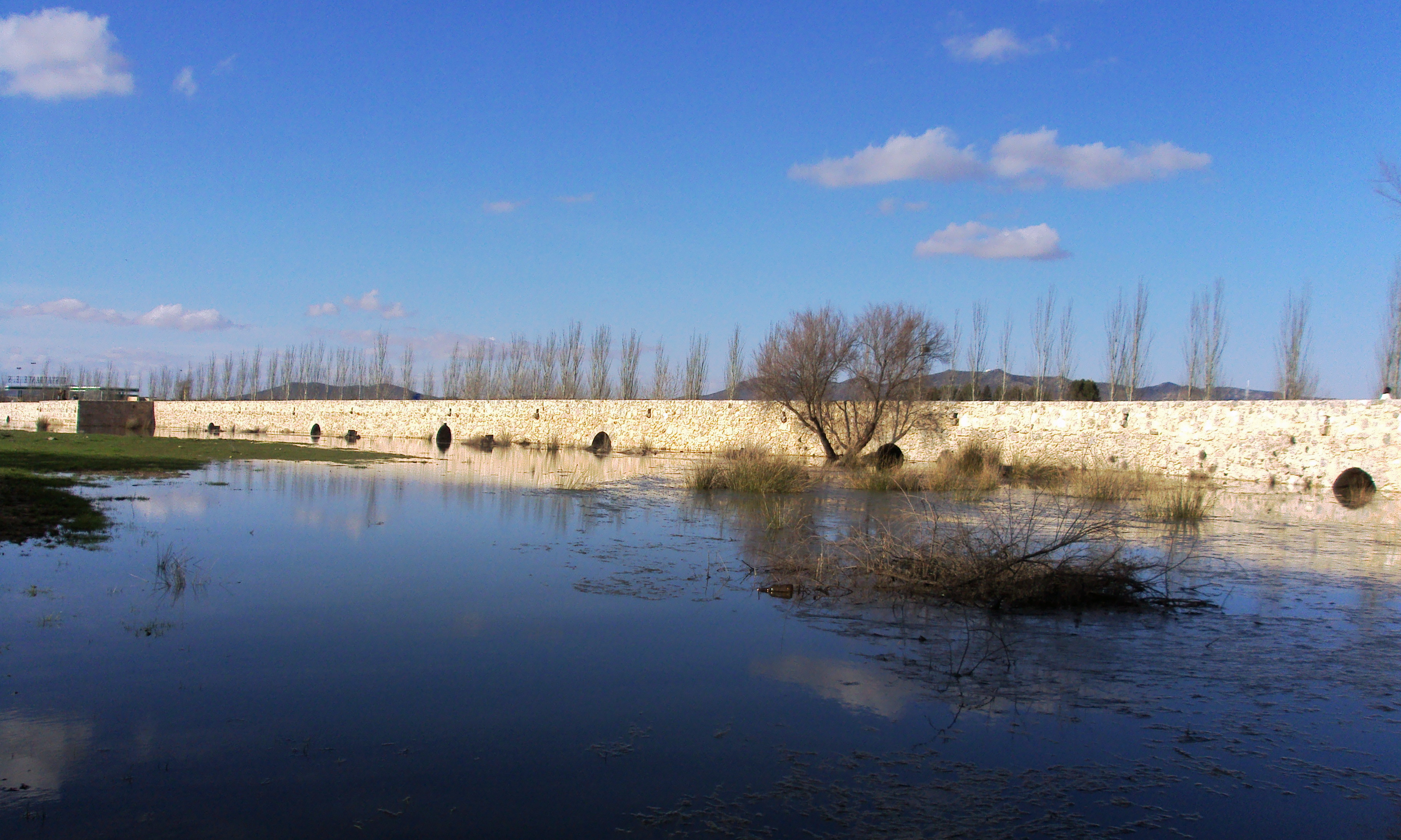
- The Cigüela near Villarta de San Juan

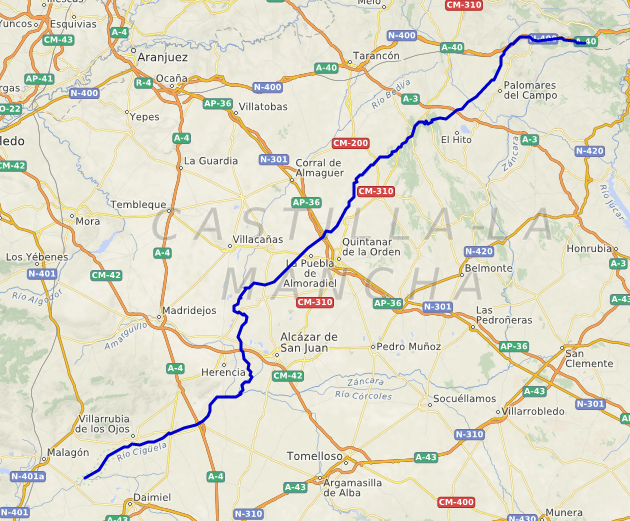

Location
- Country: Spain

Physical characteristics
- Source
  - location: Puerto de Cabrejas, Cuenca Province (Castile-La Mancha)
  - elevation: 1,180 m (3,870 ft)
- Mouth
  - location: Guadiana
  - elevation: 630 m (2,070 ft)
- Length: 225 km (140 mi)
- Basin size: 11,970 km^{2} (4,620 sq mi)
- Discharge
  - average: 1.93 m^{3}/s (68 cu ft/s)

Basin features
- Progression: Guadiana→ Gulf of Cádiz

The Cigüela or Gigüela is a 225 km long river in Castile-La Mancha, Spain, tributary to the Guadiana. Its source is near the village Puerto de Cabrejas, Iberian System, Cuenca Province. The Cigüela along with the Záncara, its main tributary, is the main water source for the Tablas de Daimiel wetlands. Other tributaries are the Jualón, Torrejón, the Valdejudíos and the Amarguillo.

The Záncara River flows into the Cigüela from the left near the Ojos del Guadiana, Villarrubia de los Ojos municipal term. There are authors though that claim that it is the Cigüela that flows into the Záncara.

== See also ==
- List of rivers of Spain
