= Campo de San Juan =

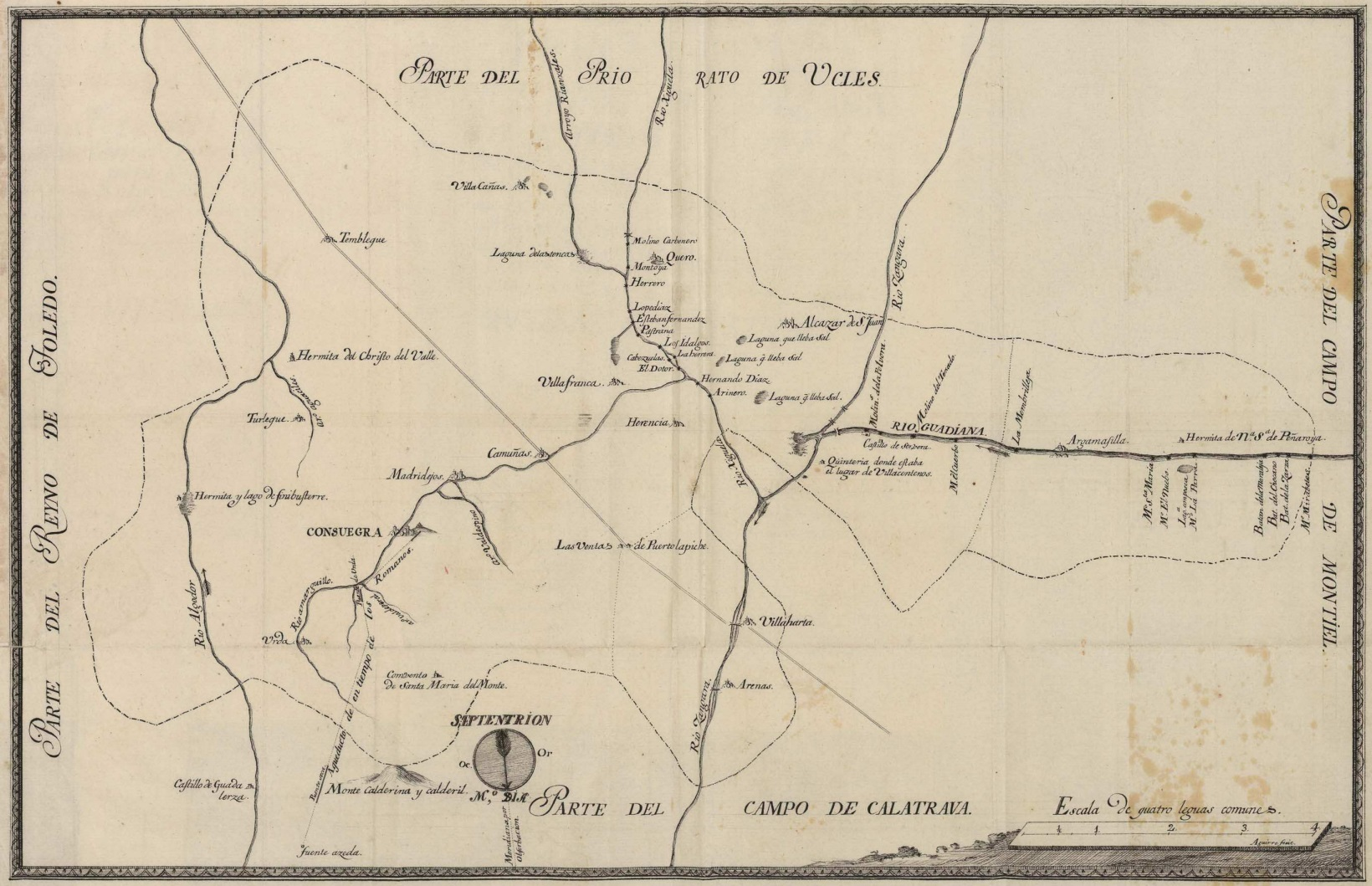
Map of the lands belonging to the priory published in 1769.

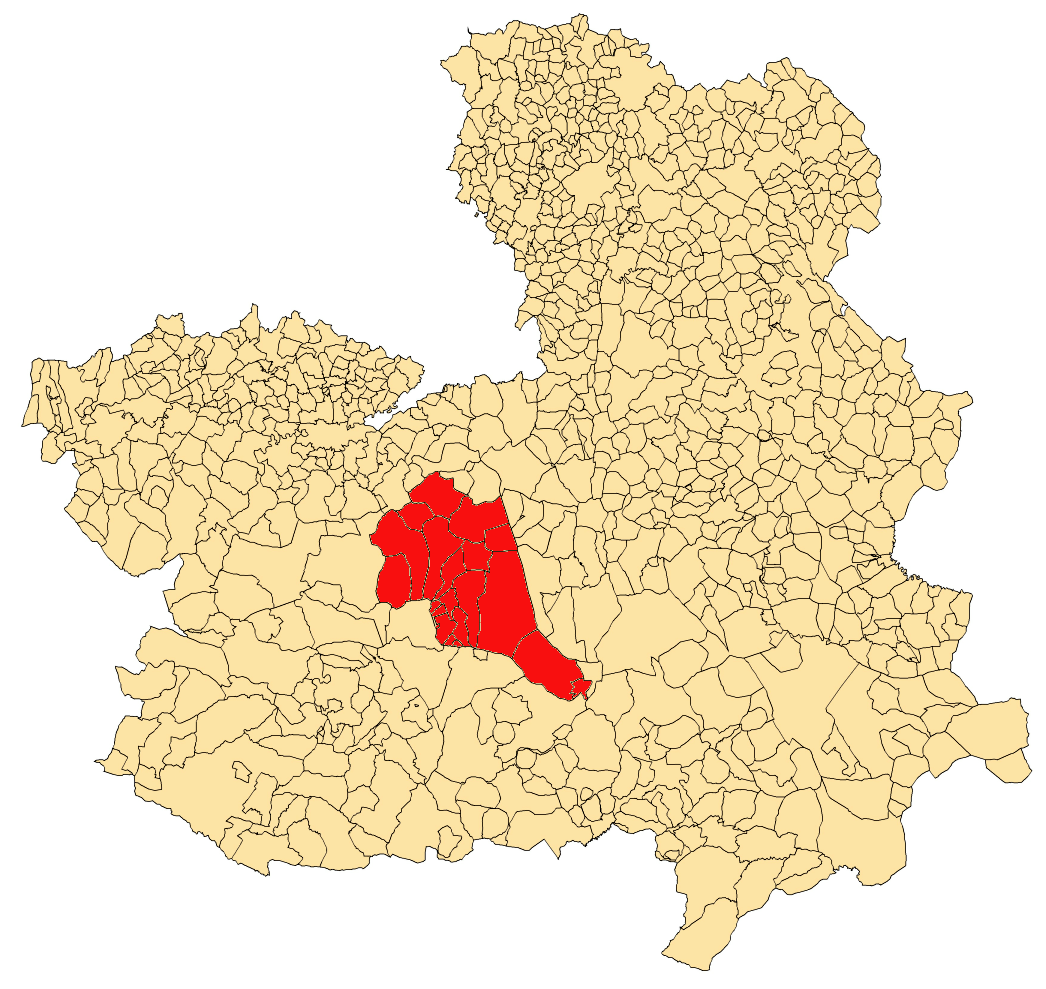
The extension of the Campo de San Juan relative to the current region of Castilla–La Mancha.

The Campo de San Juan was the seigneurial lordship of the Order of St. John in the lands of La Mancha. It was the most important possession of the Grand Priory of the langue of Castile and León. It spanned across territory of the current Spanish provinces of Toledo and Ciudad Real. The most important urban centres were Consuegra and Alcázar de San Juan.

== History ==
The presence of the Order of St. John in the lands of La Mancha started in 1162 when a number of Knights Hospitallers were donated several villages. Also in Castile, they held the fortress of Uclés from 1163 to 1174. The inception of the extensive lordship in La Mancha dates back to the concession of the Castle of Consuegra to the order by Alfonso VIII in 1183, a key development for the fortunes of the order in the Iberian peninsula.

Including the easternmost fringes of the Montes de Toledo in its western part, the territory spanned across an area of 3,983 km^{2} (2,421 in the current-day province of Toledo and 1,653 in the current-day province of Ciudad Real), limiting in the plains of La Mancha with the Campo de Calatrava (linked to the Order of Calatrava) and the Campo de Montiel (linked to the Order of Santiago).

Unlike the Hispanic military orders, the hospitallers, an "international" order, were not fully incorporated to the Hispanic Monarchy in the 15th–16th centuries, so, to a large extent, the priors retained administrative and justice powers over the jurisdiction.

By the early 16th century, Alcázar prospered, parallel to the relative decline of the stronghold of Consuegra. In the context of the struggles over the control of the priory and its ensuing split between Antonio de Estúñiga and Diego de Toledo, Consuegra, Madridejos, Camuñas, Urda, Turleque, Tembleque, Villacañas, Villarta de San Juan, Herencia and Arenas de San Juan were entrusted to the former whereas Alcázar de San Juan, Argamasilla de Alba, Quero and Villafranca de los Caballeros were given to the latter. The decision for the reunification of the territory was not taken until 1566.

At the height of the 18th century, it was the only lordship able to rival the Mitre of Toledo in terms of patrimony (land and vassals) in the Kingdom of Toledo. By 1769, the territory comprised 14 towns: Consuegra, Alcázar, Madridejos, Herencia, Villacañas, Tembleque, Villafranca, Urda, Argamasilla, Quero, Camuñas, Villarta, Turleque and Arenas. After becoming a mayorazgo-infantazgo in 1785, the langues and assemblies of the Order of Malta were fully incorporated to the Spanish Crown in 1802.
