= Javier Matilla =

Spanish footballer

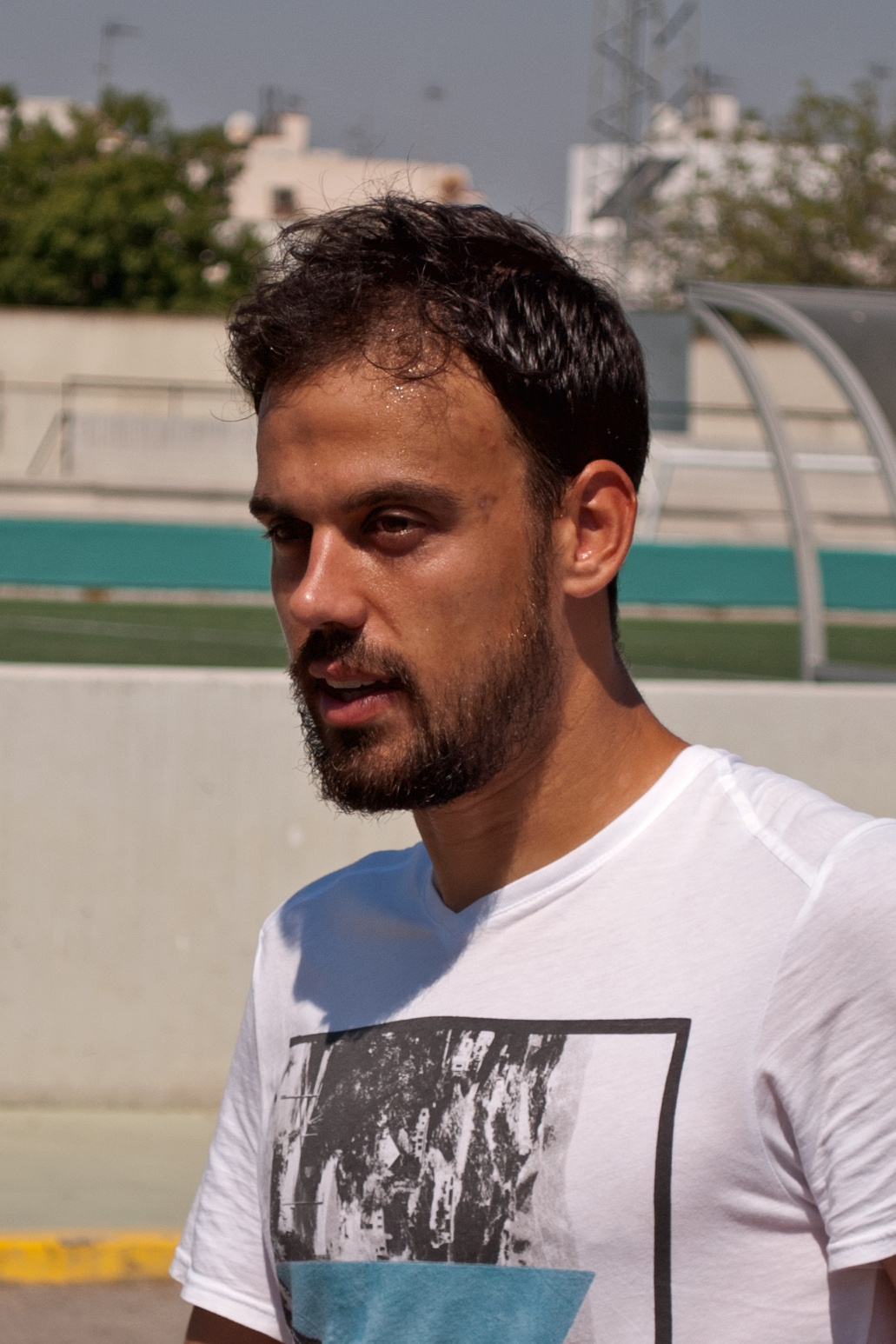
- Matilla in 2013

Personal information
- Full name: Javier Magro Matilla
- Date of birth: 16 August 1988 (age 38)
- Place of birth: Quero, Spain
- Height: 1.76 m (5 ft 9 in)
- Position: Central midfielder

Team information
- Current team: Ethnikos Piraeus

Youth career
- Albacete
- Villarreal

Senior career*
Years	Team	Apps	(Gls)
2007–2010	Villarreal B	101	(11)
2009–2011	Villarreal	14	(0)
2011–2016	Betis	52	(1)
2012–2013	→ Murcia (loan)	34	(12)
2016–2017	Elche	14	(3)
2018	Gimnàstic	10	(0)
2018–2022	Aris	118	(7)
2022–2023	Volos	13	(0)
2023–2026	Athens Kallithea	93	(9)
2026–	Ethnikos Piraeus		

International career
2009	Spain U21	1	(0)
- * Club domestic league appearances and goals as of 09:54, 20 June 2026 (UTC)

Javier Magro Matilla (born 16 August 1988) is a Spanish professional footballer who plays as a central midfielder for Gamma Ethniki club Ethnikos Piraeus.

== Club career ==
=== Spain ===
Matilla was born in Quero, Province of Toledo. After finishing his football development at Villarreal CF, he made his debut for the main squad on 4 April 2009: he started and finished the La Liga away match against UD Almería, but his team lost 3–0. In addition, he spent three full seasons with the reserves, one in the Segunda División and two in the Segunda División B.

On 28 June 2011, Matilla signed for Real Betis, recently returned to the top flight, for 3+1 years and €1.3 million. He made his official debut on 18 September, coming on as a substitute for Beñat Etxebarria in the dying minutes of a 3–2 away win over Athletic Bilbao.

Matilla was irregularly put to use during his four-and-a-half-year tenure in Andalusia, contributing 15 games and one goal as the club promoted in 2015. In the 2012–13 campaign, also in the second tier, he scored a career-best 12 goals whilst on loan to Real Murcia CF, including one in a 1–0 home victory against UD Las Palmas in the last matchday that certified survival.

In mid-October 2013, Matilla's contract was further extended until 2017, but it was mutually terminated on 15 January 2016 as the player was still nursing a serious knee injury. Subsequently, he went on trial with English Championship side Reading, but nothing came of it.

On 6 July 2016, Matilla signed for Elche CF in division two. After suffering relegation, he spent six months without a club before joining Gimnàstic de Tarragona.

=== Greece ===
On 10 July 2018, Matilla moved abroad for the first time in his career, joining Aris Thessaloniki F.C. on a one-year contract with the possibility of an additional season. On 14 January 2019, his first goal for the Greek team was scored through an injury-time free kick to help the hosts beat PAS Lamia 1964 1–0, and he repeated the feat on 17 February, this time against Panionios F.C. and also for the Super League and at the Kleanthis Vikelidis Stadium (1–1).

On 15 August 2019, Matilla opened an eventual 3–1 home win over Molde FK in the third qualifying round of the UEFA Europa League, but his side was eliminated due to a 3–0 loss in the first leg. From 2020 to 2022, he helped them to finish third in the domestic front.

Matilla remained in Greece after leaving Aris, with Volos FC (top division) and Athens Kallithea FC (Super League 2).

On 30 October 2026, Matilla signed for Gamma Ethniki club Ethnikos Piraeus on a free transfer.

== International career ==
Matilla's only cap with the Spain under-21 team arrived on 4 September 2009, as he played 15 minutes in a 2–0 win over Poland for the 2009 UEFA European Championship qualifying campaign, in Oviedo.
