= Alameda de Cervera =

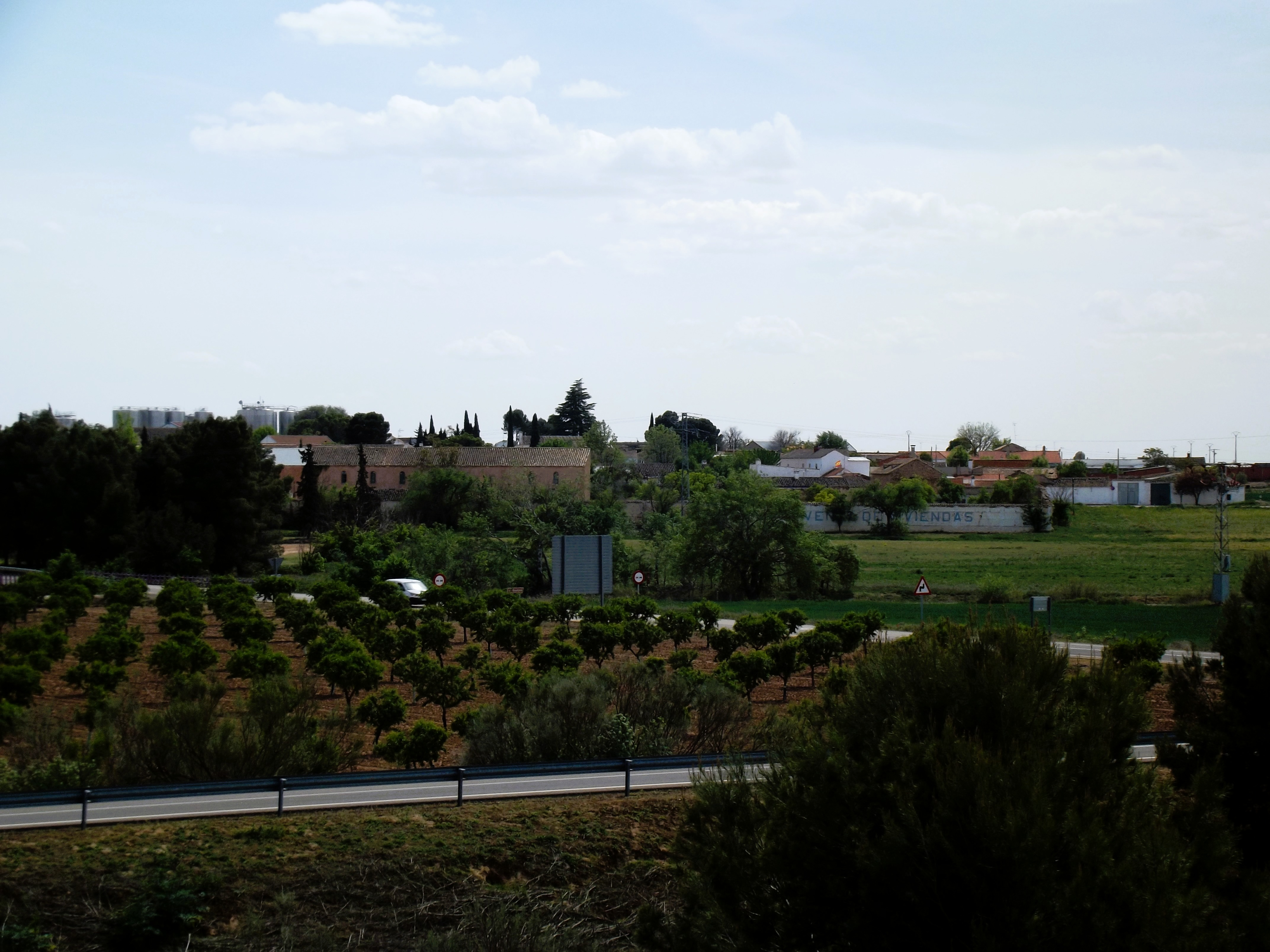
- Interactive map of Alameda de Cervera
- Location within Castilla-La Mancha
- Coordinates: 39°15′57″N 3°7′37″W
- Country: Spain
- Autonomous community: Castile-La Mancha
- Province: Ciudad Real
- Municipality: Alcázar de San Juan

Alameda de Cervera is a settlement (pedanía) belonging to the municipality of Alcázar de San Juan, Castilla–La Mancha, Spain. As of 2023, it had a population of around 300.

== History ==
In the context of the traditional saltpetre production in the area recorded since at least the 16th century, the Fábrica de Pólvora de la Real Hacienda was developed in the village, featuring four gunpowder mills. Gunpowder production peaked in the 17th century. Due to the insufficient flow for the mills caused by water usage upstream, the mills were moved to the surroundings of Ruidera in the 1780s. The village features remains of the infrastructure of the incomplete Enlightenment project of the Canal del Gran Prior ('Grand Prior's Canal') designed by Juan de Villanueva and intended to carry water from the Lagunas de Ruidera across the lands of the Campo de San Juan.
