= Villacañas =

- Municipality
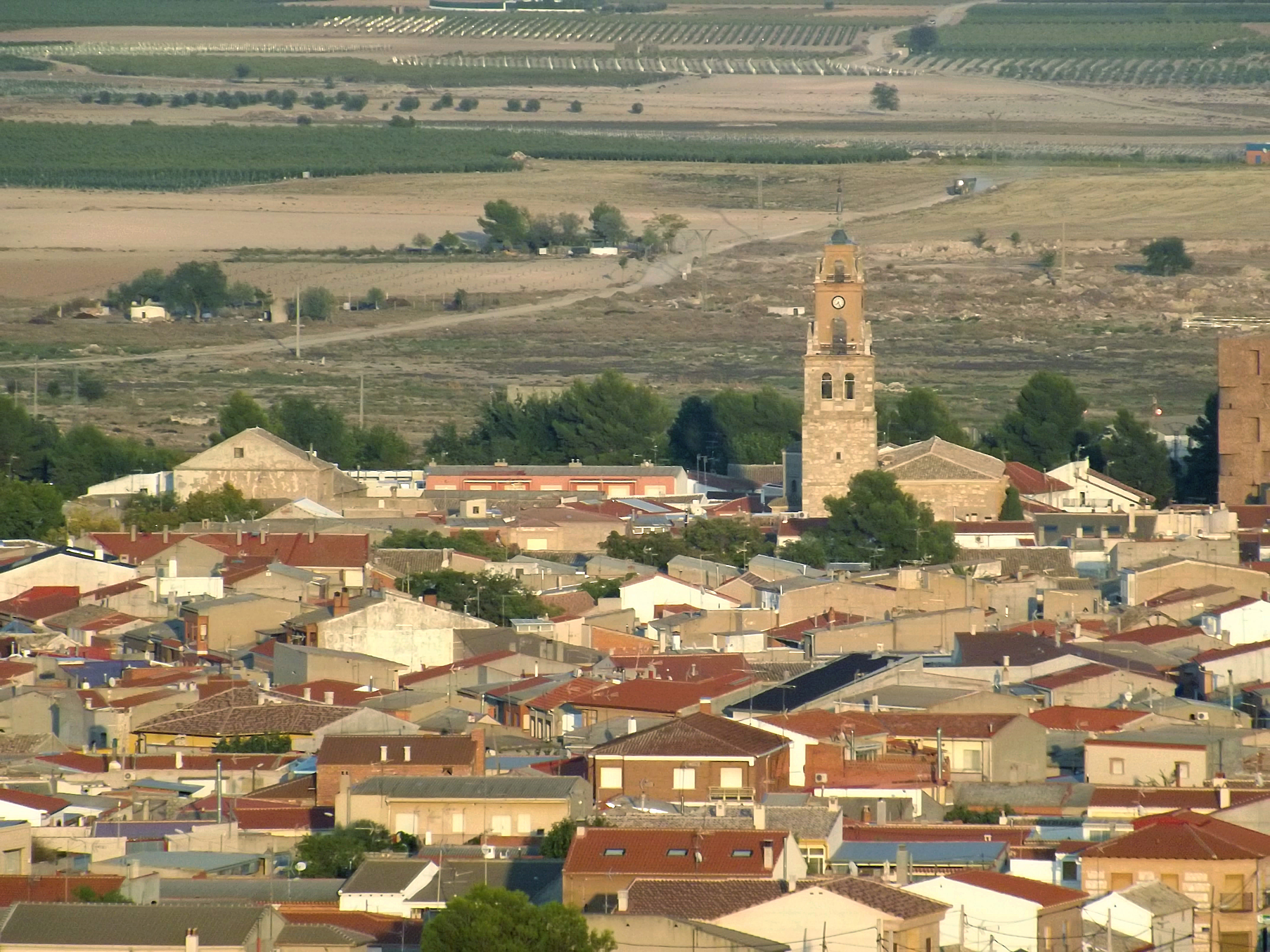

- Coat of arms

- Location within Castilla-La Mancha Location within Spain
- Coordinates: 39°38′N 3°20′W
- Country: Spain
- Autonomous community: Castile-La Mancha
- Province: Toledo

Area
  - Total: 269 km^{2} (104 sq mi)
- Elevation: 668 m (2,192 ft)
- Highest elevation (El Romeral): 877 m (2,877 ft)

Population (2025-01-01)
  - Total: 9,411
  - Density: 35.0/km^{2} (90.6/sq mi)
- Time zone: UTC+1 (CET)
  - Summer (DST): UTC+2 (CEST)

Villacañas is a municipality located in the province of Toledo, Castile-La Mancha, Spain.

== Geography ==
To the northwest of the town, the planiform relief of La Mancha is interrupted by the Sierra de El Romeral, a hill range following a NE-SE direction. At 877 metres above sea level, the highest point in the municipality is the so-called Pico de El Romeral, coterminous with the municipality of El Romeral. The town is located at about 668 metres above mean sea level. To the east and south of the town, the flat territory features an endorheic lagoon system, as well as the course of the Riánsares, a tributary of the Cigüela.

== History ==
In 1183, the territory became a possession of the Knights Hospitaller, whose priorial administration was based in Consuegra. Villacañas (or Villar de Cannas, as it was formerly cited) received a population charter in 1230. Instances of local microtoponyms suggest that the population of the territory may had been carried out by settlers from Segovia and Galicia. On 12 May 1557, the place received the privilege of township.

== Demographics ==
Historical population
Year	Pop.	±%
1900	6,212	—
1910	6,700	+7.9%
1920	7,778	+16.1%
1930	9,202	+18.3%
1940	9,137	−0.7%
1950	10,772	+17.9%
1960	10,113	−6.1%
1970	9,883	−2.3%
1981	8,251	−16.5%
1991	8,711	+5.6%
2001	9,393	+7.8%
2011	10,641	+13.3%
2021	9,434	−11.3%
2023	9,511	+0.8%
Source: ISTAT

== Bibliography ==
- Barquero Goñi, Carlos (2023). "La Orden de San Juan en el Reino de Toledo durante los siglos XII y XIII: Gienes patrimoniales y encomiendas" [The Order of Saint John in the Kingdom of Toledo during the Twelfth and Thirteenth Centuries: Properties and Commanderies]. Espacio, Tiempo y Gorma. Serie III, Historia Medieval (36). Madrid: Universidad Nacional de Educación a Distancia: 211–264. ISSN 0214-9745.
- García Montes, Luis (1986). "Los silos de Villacañas" (PDF). Anales Toledanos (22). Toledo: Real Academia de Bellas Artes y Ciencias Históricas de Toledo: 117–152. ISSN 0538-1983.
- Jiménez de Gregorio, Fernando (1999). La Mancha toledana (PDF). Toledo: Diputación Provincial. ISBN 84-87103-92-8.
- Sesmero Ortiz, Eduardo (2021). El sureste de la provincia de Toledo en época romana. Madrid: Universidad Complutense de Madrid.
