= Battle of Consuegra =

1097 battle of Spanish Reconquista

Coordinates: 39°27′N 3°36′W

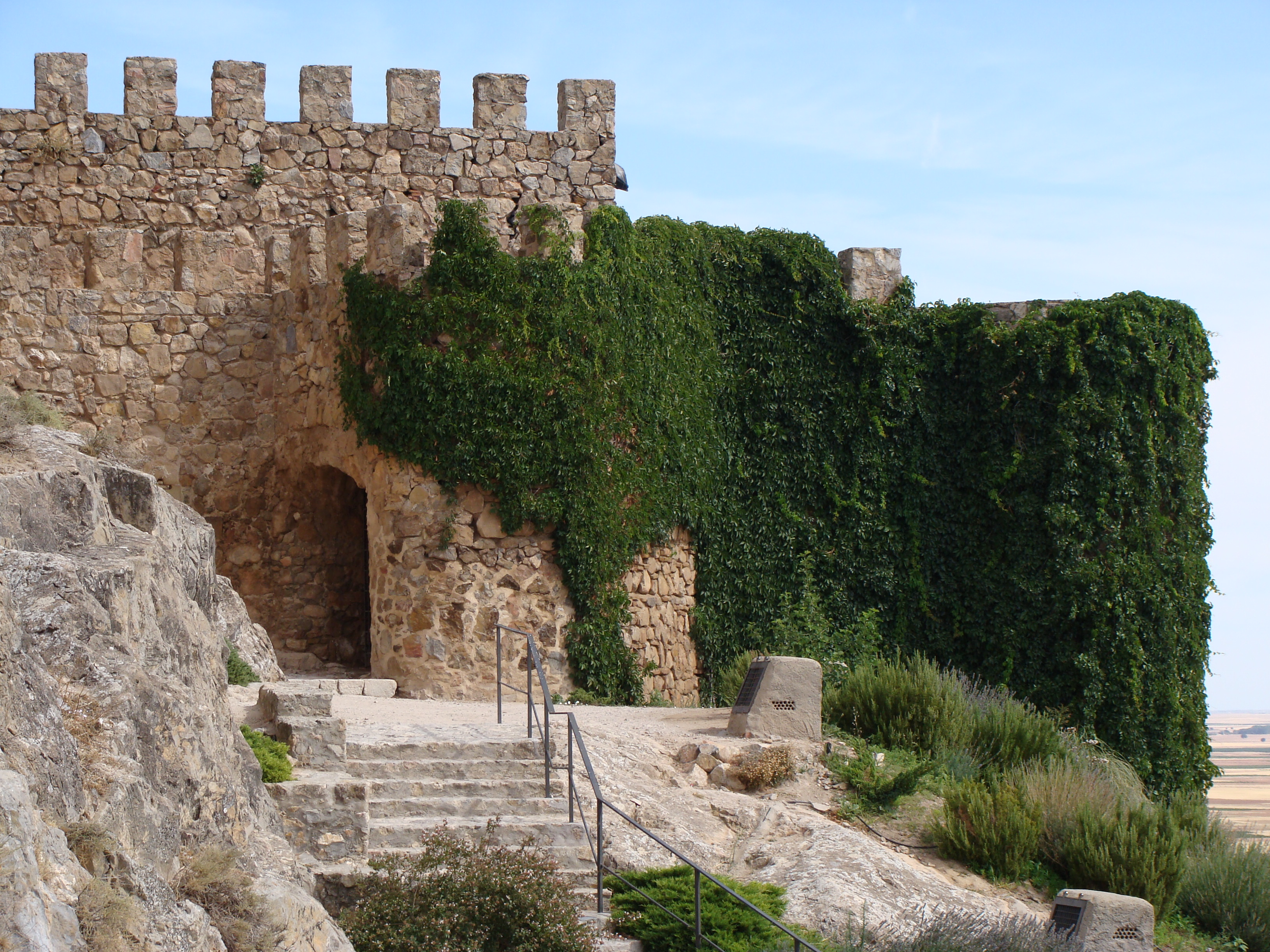
- Castle of La Muela in Consuegra.
Date	15 August 1097
Location	Consuegra
Result	Almoravid victory

Belligerents
Almoravid dynasty	Kingdom of Castile; Kingdom of León

Commanders and leaders
Muhammad ibn Al-Haj	Alfonso VI of León and Castile; Diego Rodríguez †

The Battle of Consuegra took place during the Spanish Reconquista on 15 August 1097 near the village of Consuegra in the province of Castile-La Mancha between the Castilian and Leonese army of Alfonso VI and the Almoravids under Yusuf ibn Tashfin.

== History ==
In 1097, the Almoravid leader, Yusuf ibn Tasfhin, crossed the Strait of Gibraltar where he went to Cordoba intending to sack the suburbs of Toledo. The Castilian-Leonese king, Alfonso, who had already mustered his army to besiege Zaragoza, learned of the upcoming Almoravid invasion and decided to meet them. The Castilian knight, El Cid, sent his son Diego Rodríguez with an army to assist the king all while staying in Valencia.

Yusuf had already gathered his army, which consisted of Almoravids and Andalusian men. Yusuf then gave the command to his general, Muhammad ibn Al-Haj. Yusuf chose not to participate as he intended to cover the retreat of his troops in case they lost. Both armies met at Consuegra. The Almoravids with their tactics, routed the Christians and threw their vanguard in confusion. Diego Rodriquez was slain in the battle and the king retreated towards the Consuegra castle.

The Almoravids invested the castle for eight days before retreating. The battle happened on Saturday, August 15, 1097.

== Sources ==
- Muhammad Abdullah Enan (1960), The State of Islam in Andalusia, Vol. II: The Taifa states.
- Ramón Menéndez Pidal (2016), The Cid and His Spain.
