= Tembleque (disambiguation) =

Tembleque may refer to:

- Tembleque, a coconut dessert pudding from Puerto Rico
- Pollera, tembleques - a type of skirt- clothing
- Tembleque, Spain
