= Alcázar de San Juan =

- Municipality
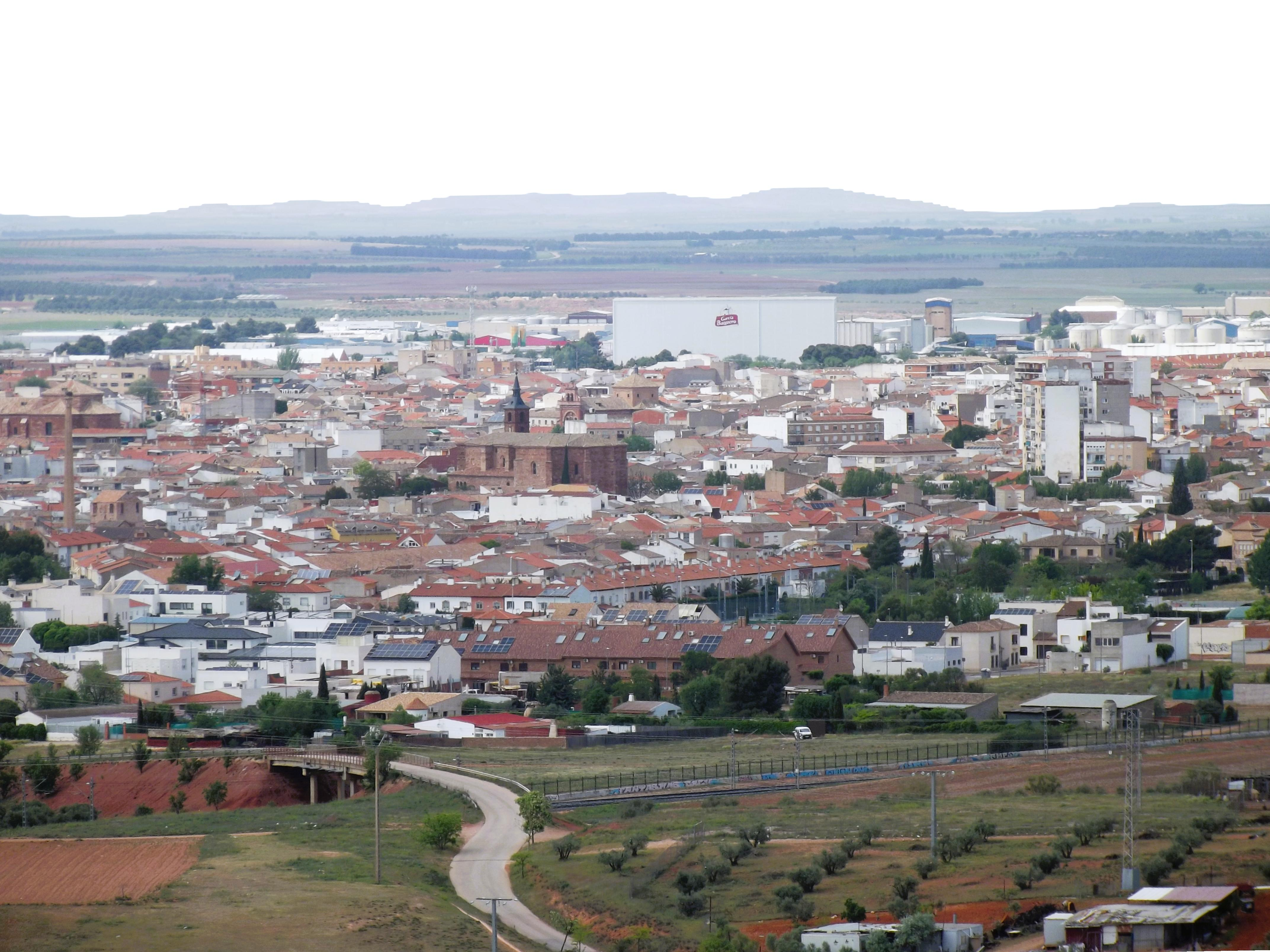

- Flag Coat of arms
- Interactive map of Alcázar de San Juan
- Location within Castilla-La Mancha Location within Spain
- Coordinates: 39°24′20″N 3°12′20″W
- Country: Spain
- Autonomous community: Castilla–La Mancha
- Province: Ciudad Real

Government
  - Type: Ayuntamiento
  - Mayor: Rosa Melchor (PSOE)

Area
  - Total: 666.78 km^{2} (257.45 sq mi)
- Elevation: 644 m (2,113 ft)

Population (2025-01-01)
  - Total: 31,914
  - Density: 47.863/km^{2} (123.96/sq mi)
- Demonym: Alcazareños
- Time zone: UTC+1 (CET)
  - Summer (DST): UTC+2 (CEST)
- Postal code: 13600
- Website: Official website

Alcázar de San Juan is a city and municipality of Spain located in the province of Ciudad Real, autonomous community of Castilla–La Mancha. It lies on the plain of La Mancha. From the 13th to the 19th century the history of Alcázar is strongly linked to the Grand Priory of the Order of St. John of Jerusalem. The city became a railway hub in the 19th century.

== Geography ==
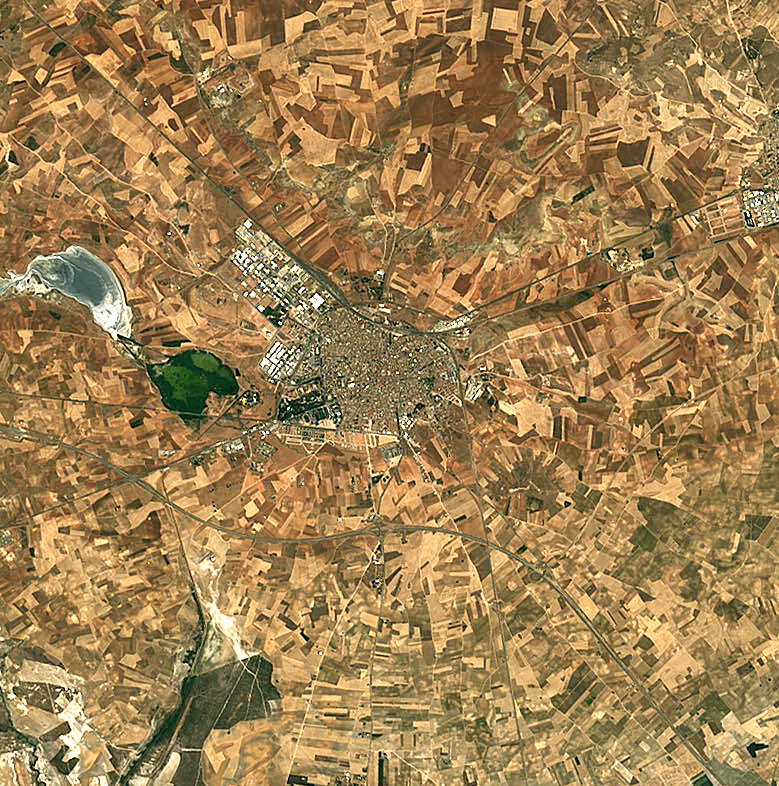
Satellite view centered on the city

The municipality is part the large plain of La Mancha, standing at around 650 metres above sea level. The area is drained by two tributaries of the Guadiana: the Cigüela and the Záncara, located to the west and south of the urban centre, respectively.

The municipal area also features a number of endorheic saline lagoons surrounding the city, including the Alcázar de San Juan lagoon complex (lagoons of Camino de Villafranca, Las Yeguas and La Veguilla).

In addition to the urban centre of Alcázar de San Juan, the municipality includes the settlements of Cinco Casas (an EATIM) and Alameda de Cervera.

== Name ==
Its name is taken from an old moorish fortress (اَلْقَصْر in Arabic language), which was afterwards garrisoned by the knights of St John (San Juan in Spanish language).

It was known as "Alcázar de Consuegra" in the past.

== History ==
=== Middle ages ===
The area was conquered by Alfonso VI and then by Almoravids. Following the new Christian conquest of the area, Alcázar was donated to three individual knights in 1150. The heir of one of them transferred the hamlet to the Order of Santiago, who donated Alcázar to the Order of St. John in exchange for the hamlet of Criptana, and thus Alcázar took the name of "Alcázar de Consuegra", as it eventually became part of the Priory of St. John centered in Consuegra. There is no historical record concerning the phase of Almohad occupation and archaeological findings are inconclusive.

Alcázar was granted a population charter in 1241. In 1292, Fernán Pérez, Commander of the Order, granted Alcázar the privilege of township (villazgo), which was confirmed by Sancho IV in that year and ratified by Ferdinand IV in 1300.

=== Modern era ===
By the early 16th century, Alcázar thrived as town of the Priory of St. John (extending across territory in the current-day provinces of Toledo and Ciudad Real), parallel to the relative decline of its capital of Consuegra. In the context of the struggles over the control of the priory and its ensuing split between Antonio de Estúñiga and Diego de Toledo, Alcázar reportedly became part of the latter's possessions. The territory was not reunited until 1566. Since the 16th century, a saltpetre factory operated in Alcázar, using rocks from the nearby site of Los Sitios located to the east of the town. By the late 18th century, the plant had 12 cauldrons producing 5,000 arrobas of salpetre on an annual basis.

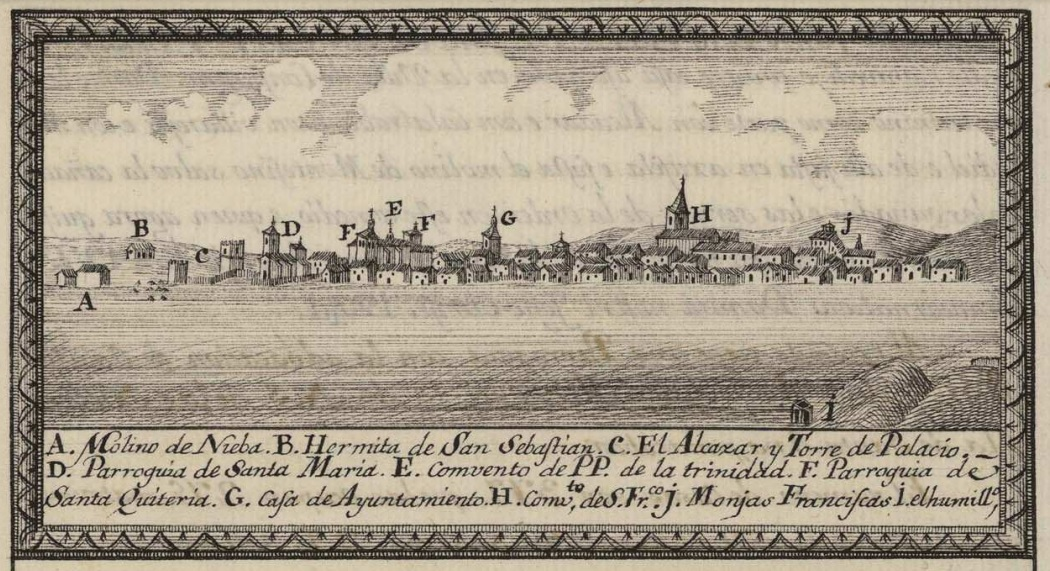
View published in the Descripción histórica del Gran Priorato de San Juan Bautista de Jerusalén en los reinos de Castilla y León (1769)

Railways arrived to Alcázar de San Juan in 1854, as part of the Aranjuez–Almansa line, and, in 1861, another line was opened (Alcázar–Manzanares–Daimiel–Almagro–Ciudad Real).

The town was granted the title of city (ciudad) in April 1877.

The famous Third Mixed Brigade (Tercera Brigada Mixta) of the Spanish Republican Army was established in Alcázar de San Juan in 1936 during the Spanish Civil War.

== Transport ==
Alcázar de San Juan has a reputation as railway hub. It is part of the Madrid–Valencia and Alcázar de San Juan–Cádiz lines.

Since 2015, the city has struggled for years to move forward with the project for the construction of the Plataforma Logística Intermodal "Mancha Centro", a dry port.

== Energy ==
Two solar thermal power plants owned by ACS/Grupo Cobra, Manchasol-1 and Manchasol-2, are located in the municipality. They both use parabolic trough technology and produce 49.9 MW and 50 MW, respectively.

== Main sights ==
- Old windmills
- Tower of the Grand Prior (14th century)
- Church of St. Mary Major (13th-15th centuries)
- Church of St. Francis of Assisi (14th-15th centuries)
- Convent of St. Claire (16th century)
- Municipal Museum of Alcázar de San Juan (16th century)
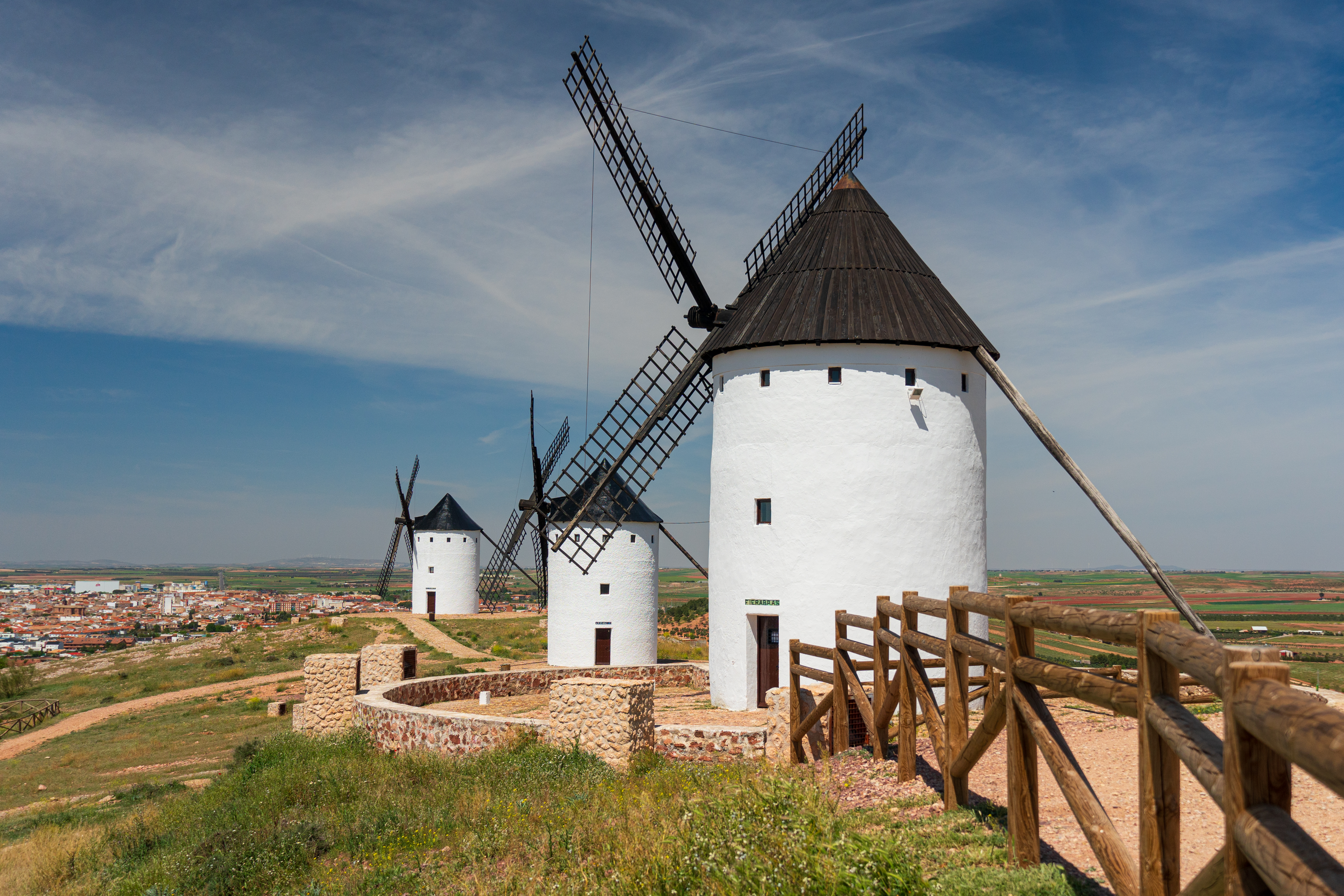
Old windmills

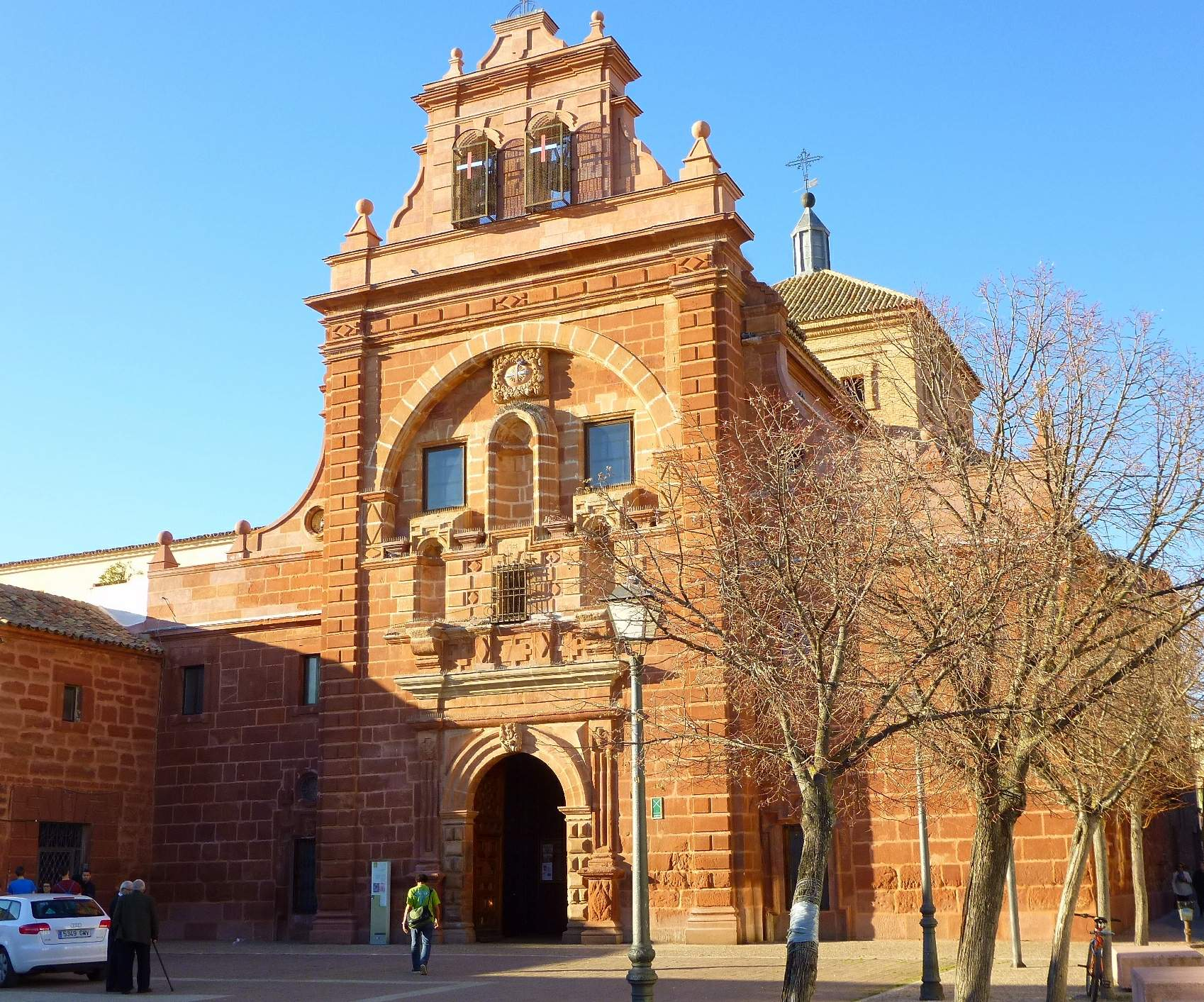
Holy Trinity Church.

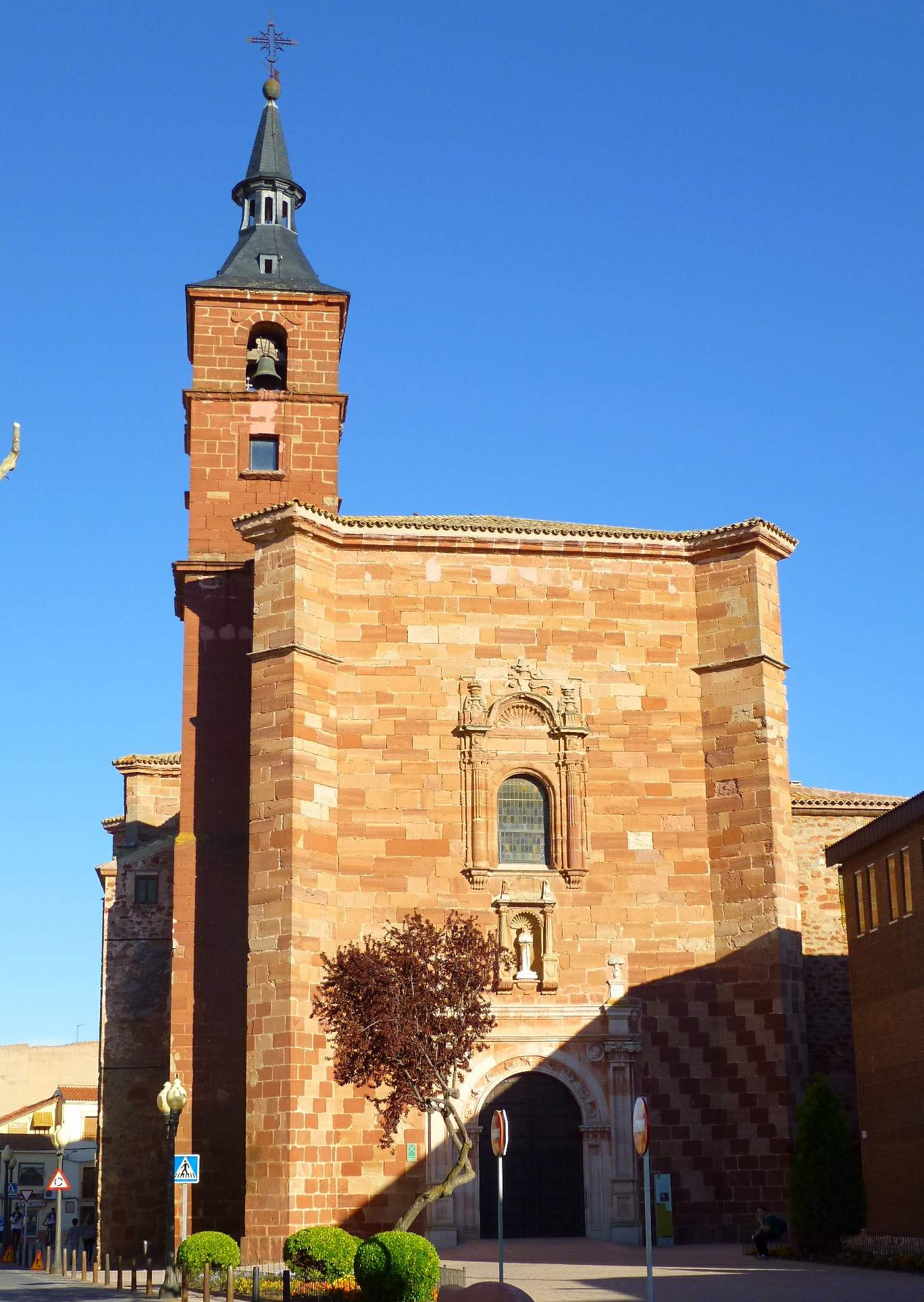
Saint Francis Church.

== International relations ==
Twin towns and sister cities

Alcázar de San Juan is twinned with:

- Mâcon, France (1980)
- Guanajuato, Mexico (2014).

== Notable people ==
- José Antonio Redondo, cyclist.
- Ángel Lizcano Monedero y Esteban, (1846–1929) was a Spanish painter and illustrator.
