= Nena Goodman =

Nena Manach Goodman (1910 - March 19, 1998) was an artist, arts' patron, and philanthropist. She specialized in the painting of oil miniatures. Goodman's husband, Andrew Goodman, was the owner and chairman of New York department store Bergdorf Goodman. Nena managed Nena's Choice Gallery located on the fourth floor of the store of the store.

== Biography ==
Nena Goodman was born Nena Manach in Tembleque, Spain and raised in Cuba. Her brother was Jorge Manach y Robato, an attorney and activist exiled from Cuba to Puerto Rico for opposing Fidel Castro in the 1960s. She met her husband, Andrew, in 1935.

Goodman was an artist who specialized in the painting of oil miniatures of flowers and buildings. Her paintings often measured one inch by one inch.

Nena managed Nena's Choice Gallery, a space within Bergdorf Goodman where she exhibited the work of young artists. Her husband was the owner and chairman of the store having taken over from his father, Edwin, the store's founder.

Nena, her husband, and their children maintained a home in Rye, New York, and a penthouse apartment located on the top floor of Bergdorf Goodman.

Goodman died March 19, 1998, at the age of 88.
