= Diego Álvarez de Toledo =

Spanish military commander (died 1557)

- Died: 1557
- Military career
- Service years: 1512-1540
- Rank: Captain general
- Conflicts: Spanish conquest of Iberian Navarre

Diego de Toledo (Diego Álvarez de Toledo) was a military commander and prior in 15th century Aragon.

== Early life ==
He participated with his father in the campaign of Navarre in 1512 and was Prior of the Order of St. John. As prior of St. John, he founded Argamasilla de Alba in 1540.

== Career ==
Diego de Toledo served as captain in the army that his father, Fadrique Álvarez de Toledo, commanded in 1512 for the Conquest of Navarre by order of King Ferdinand II of Aragon.

In 1517 the position of prior of the Order of San Juan was held by Antonio de Zúñiga, brother of the Duke of Béjar, a position that was then highly appreciated in Castile. King Charles I of Spain, while still in Flanders, negotiated with the Duke of Alba and his son to vacate the priory, which was then granted to Zúñiga as ordered from the Holy See. The Duke of Alba opposed this decision, because he affirmed that by the bull of Pope Martin to John II and by immemorial custom, the king had the right to appoint the prior. Zúñiga defended himself by saying that this appointment had been to his detriment, because his uncle had occupied this position under Henry IV of Castile.

When he arrived in Castilla, Charles divided the priory and left both as priors, one based in Consuegra and another in Alcázar de San Juan. On July 3, 1531, the Alcázar Chapter was held with the presence of the friar Diego Álvarez de Toledo, as provincial chapter of the priory. The topic to be discussed was the designation of goods to a convent. Several members of the Military Order of the Hospital of St. John of Jerusalem attended: Order of St. John, Order of Ochre, Order of Rhodes, Order of Malta and Hospitallers. Among them was Diego Briceño, Commander of Bamba.

He died on the border with Perpignan, with the rank of captain general.
