= Diego Rodríguez (son of El Cid) =

Son of The Cid Campeador

Diego Rodríguez or Diego Ruiz (died 15 August 1097) was the only son of Rodrigo Díaz de Vivar, El Cid Campeador, and his wife, Jimena Díaz.

The earliest reference to El Cid's son is in the Historia Roderici, which under the year 1088 reports that after the siege of Aledo, King Alfonso VI of Castile captured El Cid's wife and children, releasing them a few weeks later. The Historia does not name the children nor explicitly refer to a son, but its use of the masculine plural liberos implies the presence of a male among the captive family. The Linaje de Rodrigo Díaz associated with the Liber regum, written about a century later in Navarre, explicitly attributes to El Cid and Jimena one son, 'Diago Royz'. Ambrosio Huici Miranda's theory that Diego was the son of El Cid by an earlier wife is based on the less reliable Mocedades de Rodrigo.

According to the later chronicle tradition found in the Estoria de España, shortly after the capture of Valencia in 1094, El Cid ordered his men to give the same deference to those Muslims remaining in the city as they would to himself or his son. This implies that his son was also in Valencia at the time and was of an age that he could walk the streets unaccompanied by his parents. Estoria de España (as 'Diag Royz') and Linaje de Rodrigo Díaz both record Diego's death at the battle of Consuegra fighting in the army of Alfonso VI against the Almoravids on 15 August 1097.

Since 1997 an annual commemoration of his death has been held in Consuegra.
