= Herencia =

Municipality of Spain

- Municipality
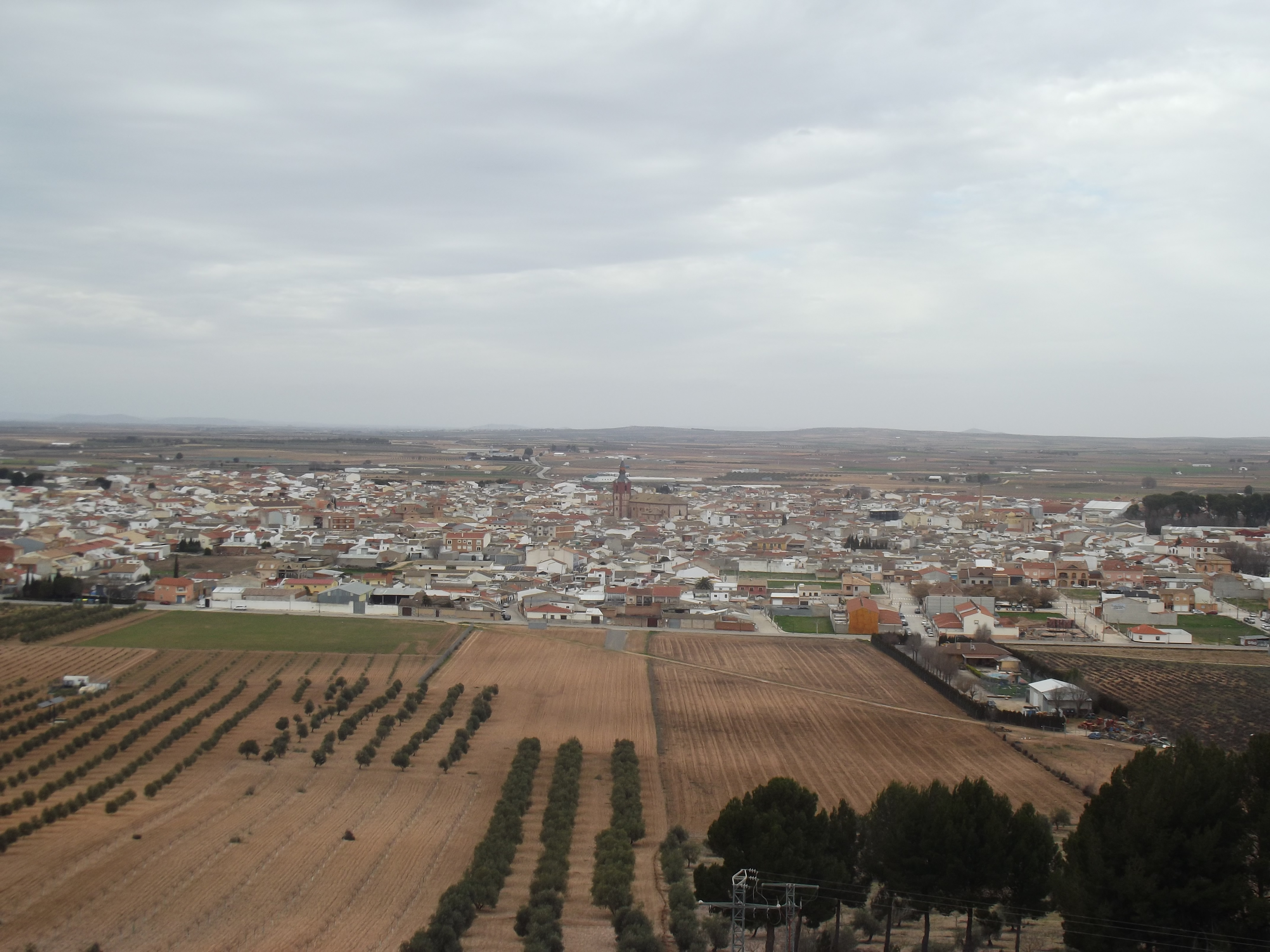
- View from the southeast

- Flag Coat of arms
- Interactive map of Herencia
- Location within Castilla-La Mancha Location within Spain
- Coordinates: 39°22′1″N 3°21′18″W
- Country: Spain
- Autonomous community: Castilla–La Mancha
- Province: Ciudad Real

Government
  - Mayor: Sergio García Navas Corrales (PSOE)

Area
  - Total: 226.75 km^{2} (87.55 sq mi)
- Elevation: 643 m (2,110 ft)

Population (2020)
  - Total: 8,456
  - Density: 37.29/km^{2} (96.59/sq mi)
- Time zone: UTC+1 (CET)
  - Summer (DST): UTC+2 (CEST)
- Website: herencia.es

Herencia is a municipality located in the province of Ciudad Real, in the autonomous community of Castilla-La Mancha, Spain. As of 2020, it had a population of 8,456.The postal code is 13640.

== History ==
In the context of a series of new settlements founded in the Campo de San Juan in the 13th century by the Consuegra-headquartered Priory of the Order of St. John of Jerusalem, Herencia received a carta puebla ('population charter') in 1239. It was granted the privilege of township in 1350.

== Interesting monuments and places ==
- The Church of La Inmaculada Concepción
- The Church of Our Lady of Mercy, which was a Mercedarian monastery in the past.
- The Windmills
- "La copa", a water tank created in 1946, located next to the natural reserve of "La Pedriza".
- "Los Caños", old fountains that supplied water to the town in the past.
- The Public Park, where we can find a great variety of natural vegetation of the area.
- The hermitages of San Cristóbal, San Bartolomé, San Antón, La Asunción (commonly called "La Labradora"), el Santo Cristo de la Misericordia, San José and La Encarnación.

== Bibliography ==
- Huerta García, Florencio; Muela Fernández, Nieves Esther; Poveda de Campos, Irene (1991). Herencia y la Orden de San Juan (siglos XIII - XX) (PDF). Ciudad Real: Diputación Provincial de Ciudad Real. ISBN 84-7789-059-5.
