= Quero, Spain =

Quero
- Municipality
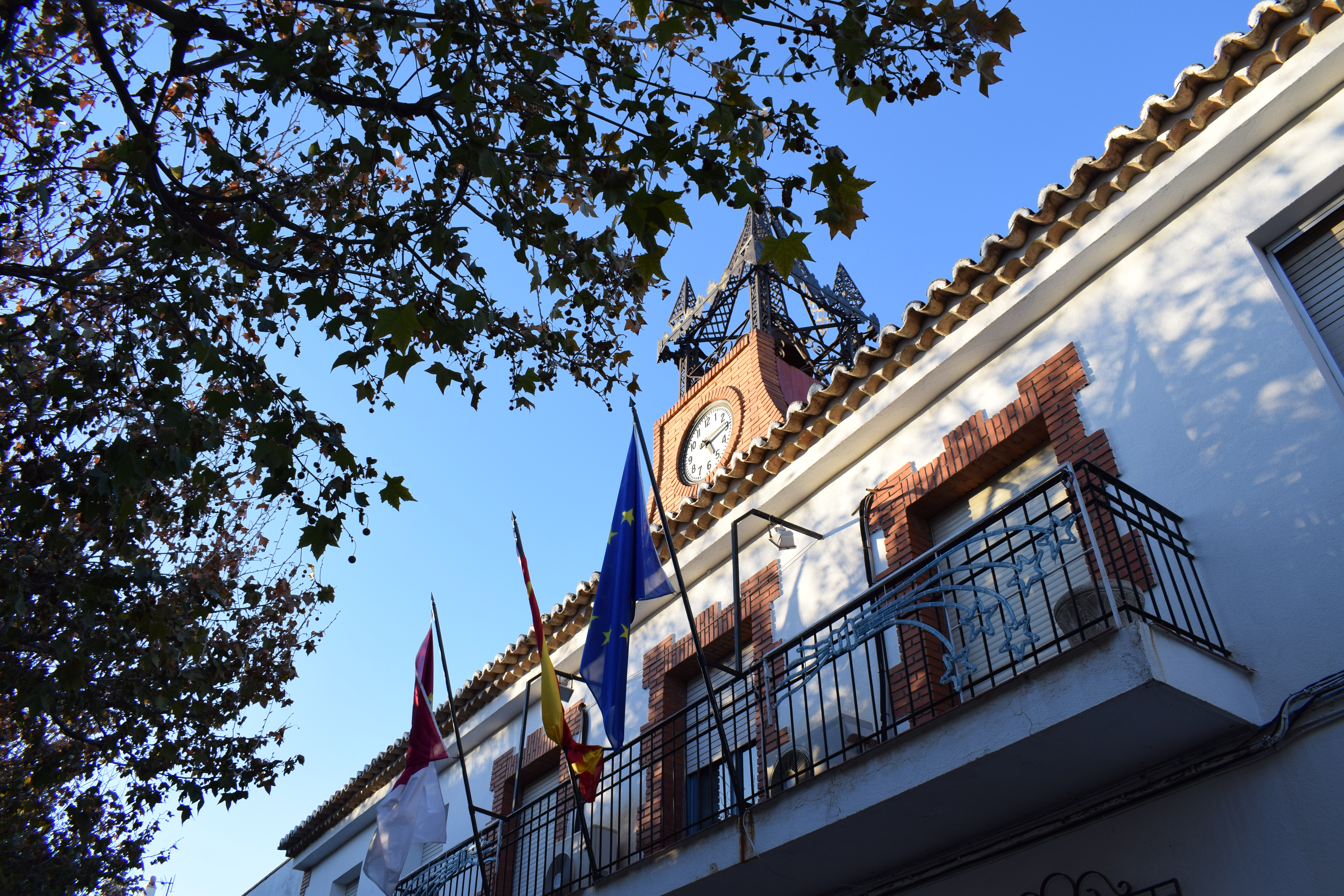
- Town hall

- Coat of arms

- Location in Spain
- Coordinates: 39°30′29″N 3°14′49″W
- Country: Spain
- Autonomous community: Castile-La Mancha
- Province: Toledo
- Comarca: Mancha Alta de Toledo

Area
  - Total: 103.92 km^{2} (40.12 sq mi)
- Elevation: 648.9 m (2,129 ft)

Population (2025-01-01)
  - Total: 1,006
  - Density: 9.681/km^{2} (25.07/sq mi)
- Demonym: Quereño/Quereña
- Time zone: UTC+1 (CET)
  - Summer (DST): UTC+2 (CEST)
- Postal code: 45790

Quero is a municipality in the province of Toledo, Castile-La Mancha, in central Spain. According to the 2012 census the municipality has a population of 1,311 inhabitants, down from a total of 3,101 in the 1930 census.

== Location ==
Quero is located 107 km east of Toledo. Historically it is documented that in 1162, during the Reconquista, its lands belonged to the Sovereign Military Order of Malta. In 1241 the lands were handed over to the Comendador of Consuegra.

Quero lies close to a relatively large pond known as Laguna Grande. The town is located in the comarca of Mancha Alta de Toledo, named after the historical and natural region of La Mancha.

== Demographics ==
Historical population
| Year | Pop. | ±% |
|---|---|---|
| 1900 | 2,144 | — |
| 1910 | 2,470 | +15.2% |
| 1920 | 2,757 | +11.6% |
| 1930 | 3,101 | +12.5% |
| 1940 | 2,896 | −6.6% |
| 1950 | 3,051 | +5.4% |
| 1960 | 2,655 | −13.0% |
| 1970 | 1,838 | −30.8% |
| 1981 | 1,727 | −6.0% |
| 1991 | 1,419 | −17.8% |
| 2001 | 1,257 | −11.4% |
| 2011 | 1,344 | +6.9% |
| 2021 | 977 | −27.3% |
| 2023 | 1,012 | +3.6% |
Source: ISTAT

== See also ==
- List of municipalities in Toledo
