= Castle of La Muela =

- Castillo de la Muela
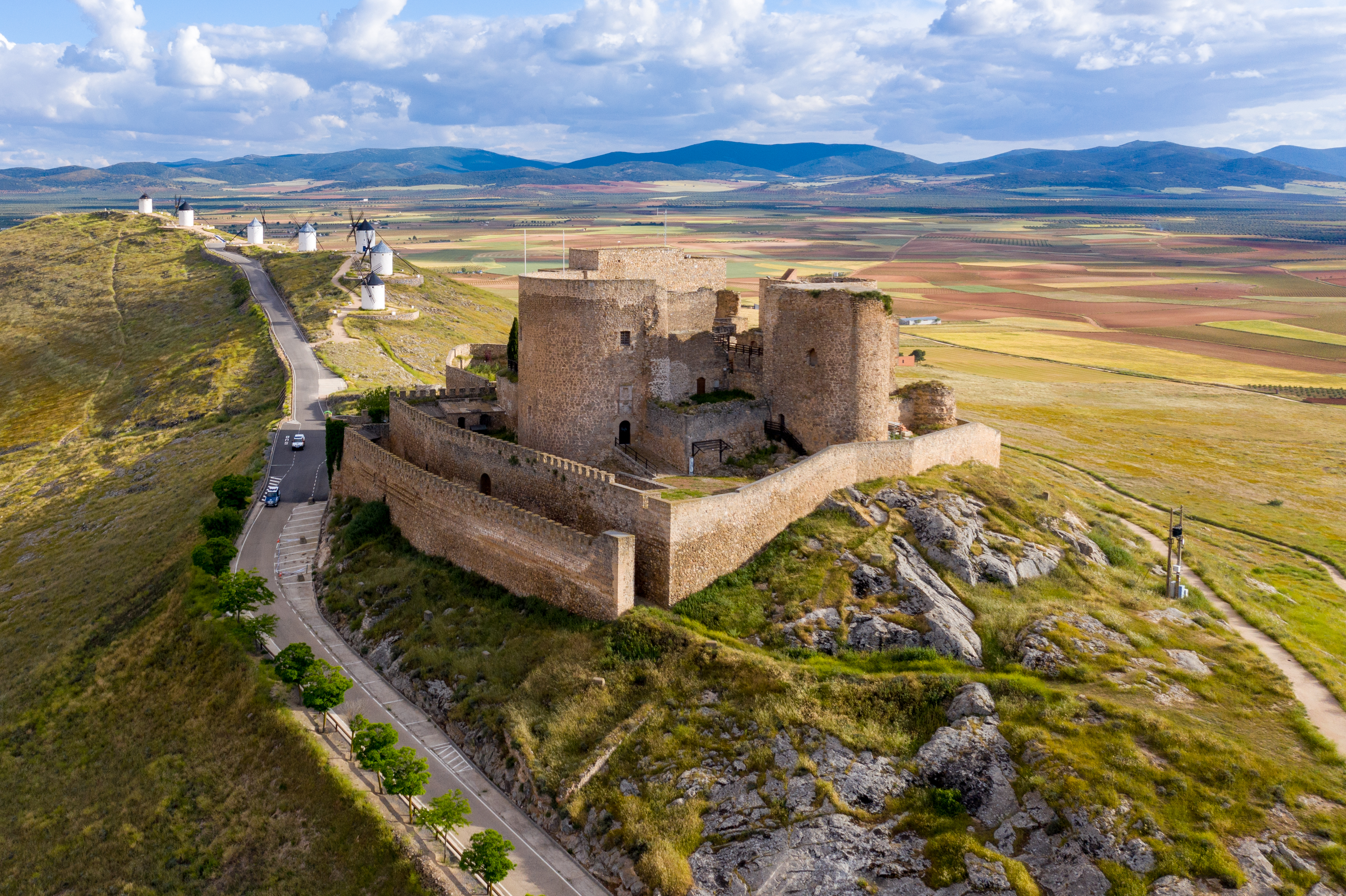
- Interactive map of the Castle of La Muela area

General information
- Location: Cerro Calderico, Consuegra, Spain
- Coordinates: 39°27′10″N 3°36′28″W
- Owner: Ayuntamiento de Consuegra

The Castle of La Muela (Spanish: Castillo de la Muela) is a castle in Consuegra, Spain. It was a stronghold of the Knights Hospitaller during the Middle Ages.

== History and description ==
The castle tops off the Cerro Calderico, that also hosts a number of windmills, dominating over Consuegra.

Gifted by Alfonso VIII to the Knights of Saint John of Jerusalem in 1183 along its dominions, the most relevant features of the fortification are dated after the donation, largely a number of expansions and restorations in the 12th and 13th centuries. An hermitage was built in the castle in the late 15th century. The castle endured notable damage during the Peninsular War. It became a municipal property in 1962.

The whole Cerro Calderico—along the castle and the windmills—was declared Bien de Interés Cultural under the protection status of "historical site" in 2008.
