= Tembleque, Spain =

Place in Castile-La Mancha, Spain

Tembleque
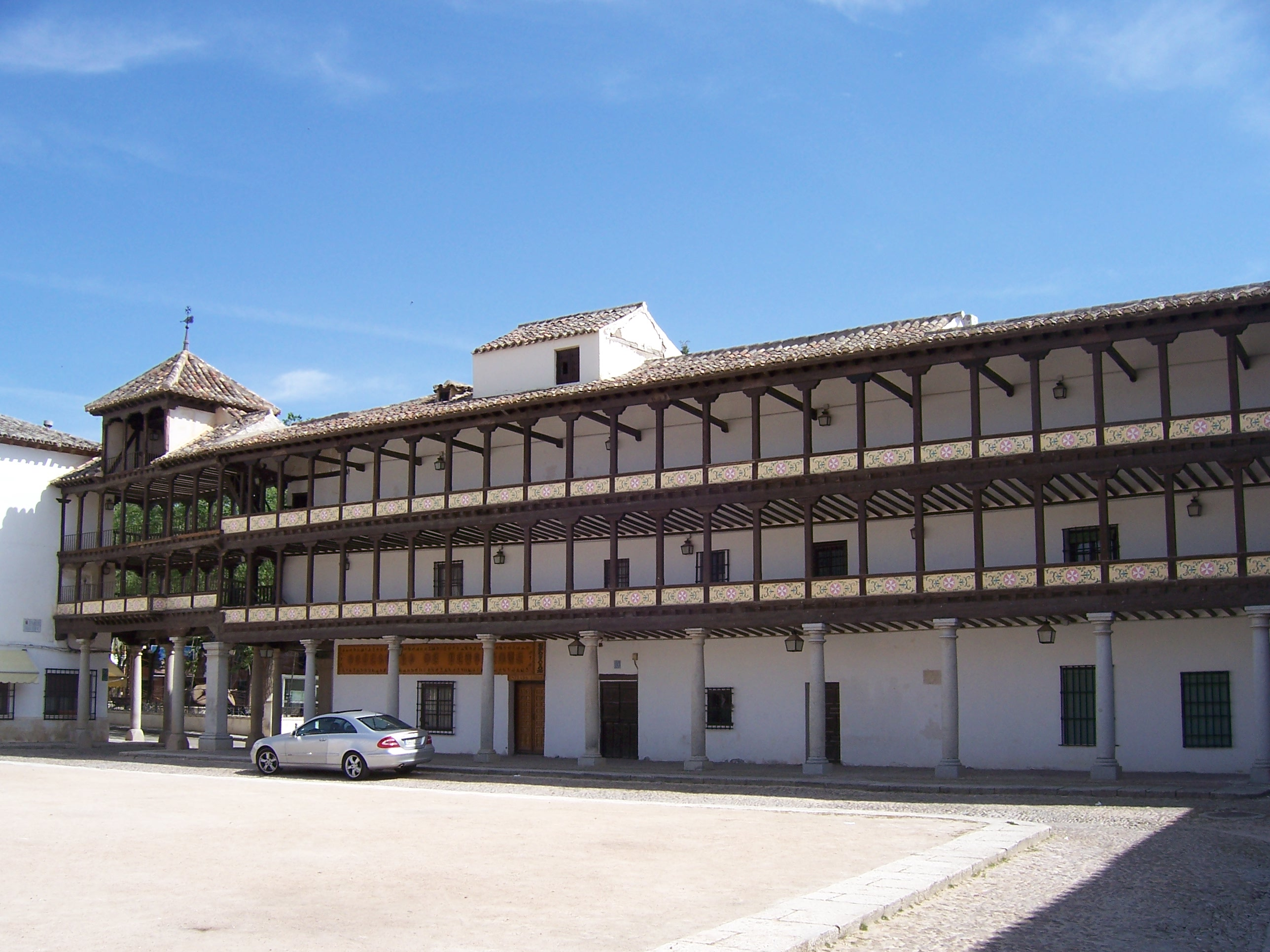

- Flag Coat of arms

- Location within Spain Location within Castilla-La Mancha
- Coordinates: 39°41′41″N 3°30′15″W
- Country: Spain
- Autonomous community: Castile-La Mancha
- Province: Toledo
- Municipality: Tembleque

Area
  - Total: 269 km^{2} (104 sq mi)
- Elevation: 637 m (2,090 ft)

Population (2025-01-01)
  - Total: 1,992
  - Density: 7.41/km^{2} (19.2/sq mi)
- Time zone: UTC+1 (CET)
  - Summer (DST): UTC+2 (CEST)

Tembleque is a municipality located in the province of Toledo, Castile-La Mancha, Spain. According to the 2010 census (INE), the municipality had a population of 2 390 inhabitants, but it has since declined.

== History ==
The name is of Iberian origin. At that time there were a lot of villages with names ending in "que".

After the reconquest of Toledo, the village belonged to the Knights Hospitaller.

On the eve of the expulsion of Spain's Jews in 1492, Tembleque had a small Jewish community, remembered through the activities of the moneylender Mose Abenamias, who appears to have been the village's main source of credit. Several cases preserved in royal orders show how, after the expulsion, his promissory notes (written promises to repay debts) were sold to Christian residents.

=== Heraldry ===
The town has a coat of arms featuring three towers over a small mountain and a cannon.(see note^{1}) The cannon symbolises the town's historical link with the artillery.(see note^{2})

== Landmarks ==
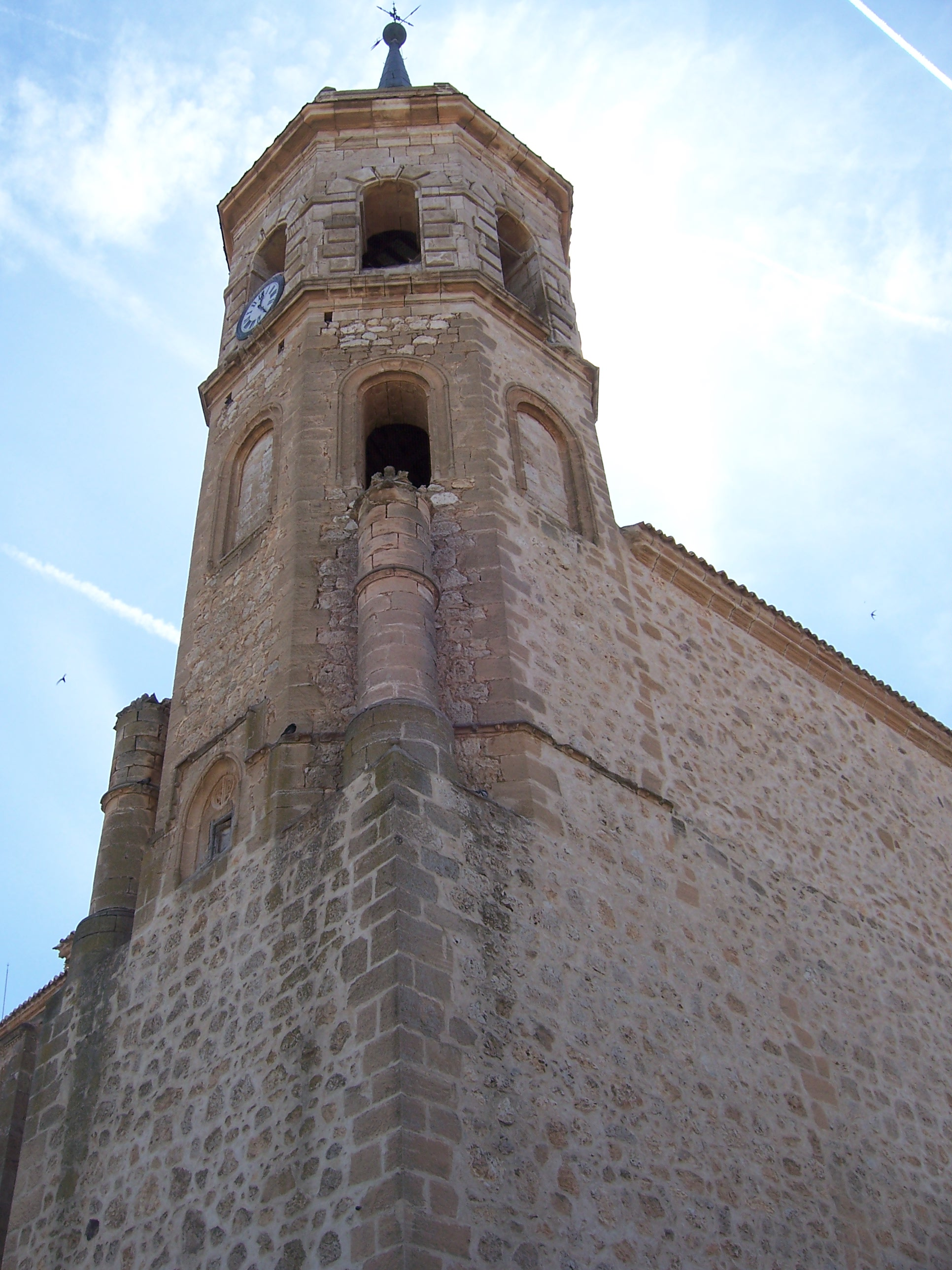

Buildings of interest include:

- the main square (Plaza Mayor)
- the church of the Assumption (Nuestra Señora de la Asunción), which dates from the 16th century.

== Famous inhabitants ==
Francisco de Tembleque gave his name to the Aqueduct of Padre Tembleque in Mexico. This structure is now a World Heritage Site.

- Nena Goodman (1910-1998), New York artist and philanthropist

== Notes ==
1.In heraldry "escutcheon" would be a more precise translation of the Spanish term escudo than "coat of arms".
2.The village supplied saltpetre for making gunpowder.
