= Consuegra =

- Municipality
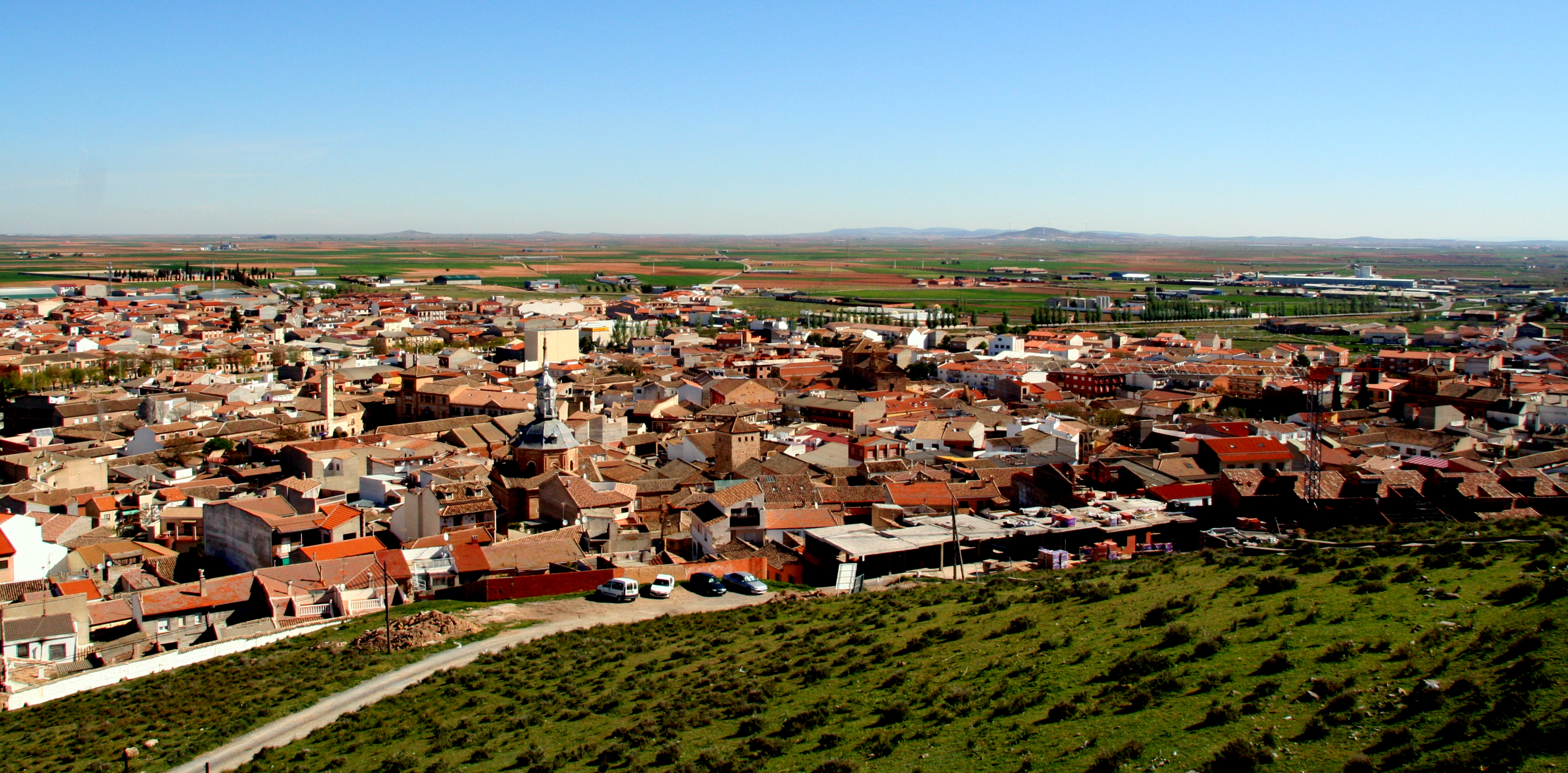

- Flag Coat of arms
- Interactive map of Consuegra
- Location within Castilla-La Mancha Location within Spain
- Coordinates: 39°27′43″N 3°36′23″W
- Country: Spain
- Autonomous community: Castilla–La Mancha
- Province: Toledo

Government
  - Mayor: Benigno Casas Gómez

Area
  - Total: 358 km^{2} (138 sq mi)
- Elevation: 704 m (2,310 ft)

Population (2025-01-01)
  - Total: 9,767
  - Density: 27.3/km^{2} (70.7/sq mi)
- Time zone: UTC+1 (CET)
  - Summer (DST): UTC+2 (CEST)
- Website: Official website

Consuegra is a municipality of Spain belonging to the province of Toledo, in the autonomous community of Castile-La Mancha. In 2018, the municipality had a population of 10,098 inhabitants. It is 80 km from Ciudad Real and 60 km from Toledo. Consuegra is located in La Mancha region, famous for its extensive dry plains, vineyards and historical constructions such as windmills.

The principal economy sector is agriculture. The industry is predominated by textile and wood. Tourism has become a new economical source in the 21st century. The castle and the windmills are Consuegra's most important monuments.

== Geography ==
Consuegra is located in the southeast of the province of Toledo, near the eastern fringes of the Montes de Toledo. Current-day housing developed near the Amarguillo river and the Cerro Calderico (a 828 m- hill rising circa 100 m above the course of the river), with the plains of La Mancha opening to the north, east and southeast. It lies on the CM-42 road route connecting Toledo and Tomelloso, close to the A-3 road route connecting central Spain and Andalusia.

Annual precipitation average in the area is below 400 mm and the climate features a summer drought typical of a mediterranean climate.

== History ==
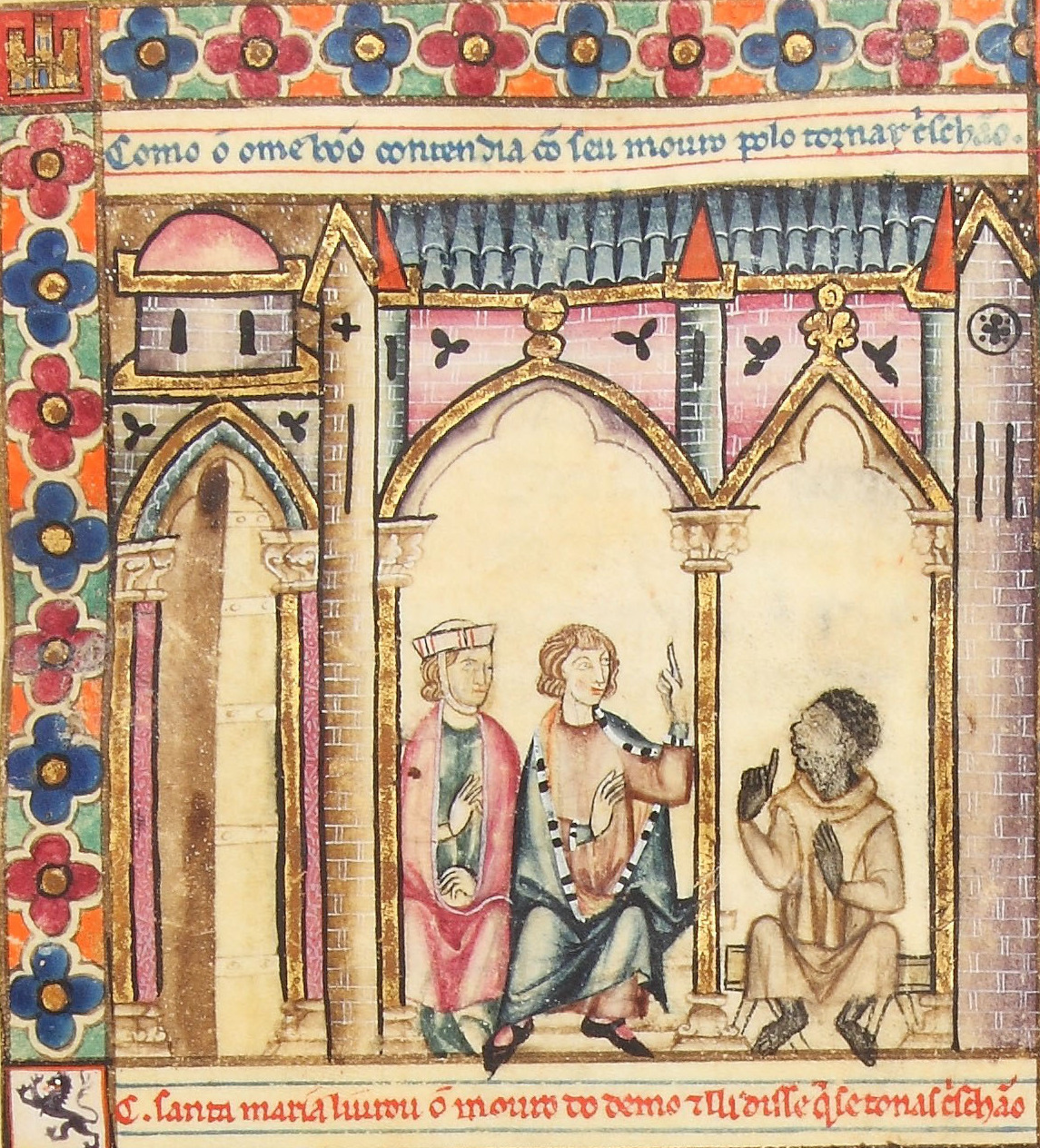
A Christian man and his Moorish servant discuss in Consuegra (Cantiga #192).

The urban origins lie on a pre-Roman hilltop settlement (oppidum) on the Cerro Calderico, identified as belonging to the indigenous Carpetani. Following Roman subjugation of the Carpetania, the population moved to the plain in between the northern slope of the Cerro Calderico and the Amarguillo river. Identified with the Roman city of Consabura, it was promoted to the status of municipium under the Flavian dynasty.

The Romans dammed the river Amarguillo upstream from Consuegra to regulate the water supply.

After the Arab conquest, the majority of the Hispanic and Visigothic population remained in the town. The castle dates from this period. After the reconquista of Toledo in 1085 by Alfonso VI of Leon, Consuegra came under Castilian rule. In 1097, Diego, the son of El Cid, was killed in the Battle of Consuegra. In this battle, the Castilian army was defeated by the Almoravids under the command of Yusuf ibn Tashfin, which temporarily brought Consuegra back under Islamic rule.

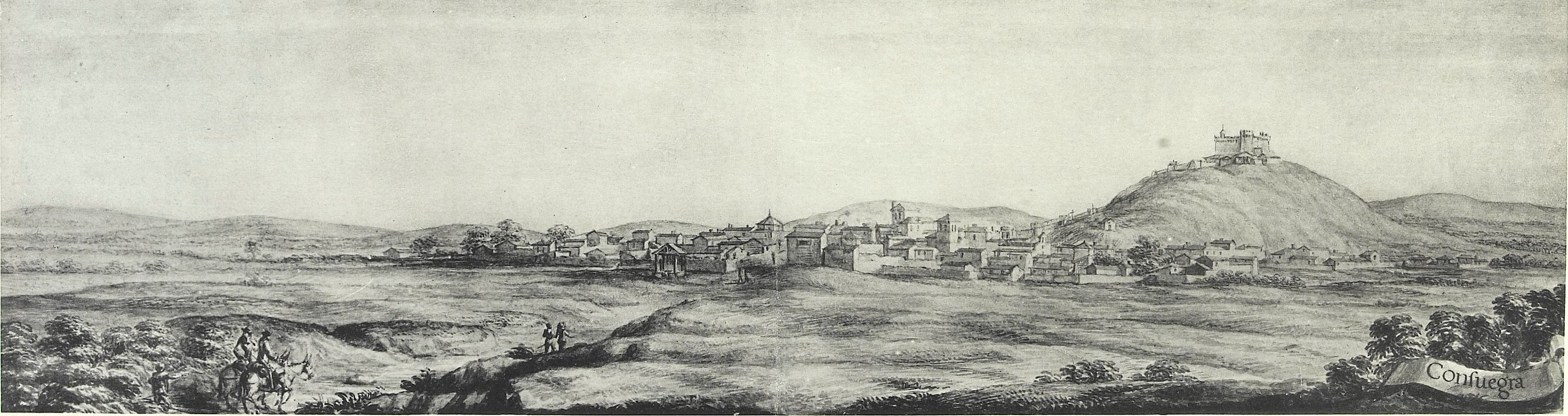
Consuegra circa 1668 as painted by Pier Maria Baldi.

The castle was once a stronghold of the Knights Hospitaller of the Order of St. John of Jerusalem, part of the order's dominion in the Campo de San Juan.

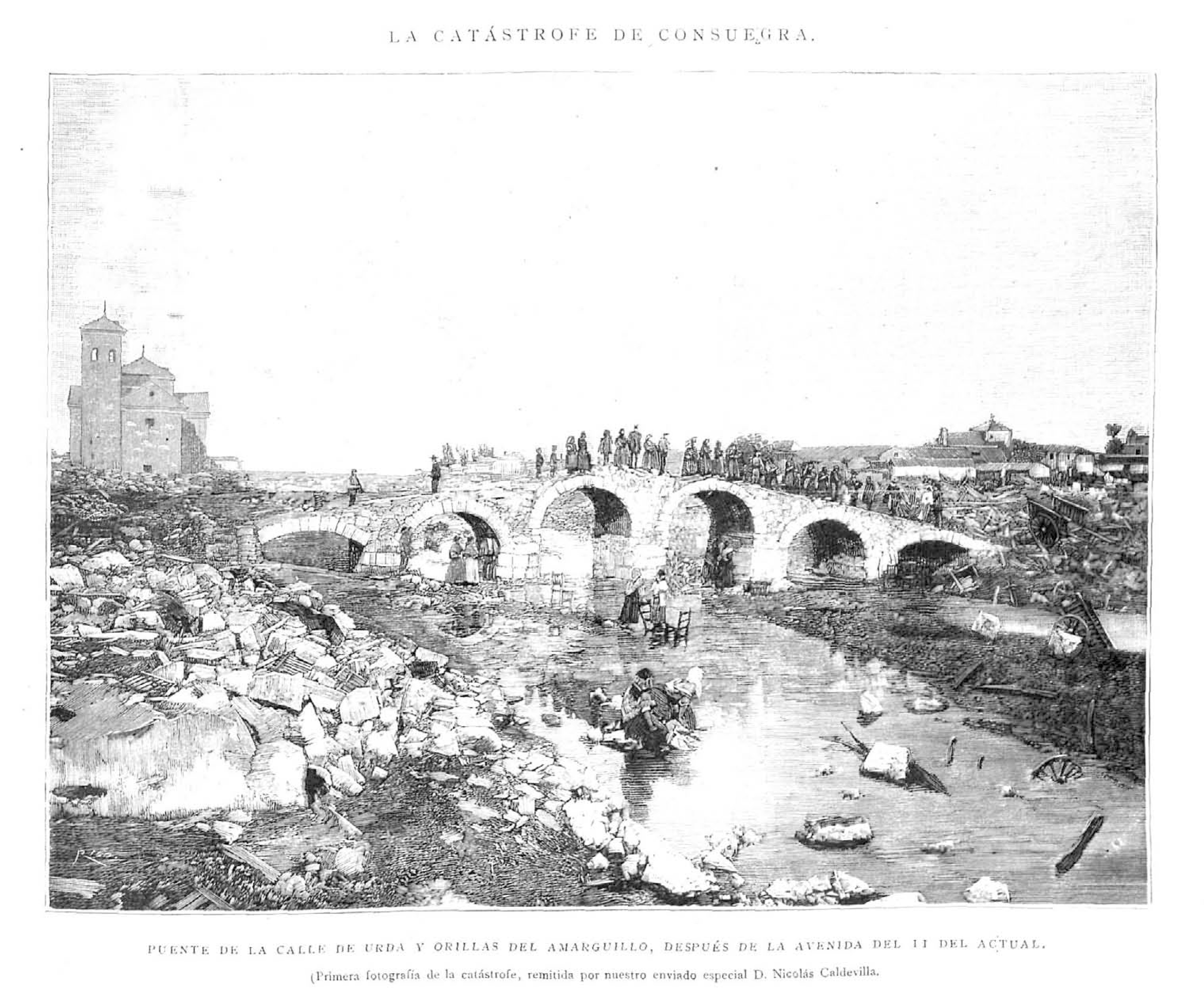
Aftermath of the 1891 flood

On 11 September 1891, a flood of the Amarguillo caused catastrophic damage to the town, and 359 deaths.

In 1976, Consuegra made news worldwide as the only municipality in Spain that had reported a majority "no" vote in the 1976 Spanish political reform referendum, with an official result reported of 2,909 votes against democratic reforms and only 2,371 in favor. Overall, 94.2% of Spanish voters had approved the changes. The reported results prompted an angry response from village residents who accused the town's leaders of fraud, and the provincial election board voted to annul the results.

== Main sights ==
=== Windmills ===
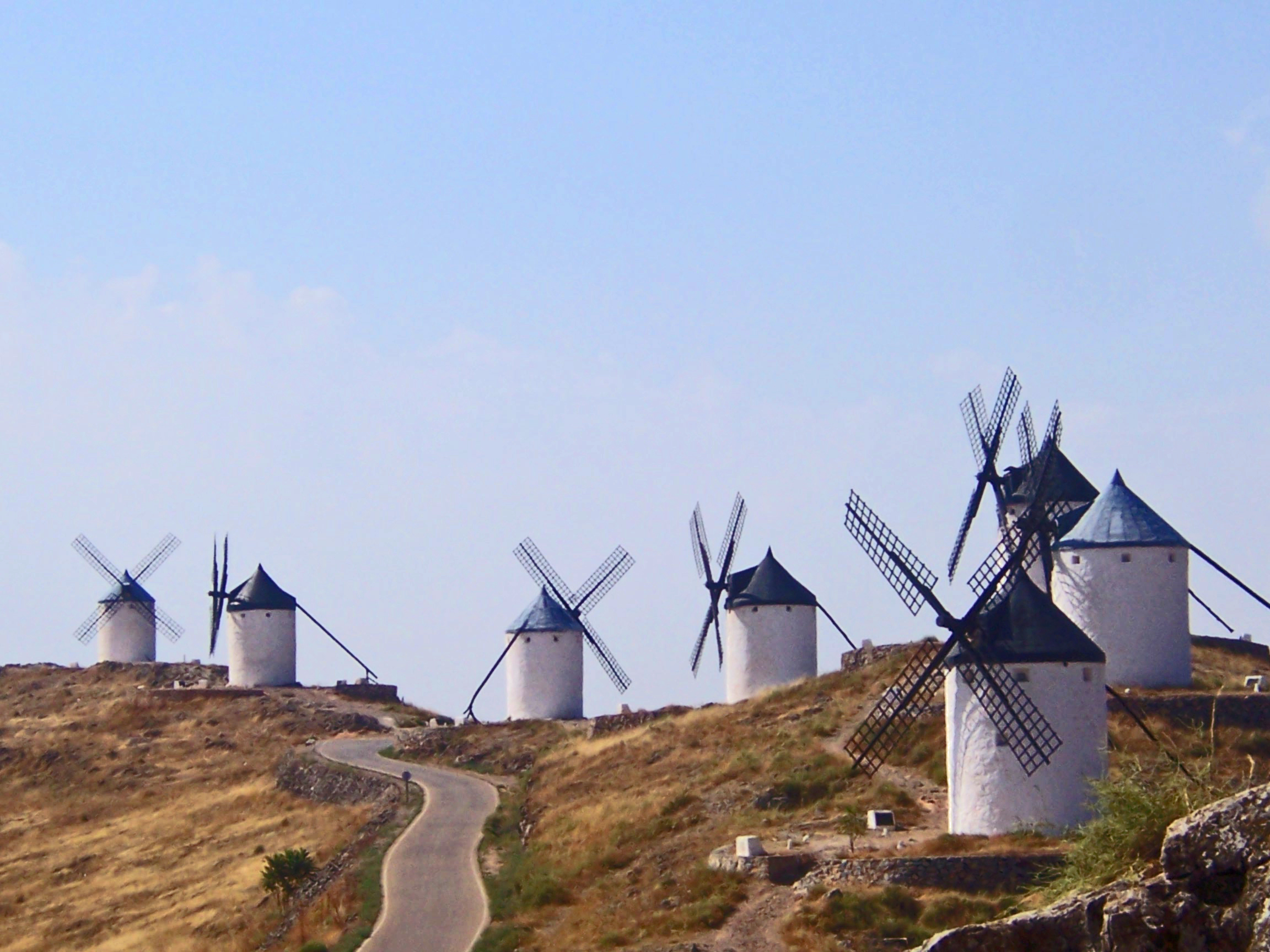
Windmills of Consuegra

Consuegra is famous for its windmills. These windmills became famous in the 17th century, when Don Quixote was first published and introduced the scene of Don Quixote fighting with the windmills.

The introduction of the windmills into the local region was made by a "Caballeros Sanjuanistas", who brought these machines that helped millers to grind wheat. The windmills were transmitted from fathers to sons for generations, and eventually stopped being used at the beginning of the 1980s.

The windmills usually consisted of two rooms or levels. Millers had to carry sacks of grains that could weigh 60 or 70 kilos to the top floor, they rotated the sails of the windmill as the top part of the windmill or dome was movable. Other important parts of the windmill are tunnel (also known as canal, through it the grain goes down), container (where the grain is stored), and pieces of woods for moving the sails

There were originally 13 windmills in Consuegra, but only 12 have been reconstructed. These windmills are all located on a small mountain range south of the town, known as Cerro Calderico, that also hosts Castle of La Muela.

Each windmill has a name, to differentiate one from another.

Names in 1963
La zorra; La tuerta; Mochilas; Vista alegre; Panza; Bolero; Santo domingo; Chispas; Rastrero; Por si pega; Bateria; Espartero; Blanco.
Names today
Sin nombre; Clavileño; Chispas; Espartero; Rucio; Cardeño; Caballero del verde gabán; Alcancia; Ruinas; Sancho; Mambrino; Bolero

=== Castle of Consuegra ===
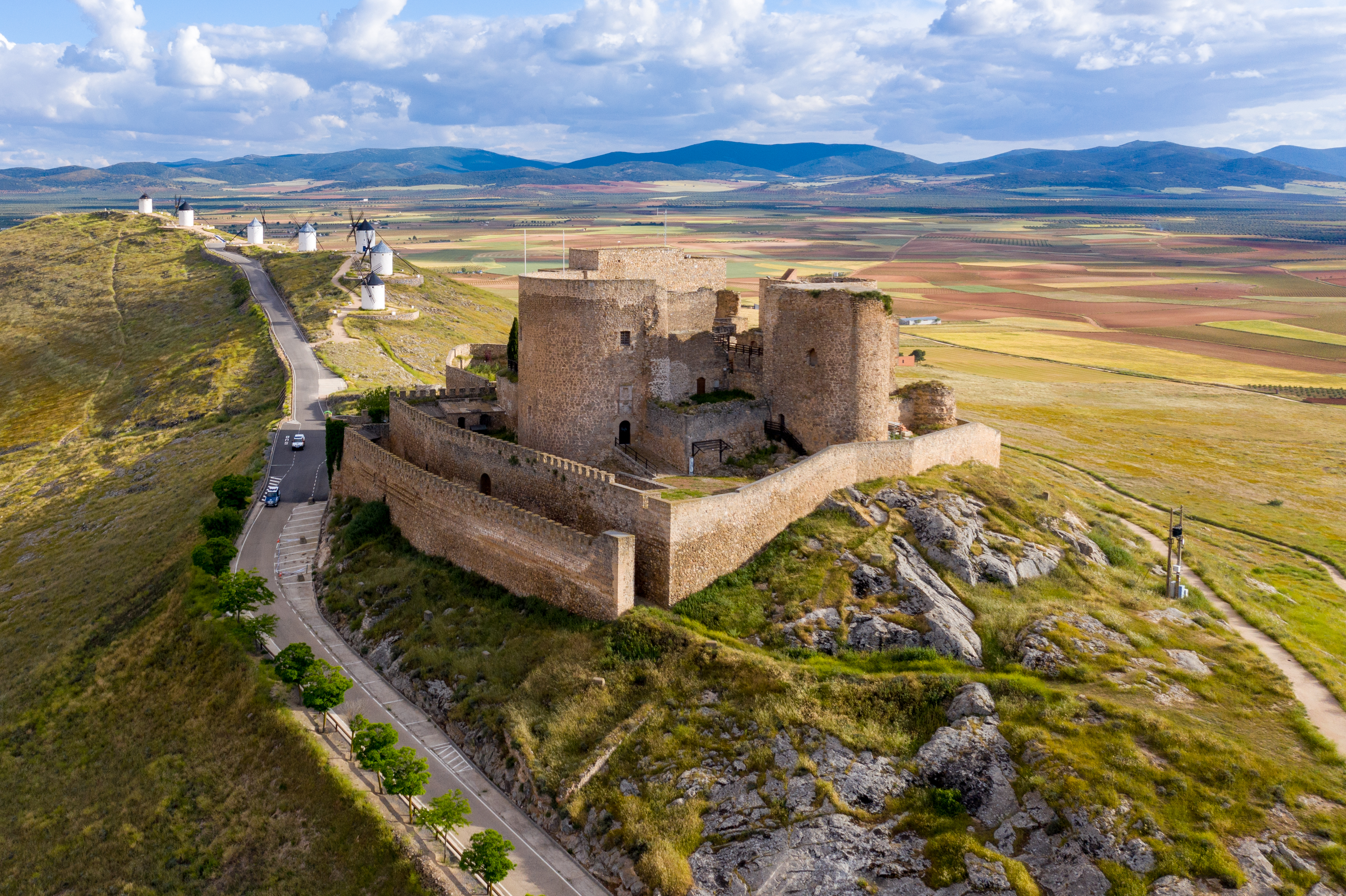
Castle of La Muela

The original fortress at the site was perhaps built by emperor Trajan, but historical records only recall that a fortress here was initially built by Almanzor. During the Reconquest, in times of Alfonso VIII to the Knights Hospitaller. In 1813 it was destroyed during the Peninsular War.

In 1962 the castle was ceded to the town hall and underwent a period of reconstruction. This received an impulse in 1985 with the creation of the School Workshop, whose activity continue today.

=== Town hall and major square ===
The town hall is in Renaissance style and it is located at the major square, called "Plaza de España". It was built on 1670. Joined to the townhall it is the "La torre del reloj". In this square is the building called "Los Corredores" (17th century), which is a typical structure of La Mancha and which was an old townhall.

== Crafts ==
The crafts are a tradition of "consuegra" noted for its quality and variety. The raw materials with these products are created normally are autochthonous, and are mainly from that region.

In the city can be found workshops of classically designed items, in which there are elaborate doors, items, and furniture for domestic use, such as chairs or bedrooms and two great workshops in stone.

== Festivals ==
The last October weekend includes the Rose of Saffron. This festival started in 1963. It is divided into several sections: the grain of wheat in Sancho's windmill, the choosing of a "Dulcinea" by the townsfolk, and a gastronomic competition. It was created in 1962 by D. Oscar Dignoes.

Some of its important celebrations are "San Antón", Easter or its own celebrations from 20–25 September, its more distinguish celebrations are "La Fiesta de La Rosa del Azafrán" and "Consuegra Medieval".

== Gastronomy ==
Its gastronomy is from “Machegos food or Toledo’s traditional food”, such as migas (made up by small pieces of bread with "chorizo", bacon, ham), gachas (made of flour, "chorizo" and more ingredients), and other types of food.

== Bibliography ==
- Muñoz Villarreal, José Joaquín (2005). "Consabura: de oppidum a municipio romano" (PDF). Hispania Antiqua (29). Valladolid: Ediciones Universidad de Valladolid: 107–150. ISSN 1130-0515.
- Palencia García, Juan Francisco (2014). "La asimilación de las sociedades prerromanas por Roma en la Meseta Sur de la Península Ibérica. Continuidad frente a cambio a partir del estudio de una ciudad romana: Consabvra (Consuegra, Toledo)" (PDF). Antesteria (3): 93–104. ISSN 2254-1683.
