= Works of Elizabeth Murray =

Paintings by Elizabeth Murray (1815–1882)

Elizabeth Murray (1815 – 8 December 1882), born Elizabeth Heaphy, was a British watercolourist. She primarily painted portraits and landscapes of the Canary Islands, where she lived for ten years. She was a member of the Royal Institute of Painters in Water Colours, and was one of the founders of The Society of Female Artists in London in 1857.

Murray's father was Thomas Heaphy, also a watercolour painter. She first learned to paint from him, and they travelled and painted together. She continued to travel and live across the world, and paint scenes and portraits from these places: in particular, Rome, Morocco, the Canary Islands (particularly Tenerife), and New England. She married Henry John Murray, a British consul whom she met when living in Morocco, and moved with him as he was assigned to the Canary Islands.

José Luis García Pérez has pointed out that it is difficult to know the exact dates Murray's paintings were created, and that because of her travels it is likely she sketched the initial drawings and then took more time to finish them. Many of the dates of her paintings refer to the year they were exhibited—when she arrived in a new place she tended to exhibit work from where she had previously been, so when she arrived in the Canary Islands she exhibited work with Greek and Moroccan themes, and when she arrived in Portland she exhibited her work related to Spain.

Murray created around 85 pieces that can be divided into three groups: portraits, which were the highlights of her artwork; general scenes; and landscapes.

Murray also published a monograph, Sixteen Years of an Artist's Life in Morocco, Spain, and the Canary Islands about her travels, in 1859. In 1865 she published The Modern System of Painting in Watercolour from the Living Model, a more technical explanation of watercolour painting.

== Selected paintings ==
=== Pifferari playing to the Virgin-Scene in Rome ===
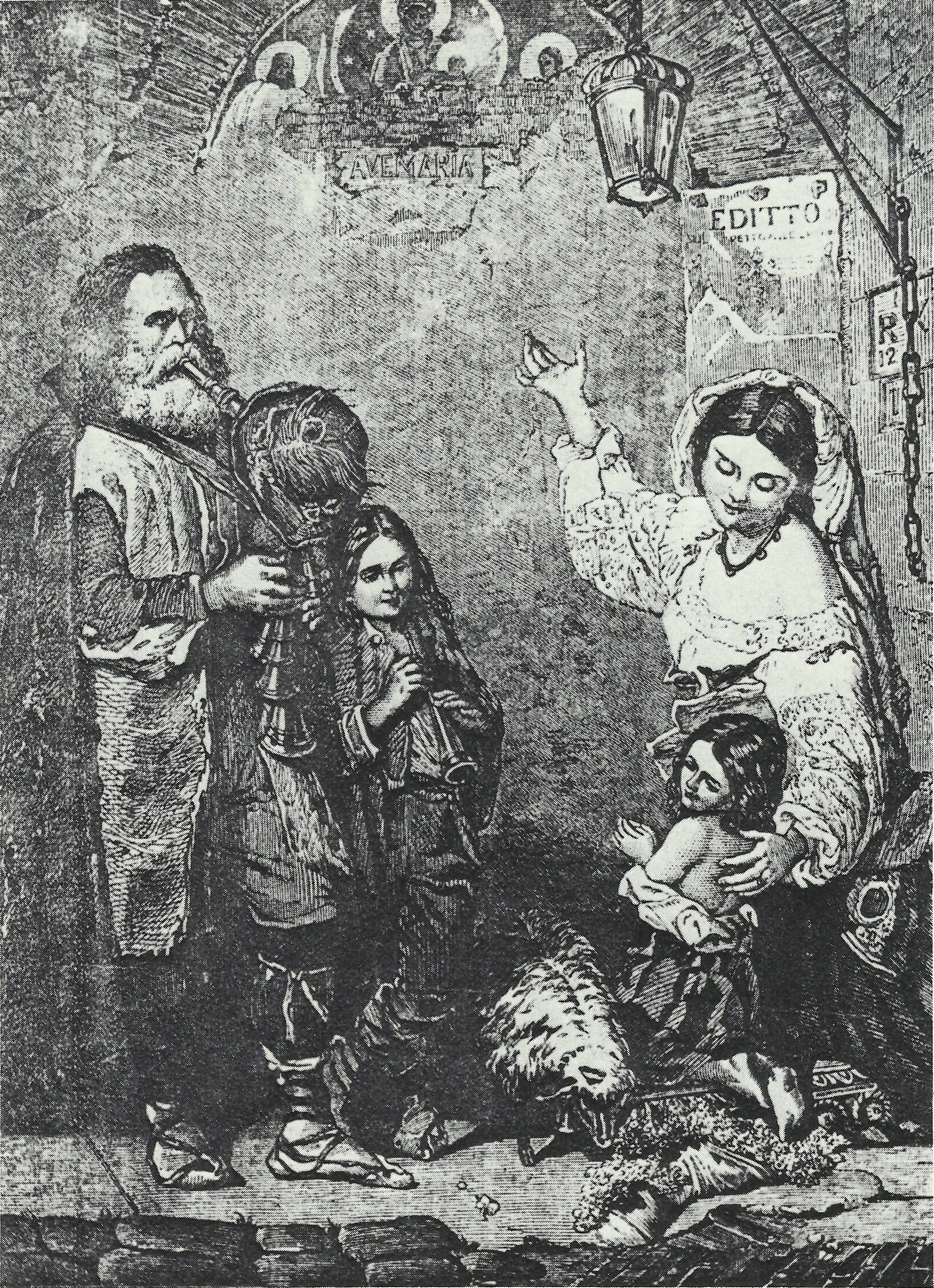
Black and white watercolour painting Pifferari playing to the Virgin-Scene in Rome

This painting depicts two fife players, an adult and child, and a mother with her son. The musicians are pifferari, peasants from Campania who play their instruments at Christmas in front of Marian images. The mother looks at her son with her right arm raised to point to the Virgin Mary and Baby Jesus, and with her left arm around the naked back of the child, who is kneeling before the image. Both groups are facing each other, with the musicians on the left and the family on the right. It is a simple layout with a predominance of vertical lines, closed at the top with a semicircle and at the bottom with a horizontal line.

It is an Italian scene, given the presence of the pifferari and the use of "Rome" in the title of the work. It emphasises the nature of Rome as the hub of Catholicism, which is why the Christogram I.H.S. is drawn on the back wall.

The work is undated, but it was reproduced in an edition of The Illustrated London News published on 26 March 1859.

=== The best in the market ===
This work depicts a market scene, possibly in Rome. In the centre of the painting is a table with several fruits placed on top of a newspaper. Three characters are in the painting: a man sitting on the right edge of the table, a saleswoman in the centre, and a child with his back to the left; the man and boy are wearing hats, and the woman is wearing a headscarf.

The painting is composed of a vertical axis in the centre, in this case created by the woman; on both sides, following the typical parallelism in Murray's works, are the man and child. The frame is closed at the top by a semicircular arch. This style is very similar to that of her father's, especially in regards to the setting.

This painting was reproduced in the same issue of The Illustrated London News that reproduced Pifferari playing to the Virgin-Scene in Rome, published on 26 March 1859.

=== Beggars at the church door at Rome ===
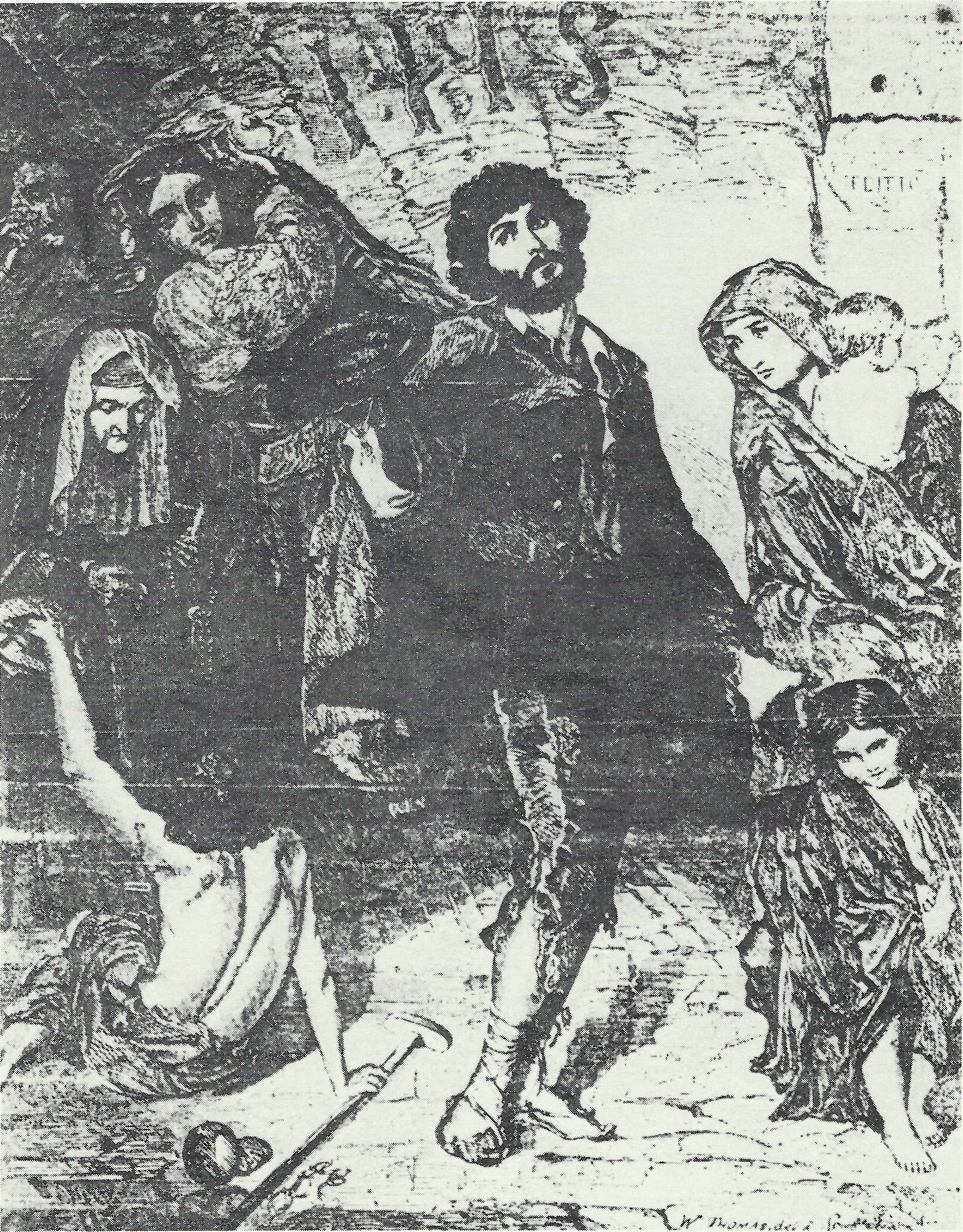
Black and white watercolour Beggars at the church door at Rome

Beggars at the church door at Rome depicts a varied group of beggars. In the background is the front door to a church, which features a prominent I.H.S. monogram in the centre and an edict on the right side. The main character in the scene is a tall man with curly black hair and expressive eyes who is extending his arm with a hat, to symbolise that he is asking for alms. To his left is a family, made up of a woman who is hugging a half-naked child wrapped in a cloak, and a barefoot girl also with a cloak who is sitting at the woman's feet. To the beggar's right is another group of people who are very different from the family: an old woman holding a rosary and looking compassionately at a half-naked man, and behind her a heavily-adorned Romani girl, whose depiction shows the Victorian delicacy with which Murray painted small details.

The watercolour demonstrate's Murrays admiration of Murillo, whose influence is visible in how Murray painted the injured young man using foreshortening, showing his back and hiding his face. The old woman's headdress is also reminiscent of Murillo's Dolarosa paintings.

Beggars at the church door at Rome is also composed around a vertical axis, in this case the man who is asking for alms; however, there is also a diagonal axis created by the Romani girl and the mother with her son. Another diagonal line is created by the young beggar on the ground, whose cane is parallel to one of his legs. This work is different from Murray's usual works because, although Murray was careful with the painting's composition, it was a collective portrait.

The watercolour was translated into a wood-engraving by William Luson Thomas which appeared in the Illustrated London News, in an issue published on 9 April 1859.

=== Church patronage ===
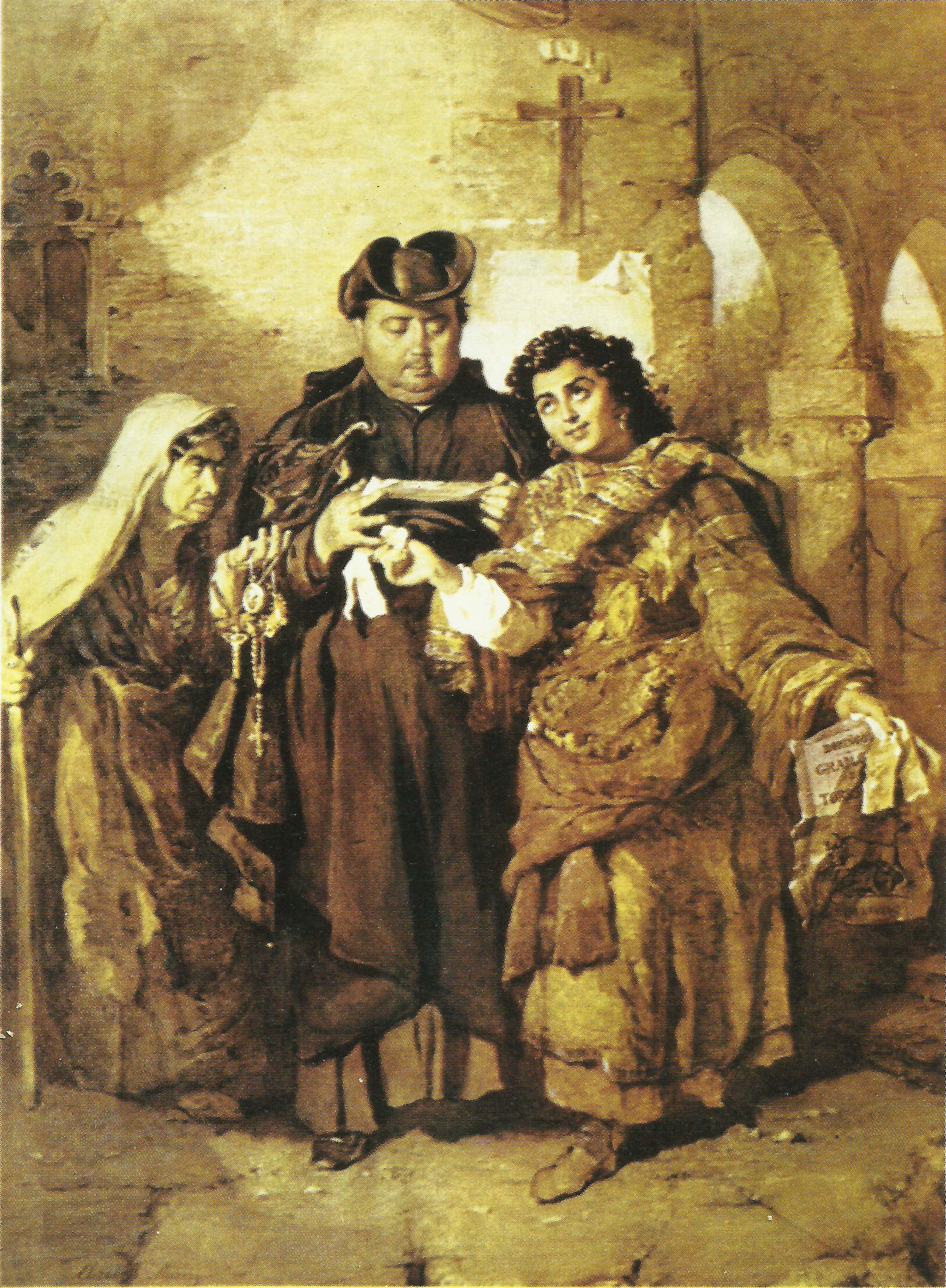
Church patronage

Church patronage depicts a group of three people: two women on the sides, one selling tickets for a bullfight and the other selling Christian relics, and in the centre a fat priest reading a book and ignoring the women. The girl selling tickets is holding a poster announcing the bullfight, which is equivalent to the edicts that Murray included in the Italian scenes she painted.

The composition of this painting is similar to her other works: the priest makes up a central vertical axis, and both women are parallel to it. The colour of the painting is soft in tone, although but this highlights the intensity of the chestnut in the ticket seller's dress and the blue and pink flowers in her hair.

=== Bust of Spanish lady in mantilla ===
In this painting, Murray paints the left profile of a slightly smiling woman looking to the right. She is wearing a black mantilla and holding an open fan in her left hand; there is a red carnation in her hair and her lips are painted the same colour.

The colours in the painting are yellows, reds, ochre, and chestnut. The painting has some similarities to the one she would later make of Solita Diston during her stay in Tenerife. It is also one of the last paintings she signed with her maiden name, Elizabeth Heaphy.

=== Marruecos ===
Marruecos (English: Morocco) is one of the few landscapes Murray painted. It is also the painting she used as a cover for the first volume of Sixteen Years of an Artist's Life in Morocco, Spain, and the Canary Islands.

It depicts a Moroccan landscape, with the horizon delimited by a row of buildings. It consists mainly of horizontal lines, only breaking with the vertical lines of palm trees on the hill. The painting uses chestnut, green, red, yellow, and ochre colours.

=== Odalisca ===
Odalisca (English: Odalisque) is a gouache painting of a Moorish girl wearing a traditional dress in front of a brown background. It's painted with soft purple and blue tones. Murray carefully paints the details of her subject, especially her jewellery and clothing. The painting is clearly influenced by Women of Algiers in their Apartment, an 1834 oil painting by French painter Eugène Delacroix.

Murray painted Odalisca during her stay in Morocco, and it is one her first works with Orientalist themes. It can be dated to around 1850, and it was exhibited at the Academia de Bellas Artes de Santa Cruz de Tenerife in 1851. The painting went on to be exhibited at the Museo Municipal de Bellas Artes de Santa Cruz de Tenerife in 1962 and at the Casino de Tenerife in 1977.

=== Vista de la Orotava y del Pico Teide ===
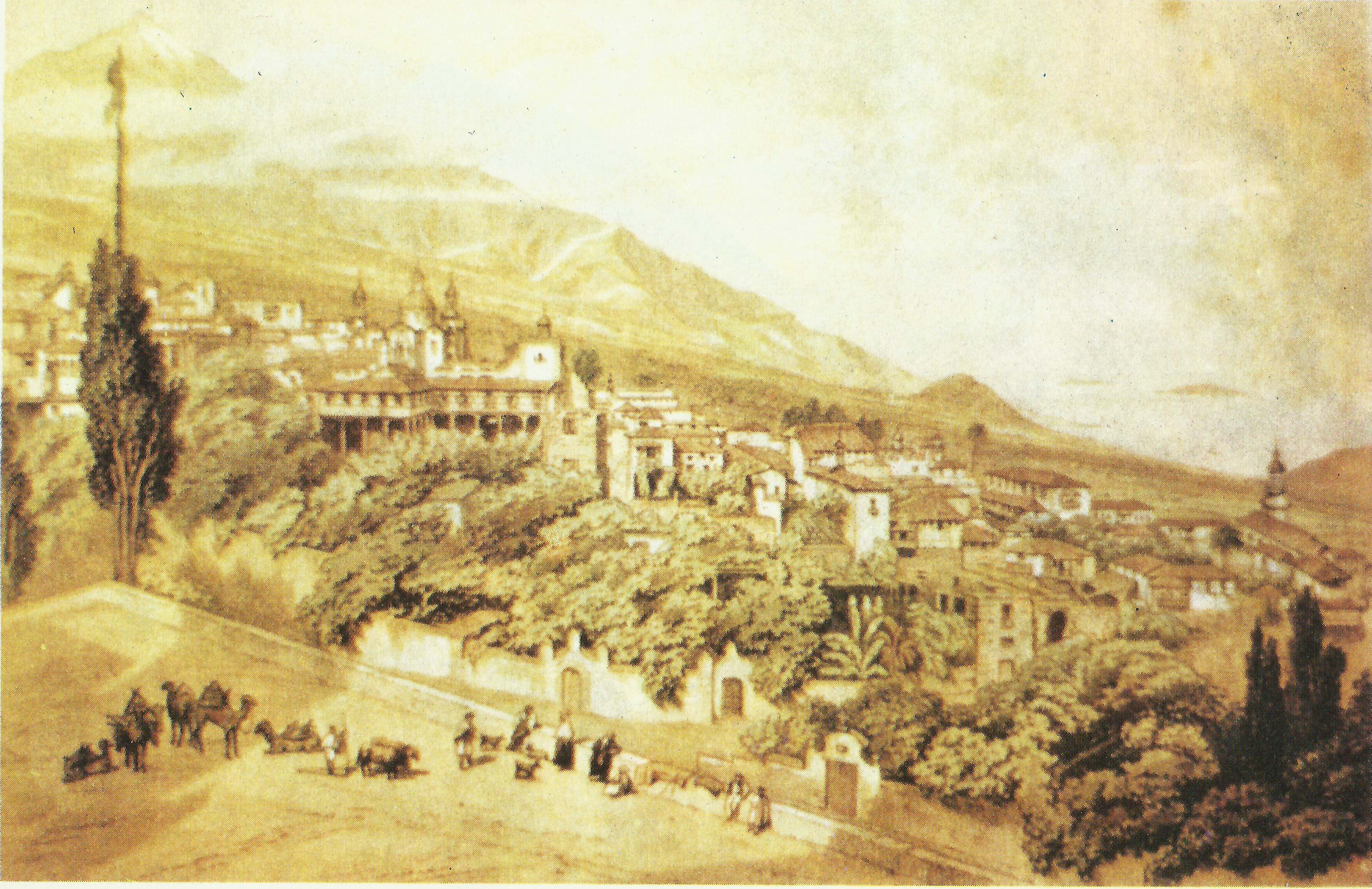
Vista de la Orotava y del Pico Teide

Vista de la Orotava y del Pico Teide (English: View of La Orotava and Teide Peak) is a landscape of the valley of La Orotava and of Teide, the peak that is visible in the background. It features a diagonal composition. The landscape mostly consists of the valley, although in the foreground there is a group of Canarians dressed in traditional clothing and accompanied by grazing animals and cargo. The colours of the painting are predominantly green, brown, and red.

The landscape is known primarily because of the engraving created by T. Picken for the second volume of Sixteen Years of an Artist's Life in Morocco, Spain, and the Canary Islands.

=== Alfred Diston ===
Murray's portrait of her friend Alfred Diston is very realistic, and captures his personality from his expression. He is placed facing forward, with his body tilted to the left. The painting predominantly uses chestnut and soft colours such as yellow in blue. It is clearly influenced by Murray's father, especially when compared to Thomas Heaphy's First of Viscount Beresford: both paintings feature very detailed facial expressions.

Alfred Diston was exhibited at the Museo Municipal in Santa Cruz de Tenerife during the exhibit La Acuarela en Tenerife (Watercolour in Tenerife). It was also reproduced in article in issue 1 of Tagoro, written by Andrés de Lorenzo Cáceres.

=== Soledad Diston y Orea ===
Soledad Diston y Orea is a portrait of Alfred Diston's daughter, Soledad (also known as Solita), facing forward and slightly to the left, surrounded by a border. Soledad holds a fan in her right hand, which is also heavily adorned. She is wearing a black mantilla, and a pink carnation on the left side of her head. The mantilla and carnation are two typical Hispanic elements that enhance the romantic spirit of the time. The colours in the painting are chestnut, yellow, black, and pink. It resembles Murray's earlier work, Bust of Spanish Lady in Mantilla.

It was exhibited in May 1962 in the Museo Municipal in Santa Cruz de Tenerife.

=== Doña Julia Bartlett y de Tarríus ===
This painting portrays Julia Bartlett y de Tarríus, the daughter of British consul Richard Bartlett who was succeeded by Murray's husband after Bartlett's death in 1849. Julia is portrayed tilted to the left, in fine strokes and extreme detail, especially in the lace and in the jewellery and the rose in the centre of the mantle. The painting's colours are primarily black, pink, red, and white.

This may have been one of Murray's last paintings in the Canary Islands, since it is dated 1860. By 1859, she had earned the animosity of Canarian society and media, although they continued to recognise her skill as a painter.

Doña Julia Bartlett y de Tarríus was exhibited in Santa Cruz de Tenerife in 1962 in the La Acuarela en Tenerife (Watercolour in Tenerife) exhibit. There is also a reproduction in the Nobles de Canarias by Fernández de Bethencourt.

=== Two little monkeys ===
The Blind Girl by John Everett Millais, 1856

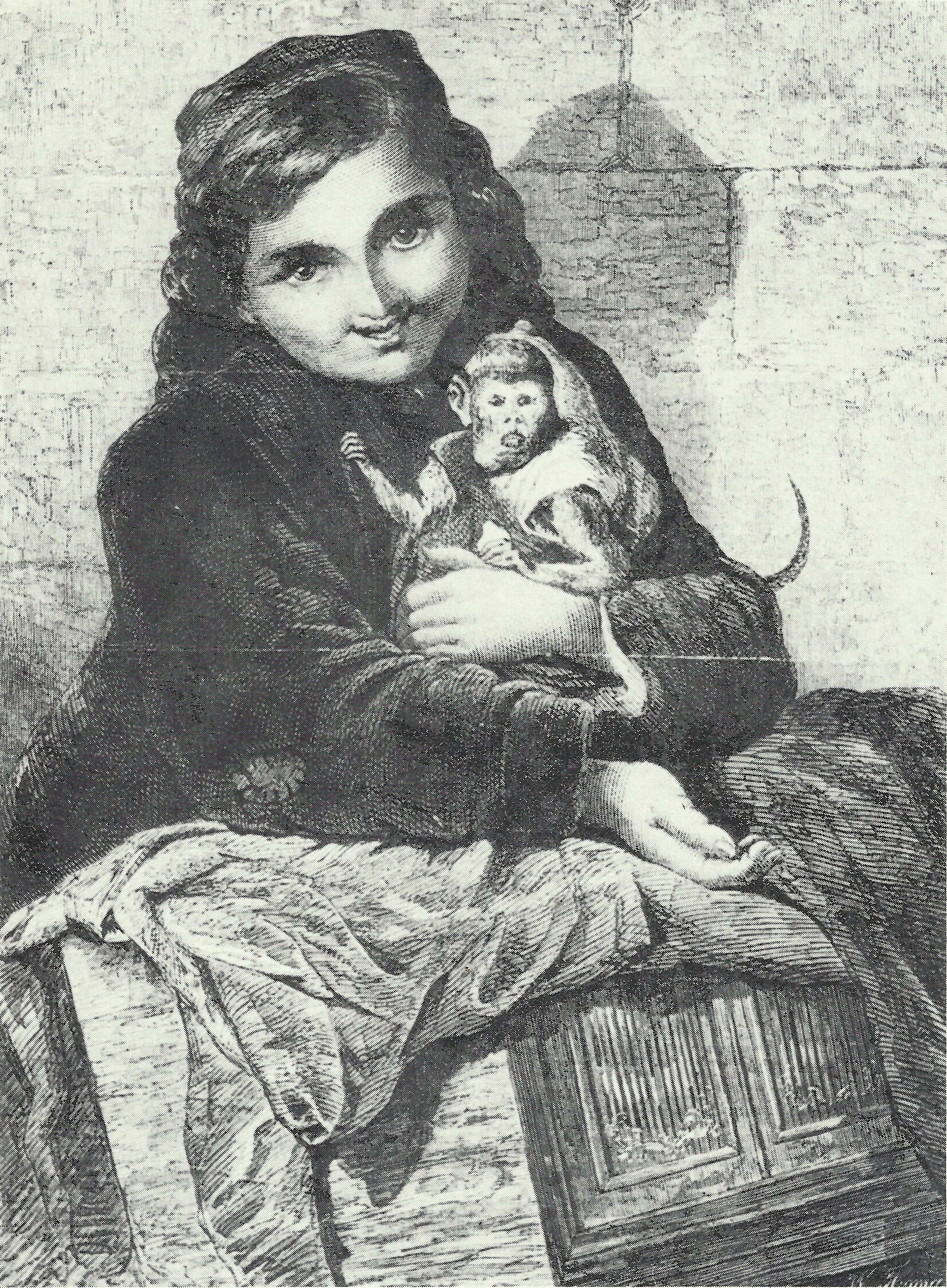
Two Little Monkeys by Elizabeth Murray, 1861

In this watercolour, Murray paints a Savoyard girl with a little monkey. The depiction of the monkey is a clear Victorian influence, given the love of monkeys, which were painted by many artists of that time. The young woman looks sickly, and holds the small animal in her hands. The painting includes some new characteristics for Murray: representations of truth, vivacity, and vigor; elements that are similar to other English paintings of the time, such as The Blind Girl by John Everett Millais.

Her painting was reproduced by the wood-engraver William Luson Thomas in the Illustrated London News on 30 March 1861.

=== The cheat detected ===
A group of four men are playing cards while two cheat through a priest, who watches the decks of the other players. One of the players is partly crouched, trying to light a cigarette that a young girl with black eyes holds to his lips. Behind the group is a woman who has noticed the cheating and is trying to warn the other players. The faces in this painting are very expressive. It was published in the U.S. newspaper Portland Daily Press on 20 February 1866.

=== Dotty Dimple ===
This painting depicts a young peasant girl, probably between the ages of ten and twelve, who Murray met when visiting the White Mountains. The girl has blue eyes and "rustic beauty", and is wearing a hat with blue and red wildflowers. She is offering grapes from a plate with her right hand, and her left hand is touching her throat. In the background is a mountainous landscape, with a wooden house with two active chimneys on the right. The watercolour was so well liked in America that it was distributed for several years as a Christmas postcard.

=== The Spanish balcony ===
This watercolour shows two women on a balcony, one standing and the other seated, and on both sides "typical Moorish towers". The seated woman wears a black mantilla and holds a half-open fan; the standing woman is wearing a blue suit and gold jewellery. It was exhibited during Murray's stay in Portland and, although it attracted public attention (especially for its olive and tar colours), art critics from the Portland Daily News pointed out some flaws including Murray's way of painting hands, which they described as long and sloppy.

== List of paintings ==
Title	Translated title	Date	Technique	Location	Notes	Image
Una contadina	A peasant	1834	Watercolour	Unknown	Exhibited at the Royal Academy around the date listed	
Portrait of a lady		1838	Watercolour	Unknown	Exhibited at the Royal Academy around the date listed	
Mrs. Lawrie and child		1838	Watercolour	Unknown	Exhibited at the Royal Academy around the date listed	
Rosaline. "She'll not be hit, etc."		1838	Watercolour	Unknown	Exhibited at the Royal Academy around the date listed	
Rev. B. Reofey		1838	Watercolour	Unknown	Exhibited at the Royal Academy around the date listed	
Miss Kerrison		1840	Watercolour	Unknown		
Portraits of the children of Rev. F. Ayckbirne		1842	Watercolour	Unknown		
Portraits of a lady and her children		1842	Watercolour	Unknown	Exhibited at the Royal Academy around the date listed	
Mrs. Hall and children		1842	Watercolour	Unknown		
Mr. and Mrs. Wansey		1843	Watercolour	Unknown		
General de la Rue	General of the Street	1846	Watercolour	Unknown		
Portrait of Ben-Abon-Governor of Tonquin (Tangiers)		1846	Watercolour	Unknown	Exhibited at the Royal Academy around the date listed	
A Spanish nurse and waterman		1847	Watercolour	Unknown		
His Majesty Otho I, King of Greece		1847	Watercolour	Unknown	Exhibited at the Royal Academy around the date listed	
Miss Macdonald		1847	Watercolour	Unknown		
Portraits of Son of Abd-ul-Medjeed, Sultan of Turkey		1847	Watercolour	Unknown		
Mrs. Barnard		1847	Watercolour	Unknown		
Marruecos	Morocco	1849	Watercolour	Unknown	Reproduced in the first volume of her monograph Sixteen Years of an Artist's Life in Morocco, Spain, and the Canary Islands	
Cuadro de costumbres andaluzas	Painting of Andalusian customs	1850	Watercolour	Unknown		
Retrato del rey de Grecia	Portrait of the King of Greece	1850	Watercolour	Unknown	Exhibited at the Royal Academy around the date listed	
Bust of Spanish lady in mantilla		c. 1850	Watercolour: 31 cm × 21 cm (12.2 in × 8.3 in)	Victoria and Albert Museum	Signed in the lower right corner as "Elizabeth Heaphy", her unmarried name	
Griegos descansado	Greeks resting	1851	Watercolour	Unknown		
Princesa de Persia	Princess of Persia	1851	Watercolour	Unknown		
Retrato del General conde de la Rue		1851	Watercolour	Unknown		
San Antonio		1851	Gouache	Unknown	Copy of The vision of San Antonio de Padua by Bartolomé Esteban Murillo	
Retrato	Portrait	1851	Gouache	Unknown		
Retrato del General Garibaldi	Portrait of General Garibaldi	1851	Watercolour	Unknown		
Retrato del último gobernador de Tánger	Portrait of the last governor of Tangier	1851	Watercolour	Unknown		
Sr. Colerri, Ministro del Rey de Grecia	Mr. Colerri, Minister to the King of Greece	1851	Watercolour	Unknown		
Empleado del Embajador Inglés en Constantinopla	Employee of the English ambassador in Constantinople	1851	Watercolour	Unknown		
Un mendigo de Cádiz	A beggar in Cádiz	1851	Watercolour	Unknown		
Retrato a la aguada	Gouache portrait	1851	Gouache	Unknown	Exhibited at the Academia de Bellas Artes de Santa Cruz de Tenerife around the date listed	
Un cheriff moro, a la aguada	A Moorish sheriff, with gouache	1851	Gouache	Unknown		
Mujer e hija del camarero del Rey de Grecia	Woman and daughter of the waiter to the King of Greece	1851	Watercolour	Unknown		
Hijo del Sultán de Turquía	Son of the Sultan of Turkey	1851	Watercolour	Unknown		
Odalisca	Odalisque	1851	Gouache	Private collection of Facundo. F. Fierro (Santa Cruz de Tenerife)	It is signed in the lower left corner with the initials JBF, which refer to Juan B. Fierro y Van de Walle Fierro y Valcárcel. His grandson, the current owner, states the initials were added by his grandfather and confirms that the painting is by Elizabeth Murray.	
Vista de la Orotava y del Pico Teide	View of La Orotava and Teide Peak	c. 1851	Watercolour	Unknown	Reproduced in the first volume of her monograph Sixteen Years of an Artist's Life in Morocco, Spain, and the Canary Islands	
Francisco Montes		1851	Gouache	Unknown		
Un Rabbin, judío de Tanger	A rabbi, jew of Tangier	1851	Watercolour	Unknown	Exhibited at the Academia de Bellas Artes de Santa Cruz de Tenerife around the date listed	
Reina de Grecia	Queen of Greece	1851	Watercolour	Unknown		
Retrato	Portrait	1851	Watercolour	Unknown		
Copia del San Antonio de Murillo	Copy of Murillo's San Antonio	1853	Watercolour	Unknown	Copy of The vision of San Antonio de Padua by Bartolomé Esteban Murillo	
Una bolera	A bowling alley	1853	Watercolour	Unknown	Exhibited at the Academia de Bellas Artes de Santa Cruz de Tenerife around the date listed	
Alfred Diston		1854	Watercolour	Private collection (San Cristóbal de La Laguna)	Signed in the lower right as "Elizabeth Murray". Exhibited in May 1962 at the Museo Municipal de Bellas Artes de Santa Cruz de Tenerife as a part of the exhibit La Acuarela en Tenerife (Watercolour in Tenerife).	
Doña Soledad Diston y Orea	Miss Soledad Diston y Orea	1854	Watercolour	Private collection (San Cristóbal de La Laguna)	Signed in the lower right as "Elizabeth Murray". Exhibited in May 1962 at the Museo Municipal de Bellas Artes de Santa Cruz de Tenerife as a part of the exhibit La Acuarela en Tenerife (Watercolour in Tenerife).	
Vista de la Orotava	View of La Orotava	1855	Watercolour	Unknown		
Vista de la ciudad de Las Palmas	View of the city of Las Palmas	1855	Watercolour	Unknown	Exhibited at the Academia de Bellas Artes de Santa Cruz de Tenerife around the date listed	
Casa antigua de Icod	Icod's old house	1857	Watercolour	Unknown		
Joven isleña en oración	Young islander in prayer	1857	Watercolour	Unknown		
Dácila		1857	Watercolour	Unknown		
Flor de un dia	A day's flowers	1857	Watercolour	Unknown		
Pifferari playing to the Virgin-Scene in Rome		1859	Watercolour	Unknown	Reproduced in the 26 March 1859 issue of the Illustrated London News. Part of an exhibit by the Society of Female Artists. The image shown is a black and white version of the original work.	
The best in the market		1859	Watercolour	Unknown	Signed in the lower left corner as "EM". Reproduced in the Illustrated London News. Part of an exhibit by The Society of Female Artists.	
Beggars in the church door at Rome		1859	Watercolour	Unknown	Reproduced in the 9 April 1859 issue of the Illustrated London News in a wood-engraving by William Luson Thomas. Part of an exhibit by the Institution of Fine Arts. The image shown is a black and white version of the original work.	
The Cheat Detected		c. 1860	Watercolor		Present on the site of Maine History Online.	
Church patronage		1860	Oil: 88.9 cm × 65.4 cm (35.0 in × 25.7 in)	V&A Museum of Childhood (Bethnal Green, London)	Signed in the lower left corner with "Elizabeth Murray". This painting was in the Victoria and Albert Museum until 1977, when it was moved to the V&A Museum of Childhood in Bethnal Green.	
Doña Julia Bartlett y de Tarríus	Miss Julia Bartlett y de Tarríus	1860	Watercolour	Private collection (San Cristóbal de La Laguna)	Signed in the lower left as "Elizabeth Murray". Exhibited in May 1962 at the Museo Municipal de Bellas Artes de Santa Cruz de Tenerife as a part of the exhibit La Acuarela en Tenerife (Watercolour in Tenerife).	
Two little monkeys		1861	Watercolour	Unknown	Reproduced in the 30 March 1861 issue of The Illustrated London News in an engraving by William Thomas. Part of an exhibit by The Society of Female Artists. The image shown is a black and white version of the original work.	
The cheat detected		1866	Watercolour	Unknown	Reproduced in the 20 February issue of the Portland Daily Press.	
Dotty Dimple		1869	Watercolour	Essj. Collection	Signed in the lower left corner as "Eliz. Murray". Due to its strong reception in America, it was for some time circulated as a Christmas postcard. This image is a chromolithographic print by Williams & Everett.	
The old story in Spain		1870	Watercolour	Unknown		
Dalmatian peasant		1871	Watercolour	Unknown		
The Spanish balcony		1871	Watercolour	Hale's Gallery (Portland, Maine)	A simple painting that drew public attention during its exhibition because of its colours. However, the Portland Daily News criticises several failures: the long, stubby hands of the two women, among others.	
The eleventh hour		1871	Watercolour	Unknown		
The Gipsy Queen		1872	Watercolour	Unknown		
The Greek betrothal		1873	Watercolour	Unknown		
The white rose		1875	Watercolour	Unknown		
Spanish lovers lighting cigarettes		1875	Oil	Unknown		
Music in Morocco		1875	Watercolour	Unknown		
A Morish saint		1878	Watercolour	Unknown		
