= Heaphy =

Heaphy may refer to:

- Heaphy (surname), several people
- Heaphy River, a river in New Zealand
- Heaphy Spur, a ridge in Victoria Land, Antarctica
- Heaphy Tin Man, a public art sculpture in New York, United States
- Heaphy Track, hiking and tramping track in the West Coast, New Zealand
