= Heaphy (surname) =

Heaphy is a last name. Notable people with this last name include:

- Alan Heaphy, Australian motorsport team manager
- Bill Heaphy (1888-1914), Australian rules football player
- Charles Heaphy (1821–1881), New Zealand explorer, son of Thomas Heaphy
- Chris Heaphy (born 1965), New Zealand artist
- Sean Heaphy, drummer for the British band Scarlet Party
- Shawn Heaphy (born 1968), Canadian ice hockey player
- Timothy J. Heaphy (born 1964), American attorney and law professor
- Thomas Heaphy (1775–1835), English water-colour painter
- Thomas Frank Heaphy (1813-1873), English painter of miniatures, son of Thomas Heaphy

Middle name

- John Heaphy Fellowes (1932–2010), US Navy officer
- Raymond (Ray) John Heaphy Beverton, better known as Ray Beverton (1922–1995), British fisheries scientist
