= Alfred Diston =

British painter (1793–1861)

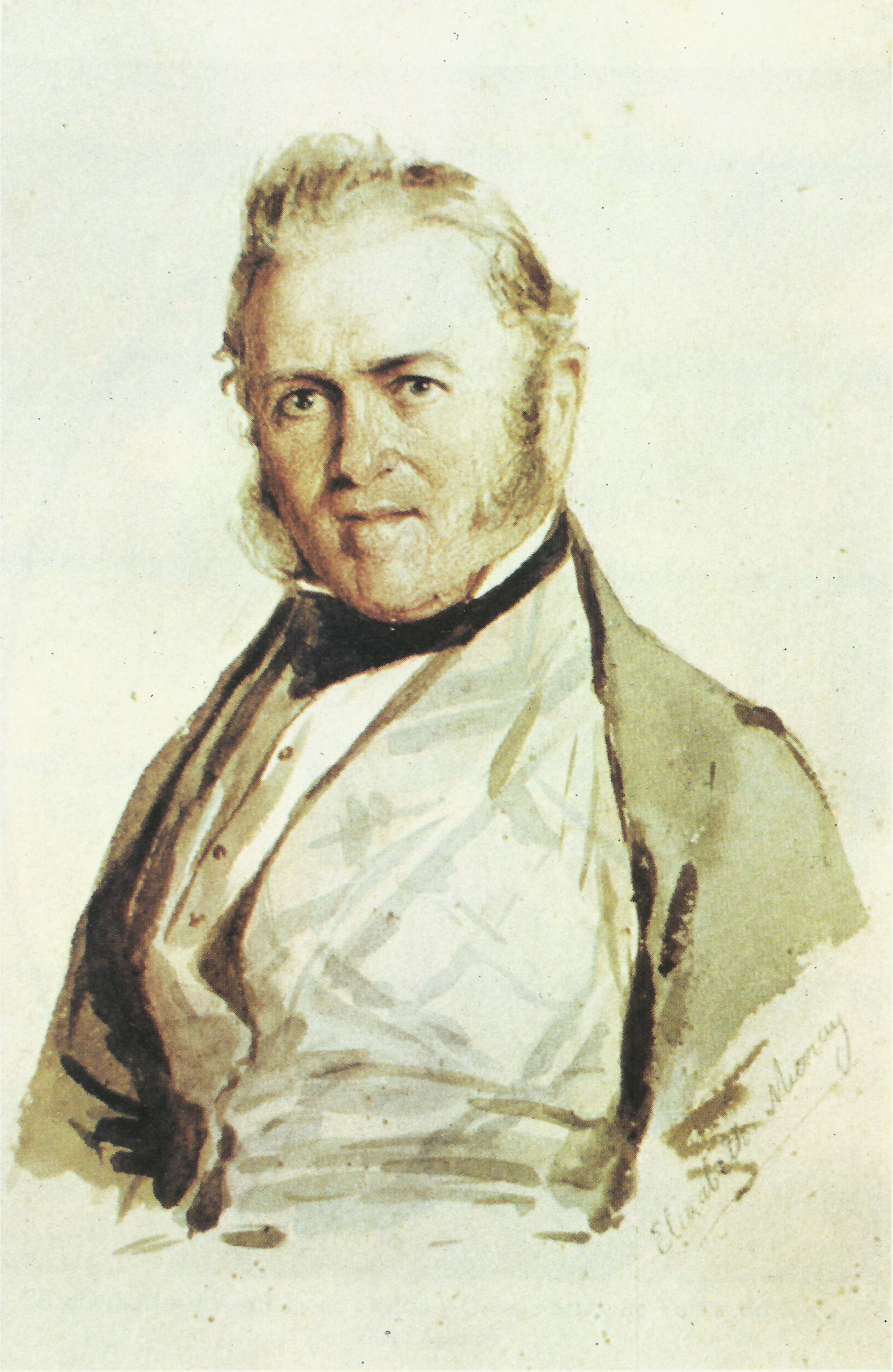
- Watercolour of Alfred Diston made by Elizabeth Murray in 1854.
- Born: 8 February 1793; Lowestoft, England
- Died: 2 April 1861 (aged 68); Port Orotava, (now Puerto de la Cruz), Tenerife, Spain
- Other name: Alfredo Diston
- Occupations: merchant, painter and ethnographer

Alfred Diston (Lowestoft, County of Suffolk, England, 8 February 1793; Puerto Orotava, Tenerife, 2 April 1861) was a British merchant and writer on a wide variety of subjects who lived in Puerto de la Cruz (former Puerto Orotava), Tenerife, between 1810 and 1861.

His illustrated manuscripts, his notebooks, and his watercolours and drawings represent a valuable documentary source to learn about many aspects of the society and the natural environment of Tenerife and the rest of the Canary Islands during the first half of the 19th century.

His relevance to the culture of the Canary Islands lies in the fact that he contributed in many disciplines, especially in those related to the knowledge and study of Canary Islands’ traditional clothing and customs of the time.

His major role in the introduction of the Cavendish banana in the Canary Islands was also very significant, and some of its cultivars are known today as “plátano de Canarias” (Canary Islands banana). The expansion of its cultivation throughout the islands and its export to England from 1870 to 1878 had an enormous impact on the economy of the Canary Islands for more than a century until the consolidation of mass tourism.

== Biography ==
Alfred Diston was born in 1793 in Lowestoft, an important fishing port and Great Britain's easternmost point, to a seafaring family.

In 1810, at the age of 17, Alfred Diston arrives at Puerto de La Orotava after being hired by the British firm Pasley, Little & Co., a company that exported wine from the Canary Islands.

Since then, he lived in Puerto de La Orotava for 51 years until he died in 1861.

Diston was characterized by having a multifaceted curiosity (ethnography, history, botany, geology, meteorology...), by his taste for travelling and by his observation skills, which is reflected in his meticulous drawings, his calligraphy and his numerous notebooks with annotations of all sorts.

In 1836, he marries Soledad Orea y Luna according to Catholic rites. Soledad, who was born in Cádiz in 1810, bore him four children. This marriage was likely the reason why Diston ends up settling in the Canaries and remains in Puerto de La Orotava until his death at the age of 65. José Agustín Álvarez Rixo, in his Anales del Puerto de la Cruz de La Orotava (Annals of Puerto de la Cruz de La Orotava) of 3 April 1861, informed about Diston's sudden passing the night before:

1861. 3 April. At eight o’clock in the evening, whilst playing checkers with his wife, Mr Alfred Diston, Protestant English who had been living among us since 1810, dies suddenly [...].

He was buried in the Protestant cemetery of Puerto de La Orotava.

=== Merchant ===
At the age of 17, Diston arrives at Puerto de La Orotava as an employee of Pasley, Little & Co., a firm that exports whine from the Canary Islands. His main task was to receive every merchant and traveller that arrived at Tenerife referred to the firm, accompanying them and introducing them to the island's society.

In 1774, John Pasley, British consul in Tenerife (1765-1769), requested the presence and assistance of his nephew, the Scotsman Sir Archibald Little, founding the trading house Pasley, Little & Co., which became the most important Canarian wine exporting firm during the first third of the 19th century.

A few years after his arrival, Diston was appointed administrator and, later, branch office manager until he finally became a senior partner.

=== Ethnographer ===
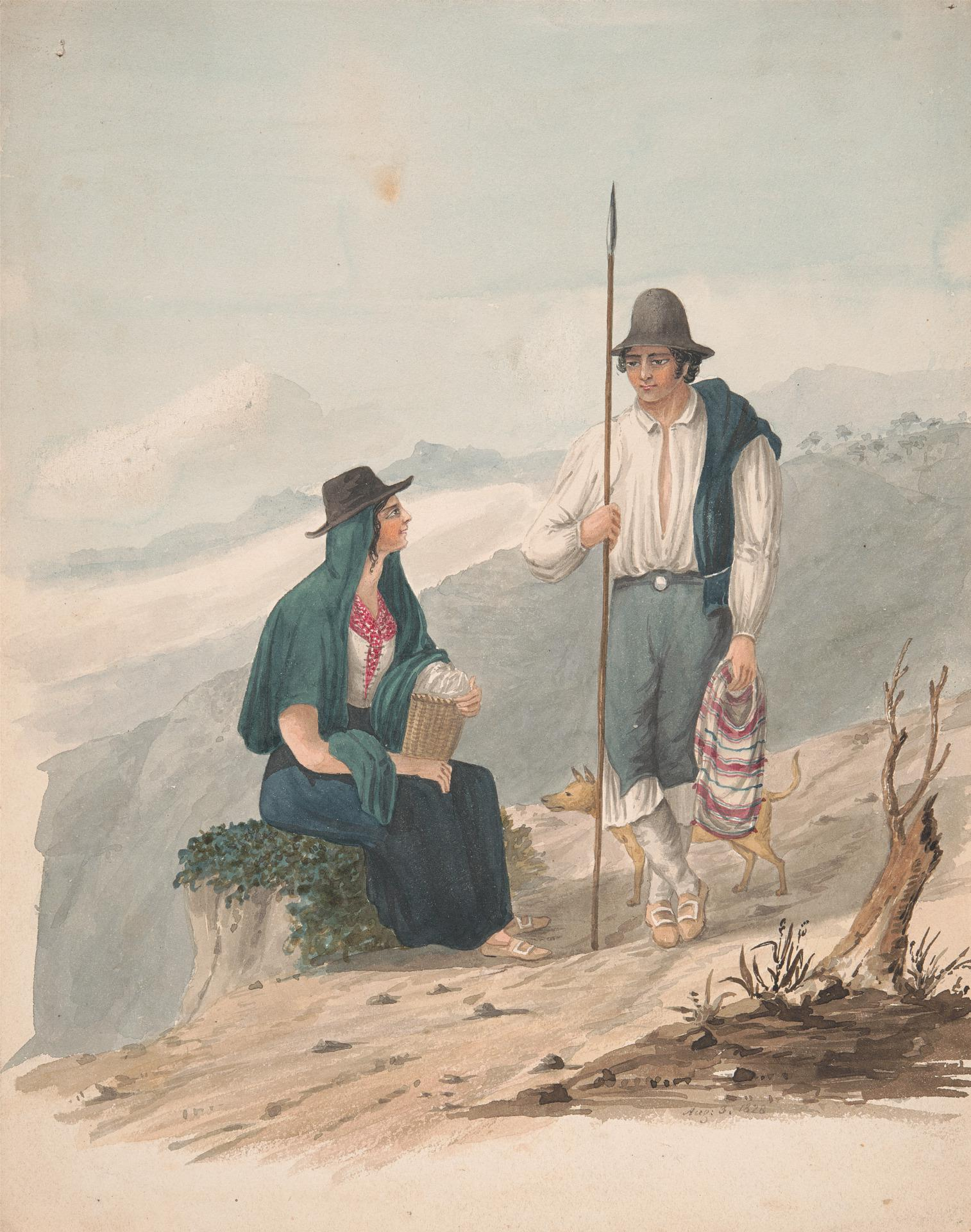
Canary Islanders in Tenerife, 1828

Alfred Diston's main contribution to the culture of the Canary Islands are the three well-known manuscripts of his work Costumes of the Canary Islands: the manuscript of the Kunstbibliothek in Berlin (1824); the manuscript sent to London, whose first part was published in 1829 by the leading publishing house Smith, Elder & Co.; and finally the manuscript belonging to the family de Lorenzo-Cáceres y Torres, which includes drawings made between 1829-1847, and which has recently been published as a facsimile.

In the middle of the Romantic era, between 1820 and 1840, there was a great interest in Europe, specifically in everything related to Spain and to the working classes. It is the era of travel literature, when works often came with engravings or lithographs—a recently discovered technique (1796) that made illustrated editions cheaper. This environment could explain Alfred Diston's personal taste for drawing and writing every remarkable thing he saw.

In his watercolours and gouaches, Diston shows in extensive detail the characteristics of the islands, as well as the considerably varied popular clothing, and the different local colours, professions and customs.

Despite the recognition of his contemporaries (locals and foreigners), Alfred Diston's work went unnoticed until one of his descendants highlighted the value of his manuscripts and remarks (1931; 1944), because they contributed to the knowledge of the traditional costumes and society of the Canary Islands in the first half of the 19th century.

In 2002, after a large monographic exhibition of his work and figure, his name and importance began to become known, not only at academic and specialised levels but also in folkloric and popular settings.

=== Intellectual and artistic contributor to the publications of scientists and travellers ===
His dual status as British and Canarian (by adoption), his welcoming personality and his knowledge of the Canaries motivated many of the visitors to Tenerife, mostly English speakers, to seek his collaboration as an informant, host, guide or simple companion. Daniel J. Browne, an American who visited Tenerife in 1834, wrote:

[...] "Port Orotava, Wednesday, August 22, 1833. I arrived here late last evening, lame and worn out with fatigue; and to-day have taken up my residence during my stay in this place with Mr. Alfred Diston, an English merchant, a gentleman no less distinguished for general information than for the friendly services which he has rendered scientific men who have visited these regions". ^{6} [...] "San Cristóbal de La Laguna, Thursday, October 10, 1833. After a protracted and satisfactory visit at Port Orotava, I took leave of my intelligent and hospitable friend, Mr. Diston, whose kind attentions I gratefully acknowledge, and shall long cherish them in my remembrance".

Among the most renowned, we can mention the English botanist Philip Barker Webb and the French naturalist Sabin Berthelot, co-authors of the four volumes of the monumental work Histoire Naturelle des Iles Canaries (Paris, 1836-1850). Although most of the original drawings of the work were made in the Canary Islands by the enigmatic J. J. Williams and at least fourteen of the drawings and all the maps were made by Berthelot himself; Alfred Diston contributed to the work with six drawings of people wearing traditional costumes that were later lithographed in Paris

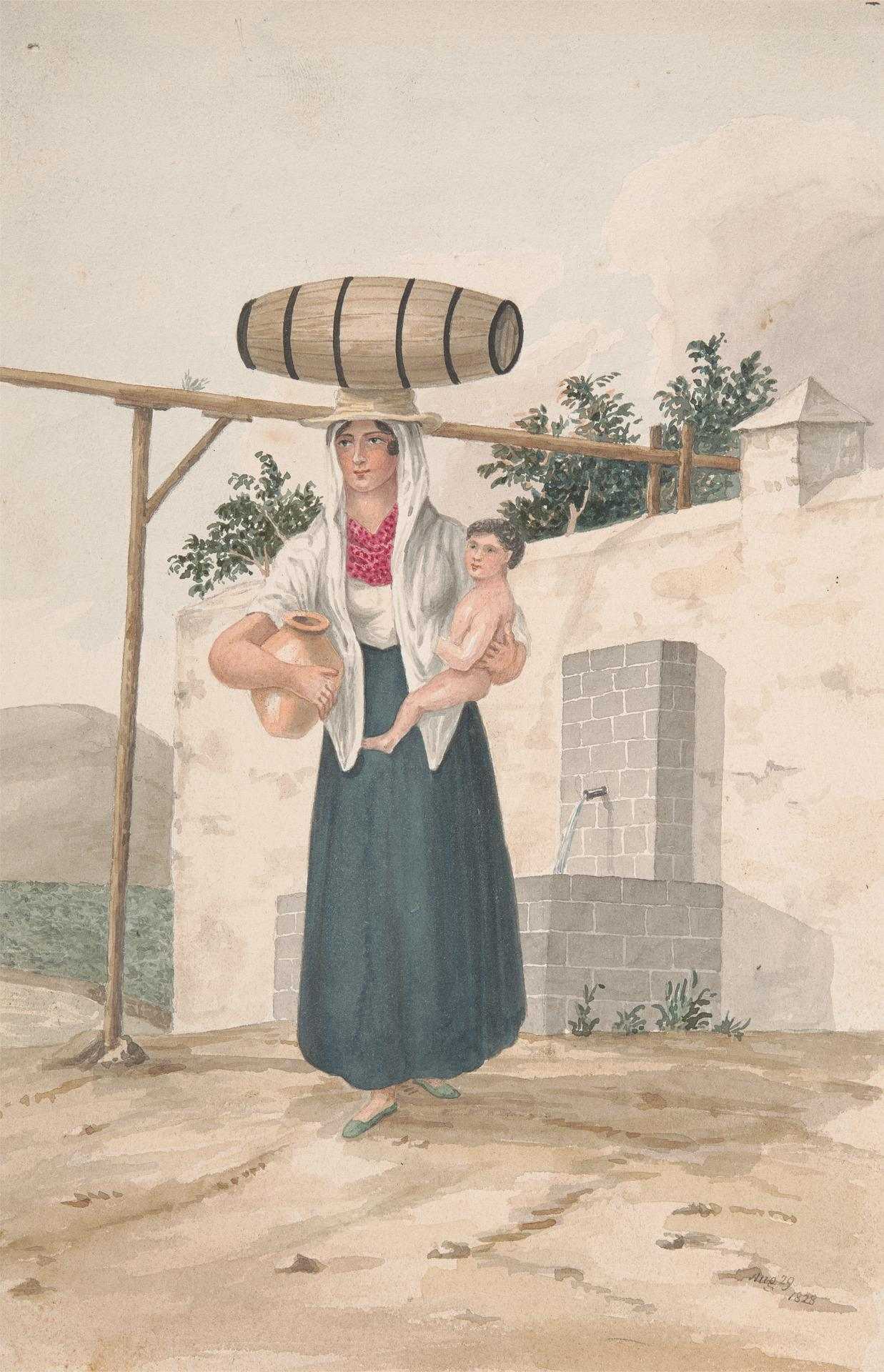
Canary woman with child, 1828

The British consul from 1825 to 1830, Francis Coleman McGregor, also relied on Diston as his informant and for making all the illustrations and maps of his work Die Canarischen Inseln (Hannover, 1831).

The painter Elizabeth Murray (née Heaphy), wife of a new British consul in the island, was the author of a well-known and controversial monograph about her stay in the Canary Islands. She kept in close contact with Alfred Diston and stayed for a month in his residence in Puerto de La Orotava (1857). There, she had the chance to paint the only known portrait of Diston, as well as to supervise the progress of Diston's daughter, Soledad Diston, as a watercolourist. Diston wrote sixty pages of Notes furnished Mrs. Murray for her intender work of these Islands with the purpose of providing her with information that served as a documentary source for her book about the Canary Islands.

Alfred Diston corresponded and exchanged notes and drawings with two of the most relevant scholar of Tenerife at the time: the writer Antonio Pereira Pacheco (1790-1858), prebendary of the Cathedral of San Cristóbal de La Laguna and parish priest of the parish of Tegueste; and the chronicler of Puerto de La Cruz, José Agustín Álvarez Rixo (1796-1883).

The renowned prebendary Pacheco was a historian, a scholar and author of a great variety of manuscripts on different subjects that, just as Diston did, illustrated his work with his own drawings, some of them of costumes and uniforms. Álvarez Rixo also exchanged letters, news and local information with Diston. In his Anales del Puerto de la Cruz de La Orotava, he leaves proof of Diston's extraordinary intellectual prowess:

[...] "being the best calligrapher in perhaps the entire province, he was also fond of drawing and painted our customs with his annotations that he printed in London in 1829. Likewise, he had collected several historical curiosities about these islands, merits for which he deserves to be remembered, as have some of the travellers that were referred to the firm Pasley, Little & Co., under Diston's management".

=== Naturalist ===
Diston's curiosity also led him to explore other fields such as the natural sciences of the time.

==== Botany contributions ====
His particular interest in botany, together with his prominent social status in Puerto de La Orotava, where he was one of the main contributors ^{9}, would explain the fact that in 1834 the RSEAP, Real Sociedad Económica de Amigos del País de Tenerife (Royal Economic Society of Friends of the Country of Tenerife), thought of him when the position of manager of the Acclimatisation Gardens of La Orotava (actual Botanical Garden of Puerto de la Cruz ) became vacant and without possibility of remuneration. They would also entrust him with the tasks of conservation and inspection. Although he was technically appointed as one of the three members of an acting commission, Alfred Diston was, in practice and for 14 years, the one who took over the managing tasks. Without a budget to cover the basic maintenance tasks, those years were critical for the Botanical Garden's survival, and he even had to contribute with his own money to cover several urgent expenses. Without Alfred Diston's intervention, the survival of the Botanical Garden would have probably been compromised. He inventoried the different plant collections and intervened in the resolution of different disputes related to the water supply, salary arrears and complaints about the gardener's work.

In 1819, he managed to acclimatise various Maranta arundinacea rhizomes from Madeira in the country estate that his boss, Archibald Little, had in Puerto de La Orotava, a garden known today as Jardín Sitio Litre. This plant was used to obtain a type of starch (arrowroot) that was valued at the time for cooking purposes.

In 1846, Diston introduced in Tenerife 3,000 rootstocks of turpentine pine from England.

In 1847, he sent French honeysuckle seeds (Hedysarum coronarium) to the RSEAP, a Mediterranean fodder plant used as animal feed. Diston had brought them from a trip to Malta, where part of his family resided at the time.

However, Alfred Diston's biggest impact on the economy of the Canary Islands was when he introduced the dwarf banana cultivar known as Dwarf Cavendish. It is accepted that the banana from the Gulf of Guinea was introduced in the Canary Islands in the 15th century, possibly by the Portuguese, and that it was brought to America from the Canary Islands (Hispaniola, 1516). However, although there is still no certainty about how and when the dwarf variety of the Cavendish banana was introduced in the Canaries, there is growing evidence that Alfred Diston was the introducer of this variety in the islands.

José Agustín Álvarez Rixo (1796-1883), in his undated work Noticia de varias de las plantas utiles que se han introducido en estas islas canarias en el presente siglo XIX, con los nombres de las personas á quienes debemos su recomendable introducción (no. XXII of file D of his catalogue), indicated that Diston introduced this variety in Tenerife in 1824:

"Dwarf banana. Musa Cavendish. It is fair to honour here the memory of the man who provided us with such a pleasant benefit. In the year 1824, Mr. Alfred Diston, a curious Scotsman who grew up in Puerto de la Cruz, on a trip to his homeland Scotland, saw the dwarf banana from the East Indies—whose botanical name is Musa Cavendish—in the garden of Sir Thomas Hempburen and took a plant that he brought to Tenerife, where it has proliferated admirably, inasmuch as it has three advantages over the plantains or bananas that we have previously known, they are: less risk of the winds affecting its growth, due to its short elevation and the sturdiness of its trunk; it reaches its full growth before the others, and it also produces a larger cluster. Although the bananas are somewhat thinner, some prefer its delicate taste to that of our primitive banana. The desire and impatience to multiply this admirable plant everywhere caused someone to steal the crop that Mr. Diston had in his orchard in Cueva del Pino in 1853, a violent procedure worthy of punishment, if those responsible for the deed had been discovered. El Eco del Comercio (no. 167) published the news of the introduction of this tree in the Canary Islands, as it has been said".

This same chronicler in his annals of 1853 also collected the news published on 12 November 1853 by this newspaper from Tenerife. The newspaper reported that “seven years earlier”, in 1846, Alfred Diston introduced the variety of Musa Cavendish in Puerto de La Orotava:

BANANAS. We do not want to conclude this article without expressing some recent observations on a species of dwarf bananas native to Cochinchina that Mr. Alfred Diston introduced in these islands about seven years ago. This excellent fruit of rich and exquisite flavour has propagated extraordinarily in La Orotava, and even in this capital; whether it be because it is preferable to those of a more ordinary sort, because it lacks sapwood, or because of its yield: some bunches weighed 73 pounds and had 255 bananas each. This species is known by the scientific name of Musa Cavendishia, but the most peculiar thing is that said plant, native to warm regions or at least with very mild weather, was brought to these islands from Scotland by Mr. Diston, who obtained three original seedlings from the greenhouse of Sir Thomas Hepburer (sic) that have successfully proliferated in our country.

Álvarez Rixo also writes:

"Around this time began the efforts to cultivate the dwarf banana in all the orchards of our Puerto where several seedlings had been stolen and taken to Sta. Cruz. It has been a few years since Mr. Diston brought them from Scotland, where he obtained them from the greenhouse in the garden of Sir Thomas Hempburer (sic). Said plant is named Musa Cavendish. The issue 167 of "El Eco del Comercio" gave this peculiar news, which was already known to us".

However, it would be more plausible that the introduction of these plants in the islands had taken place after 1835, according to Ken Fisher's recent work. The doctor and botanist Charles Telfair would have acclimatised the oriental banana seedlings in Mauritius and then, in 1829, sent them to England. In 1835, Joseph Paxton, head gardener of Lord William Cavendish, 6th Duke of Devonshire, would have succeeded in bringing them to fruition in the Duke's new glasshouses at Chatsworth House (Derbyshire, England). Later, Sir Thomas Buchan-Hepburn managed to acquire one of these seedlings for his property in Smeaton, East Linton (Scotland). It was probably there where Diston could have obtained this cultivar (in 1846, according to El Eco del Comercio), due to the fact that Sir Archibald Little, owner of the firm Pasley, Little & Co., was Sir Thomas's father-in-law.

==== Contributions in geography and geology ====
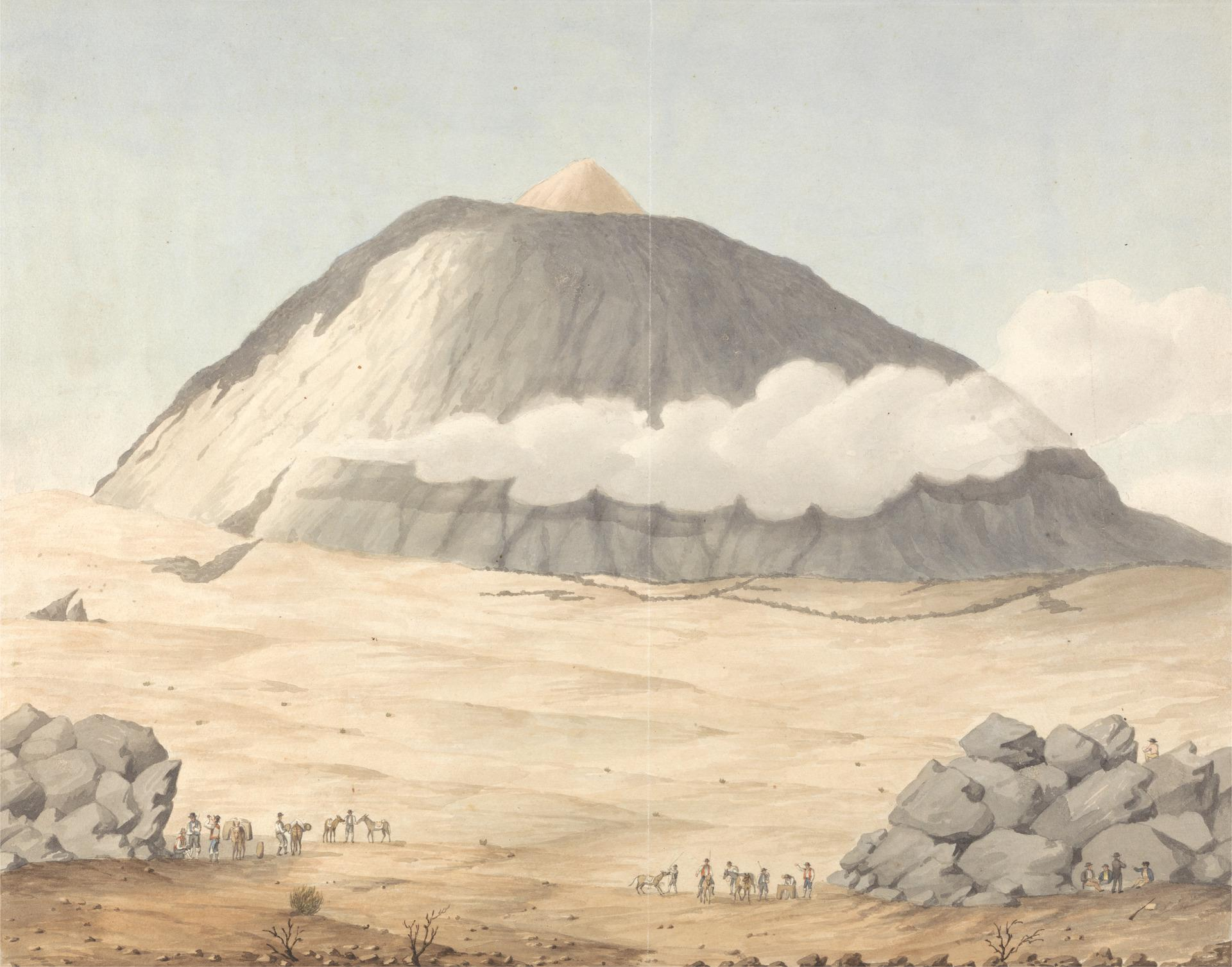
Teide volcano in Tenerife, 1829

Alfred Diston had several navigational instruments (nocturnal, naval compass...) and in his work Costumes he includes several tables with the geographic coordinates of numerous locations in the islands, as well as the altitude of the islands and the distances between them.

He draw several maps of the Canary Islands, one of them is in his family manuscript and other two are included in the work of the British consul Francis Coleman MacGregor.

On 29 August 1814, accompanied by three Britons and an American, he climbed from Puerto de La Orotava to the top of the “Peak”, the name that foreign travellers gave to the volcano Teide (12,198 ft.).

He also collected information on the 1798 eruption of the Mountain Chahorra or Pico Viejo (old peak) of Mount Teide and the Lanzarote eruption in 1824, making sketches and illustrations of volcanological interest that are still preserved.

==== Contributions in meteorology ====
Alfred Diston also had a barometer, a thermometer and an anemometer. In Costumes he includes a table with monthly records of temperatures (maximum, minimum, average), as well as rainfall (number of days of rain) and winds (directions and intensity). There are also notebooks with daily records of temperature and wind direction and speed over the course of nine years (1844-1853).

He described in detail the terrible storm from 6 to 9 November 1826 (“Inundation and Hurricane in 1826”), possibly a tropical hurricane considered the worst meteorological event registered in the history of the Canary Islands ^{45}. His report includes a table with the number of houses that suffered damage and the number of victims and injured in four towns of Valle de La Orotava. At the same time, he drew a detailed plan of the Barranco Martiánez and the urban centre of El Puerto de La Orotava where he pointed out the flooded areas and the houses affected by the flood, a record that is very similar to modern recreations of the flooded area.

=== Draughtsman, calligrapher and miniaturist ===
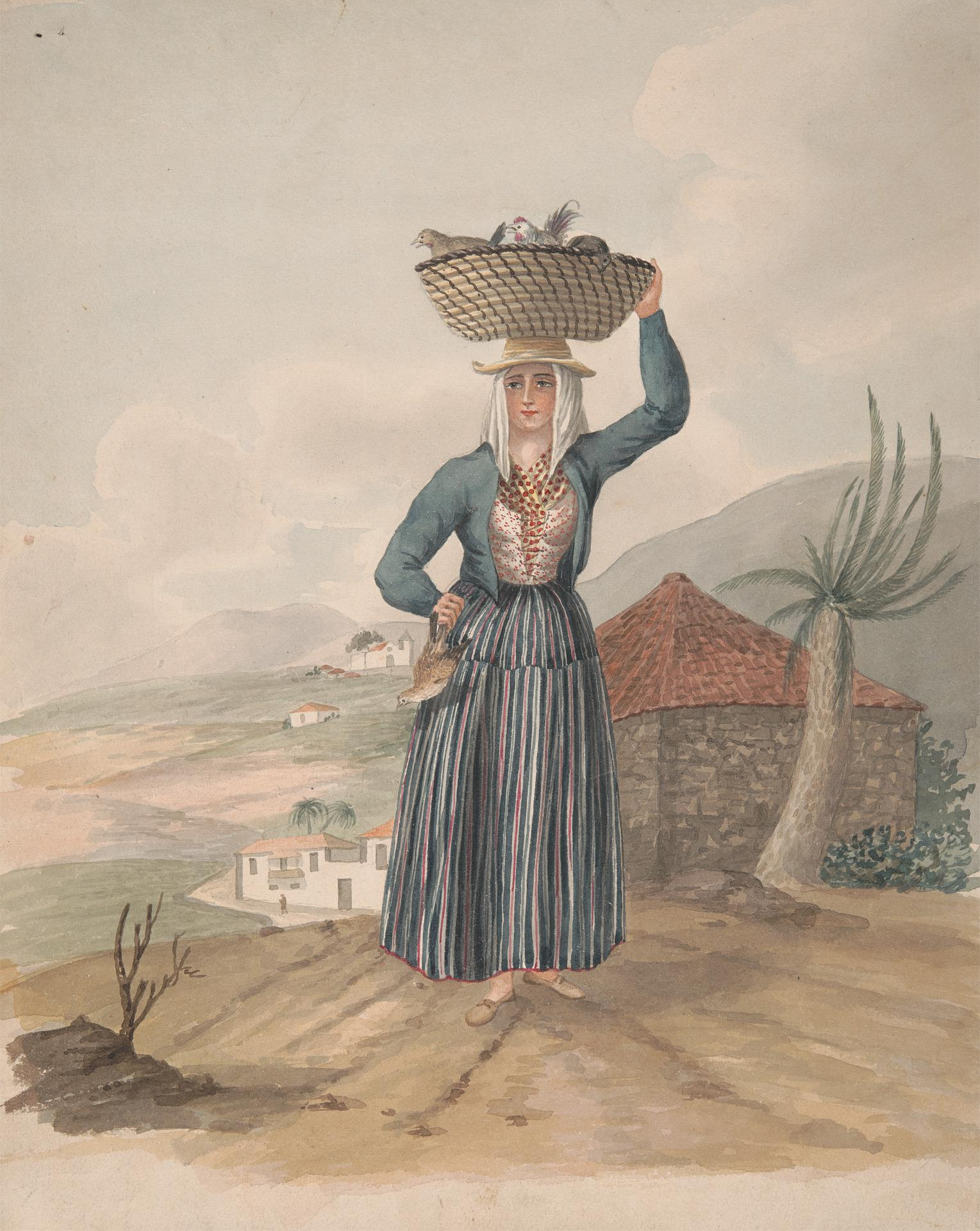
Woman from Tenerife, 1828

A meticulous draughtsman, he used manly watercolour in his sketches and life outlines, and gouaches to replicate the motifs of his sketches in his manuscripts. There are still numerous drawings and sketches about a great variety of subjects. The majority of them portray people from the popular classes, peasants or anglers in everyday scenes. Some drawings represent the well-to-do, religious people or people related to the military. He also drew a great number of landscapes and places of the island of Tenerife, plants and flowers, insects, volcanoes or marine scenes.

Although he has been primarily known for his drawings of traditional costumes, his skills as a calligrapher are evident in all his handwritten works. His contemporary Jose Agustín Álvarez Rixo even referred to him as “the best calligrapher in perhaps the entire province”, which is exemplified in both a missal and in two prayer books that he illuminated for the use of his devout Catholic wife.

=== Traveller ===
In 1819, he went on a business trip to Madeira.

He travelled from Tenerife to Malta, where his parents lived, at least twice. From his first journey (Nov. 1822-Apr.1823), there are still a detailed diary and a wide variety of illustrations with different popular types from the Mediterranean (Maltese, Greeks, Turks) and from the non-British population of Gibraltar (Spanish, Jews and Berbers).

== Works ==
=== Manuscripts with illustrations of traditional costumes ===
So far, three profusely illustrated manuscripts with drawings of traditional costumes of the Canary Islands have been identified.

==== 1824: The manuscript of the Kunstbibliothek (Berlin Art Library) ====
A manuscript with thirty-one colour gouache plates. On its first page, there is a dedication to his boss, Sir Archibald Little: “To Sir Archibald Little Esq.re of Shabden from his most grateful and obligated servant. Alfred Diston, Tenerife, 1824” (sic).

Twenty-one of the gouaches are accompanied by a page with their title and a handwritten text where the author explains them. These drawings portray a wide representation of popular costumes from all the islands.

It is in the Lipperheideschen costume library of the Berlin Kunstbibliothek. See NOTE.

==== 1829: The London edition ====
The publishing house Smith, Elder & Co. published Costumes of the Canary Islands, Part 1, along with six colour lithographs made by William Fisk, based on Diston's original drawings and with explanatory texts by the author himself. It seems to be a first chapter or first part (appears as “part 1” in the original edition) of the manuscript sent to London in 1828, which contained a greater number of plates that were never published.

The final destination of the rest of the plates sent to London for publication is still unknown.

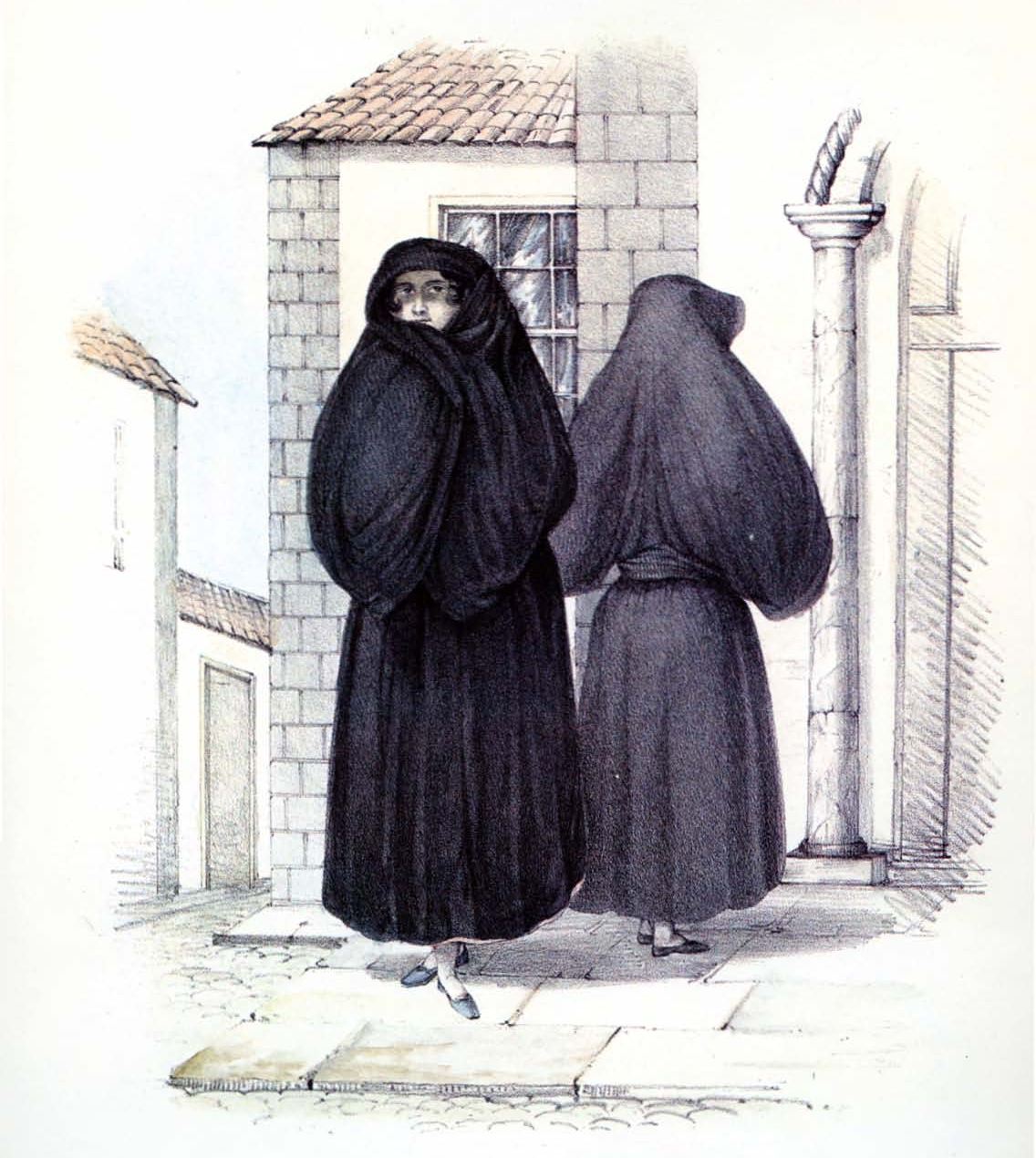
Manto y Saya. Costumes of the Canary Islands. A. Diston Del. W. Fisk Lith. Published by Smith, Elder & Co. Cornhill, 1829. One of the six plates of the London edition

==== 1829-1847: Tenerife family manuscript ====
Alfred Diston himself passed it on to his heirs until it ended up in the hands of the family De Lorenzo-Cáceres y Torres. In 2002, it was displayed in Santa Cruz de Tenerife in the exhibition “Alfred Diston y su entorno” (Alfred Diston and his environment). The original manuscript has been missing since 2009, although in 2018 it was possible to make a facsimile edition thanks to the photographic material published in 2004 by Ediciones Grial (Valencia, Spain).

=== Drawings for other authors’ works ===
1831: Diston illustrated four plates and two maps for the work Die Canarischen Inseln nach ihrem gegenwärtigen zustande, und besoderer beziehung auf topographie und statstik, gewerbfleiss, handel und sitten dargest (The Canary Islands according to their current state, and with special reference to topography and statistics, industry, commerce and customs. With maps, engravings and tables), written by Francis Coleman MacGregor, British consul in Tenerife from 1830 to 1835, published in Hannover by Hahnschen Buchhandlung.

The plates and the cartography that Diston made for this work were digitised by the project Humboldt and the original German edition of 1831 by Google Books. There is a 2005 edition translated into Spanish.

1839: Diston gave Sabin Berthelot six drawings of people from the Canary Islands that were lithographed on three plates of the volume Miscellanées canariennes, the second part of volume I of the Histoire Naturelle des Iles Canaries by Barker Webb and Berthelot himself, publish in Paris in 1839.

=== Collections of drawings of the Yale Center for British Art (Paul Mellon Foundation) ===
This Foundation, which has the largest collection of British art outside of Great Britain, has fifty-nine plates by Alfred Diston, forty-two of which represent figures and the rest are landscapes of Tenerife. All plates are independent (not bound within a manuscript), have a title and are dated between 1818 and 1829.

=== Notebooks ===
==== 1855-1858: “Notes furnished to Mrs. Murray for her intended work on these Islands" ====
This is perhaps the most interesting of Diston's notebooks that we know of. It consists of sixty handwritten pages with notes that document the account of Elizabeth Murray's trip to the Canary Islands. The topics covered are the following:

La Matanza. El Colegio. The story of Carmenati. The drago tree. La Virgen de Candelaria. Los Realejos. "Popping the question". Garachico. Ascent of the Peak of Tenerife. Port Orotava. Amusementes. Anécdotas relativas al ataque de Nelson a Sta Cruz en 1797, Note relative to the height of the Peak. La Pandorga. Ribbon dance. Saint John's day. Church at La Laguna. Fiesta de San Isidro. The conquest of Teneriffe. The enchanted island San Borondon. El árbol de Hierro. The burning of Judas. Grand Canary. Conquest of Grand Canary. Columbus. George Glas" (sic).

== Honours and awards ==
- In August 1834, Alfred Diston was appointed as a member of the Real Sociedad Económica de Amigos del País de Tenerife (RSEAP).
- Since October 1834, commissioned by the RSEAP, Alfred Diston took over the positions of inspector and interim manager of the Real Jardín Botánico de Aclimatación del Puerto de La Orotava (Royal Botanical Garden of Acclimatisation of Puerto de La Orotava) and carried out those tasks for fourteen years (1834-1848).
- In 1851, he was nominated Honorary Academic of the Royal Canarian Academy of Fine Arts.

== See also ==
- José Agustín Álvarez Rixo (1796-1883)
- Sabin Berthelot (1794-1880)
- Elizabeth Murray (1815-1882)

== Note ==
The manuscript of the Kunstbibliothek (Berlin Art Library), 1824:

Neither the manuscript nor its corresponding registration form are available on the Kunstbibliothek website.

The bibliographic record of this manuscript can only be found in the printed catalog Katalog der Lipperheideschen Kostümbibliothek, volume I, p. 306, published by Verlag Gebr. Mann in 1965.

== Bibliography ==
1. Multiple authors. Catalogue of the exhibition Alfred Diston y su Entorno. Una visión de Canarias del siglo XIX. Published by the Organismo Autónomo de Museos y Centros. Cabildo de Tenerife. Tenerife, 2002. ISBN 84-88594-29-1
2. Diston, Alfred. Los Trajes canarios de Alfred Diston. Facsimile edition published by the heirs of Mrs. Pilar de Lorenzo-Cáceres Torres. Santa Cruz de Tenerife, 2018. ISBN 978-84-09-02756-9 .
3. De Lorenzo-Cáceres Torres, Andrés. Los trajes canarios de Alfredo Diston. Tagoro, 1. CSIC. Instituto de Estudios Canarios. La Laguna de Tenerife, 1944: pp. 89–111.
4. De Paz Sánchez, Manuel. Alfred Diston; Historia de un hombre atrapado en un jardín. Idea, 2008. ISBN 978-84-8382-381-1.
5. De la Cruz Rodríguez, Juan., Alfred Diston, 1793-1861, in Textiles e indumentarias de Tenerife. Una aproximación histórica desde finales del siglo XVIII hasta nuestros días. Cabildo de Tenerife, 1995: pp. 329–334.
