= Triptych of Nava and Grimon =

Painting attributed to Pieter Coecke van Aelst and his workshop

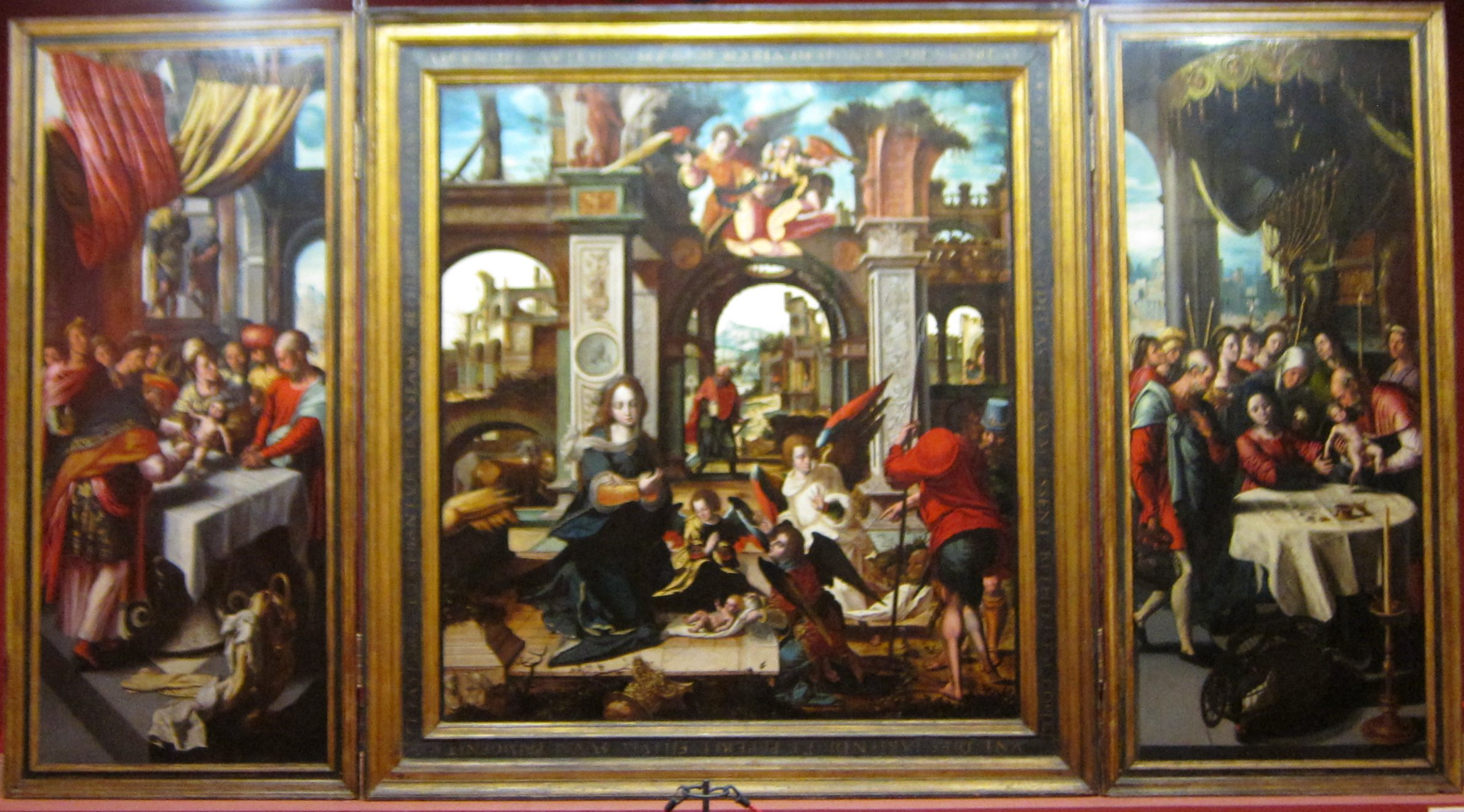
- Artist: Pieter Coecke and workshop
- Year: 1546
- Type: triptych
- Dimensions: Center panel: 190×190 cm (75×75 in); Lateral panels: 190×97 cm (75×38 in)
- Location: Museo Municipal de Bellas Artes de Santa Cruz de Tenerife, Santa Cruz de Tenerife

Triptych of Nava and Grimon is a Flemish painting, dated 1546. The central panel is attributed to Pieter Coecke, the lateral panels attributed to his workshop. This triptych is now in the Museo Municipal de Bellas Artes de Santa Cruz de Tenerife, located in the city of the same name in the Canary Islands (Spain).

== History ==
In the 16th century Tomás Grimón, a maestre de campo of Tenerife linked to the Spanish Crown, brought the triptych from Brussels to the private chapel of his house in San Cristóbal de La Laguna, where the Palacio de Nava now sits.

The triptych is actually a large "brush altarpiece", that in the early 17th century was taken apart, the side panels were taken to the chapel of the San Clemente (in the municipality of Santa Úrsula), owned by the same family, and the central panel to the Palacio de Nava. Thus it became a shared asset of the Nava and Grimon family.

In 1969 the panels were removed for restoration and divided into the private collections of his heirs. In 1991, the panels were provisionally reassembled in the family home Ascanio Estanga, until the CEPSA Foundation acquired the triptych. Today the panels are held in the Museo Municipal de Bellas Artes de Santa Cruz de Tenerife in Santa Cruz de Tenerife and the triptych is considered to be one of the most important Flemish paintings.

In 1998, the triptych was moved to Madrid to be in the exhibition: Masterpieces recovered, which featured a sample of Spanish Heritage artistic works, which have been treated and restored in recent years. The Triptych of Nava and Grimon and was the centerpiece and title of the exhibition.

== Description ==
It is an oil painting on a board, with three different scenes that show various topics related to the birth and childhood of Christ: the central panel represents the Nativity, while the left panel depict the Circumcision of Jesus and, on the right, the Presentation of Jesus at the Temple. On the back of both are the Annunciation of the Virgin Mary and the Archangel Gabriel, from the Gospel of Luke.

The work combines the elongated canonical figures with architectural elements taken from Vitruvius and Sebastiano Serlio, or Mannerist: rich palette with archaic formulas, showing on the one hand the formation of Pieter Coecke with Antwerp Mannerist and other traces of their stays in Italy and Turkey, and the study of the classical writers.
