= 1826 Canary Islands storm =

Storm

The 1826 Canary Islands storm (also known as San Florencio Storm) was the worst weather-related disaster in the history of the Canary Islands, claiming at least 298 lives. It was likely either a tropical cyclone or a storm system derived from a tropical cyclone.

== Meteorological history ==
The November 1826 storm has been explained as a tropical storm that intensified after an interaction with a mid-latitude trough and moved close to the Canary Islands; atmospheric pressures dropped to 966–947 hPa (28.5–28.0 inHg) at 500 metres (1,600 ft) elevation. Alternatively, the storm might have been an extratropical cyclone that formed from a tropical system. The French naturalist Sabin Berthelot explicitly called this storm a "hurricane".

== Impact ==
The storm impacted the entire Canary Islands, with some islands disproportionately hit. It is still the worst known weather-related disaster in the history of the Canary Islands.

Trees and plantations were flattened and winds with gusts probably exceeding 120–150 kilometres per hour (75–93 mph) damaged houses (reportedly 603 in Tenerife alone) and ships in ports (of which six were reportedly lost); the death toll in Tenerife reached 298 and sources speak of "floating cadavers" and "infinite number of dead". Most of the destruction and death toll was caused by the precipitation.

Geomorphological changes also took place in the islands as a consequence of the storm, an alluvial fan on Teide and flood deposits on Lanzarote were most likely formed by it.

During this storm, the original statue of the Virgin of Candelaria, the patron saint of the Canary Islands, disappeared.

== Records ==
Research on past tropical cyclone activity in the Canary Islands has gained importance after Tropical Storm Delta passed through the islands in 2005, amid concerns of global warming. Other storm events with rainfall that affected the Canary Islands aside from Tropical Storm Delta occurred in December 1645, January 1713, October 1722, November 1922, January 1957 and December 1975; none, however, was as intense as the 1826 event.
