= Heaphy Tin Man =

The Heaphy Tin Man, also known as the Heaphy Sheet Metal Man refers to several versions of folk art metal sculptures of a human form displayed for over a century in Syracuse, New York to promote a family business.

The various versions of the Heaphy Tin Man were functional works of art that served to promote the Heaphy family sheet metal shop and hardware store in Syracuse. The business was founded in 1892 alongside the Erie Canal, and the original product was mud flaps for horse-drawn wagons. The business gradually expanded to include sheet metal work, heating and hardware.

The Tin Man has had many forms, practically a stick form in its original incarnation it grew into a seven and a half foot 18 gauge iron colossus reinforced with heavy duty soil pipe submerged 4 feet into the ground and 5 ½ feet up through the interior of the figure to withstand potential impact.

Vandalism is not a recent threat; since its first installation in the early thirties, The Tin Man has survived many attempts at its demise, ranging from mild explosives to direct impacts with motor vehicles from a number of eras. Not only have the efforts been destructive, but some have also been merely embarrassing; along with the many messages in graffiti, the tin man was pelted on a number of occasions with various types of pies.

Some urban legends have cropped up along the way also, including the story that upon passing the figure on their way to a concert date in Syracuse the ironically labeled Heavy Metal band Black Sabbath conjured up the song “Iron Man”.

There are myriad stories of the giant and sometimes scary metal man that are secure in the collective memories of the area of Syracuse, New York.
