= Museo Municipal de Bellas Artes de Santa Cruz de Tenerife =

Coordinates: 28°28′06″N 16°14′59″W

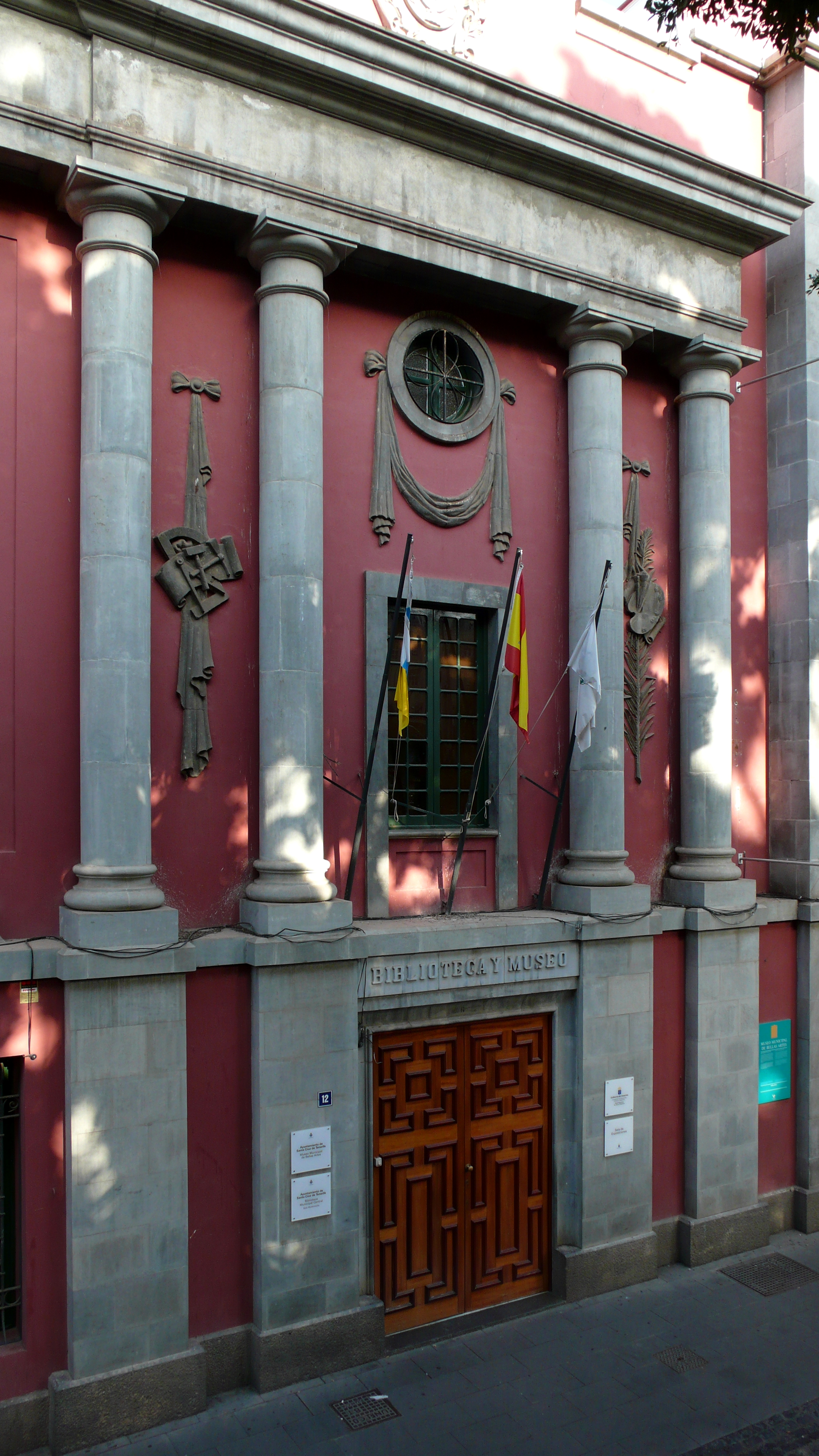
- Facade of the museum.
- Established: 1929
- Location: Calle José Murphy 12, Santa Cruz de Tenerife, Spain
- Type: Art museum

The Museo Municipal de Bellas Artes de Santa Cruz de Tenerife is a museum of fine arts located in the city of Santa Cruz de Tenerife (Tenerife, Canary Islands, Spain). Its headquarters are located in the rear of the Church of St. Francis of Assisi.

The museum dates back to 1840, when the city agreed to make some boxes to preserve flags from the French Revolutionary Wars. The building is of a classical style and was established in early 1929 by the architect Eladio Laredo. The exterior is decorated with ten different busts of the illustrious of Tenerife.

The museum has fourteen rooms that have a background as a repository of works from the Prado Museum in Madrid. The museum houses an art collection ranging from sixteenth-century Flemish to twentieth-century paintings, as well as a sample of sculptures and crafts. The "Tríptico de Nava y Grimón" by the Flemish painter Pieter Coecke is one of the most notable parts of the collection. Other noteworthy works are those by Canarian painter Juan de Miranda, Afonso Gaspar de Quevedo, Jose Rivera and Cristóbal Hernández de Quintana, among others.

== Gallery ==
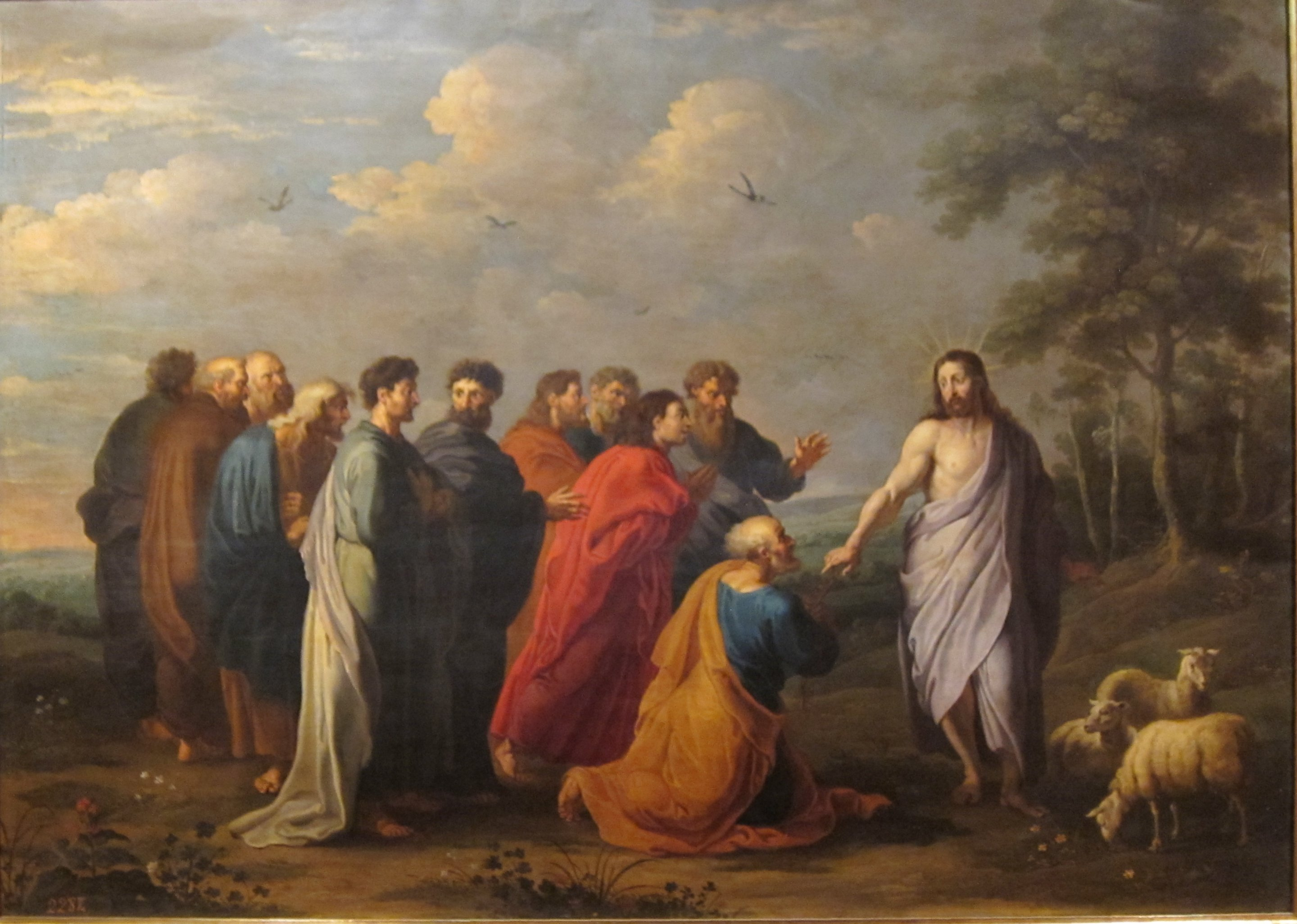
La Consigna de la Iglesia, Willem van Herp.

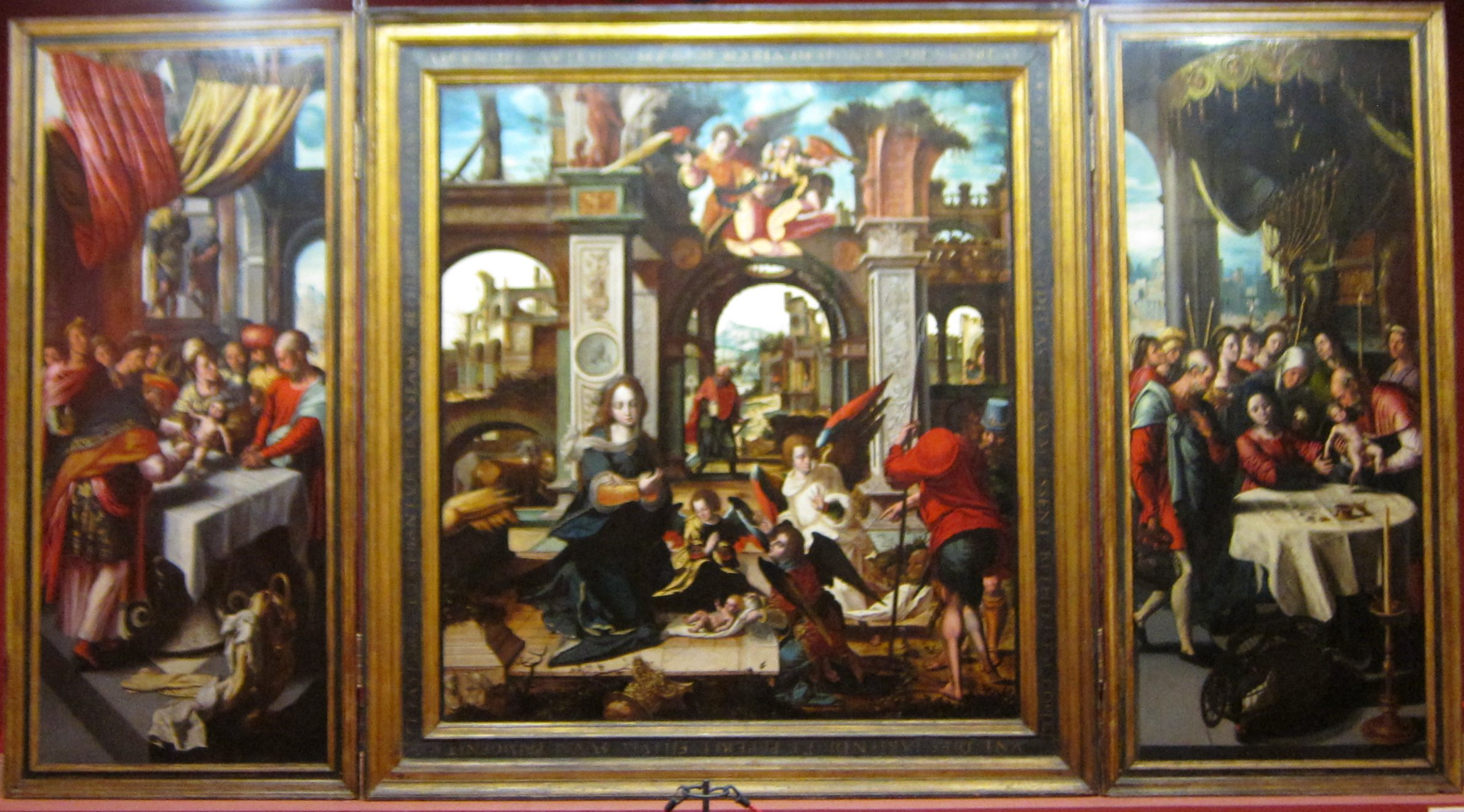
Tríptico de Nava y Grimón, Pieter Coecke van Aelst.

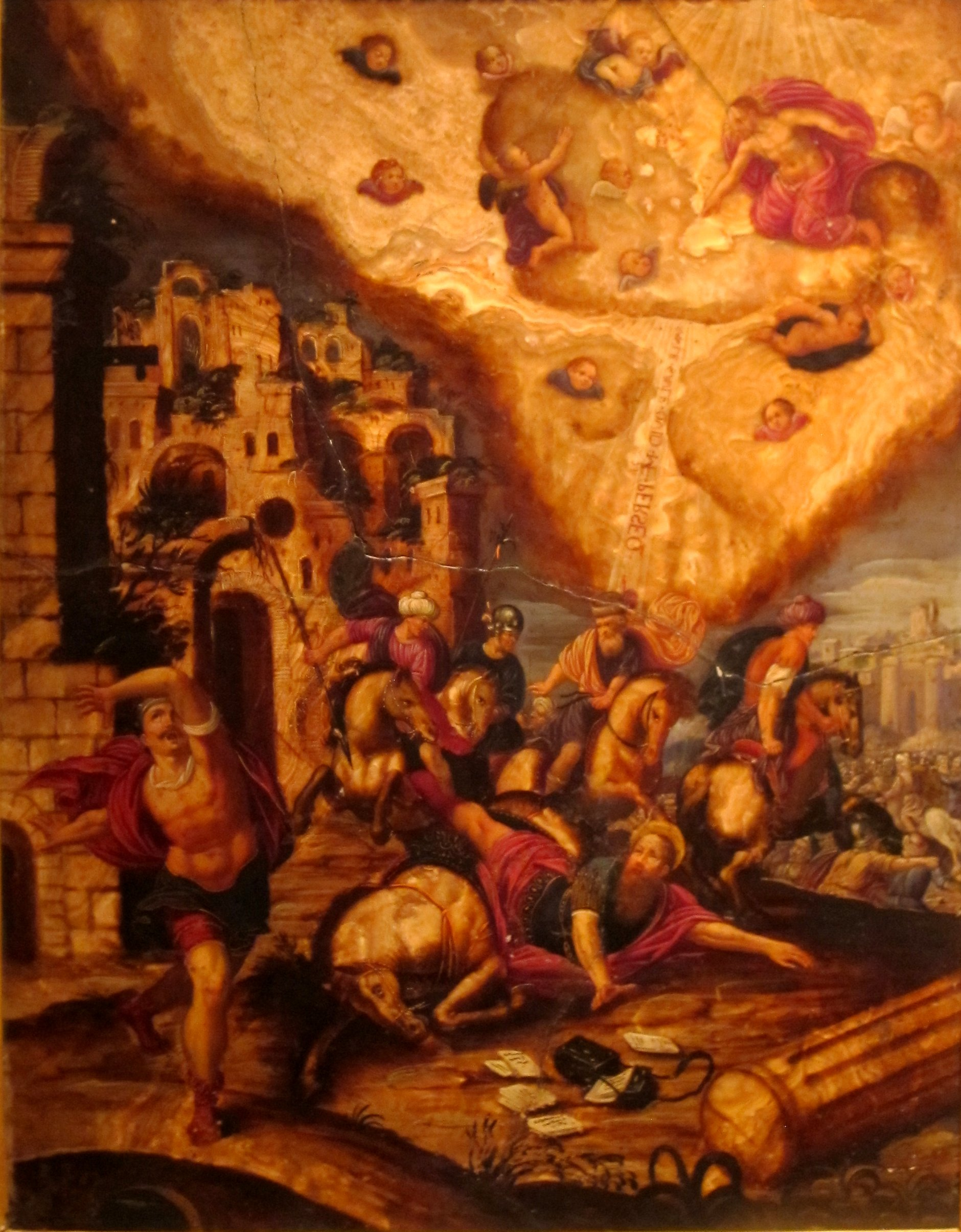
Conversion de San Pablo, anonymous sixteenth century.

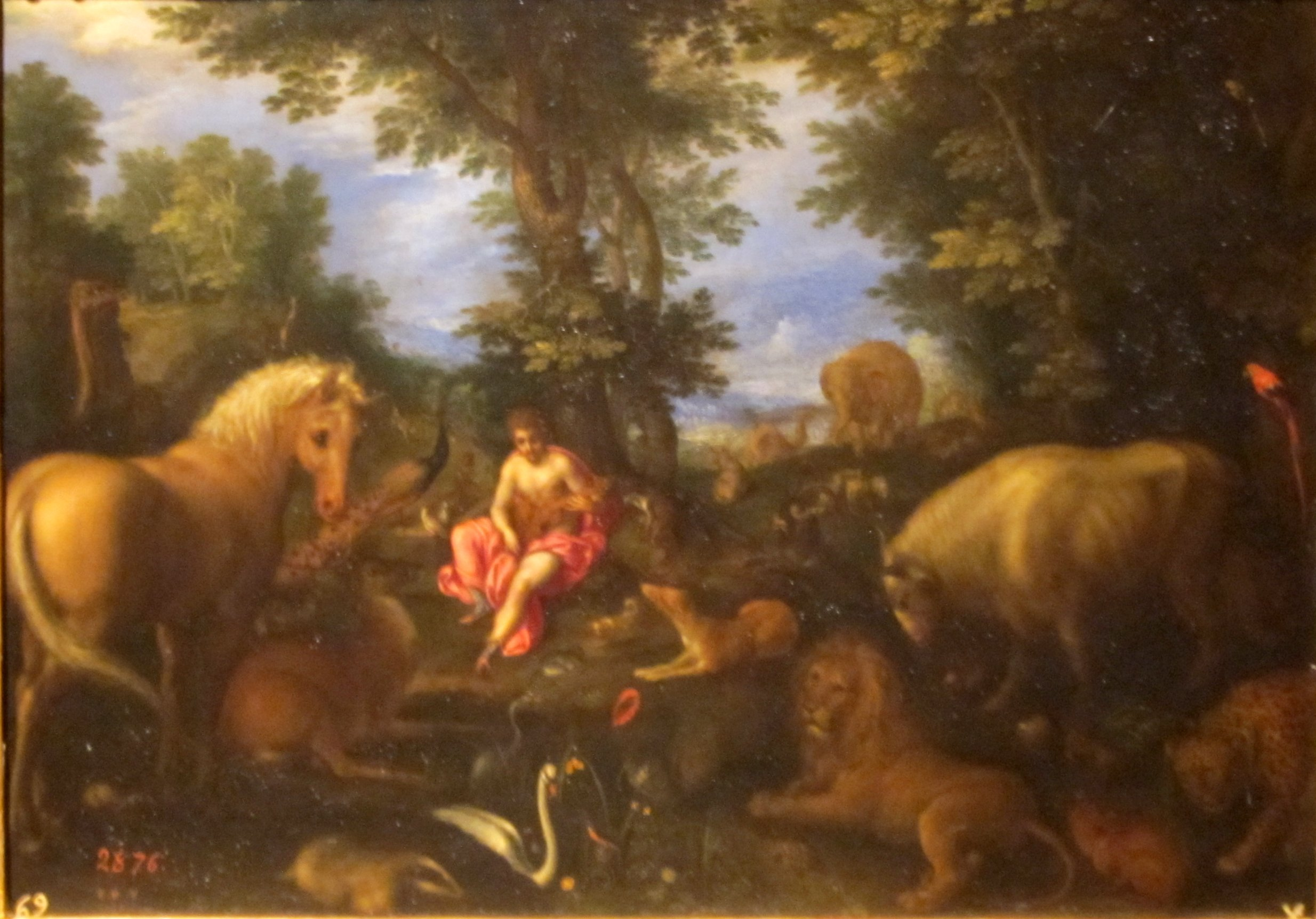
Orfeo, Jan Brueghel the Elder.
