= Thomas Frank Heaphy =

English painter

Thomas Frank Heaphy (born London, 2 April 1813; died London, 7 Aug 1873) was an English miniature painter.

Heaphy was the eldest son of the portrait painter Thomas Heaphy and Mary Stevenson. His younger brother Charles Heaphy became an explorer and decorated military man, and two of his sisters also became miniature painters. He painted miniature portraits, and has works that can be found in the Victoria and Albert Museum and the National Portrait Gallery, London. In 1861 he published eight articles in the Art Journal that attempted to ascertain the origin of the likeness of Christ.

== Publications ==
- The Likeness of Christ; Being an Inquiry into the Verisimilitude of the Received Likeness of Our Blessed Lord (1886)
