= Thomas Heaphy =

English painter

Thomas Heaphy the Elder (1775–1835) was a British watercolourist, known also for his portraits.

== Life ==
Heaphy was born in London on 29 December 1775. His father, John Gerrard Heaphy, was a merchant of Irish background, with a French wife. Heaphy was articled at an early age to R. M. Meadows the engraver, and attended a drawing-school run by John Boyne near Queen Square, Bloomsbury.

Heaphy was a successful painter. He devoted much of his fortune to developing land in the neighbourhood of what is now Regent's Park, and a portion of St. John's Wood owes its origin to him. This took him temporarily away from painting. He then established the Society of British Artists, of which he was elected the first president, and to its first exhibition, in 1824, contributed nine works, but he resigned his membership the following year. In 1831 he went to Italy, where he remained until the middle of the following year, and made copies of famous pictures by the old masters. After his return to England he painted little.

Heaphy died at 8 St. John's Wood Road, 23 October 1835, and was buried in Bunhill Fields.

== Works ==
Heaphy exhibited for the first time at the Royal Academy in 1797, and until 1804 his contributions were exclusively portraits, but in that year he sent a subject picture, The Portland Fish Girl. Subsequently, he turned his attention to water-colour painting, to which he from that time confined himself, and became a large contributor to the exhibitions of the newly formed Water-colour Society, then held in Spring Gardens, where his representations of fish markets and other scenes of working-class life were popular. In 1807 he became an associate of the society, and in the same year a full member; his Hastings Fish Market, exhibited in 1809, sold for five hundred guineas.

Heaphy at this point returned to portraiture, successfully. He was appointed portrait-painter to the Princess of Wales; Princess Charlotte, Prince Leopold, and other distinguished persons sat to him.

In 1812, giving up his membership of the Water-colour Society, Heaphy went at the invitation of the Duke of Wellington to Spain and the British camp in the Peninsular War. Here he painted the portraits of officers, and on his return executed his major work, a representation of the Duke of Wellington giving his orders previous to a general action, which comprised portraits of about fifty generals. An engraving from this, begun by Anker Smith and finished by Heaphy himself, was published by him in 1822. The picture was a direct commission from the king, but it appears to have remained with the artist, since it figured in the sale of his effects.

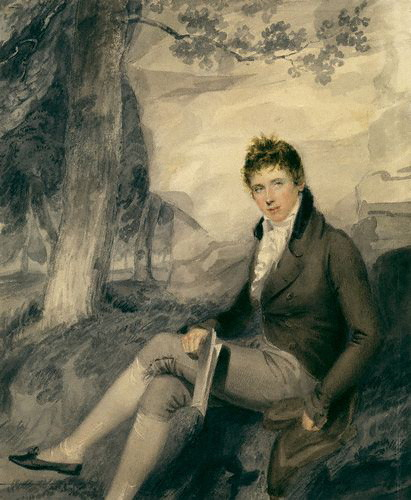
Thomas Heaphy, 1802 portrait of Henry Temple, the future Prime Minister Lord Palmerston

Though reputedly opposed to the Royal Academy, Heaphy contributed to its exhibitions to the end of his life. The South Kensington Museum acquired two of his water-colours, The Sore Leg and Coast Scene with Figures, and the National Portrait Gallery, London a youthful portrait of Lord Palmerston. His portraits of the Duke and Duchess of Buccleuch were engraved.

== Family ==
Heaphy's first wife, Mary Stevenson, whom he married in 1800, died some time after 1820; his second, Harriet Jane Mason, survived him. Heaphy had by his first wife two sons, Thomas the younger and Charles, and three daughters, two of whom, Mary Ann (married name Musgrave) and Elizabeth (married name Murray), painted and exhibited in watercolour.

== Notes ==
Attribution

This article incorporates text from a publication now in the public domain: Stephen, Leslie; Lee, Sidney, eds. (1891). "Heaphy, Thomas (1775-1835)". Dictionary of National Biography. Vol. 25. London: Smith, Elder & Co.
