= Society of Women Artists =

British art body

- Established: c. 1855
- Type: Arts Society
- Legal status: Registered Charity
- Location: London
- Key people: Princess Michael of Kent (Patron); Helen Sinclair (president)
- Website: www.society-women-artists.org.uk

The Society of Women Artists (SWA) is a British art body dedicated to celebrating and promoting fine art created by women. It was founded as the Society of Female Artists (SFA) in 1855, offering women artists the opportunity to exhibit and sell their works. Annual exhibitions have been held in London since 1857, with some wartime interruptions.

== History ==
Particularly during the 19th century, the British art world was dominated by the Royal Academy (RA), founded in 1768. Two of the 34 named founders were women painters: Angelica Kauffman (1741–1807) and Mary Moser (1744–1819). However, it was not until 1922 that other female artists were admitted to the academy. Annie Swynnerton, a member of the Society of Women Artists since 1889, was elected as the first female associate member of the Royal Academy and in 1936, Dame Laura Knight became the first female elected full member of the Royal Academy.

A woman's place in society was perceived as passive and governed by emotion. And in the 1850s, the idea that women could be artists was hotly debated by John Ruskin and other critics in various journals. Ruskin wrote to Sophia Sinnett in 1858 "You must resolve to be quite a great paintress; the feminine termination does not exist, there never having been such a being as yet as a lady who could paint." Women were not considered as serious contributors to the field of art and had great difficulty in obtaining a public showing. Their education in the arts was limited and they had been excluded from the practice of drawing from the nude figure since the Royal Academy was founded. However, Ruskin later revised his opinion of women artists after seeing Elizabeth Thompson's The Roll Call at the Royal Academy in 1874. After much debate and petitioning, in December 1883, the Royal Academy Schools agreed to provide life classes "for the study of the partially draped figure" to female students but it was a further 10 years before women were admitted to these classes. It was at this time that life classes for women were becoming more widely available across the country.

Nevertheless, British women artists proved themselves capable of working both individually and in collaboration and consequently, gained greater credibility. In order to progress and find opportunities to exhibit, they began to form their own organisations. One of the most significant of those bodies was the Society of Female Artists, founded around 1857. Initially, membership was granted to women who had exhibited with the Society and who earned their livelihood through art.

=== Society of Female Artists (c. 1855 – c. 1869) ===
In 1855, English biographer Harriet Grote (1792–1878), together with a number of female artists and philanthropists, founded the Society of Female Artists. The society was initially managed by a committee, and, although its members were sometimes listed in early catalogues, no presiding officer was ever named. The first published committee (1859) was composed of Harriet Grote; Mrs Edward Romilly; Mrs Stephenson; watercolour artist Elizabeth Murray; opera singer Jenny Lind, who was a friend of Harriet Grote; the novelist Lady Harriet Jane Trelawny; Miss Sotheby; and Catherine Stanley (nee Leycester), the mother of Arthur Penrhyn Stanley. Leonie Caron (later Mrs Alfred Buss) was the Society's first Secretary in 1857, succeeded by Mrs Elizabeth Dundas Murray, who served as Secretary from 1858 to 1865. Contemporary press reports also place Mrs David Laing (nee Mary Elizabeth West) among the founders. Early members included Mary Thornycroft, Margaret Tekusch and Augusta Innes Withers.

The society's first exhibition, held at 315 Oxford Street, London between 1 June and 18 July 1857, became the focus of debate with regard to the role of women in art. The exhibition comprised 358 works by 149 female artists, the predominant genre being landscapes. In May 1857, prior to the opening, The Art Journal and The Spectator were supportive of the exhibition. After the exhibition closed, The Art Journal reported that "The Committee express their gratification in announcing that the success of their first exhibition has fully equalled their expectations." The Society then held annual exhibitions in London showing work of women artists (except in the years 1912–1914, 1919 and 1940–1946).

Until 1863, the annual exhibition received controversial reviews, probably as exhibits were chosen on a liberal and amicable basis. This was addressed in 1869, when their lack of professionalism led to a reorganisation of the Society under the patronage of the Duchess of Cambridge and consequently it was renamed the Society of Lady Artists. The Society has received royal patronage since 1865 (the current patron is Princess Michael of Kent).

In 1867 Mrs. Madeline Marrable, a prolific watercolourist and oil painter, joined the committee.

=== Society of Lady Artists (c 1869 – 1899) ===
The Society's earliest records were lost or destroyed during World War II at the Society's headquarters at 195 Piccadilly, London (the Society's catalogues and remaining papers dating from 1929 are now housed in the Victoria and Albert Museum Library). As a result, there is some debate as to exactly when the Society was renamed from the SFA to the SLA. Secondary sources of reference suggest 1869, whereas other sources suggest it was 1873.

In 1886, Marrable became the first president of the society. In 1899, the mid-Victorian persona was discarded and the 20th century was embraced by the society with a new name, the Society of Women Artists (SWA).

=== Society of Women Artists (1899–present) ===
The society has had many notable artists among its members. Dame Laura Knight, the first woman Royal Academician, was elected president in 1932 and retained that office until she retired in 1968 to become a Patron. Illustrator Mabel Lucie Atwell and Suzanne Lucas, past President of the Society of Botanical Artists and the first woman president of Royal Miniature Society (now known as Royal Society of Miniature Painters, Sculptors and Gravers), were also members. Current members include Daphne Todd, the first female president of the Royal Society of Portrait Painters from 1994 to 2000 and winner of the BP Portrait Award 2010, portraitist June Mendoza, and Philomena Davidson, first woman president of the Royal British Society of Sculptors.

Many SWA members are also members of other well-established societies, such as the Royal Society of British Artists, the Royal Institute of Painters in Water Colours, The Pastel Society, and the Society of Equestrian Artists.

The SWA collated a four-volume dictionary of the society's exhibitors to 1996. The society's archive was given to the Victoria & Albert Museum's Archive of Art and Design in 1996. Only the RA and the Royal Scottish Academy produce such records.

== Membership ==
Membership of the SWA is composed of a maximum of 150 members. They promote new artists and encourage non-members to show their work at their annual exhibition.

The first step towards becoming a member is to submit six works regularly (although a maximum of four will be hung) for the Annual Open Exhibition. These are considered by a selection committee, and if judged exceptional, the artist is elected to become an associate member (ASWA), subject to space within the society. Associate members become eligible for election to full membership in the following year.

=== Presidents ===
- 1886–1912 Madeline Marrable
- 1913–1915 Mary Pownall
- 1916 Probably Beth Amoore
- 1917–1922 Lota Bowen
- 1923–1931 Charlotte Blakeney Ward
- 1932–1967 Dame Laura Knight
- 1968–1976 Muriel, Lady Wheeler
- 1977–1982 Alice Rebecca Kendall
- 1982–1985 Gladys Dawson
- 1985–2000 Barbara Tate
- 2000–2005 Elizabeth R. Meek, MBE, HPRMS, FRSA
- 2005–2012 Barbara Penketh Simpson
- 2012–2017 Sue Jelley
- 2017–2020 Soraya French
- 2020–2020 Dr Linda Smith
- 2021– Helen Sinclair

=== Acting presidents ===
- 1932–1933 Dorothea Sharp
- 1934–1936 Helen Stuart Weir
- 1937–1939 Constance Bradshaw
- 1940 Ethel Léontine Gabain
- 1947–1948 Dorothea Medley Selous (aka. Jamieson)
- 1949–1950 Irene Ryland
- 1951–1967 Muriel, Lady Wheeler
- 1973–1976 Alice R. Kendall

=== Notable members ===
(In alphabetical order, excluding SWA presidents or acting presidents, listed above)

- Margaret Backhouse
- Rose Maynard Barton
- Jose Christopherson
- Florence Claxton
- Edith Collier
- Lillian Cotton
- Helga von Cramm
- Ursula Fookes
- Frances C. Fairman
- Laura Sylvia Gosse
- Alice Gwendoline Rhona Haszard
- Cecil Mary Leslie
- Sarah Louisa Kilpack
- Margaret Macadam
- Vivien Mallock
- June Mendoza
- Elizabeth Harcourt Mitchell
- Sara Page
- Emily Murray Paterson
- Hazel Reeves
- Janet Russell
- Mabel Mary Spanton
- Edith Mary Hinchley
- Elizabeth Southerden Thompson
- Helen Thornycroft
- Daphne Todd
- Flora Twort
- Margaret Helen Waterfield
- Emily Warren
- Mabel Wickham
- Caroline Fanny Williams

=== Officers ===
President

- Helen Sinclair

Vice Presidents

- Anne Blankson-Hemans
- Rachel Parker

Directors

- Soraya French
- Dani Humberstone
- Sue Jelley PPSWA SPF
- Rosemary Miller SAA

Honorary Treasurer

- Rachel Parker SWA

Company Secretary

- Rosemary Miller SAA

Executive Secretary

- Rebecca Cotton

Press Officer

Council Members

- Michele Ashby
- Anne Blankson-Hemans
- Julie Colins
- Estelle Day
- Sera Knight
- Rachel Parker
- Angela Brittain
- Helen Sinclair
- Dr Linda Smith

Honorary Members

- Philomena Davidson PPRBS
- June Mendoza AO OBE RP ROI
- Ruth Pilkington ROI
- Susan Ryder PVPRP NEAC
- Emma Sergeant
- Daphne J. Todd OBE PPRP NEAC FRSA
- Belinda Tong
- Joyce Wyatt HonUA ASAF(HC) FRSA

Honorary Retired Members

- Eva Castle
- Pamela Davis
- Mary Grant
- Pam Henderson
- Patricia Nichols
- Joyce Rogerson
- Dorothy Watts

== Activities ==
=== Annual exhibition ===
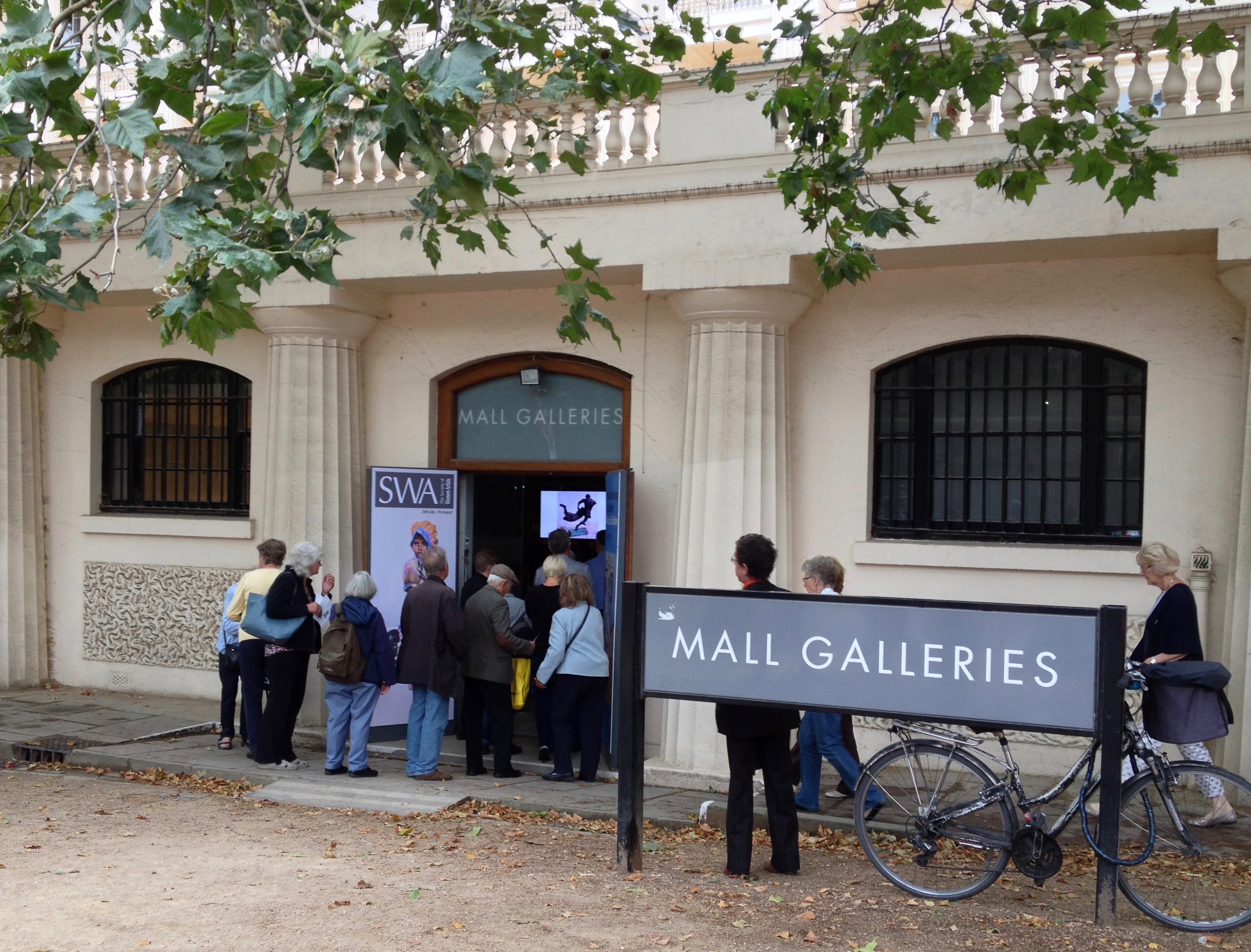
Mall Galleries, London

The society holds various exhibitions throughout the year, culminating in the annual exhibition at the Mall Galleries in London. The exhibition consists of works by members and non-members, which are selected by a panel from an open call for entries. The exhibition offers awards to selected artists, many of which are supplied by the Society's sponsors, and aims to highlight the wide range and diversity of fine art created by women.

Exhibition venues since the inception of the SFA have always been in London – listed below:

- 1857 The Gallery, 315 Oxford Street
- 1858 The Gallery, Egyptian hall, Piccadilly
- 1859 Gallery 7 Haymarket
- 1860–1863 53 Pall mall ('At the gallery of the new society of water-colour painters, two doors from the british institution')
- 1863–1867 48 Pall Mall
- 1868–1896 Initially held at the Architectural Association, Conduit Street, with other venues, probably at Great Marlborough Street, the Haymarket, Pall Mall, and at the Egyptian Hall, Piccadilly.
- 1897–1922 6a Suffolk Street, with the exception of the years 1912 to 1914 and 1919.
- 1923–1940 Royal Institute Galleries
- 1941–1946 No exhibitions were held during World War II
- 1947 The Guildhall
- 1948–1969 Royal Institute Galleries
- 1970 Chenil Galleries
- 1971–1987 The Mall Galleries
- 1988–1989 Westminster Gallery
- 2000–2003 Westminster Hall
- 2004–2020 The Mall Galleries
- 2020-2021 The exhibition this year was held online due to COVID-19 restrictions
- 2022-2023 The Mall Galleries

=== Special reception ===
The SWA has a history of collaborating with charities to help with the under-privileged and vulnerable. Currently, the SWA collaborates with Breast Cancer Now, the UK's largest breast cancer charity, created by the merger of Breast Cancer Campaign and Breakthrough Breast Cancer. Each year a special reception is held during the annual exhibition, here members donate works that are auctioned and the proceeds from the sales are presented to the charity.

=== Demonstrations and workshops ===
During the annual exhibition and within the gallery, member artists provide a series of informal demonstrations to the public. Special workshops are also led by members and held within the Learning Centre at the Mall Galleries.

== Sources ==
- Barbara Tate and the Society Of Women Artists, www.barbaratate.co.uk/painting-menu/23-fine-art-stories/150-society-of-women-artists.html retrieved 01-01-2017
- Baile De Laperriere, Charles, The Society of Women Artists exhibitors 1855–1996 : a dictionary of artists and their works in the annual exhibitions of The Society of Women Artists, 4 volumes, Hilmarton Press, Wiltshire, c1996
- Gray, Sara, The Dictionary of British Women Artists, The Lutterworth Press, 2009, www.lutterworth.com/pub/dictionary%20women%20artists%20intro.pdf retrieved 01-01-2017
- Just Opened London, Society of Women Artists retrieved 01-01-2017
- Nunn, Pamela Geraldine, The Mid-Victorian Woman Artist 1850–1879, PhD Thesis, University College London, 1982
- The Society of Women Artists 155th Annual Exhibition 2016 catalogue
