= Marrable =

Marrable is a surname. Notable people with the surname include:

- Frederick Marrable (1819–1872), British architect
- Madeline Marrable (1833–1916), British painter
