= Beatrice May Baker =

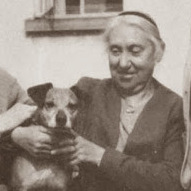
- Beatrice May Baker and Major c. 1940
- Born: 4 May 1876; Hereford
- Died: 28 September 1973 (aged 97); Nailsea
- Education: Hereford High School, Royal Holloway College
- Occupation: Headmistress
- Known for: Headmistress of Badminton School
- Partner: Lucy Jane Rendall

Beatrice May Baker (4 May 1876 – 28 September 1973), known as BMB, was an English headmistress and internationalist who developed Badminton School into a progressive school.

== Life ==
Baker was born in Hereford in 1876. She and her three elder siblings attended the private Hereford High School. In 1896 she went to Royal Holloway College for one year and she became a Bachelor of Arts. She had won a three-year scholarship to complete her education but she left after a year. She did some teaching in London before joining the Cardiff Intermediary School for Girls in 1902. The school was developing new ideas and the head Mary Collin and her deputy, Marion Layton, like Baker had degrees. Baker would later follow Collin's style of being strict but open to new ideas. At the school Baker met her life partner Lucy Jane Rendall.

A school which was known as Miss Bartlett's School for Young Ladies in 1898 was based at Badminton House in Clifton in Bristol. In 1911 it took Baker on trial and she was soon in charge of the school. She and Rendall transformed the school and by the end of the first world war the majority of the school's eight staff had degrees.

In 1924 the school moved to its present site in Westbury-on-Trym. Baker, known as BMB, was fundamental in shaping Badminton's ethos and had a deep personal influence on individual pupils. She encouraged the girls to be aware of world affairs and internationalism. A pioneer in many educational fields, she established Badminton as a much-admired progressive school. She encourage her students to develop a freedom of expression and encouraged a questioning approach to their learning: "in chapel 'Jesus often had to share the stage with Lenin'". In 1931 the school became a public school and unlike the nationalist leanings of its competitors the school has devoted to internationalism.

== Death and legacy ==
Baker died in retirement in Nailsea in Somerset.

By the late 1960s, the progressive aspects of Badminton school were said to have but vanished in 1971 and it had become a standard independent academic school.
