= Fookes =

Fookes is a surname. Notable people with the surname include:

- Catherine Fookes (born 1970), British politician
- Ernest Fookes (1847–1948), New Zealand rugby union footballer
- Janet Fookes (born 1936), British politician
- Peter Fookes (1933–2020), British engineering geologist
- Ursula Fookes (1906–1991), English painter and printmaker

== See also ==
- Fooks
