= Cherry Ripe (painting) =

Painting by John Everett Millais

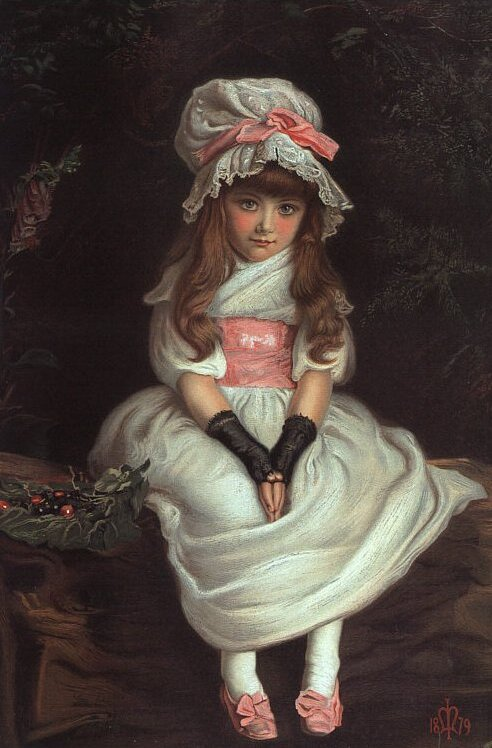
- Artist: John Everett Millais
- Year: 1879
- Type: Oil on canvas
- Location: Private collection

Cherry Ripe is an 1879 oil painting by the English artist John Everett Millais. It depicts a young girl sitting on top of two sacks of cherries. She wears Georgian-style dress, inspired by Sir Joshua Reynolds's 1788 portrait of Penelope Boothby.

== The painting ==
The painting was commissioned in 1879 by William Luson Thomas, founder and editor of The Graphic. His four-year-old niece Edie (Edith) Ramage had attended a fancy-dress ball dressed as Penelope Boothby in the Reynolds portrait, and Thomas was so charmed he wanted to commemorate the event. The Graphic paid Millais 1,000 guineas for the commission, which figure presumably included the copyright, as in 1880 The Graphic offered a coloured reproduction of the image to subscribers. The print was very popular, becoming "a sentimental adornment in every Victorian and Edwardian nursery".

The proprietors of The Graphic sold the painting to art dealer Charles J. Wertheimer. It then entered the collection of noted art collector Sir Joseph Robinson, and from there to various private collectors.

Cherry Ripe was sold by Sotheby's in 2004, in their 'Important British Pictures' auction. The estimate was £800,000 to £1,200,000, and it sold for £1,000,000.

== The sitter ==
Edie Ramage later married Francisco de Paula Ossorio, and was identified as the sitter in 1958, when the painting was on display in "The Robinson Collection" exhibition the Royal Academy in London. The president of the Royal Academy, Sir Charles Wheeler, took some trouble to track her down. Edith Ossorio visited the painting and told Wheeler some details of the sittings. Wheeler's wife, Muriel, Lady Wheeler, painted a portrait of Ossorio that same year. Ossorio died in 1970 aged 96, and is buried in Budleigh Salterton.

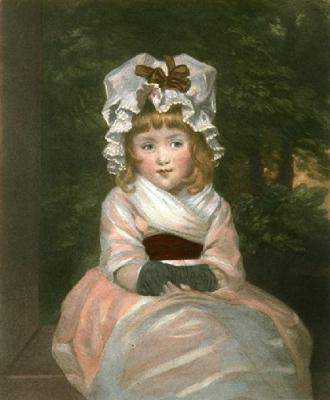
The 1788 portrait of Penelope Boothby by Sir Joshua Reynolds, titled Portrait of Penelope Boothby, or The Mob Cap, on which Cherry Ripe is based. From the collection of the National Gallery, London.

== In popular culture ==
Millais and the Cherry Ripe girl in the cartoon "A Momentary Vision that once Befell Young Millais", in Max Beerbohm's 1922 Rossetti and his Circle.

Max Beerbohm caricatured Millais and Cherry Ripe in the third plate in his Rossetti and his Circle publication of 1922, titled "A Momentary Vision that once Befell Young Millais". In the cartoon, young Millais is working on his Ferdinand Lured by Ariel (1849–1850), while his older self sits in the studio with the Cherry Ripe girl perched on his lap. The cartoon is now in the Tate Gallery.

== See also ==
- List of paintings by John Everett Millais
