= Lady Wheeler =

Lady Wheeler is a title which has been used by several women:

- Margaret Collingridge Wheeler (1916–1990), an Australian archaeologist
- Margaret Wheeler, Baroness Wheeler (b. 1949), a British Labour Party politician
- Muriel Wheeler (1888–1979), a British painter and sculptor
