= Mary Collin =

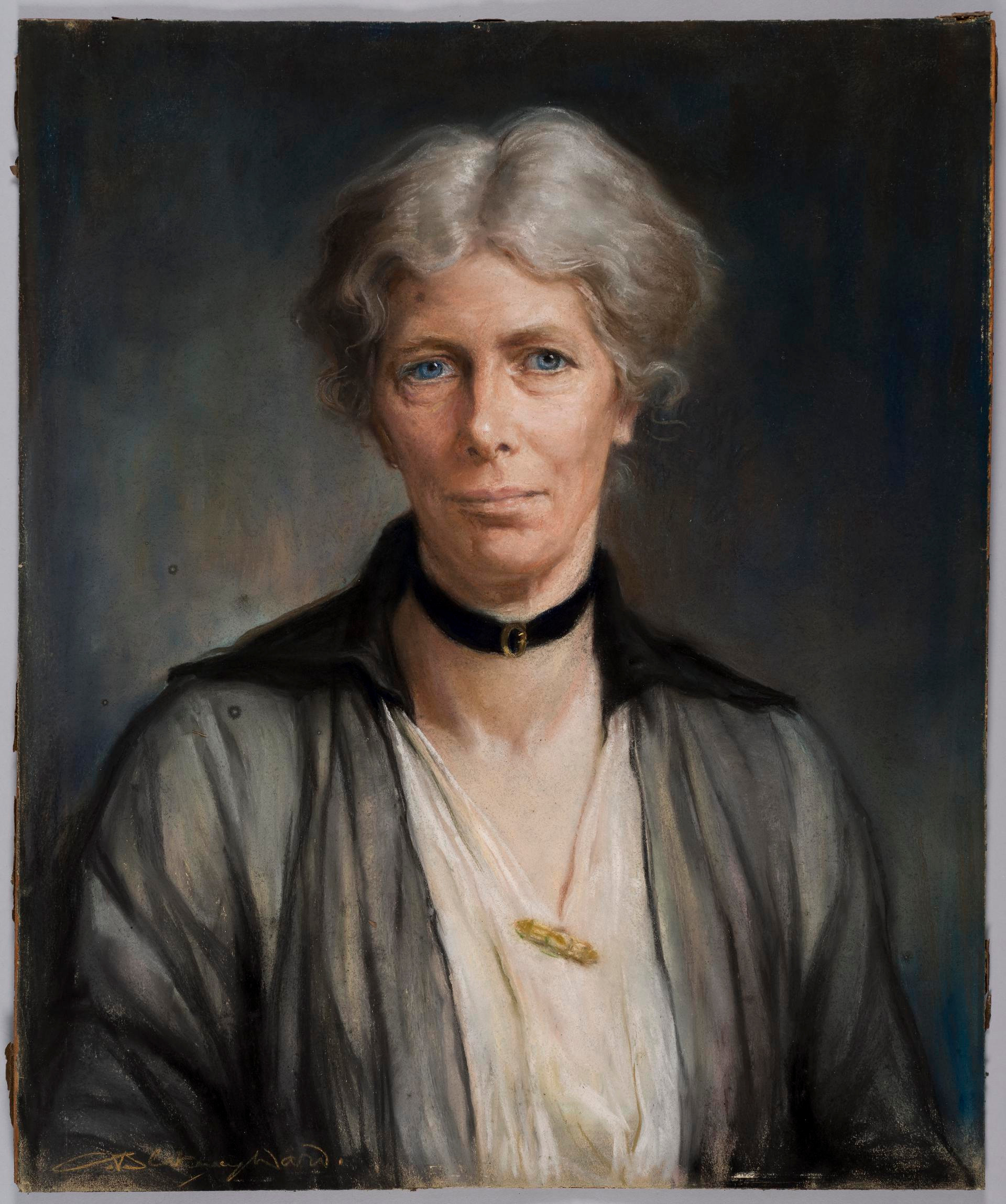
- 1924 portrait by Charlotte Blakeney Ward
- Born: 1 April 1860; Cambridge, England, United Kingdom of Great Britain and Ireland
- Died: 22 July 1955 (aged 95); St David's Hospital, Cardiff, Wales, United Kingdom
- Known for: Head teacher and suffrage leader

Mary Collin (1 April 1860 – 22 July 1955) was an English teacher and campaigner for women's suffrage during the early part of the 20th century. Collin was the Chair of the Cardiff and District Women's Suffrage Society.

== Life ==
Mary Collin was born in Cambridge and educated at Notting Hill High School for Girls, later graduating from Bedford College, London, in French and German. Having spent seven years as Second Mistress at Nottingham High School for Girls, she was appointed head of Cardiff Intermediate School for Girls (later Cardiff High School for Girls) in 1895, when the school first opened; she retained the post until 1924. She gathered well qualified teachers to her school, including Beatrice May Baker, who copied her approach when leading Badminton School to be more progressive. Collin's position in the community enabled her to command respect as a leader of the women's suffrage movement.

As a head teacher, she supported the teaching of mathematics and science to girls, and advocated that school inspectors should themselves have a teaching qualification. A portrait of Miss Collin, by an unknown artist, has been rediscovered at St Fagans National Museum of History and put on display.
