= Fooks =

Fooks is a surname. Notable people with the surname include:

- Ernest Fooks (1906–1985), Australian architect
- Fred Fooks (1880–1958), Australian rules footballer

== See also ==
- Chitlin' Fooks
- Fookes
- Hooks (surname)
