= St Mary Magdalene's Church, St Leonards-on-Sea =

St Mary Magdalene's Church
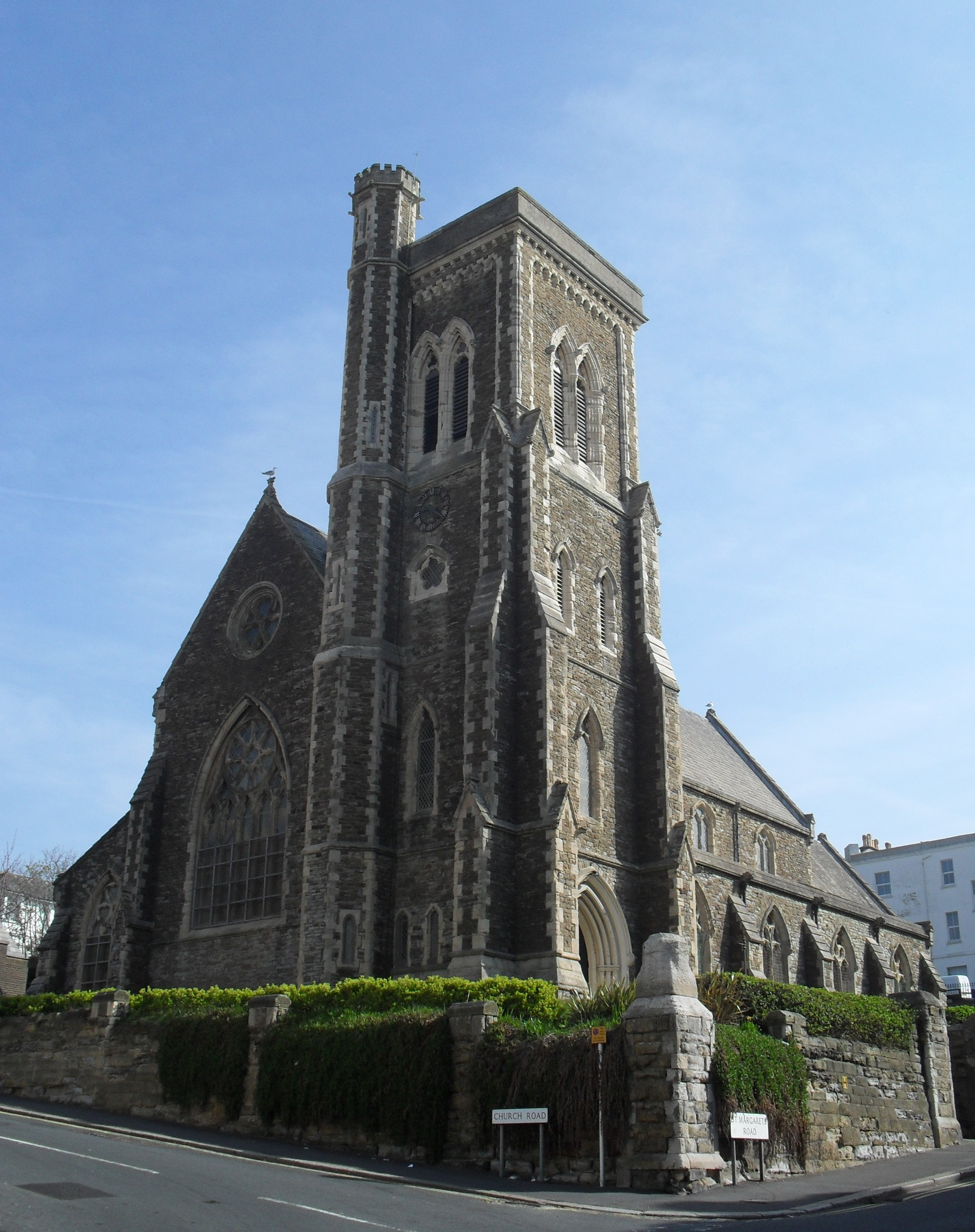
- The church from the southwest
- St Mary Magdalene's Church
- 50.8532°N 0.5650°E
- Location: St Margaret's Road/Church Road, St Leonards-on-Sea, Hastings, East Sussex TN37 6EE
- Country: England
- Denomination: Greek Orthodox

History
- Status: Church
- Founded: 1852
- Dedication: Mary Magdalene
- Events: 1982: Sold to Greek Orthodox community 1983: Reopened as Greek Orthodox church

Architecture
- Functional status: Active
- Heritage designation: Grade II
- Designated: 14 September 1976
- Architect: Frederick Marrable
- Style: Decorated Gothic Revival
- Completed: 1852

Administration
- Archdiocese: Thyateira and Great Britain
- Parish: Hastings and St Leonards

Clergy
- Priest: Rev. Oeconomos Ierotheos Georghiou

St Mary Magdalene's Church is a Greek Orthodox place of worship in St Leonards-on-Sea, a town and seaside resort which is part of the Borough of Hastings in East Sussex, England. Dedicated to Mary Magdalene (one of Jesus' followers) and built in 1852 for Anglican worshippers in the growing new town of St Leonards-on-Sea, a seaside resort which had been laid out from the 1820s, the church's prominent position on the skyline overlooking the town was enhanced in 1872 by the addition of a tower. No longer required by the Anglican community in the 1980s, it was quickly bought by the Greek Orthodox Church and converted into a place of worship in accordance with their requirements. The alterations were minimal, though, and the building retains many of its original fittings and its "archaeologically correct Gothic" exterior which reflected architectural norms of the early Victorian era. English Heritage has listed the church at Grade II for its architectural and historical importance.

== History ==
By the 12th century, Hastings on the English Channel coast was one of Sussex's largest and most important towns. The famous Battle of 1066 took place nearby; a castle was founded; the town operated its own mint; it was the leader of the Cinque Ports; and seven churches existed within its boundaries. The surrounding manors included Gensing, a large and attractive expanse of land running down from a forested valley on to flat agricultural land and a beach immediately west of the town. As Hastings recovered from an 18th-century slump and started to become fashionable and well patronised again in the early 19th century, speculative development was encouraged.

James Burton, a builder and entrepreneur who later fathered the prominent architect Decimus Burton, saw the potential of the Gensing estate land, which was owned by the Eversfield baronets of Denne Park near Horsham, West Sussex. He bought a large section of this manor, including 1,151 yards (1,052 m) of seafront land, for £7,800 in February 1828, and developed a carefully planned new town, St Leonards-on-Sea, on it. Residential, commercial and hotel development was rapid, especially after it was incorporated as a town by an Act of Parliament in 1832 (previously it had been run as a private enterprise by Burton), and the resort soon rivalled neighbouring Hastings in popularity.

Burton provided the town with its first Anglican church, St Leonard's Church, in 1831. The 800-capacity seafront building was consecrated in 1834. After Burton's death in 1837, the town continued to grow in all directions, helped by the opening of St Leonards Warrior Square railway station in 1851. This was close to the square of that name, an early Victorian-era set piece (started in the early 1850s), which helped to push St Leonards-on-Sea's boundaries closer to those of Hastings.

St Leonard's Church, the parish church, was in the western part of the resort, on the seafront road called Marina. This was the only Anglican place of worship in the town, and in 1848 a Roman Catholic place of worship was established near Warrior Square when Augustus Pugin's Convent of the Holy Child Jesus opened its chapel for public worship; so in June 1850 a group of promoters contacted the Incorporated Church Building Society and applied for money to build a new church to serve the eastern part of St Leonards-on-Sea.

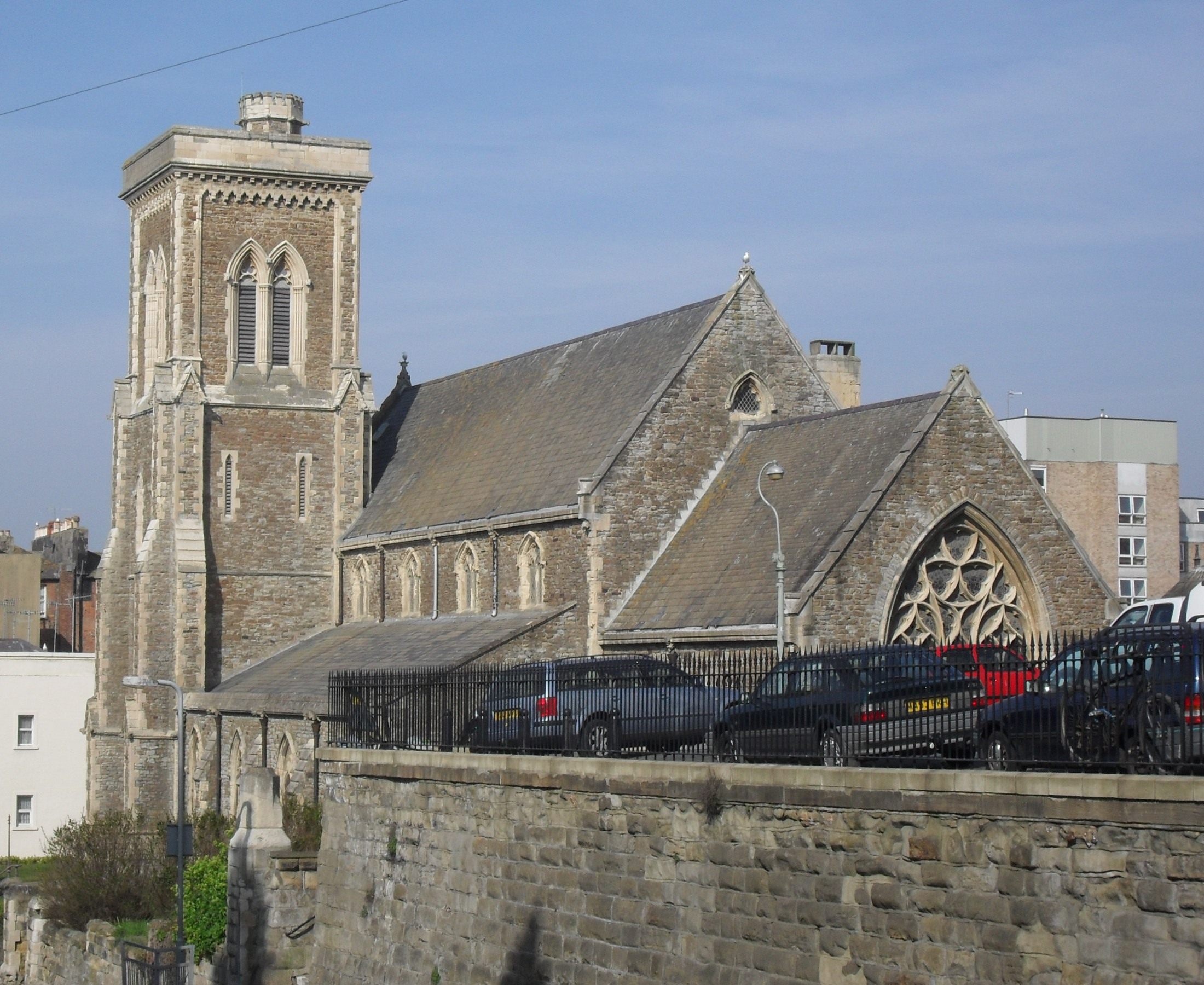
The church was built on a high, sloping site.

The land Burton bought straddled two parish boundaries: St Leonard's and St Mary Magdalene's. St Leonard's was named in reference to one of Hastings' ancient parish churches which apparently vanished by the early 15th century. It belonged to an abbey in Rouen in France before that. St Mary Magdalene's parish, to the east, was first described in 1656, but there was no ancient church of that dedication in the area; instead there was a medieval Hospital of St Mary Magdalene, from which the name may have come. The new church then took the name of this ancient parish.

Charles Eversfield of the Eversfield baronets gave the site for the church—a high, landmark site overlooking Warrior Square. Funding came from the Bishop of Chichester, the vicar of St Leonard's parish church and others. A building committee was assembled to administer the design and construction process. Sir Thomas Smith Marrable was a member, and his son Frederick was commissioned to design the church. Work on the Decorated Gothic-style building started in 1852, and the church opened in that year. It had a capacity of 822 worshippers, split approximately equally between free and paid-for pews. The ecclesiastical parish was officially reconstituted in 1870. The building cost £12,000—expensive for the time.

The plans provided for a tower and a large spire. The latter was never added, but in 1872 a tower was built at the southwest corner. Other work carried out in this year included the addition of an organ chamber (in the form of an apse) and a vestry, and a new east window in the chancel. Stained glass windows by Morris & Co. were added in 1882. A church hall, a simple brick structure, was built on the northwest side in 1935.

The Diocese of Chichester declared the church redundant in 1980. Soon afterwards, it was bought by the local Greek Orthodox community; various sources give 1981, 1982 or 1983 for the year. They installed an iconostasis in 1983 as the central feature of the church.

== Architecture ==
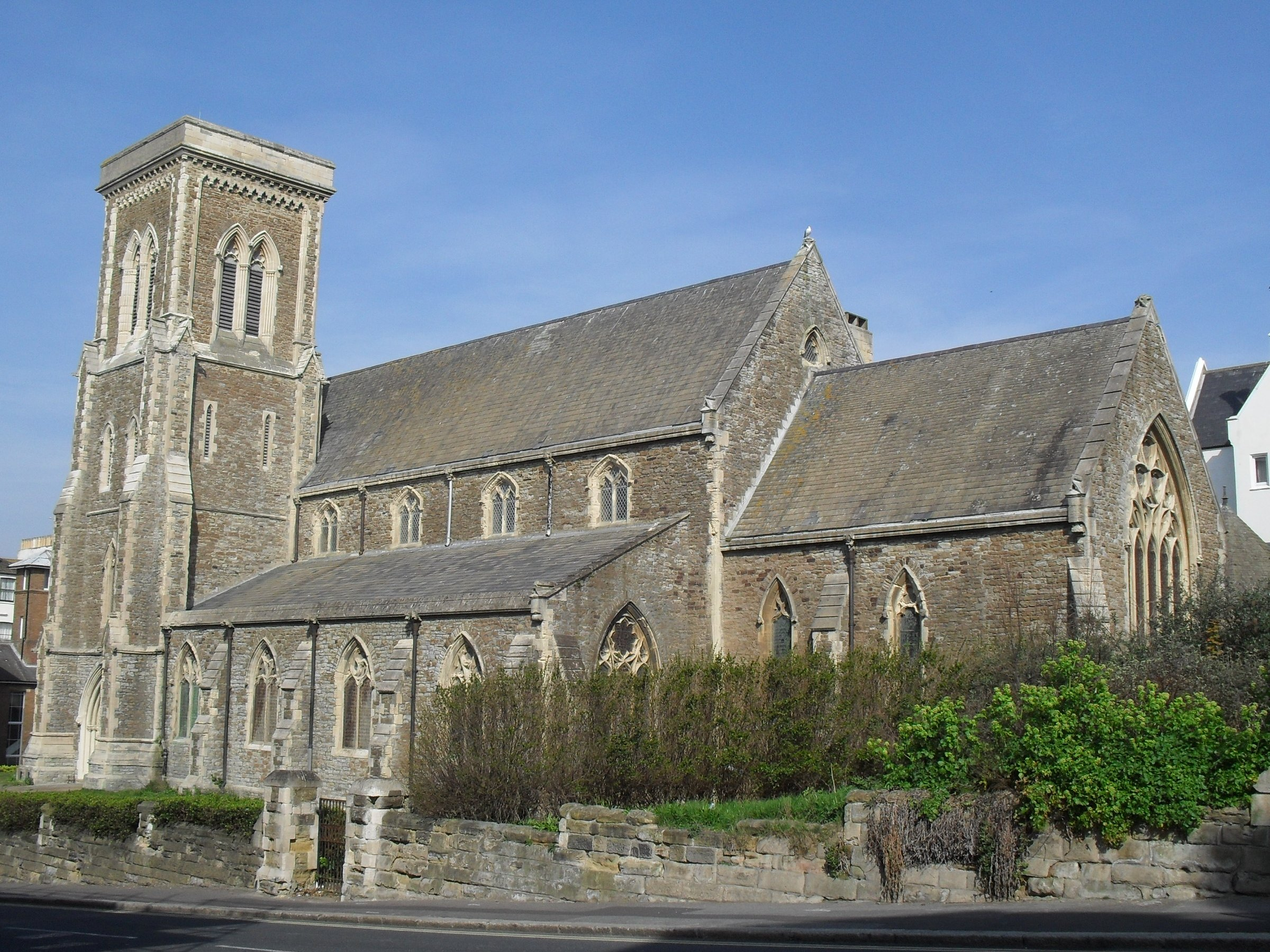
The nave has a clerestory and five-bay aisles.

St Mary Magdalene's Church is an expensively designed, "archaeologically correct" Decorated Gothic Revival church whose design was exactly in accordance with architectural norms of the mid-19th century. As a "large and imposing" building on a prominent, high corner site (a feature typical of the churches of St Leonards-on-Sea and Hastings), it makes a "handsome composition" within the townscape. Another characteristic feature, similar to other local churches, is the extensive use of locally quarried stone. The interior and exterior walls are of sandstone laid in ashlar blocks. The Decorated Gothic Revival design matches the typical style of a 14th-century church.

The plan consists of a clerestoried nave with aisles on the north and south sides, a chancel at a lower level, a buttressed four-stage tower with a beacon-style turret, a porch and a vestry on the north side. The aisles have five bays each and are separated from the nave by arcades. The tower rises from the westernmost bay of the south aisle and has paired lancet windows on each face of its top (bell) stage. The chancel has a hammerbeam roof in a Perpendicular Gothic style.

Writing in 1965, Ian Nairn and Nikolaus Pevsner stated that the interior was "not specially interesting", but several original features remain. Stained glass of the 19th century—some of which was destroyed in bomb attacks in 1943—included examples by Marrable himself, Heaton, Butler and Bayne, William Miller, Clayton and Bell, Edward Burne-Jones and the Morris & Co. window in the south aisle. A three-seat sedilia and adjacent piscina, both with ogee-shaped heads, remain in the south wall, and there is a reredos with a carving of the Last Supper. An ogee-panelled porch and an octagonal font with carvings also survive.

== The church today ==
St Mary Magdalene's Church was listed at Grade II by English Heritage on 14 September 1976. This defines it as a "nationally important" building of "special interest". As of February 2001, it was one of 521 Grade II listed buildings, and 535 listed buildings of all grades, in the borough of Hastings. It is one of several listed churches in St Leonards-on-Sea: the Anglican churches of Christ Church, St Peter's and St John the Evangelist's are classed at the higher Grade II*, while St Leonard's Anglican parish church, St Leonard's Baptist Church and the Roman Catholic Church of St Thomas of Canterbury and English Martyrs, along with the former St Leonards-on-Sea Congregational Church, are also Grade II-listed.

The church is in the Hastings and St Leonards parish of the Archdiocese of Thyateira and Great Britain. It is served by two priests, one of whom also serves the Greek Orthodox Church of St Panteleimon and St Theodore in the nearby seaside resort of Eastbourne. This was converted from a Calvinistic Independent Baptist chapel built in 1857. Similarly, the Greek Orthodox Church of the Holy Trinity in the Carlton Hill area of Brighton was converted from a redundant Anglican church in 1985.

The church is licensed for worship in accordance with the Places of Worship Registration Act 1855 and has the registration number 79948.

== See also ==
- List of places of worship in Hastings
- St. George's Episcopal Memorial Church, a church in the US with a stained glass window containing shards of glass collected from this church when it was damaged in World War II.

== Bibliography ==
- Body, Geoffrey (1984). Railways of the Southern Region. PSL Field Guides. Cambridge: Patrick Stephens Ltd. ISBN 0-85059-664-5.
- Elleray, D. Robert (1979). Hastings: a Pictorial History. Chichester: Phillimore & Co. ISBN 0-85033-324-5.
- Elleray, D. Robert (1981). The Victorian Churches of Sussex. Chichester: Phillimore & Co. Ltd. ISBN 0-85033-378-4.
- Elleray, D. Robert (2004). Sussex Places of Worship. Worthing: Optimus Books. ISBN 0-9533132-7-1.
- Manwaring Baines, J. (1990) [1956]. Burton's St Leonards (2nd ed.). Hastings: Hastings Museum.
- Nairn, Ian; Pevsner, Nikolaus (1965). The Buildings of England: Sussex. Harmondsworth: Penguin Books. ISBN 0-14-071028-0.
- Salzman, L.F., ed. (1973) [1937]. A History of Sussex. The Victoria Histories of the Counties of England. Vol. 9. Folkestone: Dawsons of Pall Mall (originally Oxford: Oxford University Press). ISBN 0-7129-0590-1.
