= Robert Jackson Emerson =

English sculptor

- Born: 21 June 1878; Rothley, Leicestershire, England
- Died: 7 December 1944 (aged 66); England
- Known for: Sculpture

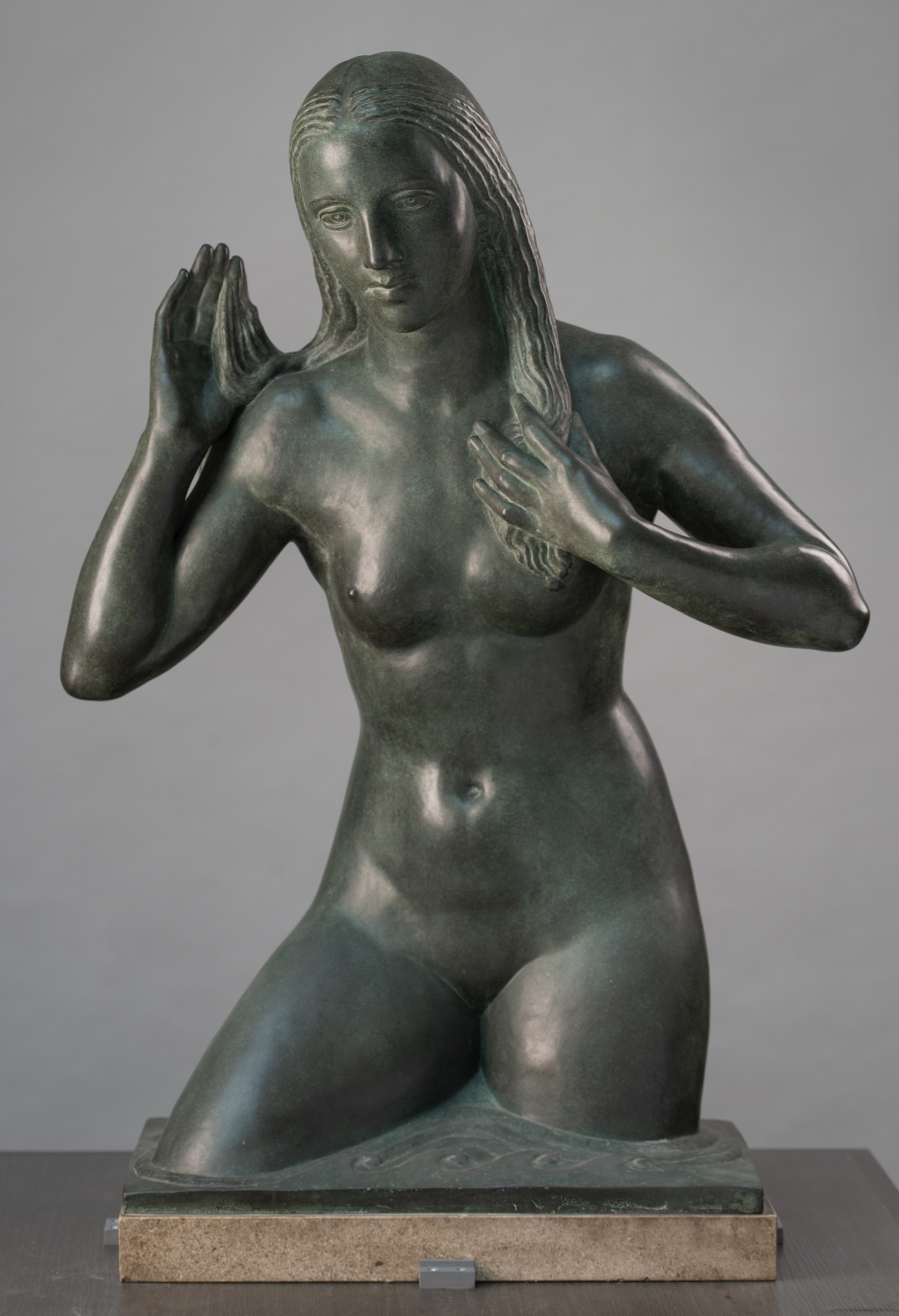
Nausicaa by Emerson

Robert Jackson Emerson (21 June 1878 – 7 December 1944) was an English sculptor and teacher. He is commemorated in the only blue plaque in Rothley, put in place in 2015.

== Biography ==
Robert Emerson was born in Rothley, Leicestershire in 1878, his mother from a family of stone workers. Following apprenticeship in a boot and shoe factory, his artistic education involved study at the Leicester College of Art, following encouragement from his headmaster, which required him to walk 14 miles daily. He also trained in London.

Gaining his Art Master's Teaching Certificate in 1901, Emerson began teaching part-time. He won several awards in art allowing him to undergo further studies in Rouen and Paris. working for a firm of art metalworkers.

Emerson was appointed as second master at the Wolverhampton School of Art in 1910, a role which he undertook alongside his own private practice. In 1934, Emerson become a Professor of Sculpture at the Royal Birmingham Society of Artists. In 1937, he was appointed to the British School at the Rome Faculty of Sculpture and retired from teaching in 1942, continuing to work until dying due to poor health in 1944. Among his pupils was the sculptor Charles Wheeler.
