= Constance Bradshaw =

British artist

Constance Helen Bradshaw
- Born: 1872; Manchester, England
- Died: 1961 (aged 88–89); Bickley, Kent
- Education: Spenlove School of Art
- Known for: Landscape painting

Constance Helen Bradshaw (1872–1961) was a British landscape painter and artist.

== Biography ==
Bradshaw was born in Manchester but was raised in Brighton and at Bickley in Kent and studied at the Spenlove School of Art in London. After leaving art school Bradshaw returned to Bickley, where she spent most of the rest of her life, although she did travel extensively in Europe and Canada. She painted landscapes and flowers in watercolours and oils and created hand-painted prints. Between 1924 and 1945 Bradshaw was a regular exhibitor at the Royal Academy in London, with the Royal Glasgow Institute of the Fine Arts and with the Royal Institute of Oil Painters. She also took part in exhibitions of the New English Art Club and at the Paris Salon, in Stockholm and also in New Zealand and Canada. Throughout her career, from 1899 to 1962, Bradshaw was active in the Society of Women Artists both as an exhibitor, showing a total of 170 works and serving as the society's Acting President, alongside Laura Knight, from 1937 to 1939. She was elected a member of the Royal Society of British Artists in 1920, was an elected member of the Royal Institute of Oil Painters from 1933 and was also a member of the St Ives Society of Artists. Salford Museum and Art Gallery holds examples of her paintings.
