= Mabel Wickham =

English painter

Mabel Frances Wickham (1901 in Fleet, Hampshire – 1992) was a British artist and landscape painter. She studied art at the Clapham High School from 1919 to 1923 and went on to teach art at Lord Digby’s School, Sherborne. By the early 1930s she had opted to teach part-time so as to develop her own painting. For some 14 years Wickham attended summer landscape painting courses run by Reginald St Clair Marston. She was made an associate of the Society of Women Artists in 1936 and elected to the Royal Institute of Painters in Water Colours in 1938. Wickham was a member of the Sherborne Art Club. She moved to Weymouth, Dorset where she ran her own summer art courses. There was a retrospective at Chesil Gallery, Chiswell in 1988 and an exhibition at Dorset County Museum, Dorchester, who hold several of her studio works.
