= Lota Bowen =

British artist (1872–1935)

Lota Bowen (1872–1935) was a British painter. She was a member of the Society of Women Artists (and its sometime president), the Society of Painters in Tempera, and the 91 Art Club, a Chelsea club for women artists. Born in Armley, Yorkshire, she studied in Ludovici's studio London; later in Rome under Santoro and in the night classes of the Circolo Artistico. Her pictures are principally landscapes and mainly in private collections. Among the most noted are: On the Venetian Lagoons; Old Stone Pines, Lido, Venice; Evening on Lake Lugano; Evening Glow Dolomites; The Old Bird Fancier; and Moonrise on Crowborough, Sussex; all exhibited at the Royal Academy. She also painted portraits and figure subjects and was noted for her "broad swinging brush and great love of 'tone'".
