= Muriel Wheeler =

British artist and sculptor

Muriel Wheeler, Lady Wheeler, née Bourne (1888–1979) was a British artist and sculptor.

== Life ==
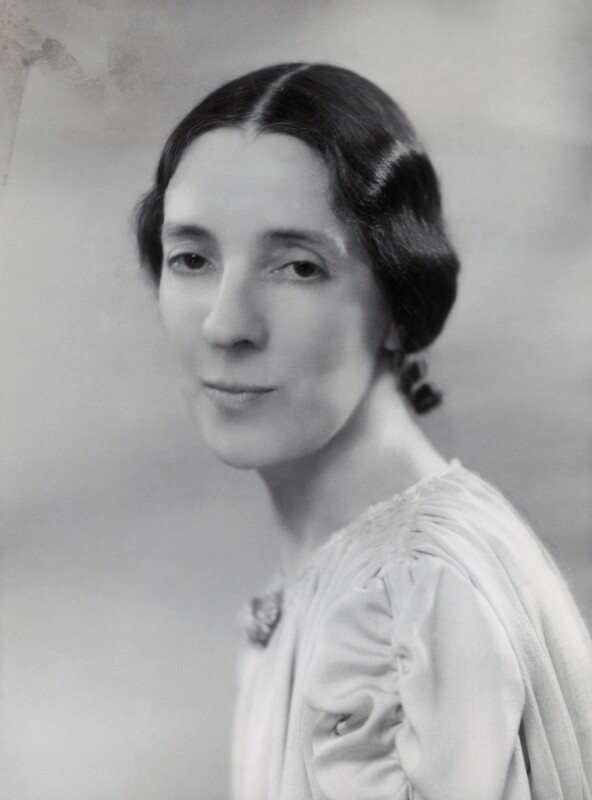
Muriel Wheeler, Lady Wheeler, née Bourne (1888–1979), in a May 1939 studio portrait photograph by Bassano Ltd. From the collection of the National Portrait Gallery, London.

Wheeler was born in Shrewsbury, and the Bourne family later moved to Wolverhampton for her father's job as canal superintendent. She studied art with a private tutor, and from c. 1909–1912 she was a student at Wolverhampton School of Art, under the tutelage of Robert Jackson Emerson and others. Here she met her future husband, Charles Wheeler (1892–1974). They married in 1918, in St. Peter's Church, Wolverhampton after Charles had won a £100 second prize in a national competition.

Wheeler worked after her marriage, both creating her own art and as a model for her husband. She exhibited her work at the Royal Academy in 1919 under her maiden name, Muriel Bourne, and after that under her married name. She also exhibited at the Royal Institute of Oil Painters, the Royal Institute of Painters in Water Colours, the Royal Society of Miniature Painters, Sculptors and Gravers, the Royal Society of Portrait Painters, the Royal Birmingham Society of Artists, the Royal Glasgow Institute of the Fine Arts, Walker Art Gallery, Liverpool, Leeds City Art Gallery, the New English Art Club, and at the Society of Women Artists. Her focus changed mainly to sculpture from 1925 onwards.

Wheeler was elected an associate of the Royal Society of Sculptors (RBS) in 1942, and became a full member in 1946. She served for two years on the RBS Council. She was elected a member of the Society of Women Artists in 1935, and was its acting president from 1951 to 1967, and its president from 1968 to 1976. She was also the president of the Ridley Art Society and St James’ Art Society.

The Wheelers lived in London (21 Tregunter Road, Chelsea), and in later life at Weavers, Warwickswold, Merstham, Surrey (1948–1968), and then at Woodreed Farmhouse, Five Ashes, near Mayfield, East Sussex. They had two children, Carol and Robin, who appear in the 1933 painting Self and Family. Charles was knighted in 1958, after which time Muriel was styled Lady Wheeler.

In his 1968 autobiography High Relief, Charles Wheeler described his wife as being "very slender and straight like a young willow...long dark hair hanging down the back to her waist and an ivory oval face with large eyes".

Wheeler died in 1979 and is buried next to her husband in the graveyard of St Nicholas' Church, Codsall, Staffordshire. Charles was born in the village.

== Selected works by Wheeler ==
- 1931. Sir Charles Thomas Wheeler, lead bust, National Portrait Gallery, London.
- 1933. Self and Family, oil painting, private collection.
- 1939. The Christ Child, metal sculpture, Wolverhampton Art Gallery.
- 1958. Edith Ossorio, oil painting, private collection. Ossorio was the sitter for the 1879 painting Cherry Ripe, by John Everett Millais.
- 1959. Dancing on the Shore, oil painting, private collection.
- 1972. Henry Edmeadas Baker (1905–1994), in His Robes as Master of the Worshipful Company of Plumbers, oil painting, Owletts.
- n.d. (1919–1945) Mother and Child, pewter and stone sculpture, Newport Museum and Art Gallery.
- n.d. Sir Charles Wheeler, oil painting, Wolverhampton Art Gallery.
- n.d. Carol Wheeler as a Baby Sucking her Toe, bronze sculpture, Owletts.

== Depictions of Wheeler by others ==
- 1918: Double portrait bronze medallion by Robert Jackson Emerson commemorating her marriage to Charles Wheeler, Wolverhampton Art Gallery.
- 1934: Gilt bronze portrait bust by Charles Wheeler, Wolverhampton Art Gallery.
- 1939: Photographic portrait by Bassano Ltd, National Portrait Gallery, London.

== Sources ==
- 1947. British Sculpture 1944–1946, Eric Newton. London: Tiranti.
