= William Luson Thomas =

British wood-engraver and newspaper founder (1830–1900)

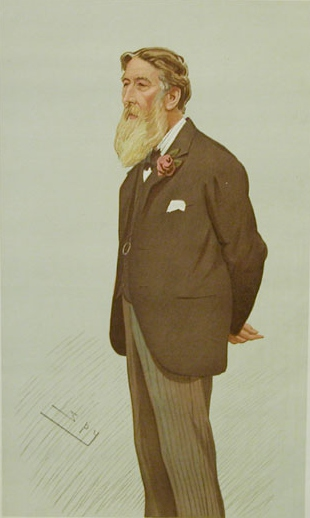
"The Graphics" Thomas as caricatured by Spy (Leslie Ward) in Vanity Fair, December 1894

William Luson Thomas (London 4 December 1830–1900) was a British wood-engraver and the founder of various British newspapers.

== Biography ==
Thomas worked as a wood-engraver in Paris and was also an assistant to the British wood-engraver William James Linton.

Thomas was a friend of Charles Dickens and believed in social reform. At one time he worked for the Illustrated London News, and became convinced that pictures could have a powerful influence on public opinion, especially on political issues.

In December 1869 he co-founded a new weekly illustrated newspaper, called The Graphic with his brother Lewis Samuel Thomas (d. 1872). Important to the project was the recruitment of a number of brilliant artists to help illustrate it including Godefroy Durand who moved from Paris to London to work for the newspaper full time. In 1889, Thomas and his company H. R. Baines & Co. began publishing the first daily illustrated newspaper, called The Daily Graphic. He hoped that illustrated news would inspire people to campaign against various evils in Victorian society, including poverty and crime. His newspapers achieved a significant readership throughout the British Empire and in the United States.

When Thomas died in 1900, his company H.R. Baines & Co. was run by his son, Carmichael Thomas. The Graphic ceased publication in 1932.

Thomas' seventh son George Holt Thomas was a director and general manager of The Graphic and who (in addition) independently founded The Bystander and Empire Illustrated magazines. He also became a pioneer industrialist in the aviation industry.

In 1879 Thomas commissioned artist John Everett Millais to paint Thomas' four-year-old niece Edie Ramage, in the famous painting Cherry Ripe. The novelist Hugh Stowell Scott was a nephew of Thomas's.
