= Charlotte Blakeney Ward =

English artist

Charlotte Blakeney Ward (1873–1962) was an English artist, best known as a portrait painter. She worked in several media and genres, and is known to have exhibited between 1898 and 1939.

She was born in Eccles, Lancashire, the daughter of journalist James Blakeney. She was educated privately at home and later studied at the Royal College of Art. She also studied in Paris, and exhibited at the Paris Salon in 1900.

She married a fellow portrait artist, Charles Daniel Ward. Her portrait subjects included the suffragist Mary Collin, the poet Robinson Jeffers, and several members of the nobility. Her work was exhibited at the Royal Academy.

In 1923, she became President of the Society of Women Artists, having been vice president since 1917, and held the presidency until 1931.
