= Red Hat Society =

International social organization for older women

The Red Hat Society, Inc.
- Logo for the Red Hat Society
- Formation: 1998
- Type: Social organization
- Headquarters: Fullerton, California
- Members: 35,000+
- Chief Executive Officer: Debra Granich
- Founder & Exalted Queen Mother: Sue Ellen Cooper
- Website: redhatsociety.com

The Red Hat Society (RHS) is an international social organization that was founded in 1998 in the United States for women age 50 and over, but now open to women of all ages.

== History ==
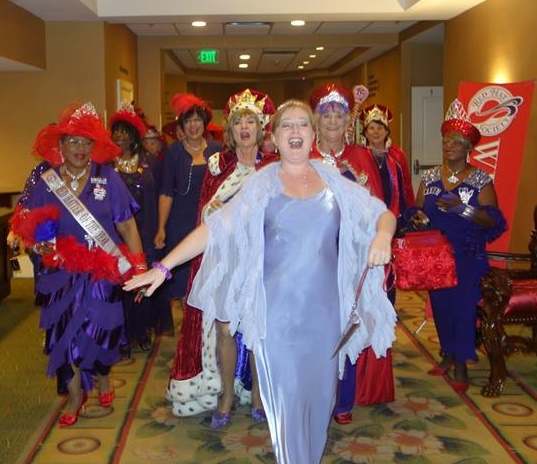
The Royal Court of Queens Processional at a conference, 2014

In the fall of 1997, Sue Ellen Cooper, an artist from Fullerton, California, bought a red hat on a trip to Tucson, Arizona. Cooper then bought another red hat and gave it to a friend as a birthday gift. Cooper was inspired by the Jenny Joseph poem, "Warning", which was popularized by a Reader's Digest article written by Liz Carpenter. The poem begins: "When I am an old woman, I shall wear purple, with a red hat which doesn't go and doesn't suit me." Cooper wanted to encourage her friend to grow older in a playful manner. Cooper repeated the gift to several other friends upon request, and eventually several of the women bought purple outfits and held a tea party on April 25, 1998, at which the Red Hat Society began.

The society first gained national attention through an article written by journalist Lori Basheda for The Orange County Register, which was reprinted in newspapers across the country.

Cooper facilitated the growth of the organization and now serves as "Exalted Queen Mother" of the organization. She has written two books about the society: The Red Hat Society: Friendship and Fun After Fifty (2004) and The Red Hat Society's Laugh Lines: Stories of Inspiration and Hattitude (2005).

As of 2020, Red Hat Society membership has more than 35,000 members internationally.

== Organization ==
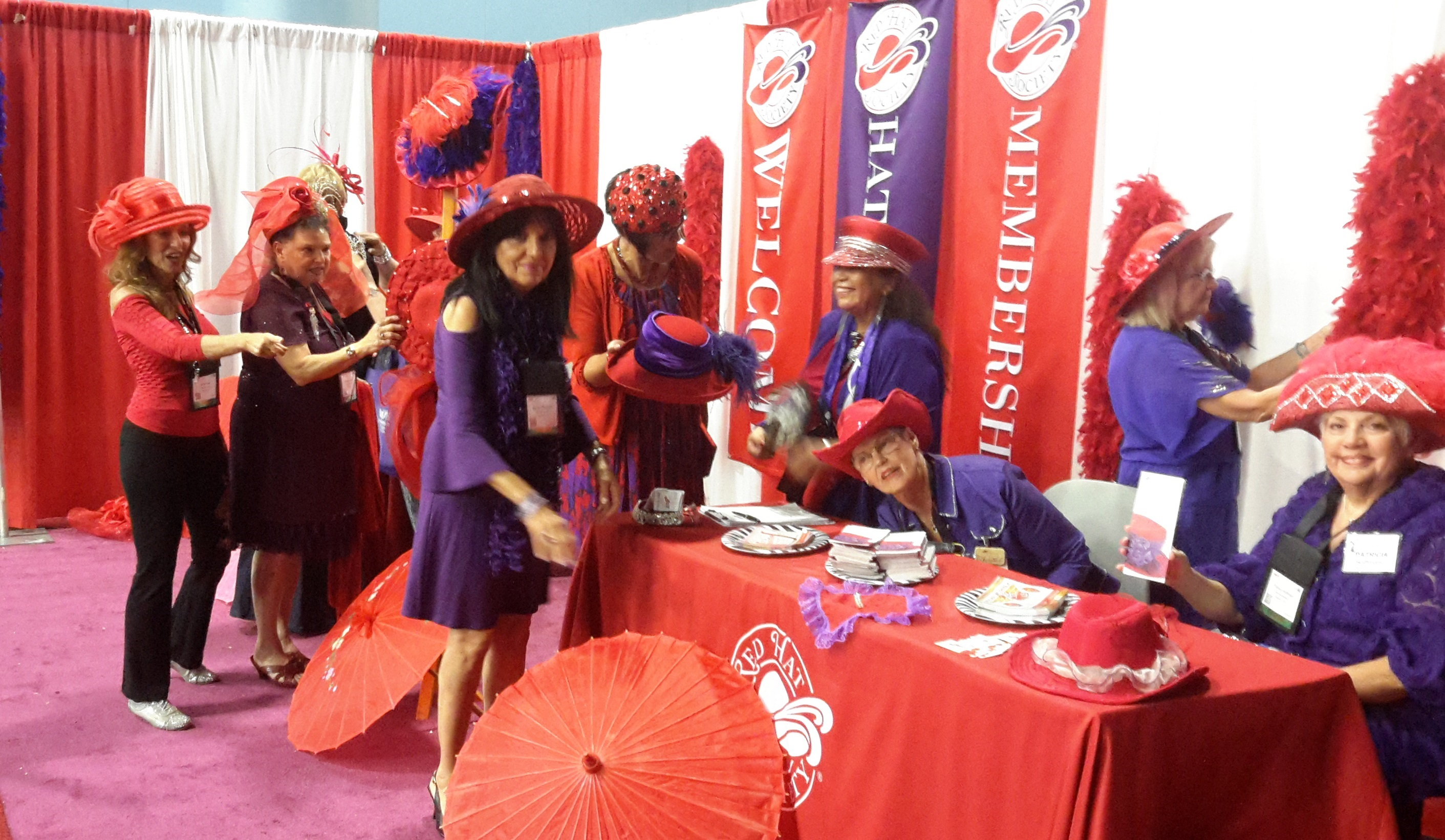
The Red Hat Society booth at the AARP convention in Miami in 2015

A founder or leader of a local chapter is usually referred to as a "Queen". Members 50 and over are called "Red Hatters" and wear red hats and purple attire to all functions. A woman under age 50 may also become a member, but she wears a pink hat and lavender attire to the society's events until reaching her 50th birthday. She is referred to as a "Pink Hatter". During her birthday month (or the society's birthday month of April), a member might wear her colors in reverse, i.e., a purple or lavender hat and red or pink attire.

== Activities ==
Both Red and Pink Hatters often wear very elaborately decorated hats and attention-getting fashion accessories, such as a feather boa, at the group's get-togethers.

The society's events vary depending on the chapter, but common activities among Red Hatters include hosting tea parties, playing games, and going to movies or theater events.

== Worldwide membership ==
The Red Hat Society has spread to other countries in the world. As of 2011, besides the thousands of chapters in the U.S., there were local chapters of the Society in Argentina, Australia, Austria, Canada, Ecuador, England, Finland, Germany, Greece, Guam, Ireland, Italy, Luxembourg, Mexico, Namibia, The Netherlands, New Zealand, Norway, Panama, Peru, Puerto Rico, Scotland, South Africa, Sweden, Taiwan, Trinidad and Tobago, and Wales.
