= Emily Murray Paterson =

Scottish artist (1855–1934)

- Born: 10 October 1855; Edinburgh, Scotland
- Died: 23 July 1934 (aged 78); London, England
- Education: Edinburgh College of Art
- Known for: Painting

Emily Murray Paterson RSW SWA (1855–1934) was a Scottish artist, connected with the Glasgow School and member of the Society of Women Artists.

== Life and work ==
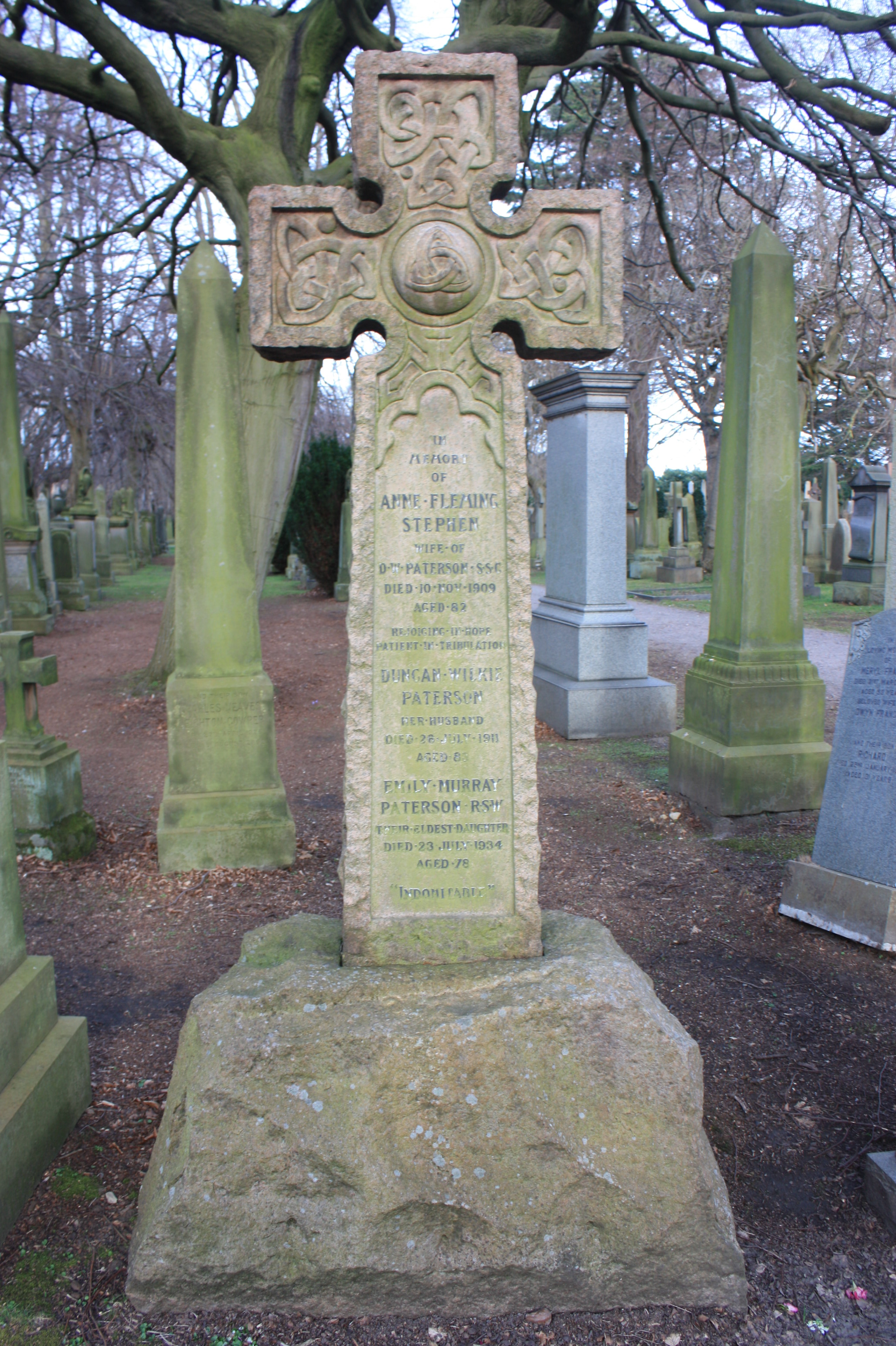
The grave of Emily Murray Paterson, Dean Cemetery, Edinburgh

Emily Paterson was born in Edinburgh, Scotland in 1855. Her father, Duncan Wilkie Paterson SSC (1827–1911) was a solicitor from Ayrshire. He was a partner of Lindsay & Paterson at 24 Dublin Street in Edinburgh. Her mother was Anne Fleming Stephen (1827–1909).

Emily studied at the Edinburgh College of Art as well as in Paris and lived at Albyn Place, Edinburgh before moving to London in 1917. She travelled widely between 1909 and 1934. Shortly after the end of World War One, she visited the former battlefields at Ypres in Belgium. Her watercolours of ruined churches and other destroyed buildings from there, including views of the Ypres Cloth Hall, were shown in London in 1919. Paterson also visited the Netherlands and Italy on a number of occasions and was a keen Alpine walker, often making painting trips to both the Tyrol and Swiss Alps and exhibiting the resulting works at the Alpine Club in London. Her favoured subjects were landscapes, architecture and botany. She was elected member of the Royal Scottish Watercolour Society, Scottish Artists' Society and the Society of Women Artists.

Paterson died in London on 23 July 1934 – a memorial exhibition was held at Walker's Gallery, London later the same year.

She was returned to Edinburgh for burial with her parents in Dean Cemetery. The grave faces the small western entrance and is designed by Stewart McGlashan & Co.

== Exhibitions ==
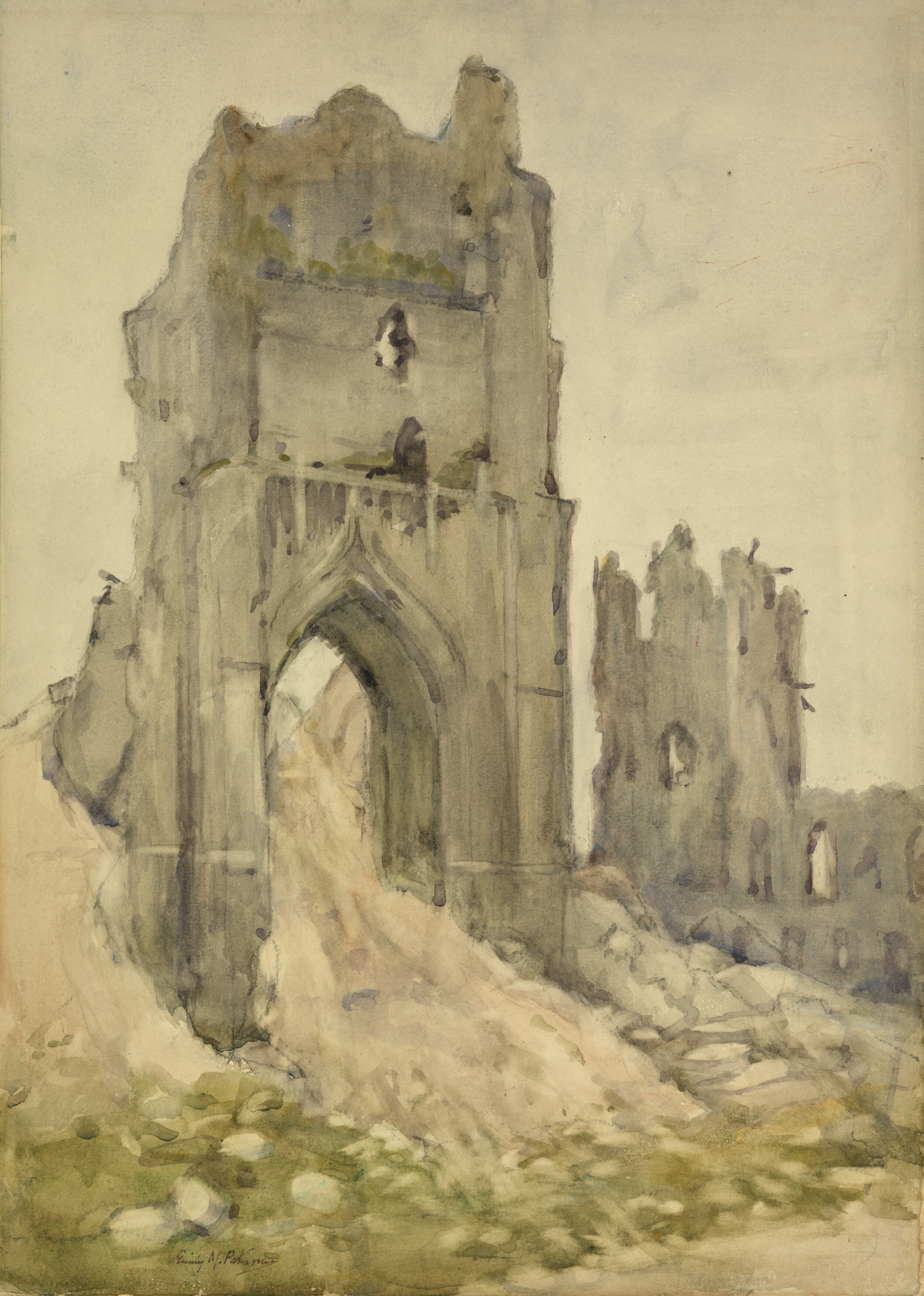
East Entrance, St Martin's Cathedral, Ypres (1919) (Art.IWM ART4758)

Paintings exhibited at the Royal Academy, London

- 1909 – The Giudecca, Venice
- 1910 – The Church, Dordrecht
- 1911 – Ponte del Canonica, Venice
- 1911 – Noon: St Mark's, Venice
- 1913 – Edge of the wood
- 1913 – The green ship, Venice
- 1914 – In Picardy
- 1914 – San Gregorio, Venice
- 1916 – Wengen: winter
- 1916 – Winter: Hyde Park
- 1918 – Bernese Oberland
- 1926 – The windmill on the Maas, Dordrecht
- 1927 – A bouquet
- 1928 – A bouquet of flower
- 1929 – Begonias
- 1930 – Roses
- 1934 – The Church, Dordrecht

== Collections ==
Her work can be found in many public and private collections including the Imperial War Museum, Manchester Art Gallery, Brighton Museum & Art Gallery, Ulster Museum, Wolverhampton Art Gallery and the McLean Museum and Art Gallery.
