= Society of Painters in Tempera =

The Society of Painters in Tempera was founded in 1901 by Christiana Herringham (1852–1929) and a group of British painters who were interested in reviving the art of tempera painting. Lady Herringham was an expert copyist of the Italian Old Masters and had translated Il Libro dell' Arte o Trattato della Pittura, Cennino Cennini's fifteenth-century handbook on fresco and tempera. The artist John Dickson Batten (1860–1932) was the Society's principal organiser and also its Honorary Secretary.

In 1904, members of the Society were: Edwin Austin Abbey, Robert Bateman, John Dickson Batten, his wife Mary Batten, Robert Anning Bell, Lota Bowen, John Cooke, Walter Crane, Louis Davis, Mary Sargant Florence and Roger Fry. Other notable members included Bernard Sleigh, Joseph Southall and Estella Canziani.

The Society, which was also referred to as the Society of Mural Decorators and Painters in Tempera, published a number of papers on the subject of tempera painting which have been edited in three volumes.

After going into decline, the Society was revived in 1997 as the Society of Tempera Painters and is now established in the United States of America and the United Kingdom.
