= Britain–Australia Society =

London-based friendship society

- Formation: 1971; 55 years ago
- Founder: Lord Carington
- Headquarters: Australia House, London
- President: William Hague
- Chairman of the Board: Damian J. Walsh
- Website: www.britain-australia.org.uk

The Britain–Australia Society was established in 1971 to promote historic and contemporary links between the United Kingdom and Australia. Its London headquarters is in the Australia Centre within Australia House. It has other branches throughout the United Kingdom.

== History ==
In 1971, Sir Robert Menzies and Sir Alec Douglas-Home, former Prime Ministers of Australia and the United Kingdom, re-founded the pre-existing Australia Club to form two apolitical and non-commercial societies, based in the United Kingdom and Australia.

== Events ==
A primary activity is organising events including diplomatic dinners, seminars and social gatherings. The West Country branch arranges an annual service of remembrance and lunch in Bath, England, honouring the memory of Admiral Arthur Phillip.

== Awards ==
The Society grants an occasional Britain–Australia Society Award to recognise a person who has been recognized for contributing to the relations between the United Kingdom and Australia. Past recipients have been Barry Humphries, Lord Hague, Kylie Minogue, David Attenborough, Lord Carrington, and Samantha Cohen.

== Structure ==
Branches are maintained in Cambridgeshire, Suffolk, Norfolk, Leicestershire, Lincolnshire, Portsmouth, and the West Country. Regional functions are held by these branches in addition to centrally-organised activities.

The Patron of the Society was The Prince Philip, Duke of Edinburgh. The President is William Jefferson Hague, Baron Hague of Richmond (the founding President was Lord Carrington). Since March 2019, the chairman is Damian Walsh

=== Vice Presidents ===
- The High Commissioner for Australia – ex officio
- Peter Benson
- Brian Harris
- Sir Roger Carrick
- Rohan Courtney
- The Lord Goodlad
- Michael Whalley

=== Honorary Vice-presidents ===
- Dale Eaton
- The Baroness Liddell of Coatdyke
- Sylvia Countess of Limerick
- George Vestey

Deceased:

- Margaret Thatcher
- June Mendoza
- Barry Tuckwell

=== CEO ===
- Louise Mulley

== Sponsors ==
The administration and events are funded by membership subscriptions, management fees and corporate sponsors, including Australian Government agencies and businesses and organisations with an Australian interest in the United Kingdom or a British interest in Australia.

== Affiliates ==
Three charitable trusts are maintained by the society:

- The Britain–Australia Society Educational Trust provides sponsorship for both countries.
- The Northcote Trust funds postgraduate scholarships to Australia.
- The Royal Flying Doctor Service – Friends in the UK.

Australian Britain–Australia Society members have reciprocal rights when in Britain, and vice versa.
