= Jenny Joseph =

British poet (1932–2018)

- Born: 7 May 1932; Birmingham, England
- Died: 8 January 2018 (aged 85)
- Education: Badminton School, Bristol; St Hilda's College, Oxford
- Occupation: Poet
- Spouse: Charles Anthony (Tony) Coles (m. 1961, separated)
- Children: 3
- Writing career
- Language: English
- Notable work: "Warning"

Jenny Joseph FRSL (7 May 1932 – 8 January 2018) was an English poet, best known for the poem "Warning".

== Early life and education ==
When I am an old woman I shall wear purple
With a red hat which doesn't go, and doesn't suit me.
And I shall spend my pension on brandy and summer gloves
And satin sandals, and say we've no money for butter.
I shall sit down on the pavement when I'm tired
And gobble up samples in shops and press alarm bells
And run my stick along the public railings
And make up for the sobriety of my youth.

— From "Warning" (1961)

Jenny Joseph was born on 7 May 1932 in South Hill, Carpenter Road, Edgbaston, Birmingham, to Florence (née Cotton) and Louis Joseph, an antiques dealer. The family were non-observant Jews. Her father's career led to the family relocating to Buckinghamshire, and Joseph was evacuated to Devon early during the Second World War. She later credited this experience with her fascination with the changing light.

She attended Badminton School in Bristol. She won a scholarship to study English literature at St Hilda's College, Oxford (1950).

== Career ==
Her poems were first published when she was at university in the early 1950s. She became a journalist and worked for the Bedfordshire Times, the Oxford Mail and Drum Publications (Johannesburg, South Africa).

Her first book of poems, The Unlooked-for Season, won a Gregory Award in 1960, and she won a Cholmondeley Award in 1974 for her second collection, Rose in the Afternoon, published by J.M. Dent, London.

== "Warning" ==
Joseph's best known poem, "Warning", was written in 1961 when she was 28. First published in The Listener in 1962, "Warning" was later included in her 1974 collection Rose In the Afternoon, in The Oxford Book of Twentieth Century English Verse, and in her Selected Poems (1992).

The poem became well known in America after Liz Carpenter (formerly the first woman executive assistant to Vice President Lyndon Baines Johnson and Press Secretary to former First Lady Lady Bird Johnson), wrote an article for the Reader's Digest in the early 1980s, about enjoying life having recovered from an illness, closing the article with "Warning". The poem was adopted by the greeting-card industry, led by graphic designer and calligrapher Elizabeth Lucas. Joseph ascribed the popularity of the poem to Lucas. "To her business acumen and energy I owe a hospitable following in California and later throughout northern America, more social, as I said, than literary.

"Warning" was identified as the UK's "most popular post-war poem" in a 1996 poll by the BBC.

The opening lines "When I am an old woman I shall wear purple, With a red hat which doesn't go, and doesn't suit me" were the inspiration for the Red Hat Society.

Due to its popularity, an illustrated gift edition of "Warning", first published by Souvenir Press Ltd in 1997, has now been reprinted 41 times. "Warning" was included in the anthology Tools of the Trade: Poems for new doctors (Scottish Poetry Library, 2014) and a copy was given to all graduating doctors in Scotland in 2014.

Joseph herself hated the colour purple, which is why she included it in the poem.

In 2021, the Bodleian Libraries in Oxford announced that the one millionth image from their collections to be digitised by the Digital Bodleian project was Joseph's first draft of "Warning".

== Personal life ==
In 1961, Joseph married Charles Anthony (Tony) Coles. The couple had three children – Martin, Nel and Bec – and ran the Greyhound, a west London pub. She moved to the Cotswold village of Minchinhampton near Stroud in her fifties where she continued writing poetry, as well as gardening and tending to her allotment. In her later years due to ill health she moved to Swansea to be nearer some of her family and is buried in the woodland burial grounds of Oystermouth cemetery.

== Awards and honours ==
- 1960: Gregory Award for Unlooked-for Season
- 1974: Cholmondeley Award for Rose in the Afternoon
- 1986: James Tait Black Memorial Prize for her fiction Persephone
- 1995: Travelling scholarship by the Society of Authors
- 1999: Fellowship of the Royal Society of Literature in 1999

== Bibliography ==
- Unlooked-for Season (1960 – winner of a Gregory Award)
- Rose in the Afternoon (1974 – winner of a Cholmondeley Award)
- The Thinking Heart (1978)
- Beyond Descartes (1983)
- Persephone (1986 – fiction in verse and prose)
- Beached Boats (1992 – prose)
- The Inland Sea (1992)
- Selected Poems (1992) – which includes ("Warning")
- Ghosts and Other Company (1996)
- Extended Similes (1997 – prose fiction)
- Warning (1997, illustrated gift edition)
- All the Things I See (2000)
- Led by the Nose (2002)
- Extreme of Things (2006)
- Nothing Like Love (2009)

== Commemoration ==
The Oxford Dictionary of National Biography published an entry for Jenny Joseph in March 2022.
