= Badminton School =

Girls' school in Bristol, England

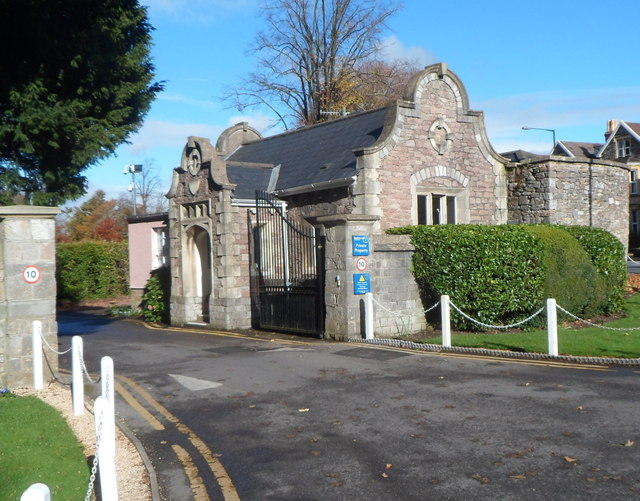
- The school lodge and gates

Location
- Westbury Road; Bristol, BS9 3BA; England
- Coordinates: 51.48557°N 2.617705°W

Information
- Type: Private boarding and day school
- Motto: Latin: Pro Omnibus Quisque, Pro Deo Omnes (Each for all, and all for God)
- Established: 1858; 168 years ago
- Founder: Miriam Badock
- Local authority: Bristol City Council
- Department for Education URN: 109337 Tables
- Head teacher: Jessica Miles
- Gender: Girls
- Age: 3 to 18
- Enrollment: 550
- Capacity: 550
- Houses: Badock; Baker; Burke; Murray; Rendall; Webb-Johnson (Webb-J)
- Alumnae: Old Badmintonians
- Website: www.badmintonschool.co.uk

Badminton School is a private boarding and day school for girls aged 3 to 18 years situated in Westbury-on-Trym, Bristol, England. Named after Badminton House in Clifton, Bristol, where it was founded, the school has been located at its current site since 1924 and consistently performs well in the government's league tables, particularly at A-Level. In 2008 the school was ranked third in the Financial Times top 1,000 schools. In the 2023 A-Levels, the school saw 48.5% of its candidates score A*/A.

According to the Good Schools Guide, "The secret of the school's success is in its size and a good deal of individual attention."

== School history ==
Badminton School, Bristol

Miriam Badock established a school for girls in 1858 at Badminton House in Clifton, Bristol. By 1898 it had become known as Miss Bartlett's School for Young Ladies.

The school developed a broad curriculum, and extracurricular activities, including sports, were encouraged which was unusual for the time. The school grew steadily in size, and in 1924 moved to the present site, under the headship of Beatrice May Baker (1876–1973). Baker, known as BMB, was fundamental in shaping Badminton's ethos and had a deep personal influence on individual pupils. She encouraged the girls to be aware of world affairs and internationalism. A pioneer in many educational fields, she established Badminton as a much-admired progressive school. She insisted on the rights of young people to freedom of expression and encouraged a questioning approach to learning: "in chapel 'Jesus often had to share the stage with Lenin'". The international outlook she pioneered continues today.

In 1958, the school celebrated its centenary with the opening of a new Science Centre by Countess Mountbatten of Burma. Dame Sybil Thorndike was president of the school at that time, and a new cantata called "The Crown of the Year" by Michael Tippett was specially commissioned to mark the event.

By the late 1960s, the progressive aspects of the school had all but vanished (Royston Lambert speech at Exeter University, 19 November 1971) and it had become a standard independent academic school.

== Old Badmintonians ==
Alumnae of the school are known as Old Badmintonians.

- Claire Bloom – actress
- Midge Bruford – (9 April 1902 – 1958)
- Mary Fedden – artist
- Indira Gandhi – Prime Minister of India
- Princess Haya Bint Al Hussein – daughter of King Hussein I of Jordan
- Jenny Joseph – poet
- Charlotte Leslie – Conservative Party MP for Bristol North West, 2010–2017
- Phyllida Law – actress
- Dame Iris Murdoch – writer
- Rosamund Pike – actress
- Unity Spencer (1930–2017), British artist
- Shirley Teed – artist
- Polly Toynbee – journalist
- Shirley Hopkins Civil – musician , French Horn, Wagner Tuba specialist. Born 1933.
