= June Mendoza =

Australian portrait painter (1924–2024)

June Mendoza AO OBE ROI
- Born: June Yvonne Mendoza; 12 June 1924; Melbourne, Victoria, Australia
- Died: 16 May 2024 (aged 99)
- Known for: Painting; portraiture
- Spouse: Keith Mackrell
- Children: 4
- Website: www.junemendoza.co.uk

June Yvonne Mendoza, AO, OBE, RP, ROI, HonSWA (12 June 1924 – 16 May 2024) was an Australian portrait painter, working mainly in oil.

== Early life ==
June Mendoza was born in Melbourne, Australia on 12 June 1924, the first child of Doris "Dot" (née Mendoza) and John Morton. Her parents were both musicians, performers and composers in violin and piano respectively. They separated when she was six, and after their divorce in 1942, Mendoza's mother reverted to her maiden name. Her younger brother Peter Mendoza (born 1927) was an actor most notably with JC Williamsons in Australia and repertory theatre in England. As a child she toured with her mother, working in small mime parts and crowd scenes for the opera, ballet, musicals and revue. During these tours she started sketching in her spare time. She realised that art was her calling at age 12 and commenced life classes at 14 and portraiture eventually became her forte. She left school early and after the Second World War moved to London, where she studied at St Martin’s School of Art. In the 1940s and 1950s, she was also active as a comic artist.

== Career ==
Mendoza's commissions have included portraits of royalty (such as Queen Elizabeth II, Queen Elizabeth The Queen Mother, Diana, Princess of Wales), prime ministers (Margaret Thatcher, John Major, Corazon Aquino, Goh Chok Tong, John Gorton) and other politicians, sports people, military officers and celebrities.

Her works are in a number of collections, including those of Britannia Royal Naval College, Girton College, Cambridge, the Green Howards Regimental Museum, the National Portrait Gallery (three works), the Open University, the Palace of Westminster, Queens' College, Cambridge, the Royal Scots Museum, and Trinity College, Oxford.

Mendoza appeared as a castaway on the BBC Radio programme Desert Island Discs on 8 September 1979, and in 1985 painted the presenter, Roy Plomley.

In 1986 she received an Honorary Doctorate from the University of Bath.

== Personal life and death ==
In 1960 she married Keith Mackrell, whom she accompanied on two overseas postings, 1960–1965 in the Philippines and 1969–1973 in Australia. They had four children.

Mendoza died after a stroke on 16 May 2024, at the age of 99.

== Honours ==
Mendoza was an Officer of the Order of Australia (AO), Officer of the Order of the British Empire (OBE), and a member of the Royal Institute of Oil Painters (ROI) and of the Royal Society of Portrait Painters (RP). She was an Honorary Vice President of the Britain-Australia Society. She was a Patron of the Tait Memorial Trust, an Australian performing arts charity based in London.

== DVD ==
- Portrait Painting in Oil With June Mendoza OBE RP ROI (DVD). Town House Films.
