= Soraya French =

Iranian artist (born 1957)

- ثریا فرانسه
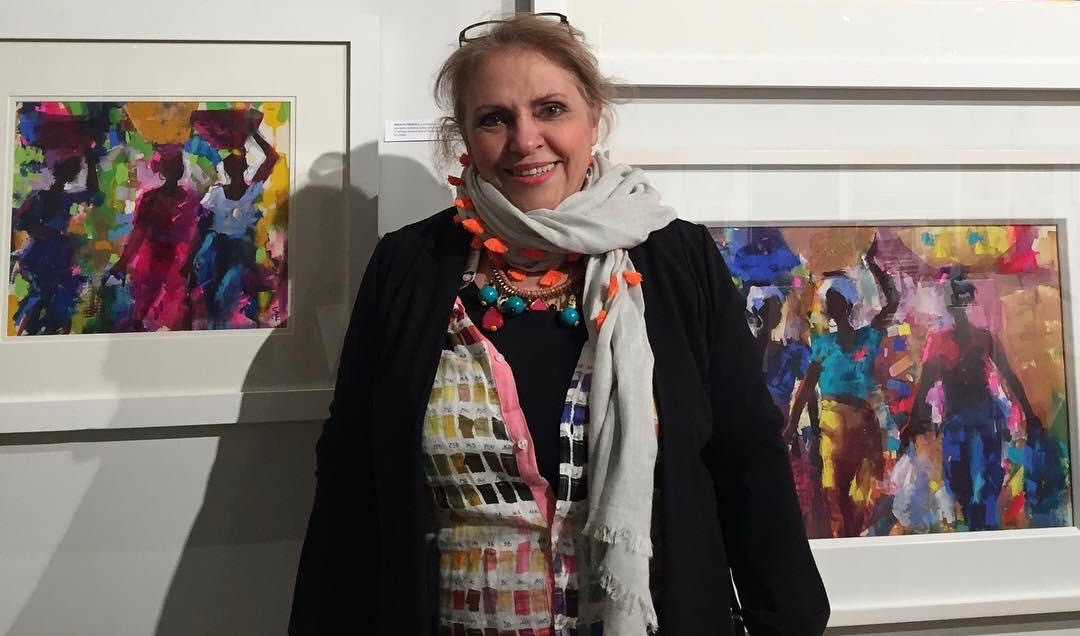
- Soraya French in 2018
- Born: 1957 (age 68–69); Tehran, Iran
- Known for: Author of educational books and acrylic painter

Soraya French (Persian: ثریا فرانسه, born 1957) is an Iranian artist known for her vivid use of colour in acrylic based multimedia and she has produced six books 30 Minute Acrylics, and Dynamic Acrylics and an instructional DVD.

== Work ==
She is a regular contributor to The Artist magazine and regularly holds painting workshops in her studio at Project Workshops. She is a demonstrator for GOLDEN artist colors.

She is the president of the Society of Women Artists (SWA) and the Andover Art Society, a member of Society of All Artists (SAA), Society for Floral Painting (SFP) and Wallop Artists. She has won various awards, the most notable are the Daler Rowney Choice Awards at Society of Women Artists.

Soraya works with different materials such as watercolours, oils, pastels, acrylics and mixed media in a variety of subject matters such as musicians, café scenes and African market scenes amongst others. Many of her subjects are travel based and people in everyday life situations feature a great deal in her work, light and colour are the two important elements in her paintings together with semi abstract passages and a sense of ambiguity where she allows the viewer to make up the story.

== Awards ==
- Runner up in Test Valley Art’s Foundation Award at The Best of Hampshire 2009
- Test Valley Art’s Foundation Award for The Best Painting by a Hampshire Artist (Best of Hampshire Exhibition) at Sir Harold Hillier’s in November 2008
- Best Miniature Society of Floral Painters Mottisfont 2006
- Artist of the Year 2005 Artist & Illustrators exhibition
- Daler-Rowney Choice Award, Society of Women Artists, June 2004
- Winchester Art Club 76th annual exhibition, November 2003
- Salisbury Open Award April 2003
- Fight for Sight regional competition, November 2002
- Edwin Young Award, April 2002
- Edwin Young Award Salisbury Open 1997 -The painting was purchased for the Edwin Young Museum collection
