= Frederick Marrable =

British architect (1819–1872)

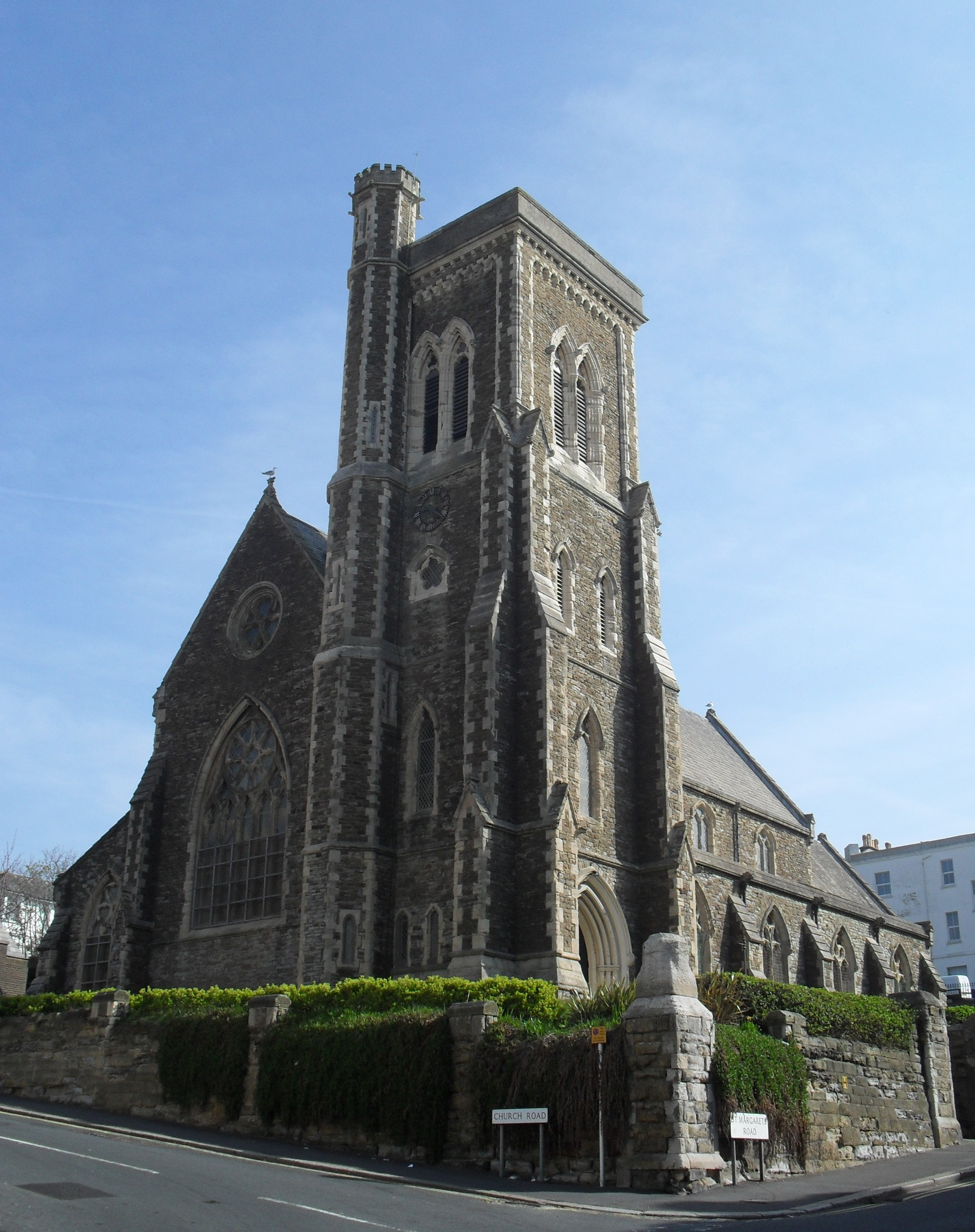
St Mary Magdalene's Church, St Leonards-on-Sea, designed by Marrable in 1852

Frederick Marrable (January 1819 – 22 June 1872) was a British architect who was notable as the first Chief Architect for the Metropolitan Board of Works, responsible for designing its headquarters.

== Early career ==
Marrable was the son of Sir Thomas Smith Marrable, who was Secretary of the Board of Green Cloth (responsible for organising Royal visits) for King George IV and King William IV. He began his architectural career articled to Edward Blore in 1835, and subsequently studied abroad, which influenced his architectural style. He started his own company when he returned to Britain. In this period he designed St Mary Magdalene's Church in St Leonards-on-Sea (1852).

== Metropolitan Board ==
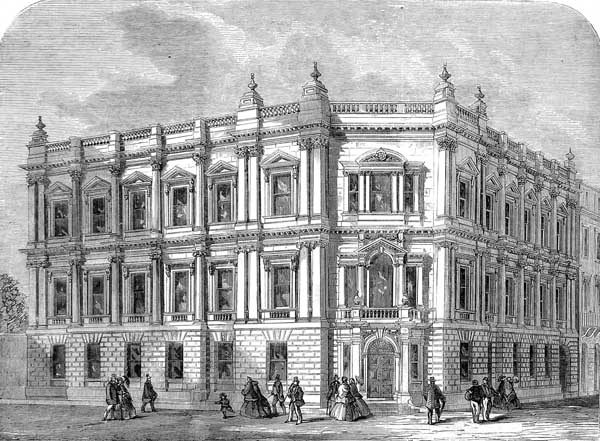
Offices for the Metropolitan Board of Works, 1860 by Frederick Marrable. A line drawing from the Illustrated London News, demonstrating the interest in the new building

He was selected without any great controversy as the first Chief Architect of the Metropolitan Board of Works on 1 February 1856. Marrable was not a particularly well-regarded architect but no greater figure applied for the job, partially because the salary being offered was relatively low, but also because the architect would largely be responsible for building roads and not distinctive buildings. Marrable approached this task with a methodical eye, but often ended up being perceived as boring, as The Elector for 27 June 1857 said that he was "squeezing every word to death almost in a half-closed mouth, so that nobody scarcely knows what he says".

Under his supervision, Garrick Street and Southwark Street were designed. When the Metropolitan Board obtained a site at Spring Gardens to build its headquarters, Marrable was naturally engaged to design it. He produced a three-storey building in the Italianate style, which (after subsequent enlargements) was impressive for Nikolaus Pevsner to regard as the chief interest in the street.

== Resignation ==
By the end of 1860, Marrable was beginning to feel that he was being grossly underpaid and overworked. He referred to having written more than five thousand reports for the Board, and demanded an increase in his £800 annual salary. The Board, conscious of the opposition of the Vestries to any increase in its demands for money, reluctantly offered a raise to £1,200 (to then go up in stages to £1,500). There was indeed an outcry, with John Nicholay (member for Marylebone, a vestry committed to strict economy) describing the proposal as an act of suicide. The proposed new salary was then scaled back to £1,000. Marrable thought this a contemptible offer and resigned in February 1861.

== Subsequent career ==
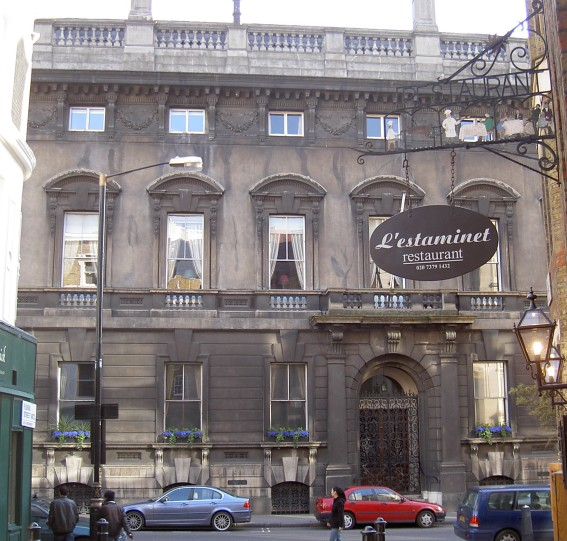
The Garrick Club, in its smoke-blackened state before the cleaning.

After his resignation, Marrable designed his most notable surviving building, the Garrick Club (1864) which was again in an Italianate palazzo style. The Garrick is fronted in Portland render which blackened over the years; proposals to clean it did not receive the support of club members until 2005. Marrable married Madeline Cockburn, a painter, in the same year. He continued to work occasionally on Metropolitan Board of Works compensation matters; an inquiry many years after his death found evidence that he may have been corrupt. Another building designed by Marrable was St Peter's Church in Brockley (1866–70).

== Death ==
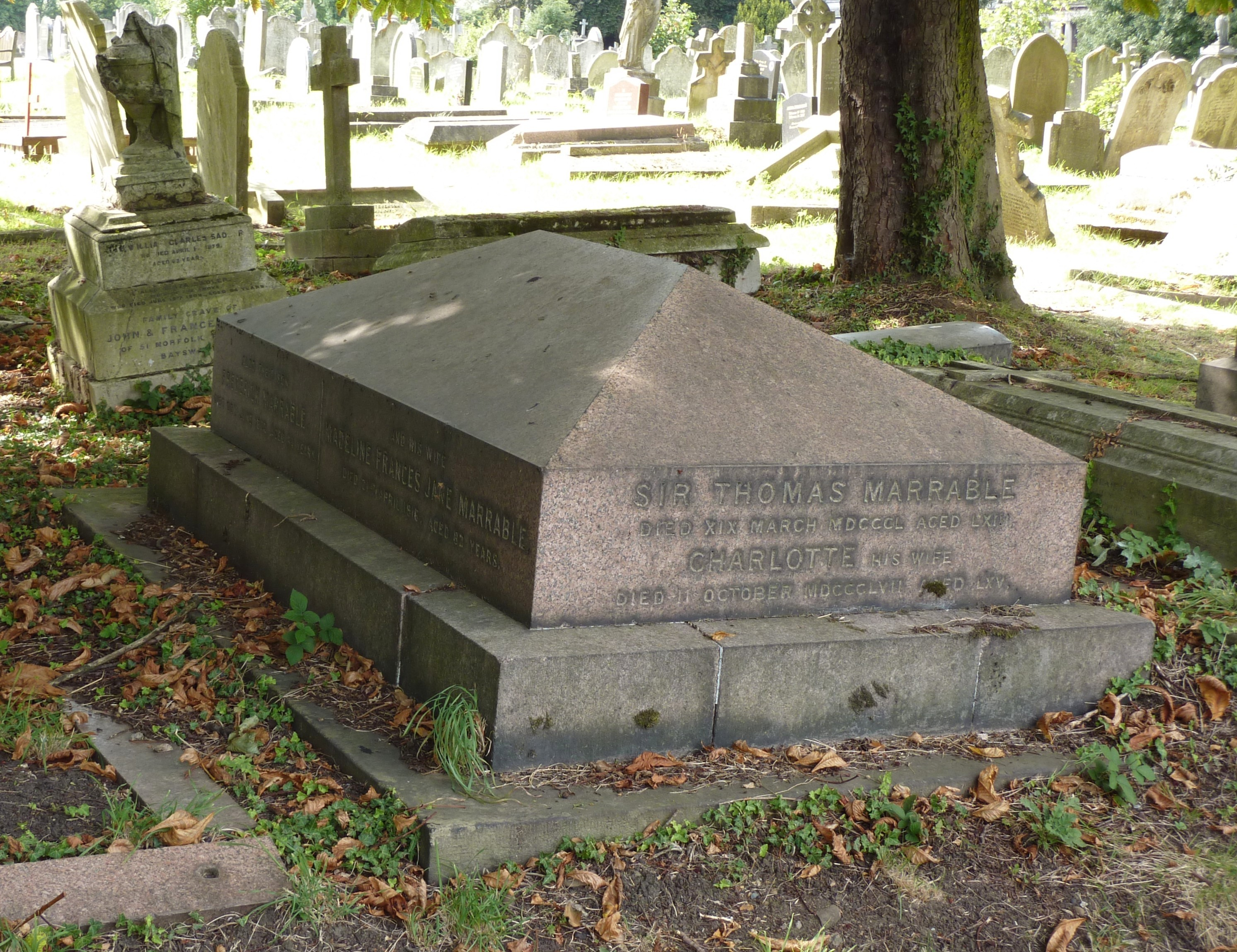
The Marrable's family grave at Kensal Green Cemetery, London

Marrable died suddenly on a visit to inspect the Bethlehem Hospital for Convalescents in Witley, and is buried at the Kensal Green Cemetery in London. His posthumous reputation tends to concentrate on his work for the Metropolitan Board, rather than his contribution to architecture.

== List of Works ==
=== England ===
- St Mary Magdalene's Church, St Leonards-on-Sea, East Sussex
- Garrick Club, Covent Garden, Greater London (1864)
- Church of St. Peter and St. Paul, Brockdish, Norfolk (1864–65)
