= Cardiff High School =

Secondary school in Cardiff, Wales

Location
- Llandennis Road; Cyncoed, Cardiff; Wales; 51.51754°N 3.1748°W

Information
- Type: Public (magnet) secondary
- Motto: Tua'r Goleuni (Welsh: "Towards the Light")
- Established: 1895 (Creation of earliest of predecessor schools)
- Acting Headteacher: Mr Thompson
- Gender: Both
- Age: Year 7 to Year 13 (up to 18 years of age)
- Enrolment: 1650 (approx.)
- Website: www.cardiffhigh.cardiff.sch.uk

Cardiff High School (Welsh: Ysgol Uwchradd Caerdydd) is a comprehensive school in the Cyncoed area of Cardiff, Wales. Mr Thompson has been in the position of Acting Headteacher since 2025.

== History ==
Although the school was established in its current form in 1970, its origins go back much further to the foundations of the three schools that merged to form the present school.

=== City of Cardiff High Schools ===
The former City of Cardiff High Schools

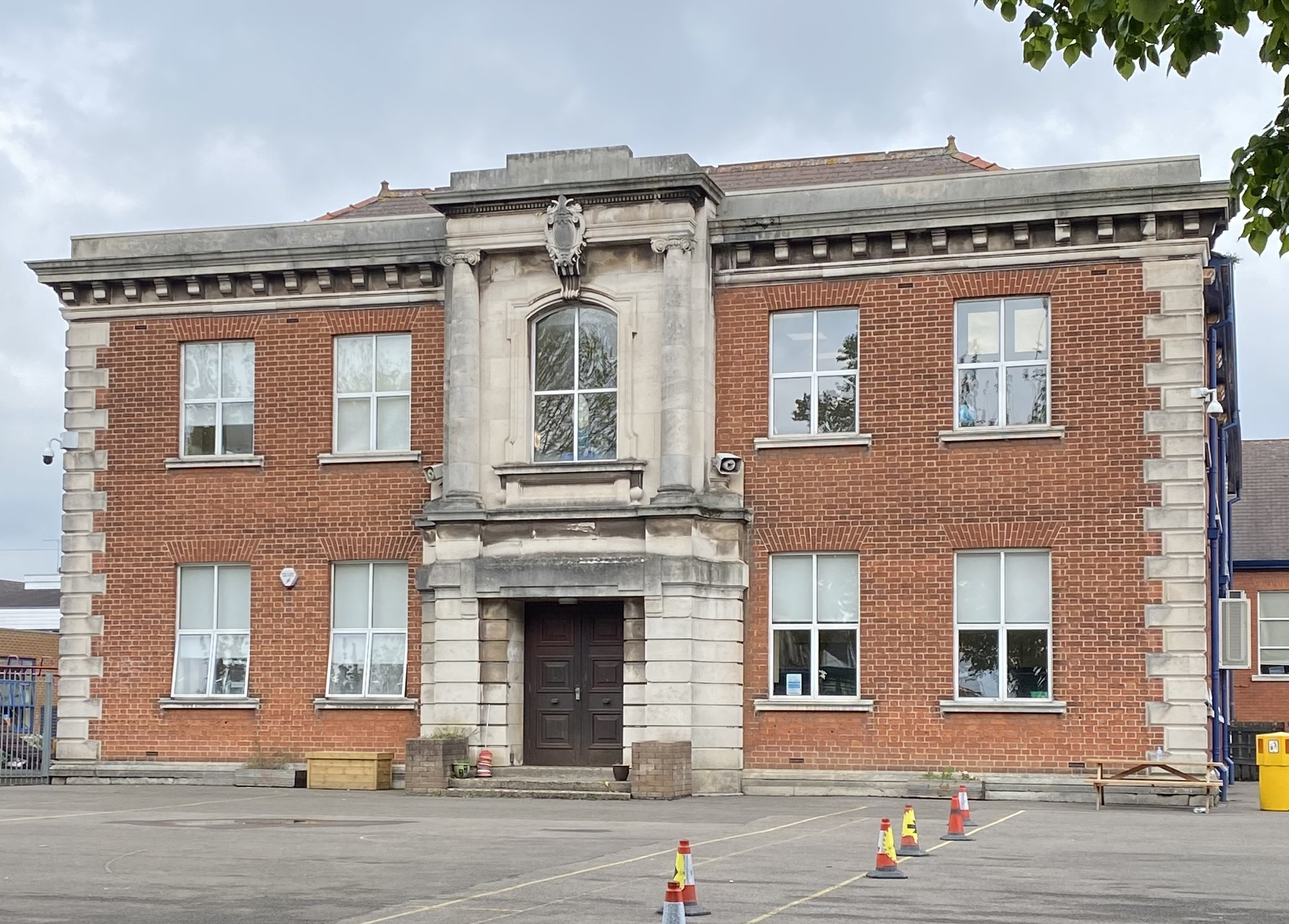
The former boys' school in Newport Road

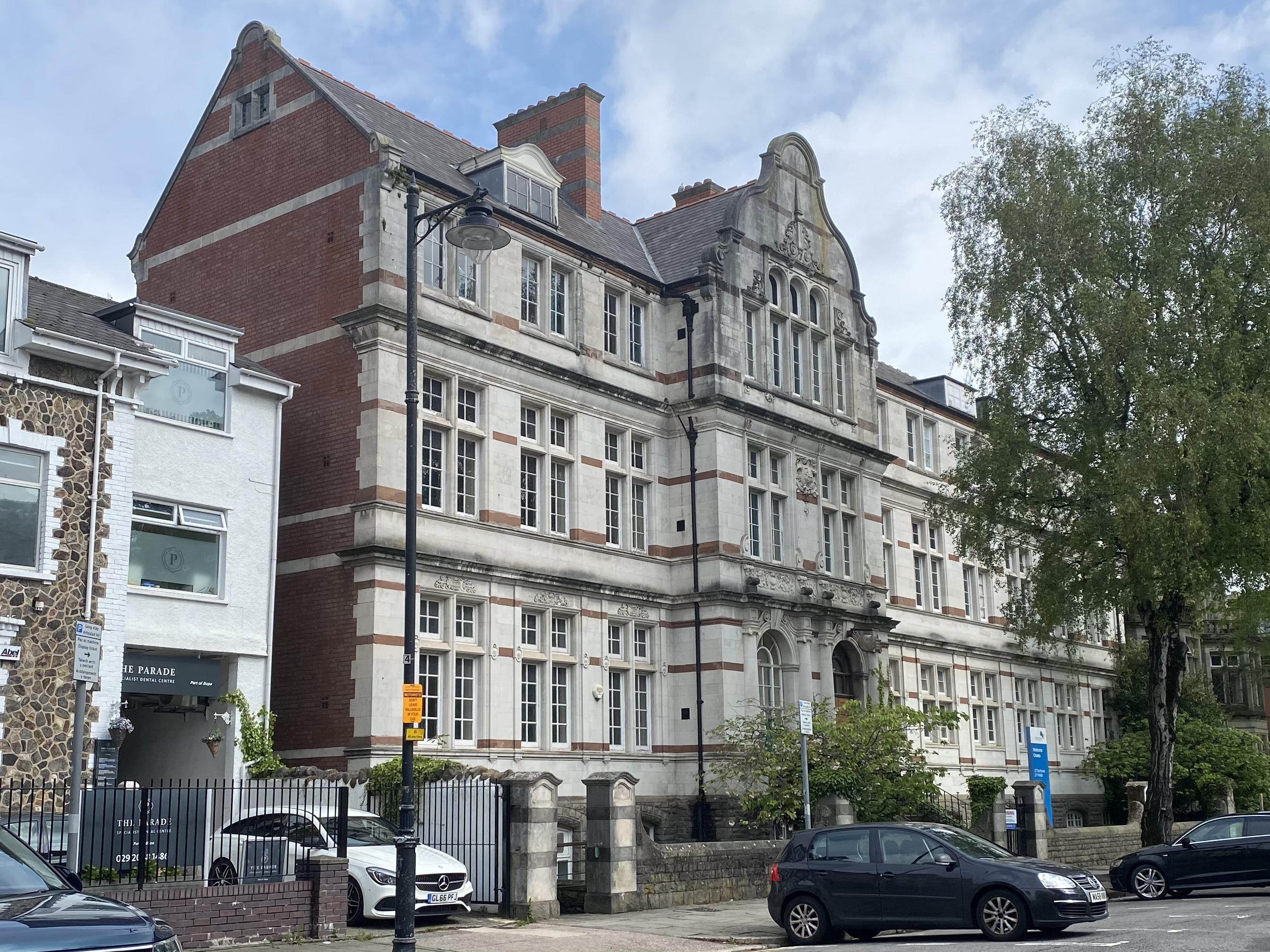
The former girls' school in The Parade

City of Cardiff High School for Girls was opened in January 1895 in the Parade, Cardiff, with Mary Collin as its first headmistress, and City of Cardiff High School for Boys was opened in September 1898 in Newport Road, Cardiff. Both were created under the terms of the Welsh Intermediate Education Act 1889 and therefore were originally called Cardiff Intermediate School for Girls and Cardiff Intermediate School for Boys respectively.

From 1905, secondary school education in Cardiff was largely provided through a system of Municipal Secondary Schools that were organised under the Education Act 1902. Although the Intermediate Schools were both rebranded as high schools in 1911 (thus the schools became Cardiff High School for Girls and Cardiff High School for Boys) they suffered in comparison with the municipal secondary schools because of their entrance examinations and later their fees, particularly after the municipal secondary schools abolished fees in 1924.

The working-class intake of the schools was limited because parents were deterred by the fees, only partly made up by scholarships and bursaries, and later by the regime and curriculum of the grammar school. When the United Kingdom Government passed the Education Act 1944, the Tripartite System was established, dividing secondary schools into three categories, the grammar school, the secondary technical school and the secondary modern school. The grammar school was deemed the place of education for the academically gifted (as determined by the 11-plus), and the high schools were selected to become the grammar schools (hence, the informal term Cardiff Grammar School applied to both).

The boys' school had from an early stage suffered with a constricted site on Newport Road. Within three years of its foundation, a new site was acquired in 1901 on the corner of Corbett Road and Park Place, but the school eventually stayed on its original site, with a new school opened in 1910 and further extensions in 1931–32.

=== Cardiff High School formed by merger ===
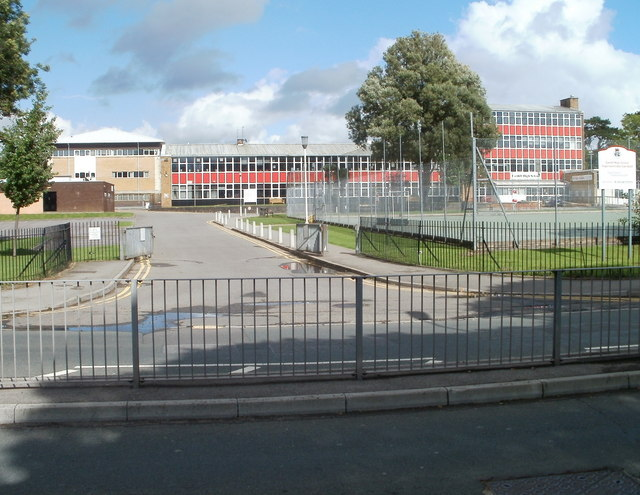
Cardiff High School in Llandennis Road

The school was unified on a single site in 1973. The Newport Road site of the former High School was eventually sold to fund an extension to Willows High School in Tremorfa, Cardiff.

The accommodation in 1973 consisted of the old Ty Celyn School Llandennis Road, Cardiff, with a new building attached, designed for six form entry. A considerable amount of internal alteration has been carried out on the original building. An extension was completed in December 2013 which added a multi-purpose space, Neuadd Celyn, for theatrical performances, and additional classrooms.

In 2014, the Sixth Form Centre relocated to Ty Celyn and was renovated to provide a designated centre for sixth form students.

Cardiff High School became a seven-form entry school in September 1998, when a third feeder primary school, Roath Park, was added to the two existing feeder schools, Lakeside and Rhydypenau. In 2011, Marlborough Primary was added as a fourth partner school (the 'Feeder School' criterion no longer being considered for admission purposes) as the school increased to an eight form intake. As of 2016, it has a total pupil roll of 1635, of whom 450 are in the sixth form.

== School performance and inspections ==
The school has been rated as Excellent for current performance and Excellent for prospects for improvement by Estyn (2013). According to the latest inspection report by Estyn, the school is rated as Excellent and, 'the standards achieved by pupils are consistently very high and well above expectations.'

Cardiff High School is a Green Category school and in Standards Group 1.

The school achieved its highest results in 2016 with 84% of students achieving Level 2+ (5 GCSEs including English and Mathematics).

== Filming location ==
Cardiff High School has been the site of filming for episodes of The Sarah Jane Adventures, a Doctor Who spin-off show during 2008 and 2010. Episodes filmed at the school include "Revenge of the Slitheen", "The Lost Boy" and "The Nightmare Man".

== Notable former pupils ==
- Mark Andrews – WWE wrestler
- Sir Ronald Bell – twentieth-century Conservative Party member of Parliament (MP)
- Sir Leszek Borysiewicz – chief executive of the Medical Research Council, vice-chancellor of the University of Cambridge
- Harry Bowcott – president, Welsh Rugby Union
- Jeremy Bowen – broadcaster
- James Down – professional rugby player
- Gillian Gill – author
- Robert Griffiths – general secretary of the Communist Party of Britain
- Richard Hermer – barrister, attorney general for England and Wales from July 2024 to July 2026
- Tom Horabin – politician
- Meredydd Hughes – former chief constable, South Yorkshire
- Bob Humphrys – journalist
- John Humphrys – broadcaster
- Brian Josephson – physicist and Nobel laureate
- Sarah Lark – West End performer, BBC's I'd Do Anything finalist
- Anthony Llewellyn – astronaut
- Brian Morris (Lord Morris of Castle Morris) – academic, poet and member of the House of Lords
- Joan Oxland – artist, teacher
- Christopher Pelling – Regius Professor of Greek, Oxford University
- Joanna Penberthy – first female bishop in the Church in Wales
- Goronwy Rees – Welsh journalist, academic and writer
- Paul Westmacott Richards CBE – professor of Botany at University College of North Wales (now Bangor University)
- Jon Ronson – journalist, author, documentary filmmaker and radio presenter
- Bernice Rubens – novelist
- John Seys-Llewellyn – barrister prosecuting during the Nuremberg Trials
- Michael Shepherd CBE – psychiatrist, former professor of epidemiological psychiatry
- Craig Thomas – writer
