= Fred Fooks =

Australian rules footballer

Personal information
- Full name: Frederick George Fooks
- Born: 26 November 1880; Wallaroo, South Australia
- Died: 30 June 1958 (aged 77); South Melbourne, Victoria
- Original team: Port Rovers
- Height: 175 cm (5 ft 9 in)
- Weight: 72 kg (159 lb)

Playing career^{1}
Years	Club	Games (Goals)
1903	Essendon	3 (2)
- ^{1} Playing statistics correct to the end of 1903.

Frederick George Fooks (26 November 1880 – 30 June 1958) was an Australian rules footballer who played with Essendon in the Victorian Football League (VFL).
