= Daphne Todd =

English artist (born 1947)

Daphne Todd OBE (born 27 March 1947) is an English artist who was the first female President of the Royal Society of Portrait Painters from 1994–2000, and who won the BP Portrait Award 2010 with a painting of her 100-year-old mother's corpse.

She attended the Simon Langton Grammar School for Girls in Canterbury, Kent.

She studied at the Slade School of Fine Art in London from 1964–71. In 1983, she won 2nd prize in what is now the BP Portrait Award, and in 1984 a "special commendation". She was elected a member of the Royal Society of Portrait Painters in 1985. She became a Freeman of the City of London in 1997 and received an Hon. Doctorate of Arts from De Montfort University in 1998.

In 1985, she won the Hunting Art Prize for oil painting with her picture "Four Spanish Chairs". In 2001, she won the Ondaatje Prize for Portraiture and the Gold Medal, and was appointed an OBE.

In 2023, Todd faced controversy after claiming a local resident, who was part of a community support group she likened to the Mafia, was a token women.
