= Ursula Fookes =

English painter and printmaker

Ursula Mary Fookes (27 June 1906 in St. John's Wood, London – 1991 in Blakeney, Norfolk) was an English painter and printmaker, who worked in colour linocut and painted in oils and watercolours.

Fookes studied at the Grosvenor School of Modern Art from 1929 to 1931, under Claude Flight. She exhibited in the annual British Linocut exhibitions at the Redfern and Ward Galleries in the 1930s, and also showed her work with the Society of Women Artists and the New English Art Club. Also during the 1930s Fookes painted and travelled abroad, often with the artist Pauline Logan, who shared a studio with her in Pimlico. In 1939, Fookes moved to Hampshire where she did war work before travelling to Europe in 1945 to spend a year running a mobile canteen for troops. The Imperial War Museum in London holds the diary she kept during that time. She retired to Wiveton in North Norfolk. In Norfolk she developed a keen interest in bird-watching and her output as an artist greatly diminished but interest in her work revived after her death. Examples of her work are held by the Art Institute of Chicago.

== Exhibitions ==
- 2010 "Emerging Images: The Creative Process in Prints", International Print Center New York
