= Charles Wheeler (sculptor) =

British sculptor (1892–1974)

Sir Charles Wheeler
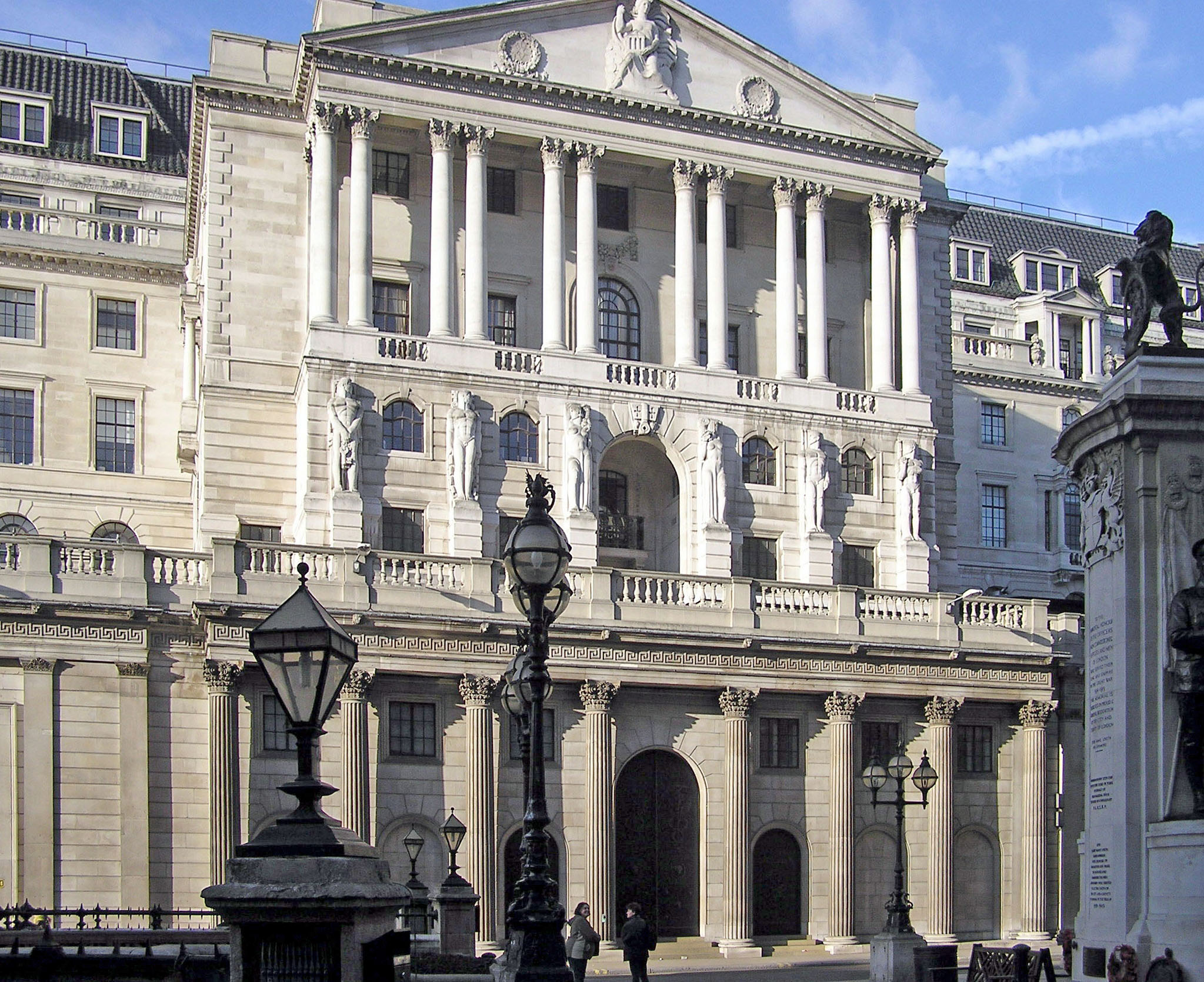
- Bank of England facade, sculpture by Sir Charles Wheeler
- Born: Charles Thomas Wheeler; 14 March 1892; Codsall, Staffordshire, England
- Died: 22 August 1974 (aged 82); Five Ashes, Mayfield, Sussex, England
- Education: Wolverhampton College of Art; Royal College of Art
- Known for: sculpture, architectural sculpture
- Awards: Knight Commander of the Royal Victorian Order; Commander of the Order of the British Empire

For the Australian painter see: Charles Wheeler (painter)

Sir Charles Thomas Wheeler KCVO CBE PRA (14 March 1892 – 22 August 1974) was a British sculptor who worked in bronze and stone who became the first sculptor to hold the presidency of the Royal Academy, from 1956 until 1966.

== Biography ==
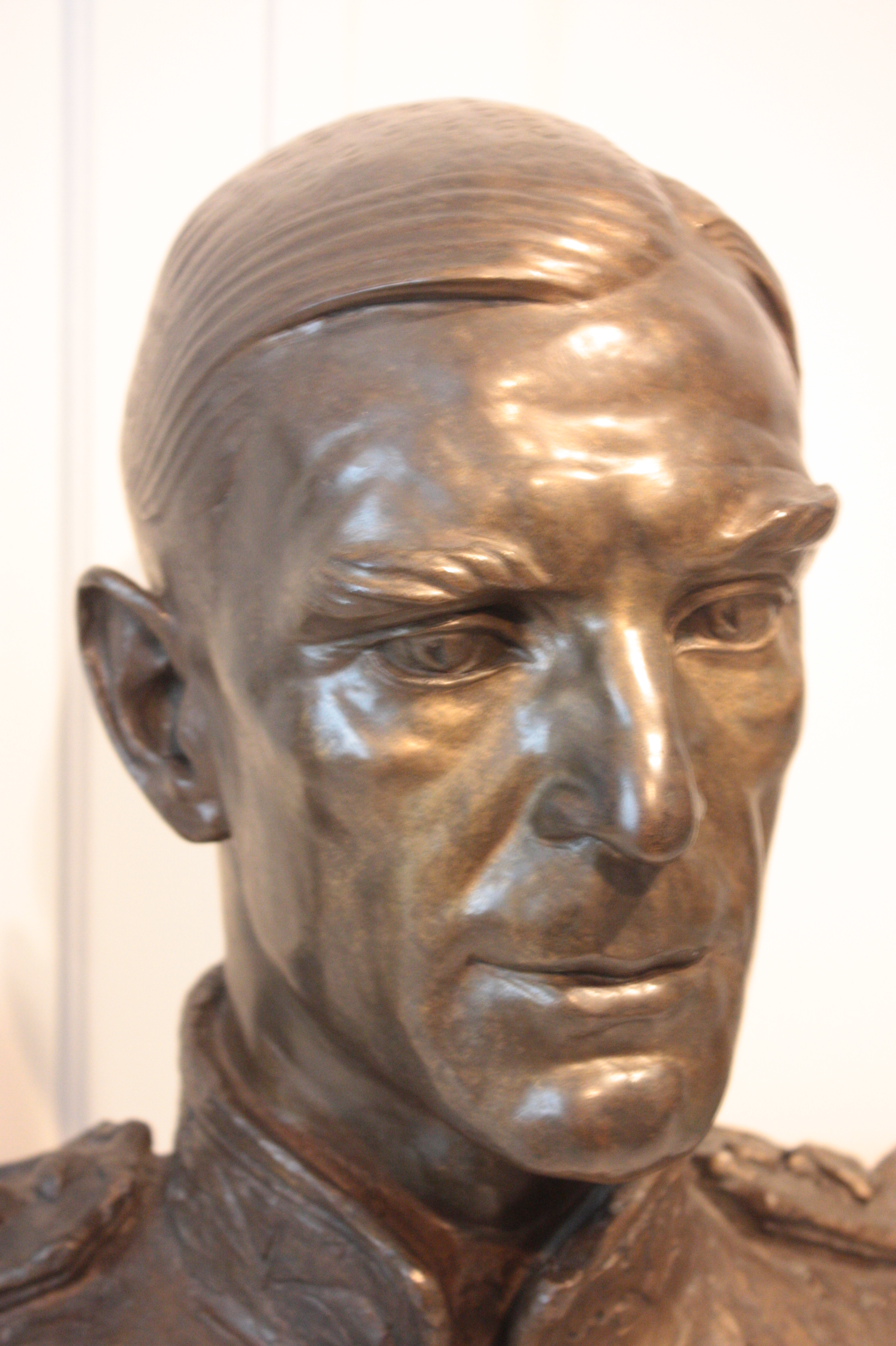
Admiral Philip Louis Vian by Charles Wheeler, 1942

Wheeler was the son of a journalist and was born in Codsall, Staffordshire, and raised in nearby Wolverhampton. He studied at the Wolverhampton College of Art, now Wolverhampton University, under Robert Emerson, between 1908 and 1912. In 1912 he won a scholarship to the Royal College of Art where he studied under Édouard Lantéri until 1917. Throughout the remainder of World War I, Wheeler was classified as unfit for active service and instead modelled artificial limbs for war amputees.

Wheeler came to specialize in portraits and architectural sculpture. From 1914 until 1970 he exhibited regularly at the Royal Academy and became a Fellow of the academy in 1940 and became its president in 1956. His tenure as RA president was controversial for the decision by the academy to sell the most valuable painting in its collection, the Leonardo da Vinci cartoon of The Virgin and Child with St Anne and St John the Baptist. The possibility that the painting might leave Britain caused a public outcry and eventually it was sold to the National Gallery. From 1942 to 1949, he served as a trustee of the Tate Gallery and in 1946 was a member of the Royal Fine Art Commission. In 1968 he wrote his autobiography, High Relief.

During the Second World War Wheeler was the only sculptor to be given full-time contracts by the War Artists' Advisory Committee. In both 1941 and 1942, Wheeler was commissioned to produce portrait busts of Admiralty figures. Due to material shortages and other issues, Wheeler produced only three bronze figures during the commission period.

== Personal life ==
In 1918, Wheeler met Muriel Bourne, youngest daughter of A. W. Bourne, and a sculptor and painter herself at the time. They married and had two children, their son Robin and their daughter Carol.

In 1968, Wheeler moved to a Sussex farmhouse to evade the noise of constructions near their previous dwelling. He died on 22 August 1974, at the age of 82 and was buried in Codsall.

== Works ==
Notable works include by Wheeler include,

- The 20-foot bronze doors and a major programme of sculptures, including the "Lothbury Ladies" and the gilded finial figure of Ariel for the Bank of England, with architect Sir Herbert Baker, 1922–45
- Fountain and memorial plates for Blackmoor War Memorial Cloister by Sir Herbert Baker.
- Sculptures for Rhodes House, Oxford, with Baker, 1927
- Sculptures for India House, Aldwych, with Baker, 1928–30
- Sculptures for South Africa House with Baker, 1934
- The western fountain figures in Trafalgar Square, 1948
- The allegorical figures of the Seven Seas at the Tower Hill Memorial
- The statue of Lady Wulfrun outside St. Peter's Collegiate Church, Wolverhampton
- Assorted architectural sculptures and keystones for the Bank of England extension at One New Change
- The monumental Earth and Water figures for the Ministry of Defence in Whitehall
- The gilded bronze eagle on top of the Malta Memorial in Floriana, 1954

Cultural offices
Preceded by Sir Albert Richardson	President of the Royal Academy; 1956–1966	Succeeded by Walter Thomas Monnington
