= Adelaide (disambiguation) =

Adelaide is the capital city of South Australia.

Adelaide may also refer to:

== Places ==
=== Australia ===
- Adelaide Airport, in South Australia
- Adelaide Airport, South Australia, a suburb
- Adelaide railway station, in South Australia
- Adelaide River, Northern Territory
- Adelaide Street, Brisbane, Queensland
- City of Adelaide, South Australia, a local government area
- Division of Adelaide, South Australia, an electorate in the federal parliament of Australia
- Electoral district of Adelaide, South Australia, an electorate in the state parliament
- Port Adelaide, in South Australia

=== Canada ===
- Adelaide, Ontario, a community in the township of Adelaide Metcalfe
- Adelaide Peninsula, Nunavut

=== United States ===
- Adelaide, Fremont County, Colorado, a former mining camp
- Adelaide, Lake County, Colorado
- Adelaide, Georgia
- Adelaide Peak (Washington), a summit in Olympic National Park
- Adelaide Township, Bowman County, North Dakota

=== Elsewhere ===
- Adelaide, Eastern Cape, South Africa, a town and area
- Adelaide Island, an island located off the west coast of the Antarctic Peninsula
- Adelaide railway station (Northern Ireland)
- Adelaide Road, a street in London, England
- Adelaide Beach, a town in the Bahamas

== Arts, entertainment, and media ==
=== Fictional characters ===
- Adelaide, a character in Philip Pullman's Sally Lockhart series of books
- Adelaide of the Pasture, a character from the animated miniseries Over the Garden Wall
- Adelaide Chang, a character in The Loud House and its spin-off The Casagrandes

=== Music ===
==== Classical music and operas ====
- "Adelaide" (Beethoven), a song for voice and piano by Ludwig van Beethoven, after Matthisson's poem
- Adelaide (Sartorio), an opera by the 16th century composer Antonio Sartorio
- "Adelaide" (Schubert), a song for voice and piano by Franz Schubert, after Matthisson's poem
- Adelaide, an opera by Giovanni Maria Orlandini 1729
- Adelaide, an opera by the 18th century composer Nicola Porpora
- Adélaïde Concerto, falsely attributed to Wolfgang Amadeus Mozart, actually by Marius Casadesus
- Adélaïde ou le langage des fleurs, a 1912 ballet version of Valses Nobles et Sentimentales (Ravel)

==== Songs ====
- "Adelaide", a song by Anberlin from the album Cities
- "Adelaide", a song by John Cale from the album Vintage Violence
- "Adelaide", a song by Thomas Dybdahl from the album ...That Great October Sound
- "Adelaide", a song by Ben Folds
- "Adelaide", a song by Paul Kelly and the Coloured Girls from the album Gossip
- "Adelaide", a song from the film of Guys and Dolls, written and composed by Frank Loesser
- "Adelaide", a song by Meg Myers
- "Adelaide", a song by the Old 97's from the album Drag It Up
- "Adelaide", a hymntune composed by George C. Stebbins for the lyrics of "Have Thine Own Way" by Adelaide A. Pollard

=== Other uses in arts, entertainment, and media ===
- Adelaide (1800 play), an 1800 play by Henry James Pye
- Adelaide (1814 play), an 1814 play by Richard Lalor Sheil
- Adélaïde (film), a 1968 French film
- "Adelaide" (Magnum, P.I.), a 1981 television episode
- "Adelaide", a poem by Friedrich von Matthisson

== Ships ==
- Adelaide (1832), a wooden cutter was wrecked in New South Wales in May 1834
- PS Adelaide, (1866), second oldest wooden hulled paddle steamer still operating anywhere in the world
- Adelaide (1879), a wooden schooner lost after leaving Newcastle, New South Wales
- Adelaide (shipwrecked 1837), a wooden cutter that was in New South Wales in July 1837
- Adelaide (shipwrecked 1850), a British ship from Bristol
- Adelaide, a New Zealand Company sailing ship that bought immigrants to New Zealand from England in 1839–40
- Adelaide class frigate, a class of Australian naval vessel
- HMAS Adelaide, several Australian naval vessels
- HMS Adelaide, name of three ships of the British Royal Navy

== Other uses ==
- Adelaide (given name), including a list of people
- Adelaide (horse), an Irish-bred racehorse
- Adelaide Football Club, an Australian rules football club
- Adelaide Mansions, a listed building in Hove, East Sussex, England
- Adelaide Steamship Company, a defunct Australian company
- 525 Adelaide, an asteroid
- Adelaide Productions, an animation division of Sony Pictures Television

== See also ==
- Adelaide River (disambiguation)
- Adelheid
- City of Adelaide (disambiguation)
- North Adelaide (disambiguation)
- Port Adelaide (disambiguation)
- Queen Adelaide (disambiguation)
- Royal Adelaide (disambiguation)
- Adelaide Street (disambiguation)
