= List of disasters in Spain by death toll =

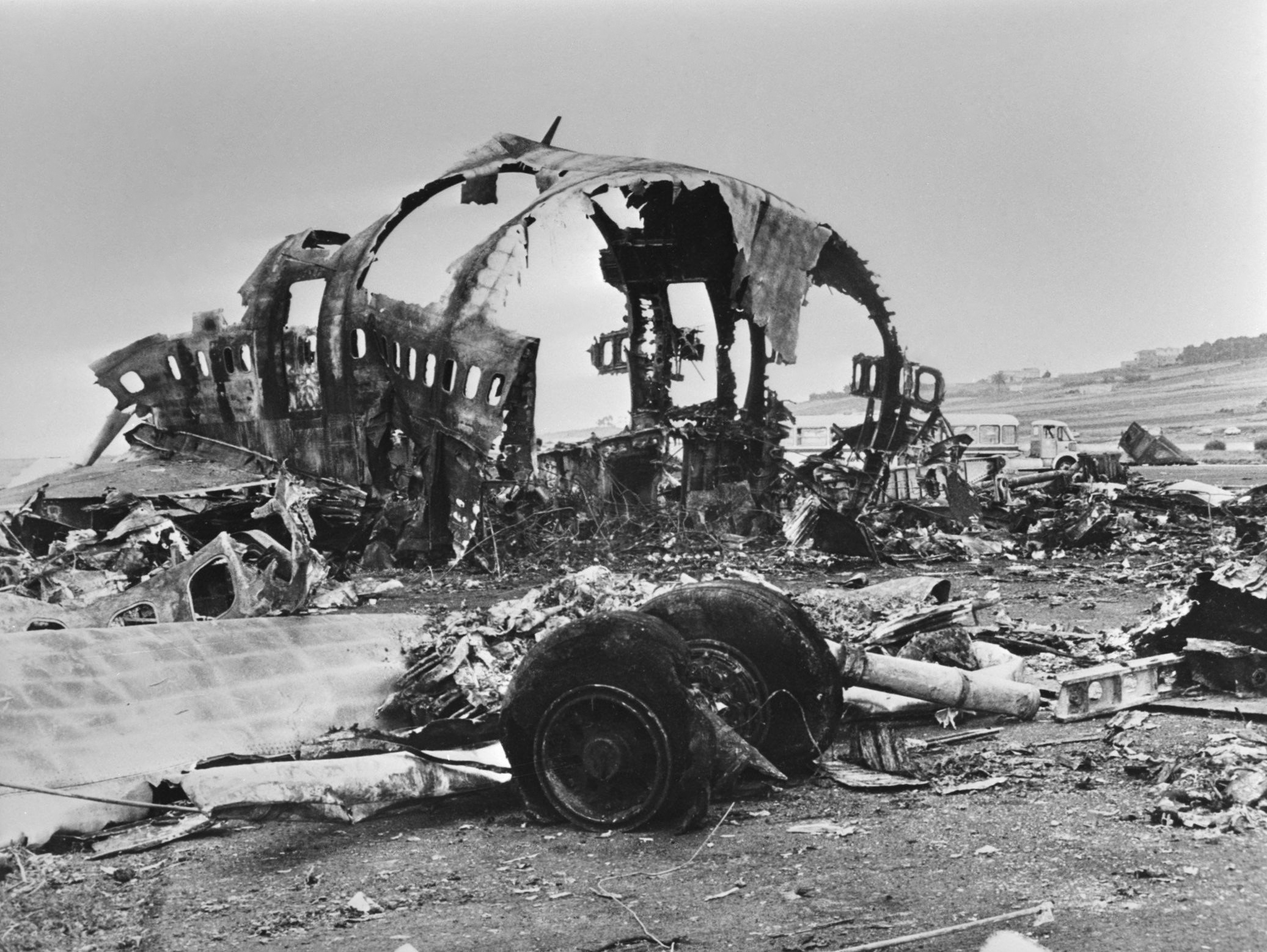
Aftermath of the Tenerife airport disaster, which killed 583 people in 1977.

This list of Spanish disasters by death toll includes major disasters (excluding acts of war) that occurred on Spanish soil or involved Spanish citizens, in a definable incident, where the loss of life was 10 or more.

== 200 or more deaths ==
Fatalities	Year	Article	Type	Location	Comments
2,000,000-6,000,000	1348-1350	Black Death in Spain	Pandemic	Spain	
500,000	1647-1652	Great Plague of Seville	Epidemic	Seville, Andalusia	
121,852	2020-Present	COVID-19 pandemic in Spain	Pandemic	Spain	
3,000-8,000	1870	1870 Barcelona yellow fever epidemic	Epidemic	Barcelona, Catalonia	
2,500	1522	1522 Almería earthquake	Earthquake	Almería, Andalusia	
1,200	1884	1884 Andalusian earthquake	Earthquake	Andalusia	
1,000+	1879	Santa Teresa flood	Flood	Murcia (Region of Murcia)	
~1,000	1431	1431 Granada earthquake	Earthquake	Granada, Andalusia	
~800	1428	1428 Catalonia earthquake	Earthquake	Catalonia	
617-1,000	1962	1962 Vallés floods	Flood	Catalonia	
590	1893	SS Cabo Machichaco	Ship explosion	Santander, Cantabria	
583	1977	Tenerife airport disaster	Runway collision	Tenerife, Canary Islands	
472	1870	HMS Captain (1869)	Ship sinking	offshore of Galicia (Galicia (Spain))	
412	1895	Spanish cruiser Reina Regente (1887)	Ship sinking	Gulf of Cádiz	
400	1804	1804 Almería earthquake	Earthquake	Almería, Andalusia	
389	1829	1829 Torrevieja earthquake	Earthquake	Alicante, Valencian Community	
298+	1826	1826 Canary Islands storm	Cyclone	Canary Islands	
238	2024	2024 Spanish floods	Floods	Spain	
215	1978	Los Alfaques disaster	Gas explosion	Tarragona, Catalonia	

== 199 to 100 deaths ==
Fatalities	Year	Article	Type	Location	Comments
181	1983	Avianca Flight 011	Plane crash	Madrid (Community of Madrid)	
165	1518	1518 Vera earthquake	Earthquake	Almería, Andalusia	
155	1972	1972 Tenerife Spantax Convair CV-990 crash	Plane crash	Tenerife, Canary Islands	
154	2008	Spanair Flight 5022	Plane crash	Madrid (Community of Madrid)	
148	1985	Iberia Flight 610	Plane crash	Oiz, Biscay	
146	1980	Dan-Air Flight 1008	Plane crash	Tenerife, Canary Islands	
144	1959	Vega de Tera disaster	Dam failure	Zamora, Castile and León	
112	1970	Dan-Air Flight 1903	Plane crash	Arbúcies, Catalonia	
104	1972	Iberia Flight 602	Plane crash	Ibiza, Balearic Islands	

== 99 to 10 deaths ==
Fatalities	Year	Incident Name	Type	Location	Comments
93	1983	1983 Madrid Airport runway collision	Runway collision	Madrid (Community of Madrid)	
87	1996	1996 Biescas flood	Flood	Biescas, Aragon	
85	1973	Aviaco Flight 118	Plane crash	A Coruña, Galicia (Galicia (Spain))	
82	1983	Alcalá 20 nightclub fire	Building fire	Madrid (Community of Madrid)	
81+	1957	1957 Valencia flood	Flood	Valencia (Valencian Community)	
80+	1979	Hotel Corona de Aragón fire	Building fire	Zaragoza, Aragon	
80	1964	1964 Mt. Alcazaba UTA Douglas DC-6 crash	Plane crash	Granada, Andalusia	
79	1888	SS Sud America I	Ship sinking	Las Palmas, Canary Islands	
79	2013	Santiago de Compostela derailment	Train derailment	Santiago de Compostela, Galicia (Galicia (Spain))	
79	1972	El Cuervo Cádiz-Sevilla railbus crash	Train collision	Lebrija, Andalusia	
78-100	1944	Torre del Bierzo rail disaster	Train collision	Torre del Bierzo, Castile and León	
77	1778	Main Theater of Zaragoza fire	Building fire	Zaragoza, Aragon	
68	2026	2026 Toledo train collision	Train collision	Los Yébenes, Castilla–La Mancha	
59	1884	Alcudia bridge disaster	Train accident	Alamillo, Castilla–La Mancha	
52	1970	Soviet submarine K-8	Submarine fire	Bay of Biscay	
50	1982	Spantax Flight 995	Plane crash	Málaga, Andalusia	
48	1940	Velilla de Ebro train crash	Train collision	Velilla de Ebro, Aragon	
46	2026	2026 Adamuz train derailments	Train collision	Adamuz, Andalusia	
44	1903	Montalvo bridge train derailment	Train accident	Torremontalbo, La Rioja	
43	1990	Flying nightclub fire	Building fire	Zaragoza, Aragon	
43	2006	Valencia Metro derailment	Train derailment	Valencia, Valencian Community	
41	1887	SMS Gneisenau (1879)	Ship sinking	Málaga, Andalusia	
39	1983	1983 Spanish floods	Floods	Biscay	
38	1748	Estubeny earthquake	Earthquake	Estubeny, Valencian Community	
35-39	2023	2023 Canary Islands migrant boat disaster	Migrant disaster	Offshore of Canary Islands	
34-52	1965	Villar de los Álamos train crash	Train collision	Aldehuela de la Bóveda, Castile and León	
34	1965	Grisén - Pinseque train fire	Train fire	Zaragoza, Aragon	
33	1922	Paredes de Nava train crash	Train accident	Paredes de Nava, Castile and León	
32	1504	Carmona earthquake	Earthquake	Seville, Andalusia	
32	1959	1959 Transair Douglas Dakota accident	Plane crash	Montseny Massif, Catalonia	
32	1978	Muñoz wayside station crossing accident	Train collision	La Fuente de San Esteban, Castile and León	
30	1965	Iberia Flight 401	Plane crash	Tenerife, Canary Islands	
27	2000	Soria bus crash	Traffic collision	Soria, Castile and León	
24	1925	Sarrià train derailment	Train accident	Barcelona, Catalonia	
23	1973	Tapicería Bonafonte fire	Building fire	Zaragoza, Aragon	
23	1987	Cason	Ship sinking	Offshore of Galicia (Galicia (Spain))	
21	1863	Alabern bridge disaster	Train accident	Hostalric, Catalonia	
21	1926	L'Ametlla train derailment	Train accident	L'Ametlla de Mar, Catalonia	
21	1958	1958 Aviaco SNCASE Languedoc crash	Plane crash	Guadarrama Mountains (Castile and León)	
21	1873	Viana de Cega derailment	Train accident	Viana de Cega, Castile and León	
19	2005	Tropical Storm Delta (2005)	Cyclone	Canary Islands	
19	1938	Reus train crash	Train accident	Reus, Catalonia	
19	1915	Frieira train derailment	Train accident	Frieira, Galicia (Galicia (Spain))	
19	2003	Chinchilla train collision	Train accident	Chinchilla de Monte-Aragón, Castilla–La Mancha	
19	1950	Villallana train derailment	Train accident	Lena, Asturias	
17-21	1957	Villaverde Orcasitas train crash	Train collision	Madrid (Community of Madrid)	
17	1976	Imperial Iranian Air Force Flight 48	Plane crash	Madrid (Community of Madrid)	
17	2009	2009 swine flu pandemic in Spain	Pandemic	Spain	
17	2020	Storm Gloria	Cyclone	Northern Spain	
17	1929	Gelida train accident	Train accident	Gelida, Catalonia	
17	1850	Adelaide (shipwrecked 1850)	Ship sinking	Offshore of Galicia (Galicia (Spain))	
15	1988	Juneda train accident	Train collision	Juneda, Catalonian (Catalonia)	
15	1872	Riera de San Jorge bridge disaster	Train accident	L'Ametlla de Mar, Catalonia	
15	1891	Burgos train crash	Train accident	Burgos, Castile and León	
15	1907	Cambrils train derailment	Train accident	Cambrils, Catalonia	
14	2026	2026 Almería wildfire	Wildfire	Almería, Andalusia	
14	1876	Tàrrega derailment	Train accident	Tàrrega, Catalonia	
14	1894	Bilbao - Lezama train derailment	Train accident	Bilbao, Basque Country (Basque Country (autonomous community))	
14	1951	Tortosa train accident	Train accident	Tortosa, Catalonia	
14	1918	Medina del Campo boiler explosion	Train accident	Medina del Campo, Castile and León	
13	2016	Erasmus bus crash	Bus crash	Freginals, Catalonia	
13	2023	Fonda Milagros nightclub fire	Building fire	Murcia (Region of Murcia)	
13	1954	Los Jarales bridge collapse	Bridge collapse	Fregenal de la Sierra, Extremadura	
13	1917	Pozaldez train crash	Train accident	Pozaldez, Castile and León	
12	1956	1956 Atarfe–Albolote earthquake	Earthquake	Granada, Andalusia	
12	1921	Villagonzalo derailment	Train accident	Villagonzalo, Extremadura	
12	2001	Lorca train accident	Train collision	Lorca, Murcia (Region of Murcia)	
12	1922	Ontinyent train crash	Train collision	Ontinyent, Valencian Community	
12	2010	Castelldefels train accident	Train accident	Castelldefels, Catalonia	
11	2015	2015 Los Llanos Air Base crash	Plane crash	Albacete, Castilla–La Mancha	
10	2001	Flightline Flight 101	Plane crash	Offshore of the Columbretes Islands (Valencian Community)	
10	2024	2024 Valencia residential complex fire	Building fire	Valencia, Valencian Community	
