= List of shipwrecks in May 1834 =

The list of shipwrecks in May 1834 includes ships sunk, foundered, wrecked, grounded or otherwise lost during May 1834.

== 2 May ==
List of shipwrecks: 2 May 1834
Ship	State	Description
Burlington	(United Kingdom of Great Britain and Ireland) Jamaica	The sloop was wrecked on Rodney Hall Beach, Jamaica.
Hippomene	Kingdom of Sardinia	The brig was wrecked on the Isle of Pines, Cuba. She was on a voyage from Montevideo, Uruguay to Havana, Cuba.

== 3 May ==
List of shipwrecks: 3 May 1834
Ship	State	Description
Libau (Либау)	Imperial Russian Navy	The transport ship ran aground and was wrecked on the Stapel-botten Bank northwest of Vormsi.

== 7 May ==
List of shipwrecks: 7 May 1834
Ship	State	Description
Diadem	United Kingdom	The barque was wrecked on Cape Gaspé, Lower Canada, British North America.
Edward	United Kingdom	The brig was sunk by ice at "Port Nova". Her crew were rescued.
Isabella	United Kingdom	The brig was wrecked on Cape Rosia, St. Paul Island, Nova Scotia, British North America with the loss of one of the 98 people on board. She was on a voyage from Aberdeen to Quebec City, Lower Canada.
Jane	United Kingdom	The brig was wrecked on St. Paul Island.
Moon	United Kingdom	The brig was wrecked on St. Paul Island. Her crew were rescued.
Patriot	United Kingdom	The brig was wrecked on St. Paul Island.
Rebecca	United Kingdom	The full-rigged ship was sunk by ice near the "Green Bank", off Scatarie Island, Nova Scotia. Her crew were rescued. She was on a voyage from London to Quebec City.

== 8 May ==
List of shipwrecks: 8 May 1834
Ship	State	Description
Astrea	United Kingdom	The barque was wrecked 5 nautical miles (9.3 km) east of Louisbourg, Nova Scotia, British North America with the loss of 208 of the 211 people on board. Astrea was on a voyage from Limerick to Quebec City, Lower Canada, British North America.
Demetrius	(Ottoman Empire) Egypt	The ship was destroyed by fire at Trieste.
Isabella	United Kingdom	The ship was wrecked on St. Paul Island, Nova Scotia with the loss of eight lives. She was on a voyage from Drogheda, County Louth to Quebec City.

== 9 May ==
List of shipwrecks: 9 May 1834
Ship	State	Description
Bee	United Kingdom	The sloop was wrecked at Coleraine, County Antrim. She was on a voyage from Liverpool, Lancashire to Coleraine.

== 10 May ==
List of shipwrecks: 10 May 1834
Ship	State	Description
Charlotte Langan	United Kingdom	The ship foundered in the Atlantic Ocean. All on board took to the boats and were rescued three days later by Waldemar (United States). Charlotte Langan was on a voyage from Liverpool, Lancashire to Philadelphia, Pennsylvania, United States.
Columbus	United Kingdom	The brig was lost 3 nautical miles (5.6 km) east of Louisbourg, Nova Scotia, British North America. Her crew were rescued. She was on a voyage from Newcastle upon Tyne, Northumberland to Quebec City, Lower Canada.
Fidelity	United Kingdom	The brig was wrecked on Scaterie Island, Nova Scotia. All on board, over 150 people, were rescued. She was on a voyage from Dublin to Quebec City.
Marchioness of Queensbury	United Kingdom	The ship was driven ashore at Cape Tormentine, New Brunswick, British North America. All on board were rescued. She was on a voyage from Liverpool, Lancashire to Miramichi, New Brunswick.
Proselyte	United Kingdom	The ship was driven ashore in the Flat Islands, off the coast of Newfoundland, British North America. All on board, over 230 people, were rescued by Juno ( (United Kingdom of Great Britain and Ireland) British North America). Proselyte was on a voyage from Limerick to Quebec City.

== 13 May ==
List of shipwrecks: 13 May 1834
Ship	State	Description
Favourite	United Kingdom	The ship was sunk by ice at St Shott's, Newfoundland, British North America. Her crew were rescued.

== 14 May ==
List of shipwrecks: 14 May 1834
Ship	State	Description
Maria	Hamburg	The ship was sunk by ice in Trinity Bay, Newfoundland, British North America. Her crew were rescued. She was on a voyage from Hamburg to Saint John's, Newfoundland.
Sussex	United Kingdom	The ship was abandoned in the Atlantic Ocean (44°N 28°W), having sprang a leak two days previously. All on board were rescued by Rolla (United Kingdom).

== 17 May ==
List of shipwrecks: 17 May 1834
Ship	State	Description
Margaret	United Kingdom	The ship was wrecked at Barrington, Nova Scotia, British North America. Her crew were rescued. She was on a voyage from Belfast to Saint John, New Brunswick, British North America.
Two Brothers	United Kingdom	The ship was wrecked at Rattray Head, Aberdeenshire. She was on a voyage from East Wemyss, Fife to Peterhead, Aberdeenshire.

== 20 May ==
List of shipwrecks: 20 May 1834
Ship	State	Description
Isabella	United Kingdom	The ship was wrecked on Cape Chat, Lower Canada, British North America with the loss of a crew member. She was on a voyage from Leith, Lothian to Quebec City, Lower Canada.

== 22 May ==
List of shipwrecks: 22 May 1834
Ship	State	Description
Commerce	United Kingdom	The ship was driven ashore and wrecked near Memel, Prussia. Her crew were rescued.

== 23 May ==
List of shipwrecks: 23 May 1834
Ship	State	Description
Abeona	United Kingdom	The collier, a brig, was wrecked on the Brake Sand, in the English Channel. Her crew were rescued. She was on a voyage from Newcastle upon Tyne, Northumberland to Torquay, Devon.
Charlotte Sophia	(Russian Empire) Grand Duchy of Finland	The ship was wrecked on the Kentish Knock, in the North Sea. Her crew took to the boat and were subsequently rescued by Alert (United Kingdom). She was on a voyage from Helsinki to Cádiz, Spain.

== 24 May ==
List of shipwrecks: 24 May 1834
Ship	State	Description
Richard	United Kingdom	The ship capsized in Savanilla Bay. Her crew were rescued. She was on a voyage from Jamaica to Liverpool, Lancashire.

== 25 May ==
List of shipwrecks: 25 May 1834
Ship	State	Description
Triad	United Kingdom	The brig was wrecked on the Heaps Sand, in the North Sea. Her eleven crew survived.

== 26 May ==
List of shipwrecks: 26 May 1834
Ship	State	Description
Bertha	Denmark	The ship was wrecked on the Holme Sand, in the North Sea. She was on a voyage from Faaborg to Hull, Yorkshire, United Kingdom.

== 30 May ==
List of shipwrecks: 30 May 1834
Ship	State	Description
Confidence	France	The ship was driven ashore and wrecked near Warnemünde, Rostock. She was on a voyage from Memel, Prussia to Caen, Calvados.

== Unknown date ==
List of shipwrecks: Unknown date in May 1834
Ship	State	Description
Abeona	United Kingdom	The ship foundered in the Atlantic Ocean before 19 May.
Adelaide	(United Kingdom of Great Britain and Ireland) New South Wales	The cutter was wrecked near Bird Island, Norah Head, New South Wales.
Columbian or Cumbrian	United Kingdom	The ship foundered in the Atlantic Ocean before 19 May. She was on a voyage from Liverpool, Lancashire to Harbour Grace, Newfoundland, British North America.
Fanny	United Kingdom	The ship was wrecked in Torbay. Her crew were rescued.
Goede Frau	Netherlands	The ship was wrecked on the Banjaard sand, in the North Sea on or before 9 May. She was on a voyage from Sète, Hérault, France to Rotterdam, South Holland.
Jane	United Kingdom	The ship was driven ashore on St. Paul Island, Nova Scotia, British North America before 13 May.
John Atkins	United Kingdom	The ship was lost near "Port Nova". She was on a voyage from Halifax, Nova Scotia to Richibucto, New Brunswick.
Sally	United Kingdom	The ship struck a rock and sank at Jersey, Channel Islands.
San Fernando y St. Bela Zaragoza	Spain	The ship was wrecked on the Bahama Banks. She was on a voyage from Havana, Cuba to Cádiz.
Thalia	United Kingdom	The ship was driven ashore at Chittagong, India before 21 May.
