= HMS Adelaide =

Three ships of the British Royal Navy have borne the name HMS Adelaide. They should not be confused with three ships of the Royal Australian Navy named HMAS Adelaide.

The British warships are:

- HMS Adelaide (1827) was a tender, formerly the slaver Josephine, purchased in 1827 and sold in 1833.
- HMS Adelaide (1848) was a tender, formerly a slaver, purchased in 1848 and wrecked in 1850.
- HMS Adelaide was a tender, transferred from the War Department in 1905 as HMS Fidget (1905). She was renamed HMS Adelaide in 1907, HMS Adda in 1915, HMS St Angelo in 1933 and was sold in 1937.

== See also ==
- Adelaide (disambiguation)
- Royal Adelaide (disambiguation)
