= List of shipwrecks in July 1837 =

The list of shipwrecks in July 1837 includes ships sunk, foundered, wrecked, grounded, or otherwise lost during July 1837.

== 2 July ==
List of shipwrecks: 2 July 1837
Ship	State	Description
General Bourke	(United Kingdom of Great Britain and Ireland) New South Wales	The cutter capsized off Sydney Heads. She was on a voyage from the Five Islands to Sydney.
Venus	United Kingdom	The ship was driven ashore on Navy Island.

== 4 July ==
List of shipwrecks: 4 July 1837
Ship	State	Description
Salathiel	United Kingdom	The ship was wrecked near Porto Seguro, Brazil. Her crew were rescued. She was on a voyage from Liverpool, Lancashire to the Rio Grande, Brazil.

== 5 July ==
List of shipwrecks: 5 July 1837
Ship	State	Description
Bob Logie	United Kingdom	The ship was wrecked on Cape Sable Island, Nova Scotia, British North America. Her crew were rescued. She was on a voyage from Saint John, New Brunswick, British North America to Cork.

== 6 July ==
List of shipwrecks: 6 July 1837
Ship	State	Description
Norfolk	United Kingdom	The barque was wrecked at San Antonio, Chile. Her crew were rescued. She was on a voyage from Sydney, New South Wales to an English port.
Superb	United Kingdom	The ship was driven ashore at Hamra, Gotland, Sweden. She was on a voyage from Liverpool, Lancashire to Narva, Russia.

== 7 July ==
List of shipwrecks: 7 July 1837
Ship	State	Description
Adventurer	(United Kingdom of Great Britain and Ireland) New South Wales	The ship was wrecked in Broken Bay. Her three crew survived.
Mary Kimball	United States	The ship was severely damaged by fire. She was on a voyage from Savannah, Georgia to Liverpool, Lancashire, United Kingdom but returned to Savannah.

== 9 July ==
List of shipwrecks: 9 July 1837
Ship	State	Description
Lequeitania	Hamburg	The ship ran aground on the Mewensand, in the North Sea. She was on a voyage from Hamburg to Havana, Cuba. She was refloated the next day and taken into Cuxhaven.
Gledstanes	United Kingdom	This British whaler ran aground and broke up on Ocean Island in the Pacific (now called Kure Atoll) with loss of one life. Marooned on the island the crew built a schooner from the wreckage over the course of many months, and the Captain and 9 others sailed it the 1000 miles to the Hawaiian Islands and arranged for rescue of the remaining crew which occurred on 6 February 1838.

== 10 July ==
List of shipwrecks: 10 July 1837
Ship	State	Description
Eagle	United Kingdom	The ship sank at Dundalk, County Louth. She was on a voyage from Ayr to Dundalk.

== 12 July ==
List of shipwrecks: 12 July 1837
Ship	State	Description
Charles	United Kingdom	The ship was lost off "Soane Island". Her crew were rescued. She was on a voyage from Saint Thomas, Virgin Islands to Saint Domingo.
Rosebud	United Kingdom	The ship was driven ashore and severely damaged at Havana, Cuba. She was on a voyage from Havana to Cowes, Isle of Wight.

== 13 July ==
List of shipwrecks: 13 July 1837
Ship	State	Description
Velocity	United Kingdom	The ship was wrecked at "Granja", Brazil. She was on a voyage from Pernambuco to Aracatu, Brazil.

== 14 July ==
List of shipwrecks: 14 July 1837
Ship	State	Description
Craven	United Kingdom	The ship was driven ashore near Quillebeuf-sur-Seine, Eure, France.
Flora	Stettin	The ship was abandoned in the English Channel. She was on a voyage from Cardiff, Glamorgan, United Kingdom to Stettin. Flora was towed into Portsmouth, Hampshire by HMRC Cracker ( Board of Customs).
Jane	United Kingdom	The ship was wrecked on Dog Island, in the Saint Lawrence River. She was on a voyage from Quebec City, Lower Canada, British North America to Belfast, County Antrim.
Rising Empire	United States	The fishing schooner was run down and sunk while mackereling. Crew saved.

== 15 July ==
List of shipwrecks: 15 July 1837
Ship	State	Description
Duke of Wellington	United Kingdom	The paddle steamer was driven ashore near Aberdeen. She was refloated later that day and taken in to Aberdeen.
Providence	United Kingdom	The ship was damaged by fire and put into Peterhead, Aberdeenshire. The fire was caused by her cargo of quicklime getting wet.
Weser	United Kingdom	The ship was wrecked off Saint Pierre Island. Her crew were rescued. She was on a voyage from Sunderland, County Durham to Bathurst, New Brunswick, British North America.

== 16 July ==
List of shipwrecks: 16 July 1837
Ship	State	Description
Dalmatia	United States	The ship was struck by lightning and destroyed by fire near Boston, Massachusetts.
Fortune	United Kingdom	The ship sank at Berwick upon Tweed, Northumberland. She was on a voyage from Stettin to Berwick upon Tweed.
Friendship	United Kingdom	The ship capsized at Newport, Monmouthshire.
Harriet	United Kingdom	The whaler was wrecked on Providence Reef in the Fiji Islands with the loss of a crew member.
Juno	United Kingdom	The schooner was driven ashore at Bridlington, Yorkshire. She was on a voyage from Newcastle upon Tyne to Leigh-on-Sea, Essex. Juno was refloated and resumed her voyage.
William Sefton	United Kingdom	The ship caught fire in The Wash. Her crew were rescued by Gipsy (United Kingdom). William Sefton was on a voyage from Hull to Wisbech, Cambridgeshire.

== 17 July ==
List of shipwrecks: 17 July 1837
Ship	State	Description
Sydney Packet	(United Kingdom of Great Britain and Ireland) New South Wales	The two-masted schooner was driven ashore and wrecked at Moeraki, South Island, New Zealand after breaking her anchor chains during a gale.
Sylvia	United Kingdom	The ship ran aground and capsized at Newport, Monmouthshire. She was on a voyage from Quebec City, Lower Canada, British North America to Newport. Sylvia had been righted by 21 June.

== 18 July ==
List of shipwrecks: 18 July 1837
Ship	State	Description
Vulcan	United Kingdom	The ship was wrecked near Inhambane, Mozambique.

== 19 July ==
List of shipwrecks: 19 July 1837
Ship	State	Description
Ann	United States	The brig was wrecked on Grand Bahama with the loss of four of her crew.
Sylvia	United Kingdom	The ship capsized at Newport, Monmouthshire. She was on a voyage from Quebec City, Lower Canada, British North America to Newport.

== 20 July ==
List of shipwrecks: 20 July 1837
Ship	State	Description
Theodrick	United Kingdom	The ship capsized at Sligo. She was later refloated.

== 21 July ==
List of shipwrecks: 21 July 1837
Ship	State	Description
Vrow Gesina	Duchy of Holstein	The ship was driven ashore and wrecked on Ameland, Friesland, Netherlands. She was on a voyage from Tönningen to Berwick upon Tweed, Northumberland, United Kingdom.

== 22 July ==
List of shipwrecks: 22 July 1837
Ship	State	Description
Cœlina	United Kingdom	The ship departed from Port-au-Prince, Haiti for Falmouth, Cornwall. No further trace, presumed foundered with the loss of all hands.
Hoffnung	Stettin	The ship departed from Rendsburg, Duchy of Schleswig for Rouen, Seine-Inférieure, France. Presumed subsequently foundered with the loss of all hands.
St. Hilda	United Kingdom	The barque was wrecked near Lagos, Africa with the loss of three of her crew. She was on a voyage from Newcastle upon Tyne, Northumberland to Smyrna, Ottoman Empire.

== 24 July ==
List of shipwrecks: 24 July 1837
Ship	State	Description
Heiress	United Kingdom	The ship ran aground on the Scroby Sands, Norfolk and was damaged. She was on a voyage from Newcastle upon Tyne, Northumberland to Jersey, Channel Islands. Heiress was refloated and taken into Great Yarmouth, Norfolk.
Helena	Hamburg	The ship ran aground on the Vogel Sand, in the North Sea. She floated off but consequently foundered. Her crew were rescued. Helena was on a voyage from Bahia, Brazil to Hamburg.
Nile	United Kingdom	The ship was abandoned in the Atlantic Ocean. All on board were rescued by Placid (United Kingdom).

== 25 July ==
List of shipwrecks: 25 July 1837
Ship	State	Description
Two Brothers	United Kingdom	The smack was wrecked in the "Lindsey Isles", off the coast of Wales with the loss of all hands.

== 26 July ==
List of shipwrecks: 26 July 1837
Ship	State	Description
HMS Alban	Royal Navy	The paddle steamer was driven ashore in a hurricane in Carlisle Bay, Barbados. She had been refloated by 10 August.
Amelia	(United Kingdom of Great Britain and Ireland) Saint Lucia	The schooner was wrecked in a hurricane at Barbados.
Amulet	(United Kingdom of Great Britain and Ireland) British North America	The brig was wrecked in a hurricane at Barbados.
Blaiyais	France	The ship was driven ashore and wrecked on Martinique with the loss of seven of her crew.
Corsair	United Kingdom	The brig was wrecked in a hurricane at Barbados.
Britannia	United Kingdom	The full-rigged ship was damaged in hurricane at Barbados and was beached. She was consequently condemned.
Dame	(United Kingdom of Great Britain and Ireland) British North America	The schooner was wrecked in a hurricane at Barbados.
Eleanor	United Kingdom	The mail boat was driven ashore and wrecked in a hurricane at Nevis.
Elizabeth	United Kingdom	The barque was wrecked in a hurricane at Barbados. Her crew were rescued.
Elizabeth	(United Kingdom of Great Britain and Ireland) British North America	The brig was wrecked in a hurricane at Barbados.
Fortitude	(United Kingdom of Great Britain and Ireland) Barbados	The sloop was wrecked in a hurricane at Barbados.
Gleaner	(United Kingdom of Great Britain and Ireland) Antigua	The schooner was wrecked in a hurricane at Barbados.
Governor Stewart	(United Kingdom of Great Britain and Ireland) Saint Lucia	The drogher was driven ashore in a hurricane at Saint Lucia.
Harmony	United Kingdom	The brig was wrecked in a hurricane at Barbados.
Jane	(United Kingdom of Great Britain and Ireland) British North America	The schooner was wrecked in a hurricane at Barbados.
Janet	(United Kingdom of Great Britain and Ireland) Bahamas	The schooner was wrecked in a hurricane at Barbados.
Jeune Camille	(France) Guadeloupe	The schooner was wrecked in a hurricane at Barbados.
Julias	United Kingdom	The ship was driven ashore and wrecked in a hurricane at Nevis.
Messenger	(United Kingdom of Great Britain and Ireland) Trinidad	The schooner was wrecked in a hurricane at Barbados.
Michael	United Kingdom	The ship was driven ashore and wrecked in a hurricane at Nevis.
Pacific	United Kingdom	The brig was wrecked in a hurricane at Barbados.
Pitscotter	United Kingdom	The brig was wrecked in a hurricane at Barbados.
Sarah Trotman	United Kingdom	The brig was wrecked in a hurricane at Barbados.
Schwartz	United Kingdom	The barque was wrecked in a hurricane on Pelican Reef, off Barbados.
Sir Henry Warde	(United Kingdom of Great Britain and Ireland) British Guyana	The schooner was wrecked in a hurricane at Barbados.
Sir John Moore	(United Kingdom of Great Britain and Ireland) British North America	The brig was wrecked in a hurricane at Barbados.
Tickler	United Kingdom	The steamship was driven ashore in a hurricane at Barbados. She was consequently condemned.
Wave	(United Kingdom of Great Britain and Ireland) Demerara	The schooner was wrecked in a hurricane at Barbados.

== 27 July ==
List of shipwrecks: 27 July 1837
Ship	State	Description
Bonne Aimee	France	The ship was wrecked on the coast of Puerto Rico. Her crew were rescued.

== 28 July ==
List of shipwrecks: 28 July 1837
Ship	State	Description
Admiral	United Kingdom	The ship was driven ashore and wrecked at Portwrinkle, Cornwall with the loss of all three crew.
Andromeda	United Kingdom	The ship foundered in the Indian Ocean 16 nautical miles (30 km) south west of the Juggernaut Pagoda, Puri, India with the loss of four of her crew. She was on a voyage from Calcutta, India to Mauritius.
Britannia	United Kingdom	The ship was wrecked at Pwll Du Point, Glamorgan. Her crew survived.
Friend's Goodwill	United Kingdom	The ship was driven onto the Doom Bar, off Padstow, Cornwall and sank. She was refloated on 31 July and taken in to Padstow in a severely damaged condition.
Governor Douglas	United Kingdom	The ship ran aground on the Doom Bar and was damaged. She was refloated on 31 July and taken in to Padstow.
Juffrow Anna	Danzig	The ship sank near "Adipue". She was on a voyage from Saint-Nazaire, Loire Atlantique to Danzig.
Royal Tar	United Kingdom	The paddle steamer ran aground on the Arklow Bank, in the Irish Sea off the coast of County Wicklow. Her 150 passengers were evacuated. She was on a voyage from London to Dublin.

== 29 July ==
List of shipwrecks: 29 July 1837
Ship	State	Description
Dewdrop	United Kingdom	The ship was driven ashore and damaged at Boscastle, Cornwall.
Ebenezer	United Kingdom	The ship departed from St. Helen's, Isle of Wight for Plymouth, Devon. No further trace, presumed foundered in the English Channel with the loss of all hands.
Gleaner	United Kingdom	The ship was driven ashore at Penzance, Cornwall.
Hope	United States	The ship was abandoned in the South Atlantic off the Cape of Good Hope, Chile. Her crew were rescued by Duke of Roxburgh (United Kingdom). Hope was on a voyage from China to New York.
Jane and Margaret	United Kingdom	The ship was driven ashore and damaged at Boscastle.
John	(United Kingdom of Great Britain and Ireland) Jersey	The ship was driven ashore and damaged at Boscastle.
Margaret	United Kingdom	The ship was driven ashore and severely damaged at Hythe, Kent.
Margaret Ann	United States	The ship was wrecked on Rune Key.
Neptune	United Kingdom	The ship was driven ashore and damaged at Boscastle.
Racer	United Kingdom	The ship was driven ashore at Penzance.
Den Rashe Bonde	Norway	The sloop was wrecked on the Goodwin Sands, Kent, United Kingdom with the loss of three of her five crew. Survivors were rescued by Flora, Po and Royal Sovereign (all United Kingdom). Den Rashe Bonde was on a voyage from Bordeaux, Gironde, France to Christiansand.
Sally Ann	United Kingdom	The ship was driven ashore north of Bude, Cornwall. She was on a voyage from Cardiff, Glamorgan to Plymouth, Devon.
Springflower	United Kingdom	The ship was driven ashore and damaged at Boscastle.
Thornton	United Kingdom	The ship was driven ashore on the coast of Somerset. She was later refloated.
Two Brothers	United Kingdom	The smack was wrecked in the Lindsey Islands, off the coast of Wales with the loss of all hands.

== 30 July ==
List of shipwrecks: 30 July 1837
Ship	State	Description
Alerte	France	The whaler was driven ashore at Talcahuano, Chile.
Dublin Packet	United Kingdom	The ship was wrecked on Beaks Key. Her crew were rescued. She was on a voyage from New Orleans, Louisiana, United States to Boston, Massachusetts, United States and Europe.
Esperance	France	The whaler was driven ashore at Talcahuano.
Mary	United Kingdom	The ship was wrecked on the coast of Caithness. She was on a voyage from Saint John, New Brunswick, British North America to Hull, Yorkshire.
Monk	United Kingdom	The ship was driven ashore at Marbella, Spain. She was on a voyage from Livorno, Grand Duchy of Tuscany to Cork.
Perseverance	United Kingdom	The ship was driven ashore in the River Mersey. She was on a voyage from Liverpool, Lancashire to Demerara. Perseverance was refloated and put back to Liverpool.
Robiner	United Kingdom	The ship was driven ashore and damaged at Montrose, Forfarshire. She was later refloated.
Sophia	Flag unknown	The ship foundered off the Spanish coast. She was on a voyage from St. Ubes, Portugal to "Frederickshall".

== Unknown date ==
List of shipwrecks: Unknown date in July 1837
Ship	State	Description
Adelaide	(United Kingdom of Great Britain and Ireland) New South Wales	The cutter capsized in Broken Bay.
Barbadoes Planter	United Kingdom	The ship was wrecked on the coast of British Honduras before 19 July. She was on a voyage from British Honduras to London.
Charlotte	United Kingdom	The ship was lost off the east coast of Saint Domingo before 14 July. She was on a voyage from Saint Thomas, Virgin Islands to Saint Domingo.
Fultay	Flag unknown	The ship was wrecked on the east coast of Socotra in early July with the loss of six of her crew. She was on a voyage from Surat, India to Mokha.
Gulione	United States	The ship was driven ashore and wrecked on Terschelling, Friesland, Netherlands before 26 July. She was on a voyage from New Bedford, Massachusetts to Bremen.
Harkaway	United Kingdom	The ship ran aground on the Colorados, off the coast of Cuba before 9 July and was abandoned by some of her crew. She was on a voyage from New Orleans, Louisiana, United States To Liverpool, Lancashire. Harkaway was later refloated and resumed her voyage, arriving at Liverpool on 2 July.
Little Pen	United Kingdom	The ship was wrecked in the Abasco Islands before 17 July. She was on a voyage from Liverpool, Lancashire to a port in Tabasco, Mexico.
Providence	United Kingdom	The ship was wrecked on the Knock Sand.
Thornton	United Kingdom	The ship was driven ashore. She was later refloated.
William IV	(United Kingdom of Great Britain and Ireland) British North America	The ship was wrecked on a reef off Prince Edward Island. She was on a voyage from Halifax, Nova Scotia to Quebec City, Lower Canada.
