= List of shipwrecks in September 1888 =

The list of shipwrecks in September 1888 includes ships sunk, foundered, grounded, or otherwise lost during September 1888.

== 1 September ==
List of shipwrecks: 1 September 1888
Ship	State	Description
Burlington	United Kingdom	The steamship collided with the steamship Stelling (United Kingdom) in the River Thames at Gravesend, Kent. She was beached on the Blyth Sand. Burlington was on a voyage from London to Newcastle upon Tyne, Northumberland.
Unnamed	United Kingdom	The ketch was driven ashore on the Nash Sand, in the Bristol Channel.

== 3 September ==
List of shipwrecks: 3 September 1888
Ship	State	Description
Adonis	United Kingdom	The Thames barge was run into by the steamship Trafalgar (United Kingdom) and sank in the River Thames at the entrance to the Regent's Canal.
Carl Johan	Norway	The barque was abandoned in the Atlantic Ocean. Her crew were rescued by the full-rigged ship Tasmanian (United Kingdom). Carl Johan was on a voyage from Liverpool, Lancashire, United Kingdom to Dalhousie, New Brunswick, Canada.
John Bowes	United Kingdom	The steamship struck the pier at the mouth of the River Tyne. She was on a voyage from the River Tyne to London. She put back to the River Tyne, but collided with a jetty at the Tyne Dock. She was beached at Jarrow, County Durham.

== 4 September ==
List of shipwrecks: 4 September 1888
Ship	State	Description
Lealtad	Spanish Navy	The Diligente-class gunboat foundered off Batabanó, Cuba in a hurricane with the loss of all but one of her crew.
Matteo Bruzzo, and Salvador	Italy; France	The steamships collided off Porto Maurizio and were both severely damaged. Three lives were lost. Matteo Bruzzo was on a voyage from Genoa to Buenos Aires, Argentina. She put back to Genoa.
Several unnamed vessels	Flags unknown	The ships foundered in a hurricane off the coast of Cuba with the loss of two lives.
Many unnamed vessels	Flags unknown	The barges sank in a hurricane at Havana, Cuba.
Two unnamed vessels	Flags unknown	The ships were wrecked in a hurricane at Caibarién, Cuba with much loss of life.

== 5 September ==
List of shipwrecks: 5 September 1888
Ship	State	Description
Pulteney	United Kingdom	The ship was damaged at Sunderland, County Durham when a railway wagon fell on her from the coal drops.

== 6 September ==
List of shipwrecks: 6 September 1888
Ship	State	Description
Alfonso	Mexico	The ship was driven ashore in a hurricane at Merida.
Anna	Norway	The brig was driven ashore in a hurricane at Merida. She was on a voyage from Progresso to Rotterdam, South Holland, Netherlands.
E. B. Ward, Jr.	United States	The steamship foundered in a gale in the Gulf of Mexico with the loss of 21 lives.
Emma	United Kingdom	The steamship foundered off Pointe Saint-Mathieu, Finistère, France.
Lewis Clark	United States	The schooner was wrecked at Cape Henlopen. She broke up the next day, a total loss. crew rescued by U.S. Life Saving Service.
Memling, and Prussian	United Kingdom	The steamship Memling collided with the steamship Prussian and sank in the Clyde downstream of Port Glasgow, Renfrewshire. Prussian was on a voyage from Philadelphia, Pennsylvania, United States to Glasgow, Renfrewshire. She was beached.

== 7 September ==
List of shipwrecks: 7 September 1888
Ship	State	Description
Garrison	United Kingdom	The steamship was driven ashore at Bilbao, Spain. She was refloated with the assistance of a steamship and put back to Bilbao.
Lady Flora	United Kingdom	The fishing trawler was run into by the steamship Merthyr (United Kingdom) and sank off Lowestoft, Suffolk. Her crew were rescued by Merthyr.

== 8 September ==
List of shipwrecks: 8 September 1888
Ship	State	Description
Ardencaple, and Earl Wemyss	United Kingdom	The full-rigged ships collided off the coast of Brazil. Ardencaple was on a voyage from Liverpool, Lancashire to Calcutta, India. She was severely damaged. She put in to Fernando de Noronha, Brazil and was abandoned by her crew, her captain and mate remaining on board. Earl Wemyss sank with the loss of sixteen lives. Survivors were rescued by Creedmoor (United Kingdom). She was on a voyage from San Francisco, California, United States to the English Channel.
Fairy	United Kingdom	The ship ran aground on the Haisborough Sands, in the North Sea off the coast of Norfolk and sank. Her crew were rescued by the smack Conqueror (United Kingdom).
Olive	United Kingdom	The ship ran aground on the Middle Ground Sandbank, in the Bristol Channel. She was on a voyage from Dublin to Bristol, Gloucestershire. She was refloated and completed her voyage in a leaky condition.
Walford Green	United Kingdom	The smack was driven ashore and wrecked 3 nautical miles (5.6 km) north of Withernsea, Yorkshire. Her crew were rescued.
William Balls	United Kingdom	The steamship ran aground in the Danube 55 nautical miles (102 km) from its mouth. She was refloated and taken in to Sulina, Romania.

== 10 September ==
List of shipwrecks: 10 September 1888
Ship	State	Description
Eilean Dubh	United Kingdom	The steamship collided with the steamship Annie (United Kingdom) and sank in the Thames Estuary. Her crew were rescued by the steamship London (United Kingdom) Eilean Dubh was on a voyage from Calais, France to London.
Malvina Wendt	Germany	The barque was driven ashore at Flamborough Head, Yorkshire, United Kingdom. She was on a voyage from Sundsvall, Sweden to Hull, Yorkshire. She was refloated and towed in to Hull by a steamship, being waterlogged.

== 11 September ==
List of shipwrecks: 11 September 1888
Ship	State	Description
Penarth	United Kingdom	The steamship was driven ashore at Pezzo Point, Sicily, Italy. She was on a voyage from Antwerp, Belgium to Piraeus, Greece.

== 12 September ==
List of shipwrecks: 12 September 1888
Ship	State	Description
Blue and White	United Kingdom	The schooner struck a floating wreck and foundered in the Atlantic Ocean. Her crew were rescued by the Royal yacht Hirondelle (Monaco). Blue and White was on a voyage from Safi, Morocco to Irvine, Ayrshire.
Britannia	United Kingdom	The steamship ran aground at Port Glasgow, Renfrewshire. She was on a voyage from Bilbao, Spain to the Clyde. She was refloated and resumed her voyage.
Christine	United Kingdom	The ship departed from Guayaquil, Ecuador for Falmouth, Cornwall. No further trace, reported overdue.
France	United Kingdom	The steamship was driven ashore at Barking, Essex. She was refloated and resumed her voyage.
Ivanhoe	United Kingdom	The ship collided with the steamship Jessie Emily and ran aground at Barking.
Lloyd's	United Kingdom	The steamship was driven ashore at Barking. She was refloated and resumed her voyage.
Orleans	United Kingdom	The steamship was driven ashore at Woolwich, Kent. She was refloated and resumed her voyage.
Tom	United Kingdom	The Thames barge was run into by the steamship Ella (United Kingdom) at Wapping, Middlesex and was beached.
Vernon	United Kingdom	The steamship was driven ashore at Woolwich. She was refloated and resumed her voyage.

== 13 September ==
List of shipwrecks: 13 September 1888
Ship	State	Description
Sud America I	Italy	The ocean liner was sunk in a collision with the collier France (France) in the bay at Las Palmas, Gran Canaria, Canary Islands, with the loss of 79 lives.

== 15 September ==
List of shipwrecks: 15 September 1888
Ship	State	Description
Anglo-Indian	United Kingdom	The steamship collided with another steamship off the Varne Lightship ( Trinity House) and was consequently beached at Dover, Kent. Anglo-Indian was on a voyage from the River Plate to Antwerp, Belgium. She was refloated. Following temporary repairs, she resumed her voyage on 17 September.
Clydebank	United Kingdom	The barque arrived at Coquimbo, Chile on fire. The fire was extinguished.
Earl Percy	United Kingdom	The steamship collided with the steamship Wear (United Kingdom) and sank off Whitby, Yorkshire. All on board were rescued. Earl Percy was on a voyage from the River Tyne to Rotterdam, South Holland, Netherlands.
Juga	Canada	The barque was wrecked in a hurricane in the Cayman Islands. Her ten crew survived. She was on a voyage from Montevideo, Uruguay to Ship Island, Newfoundland Colony.

== 16 September ==
List of shipwrecks: 16 September 1888
Ship	State	Description
Lena	United Kingdom	The yacht was driven ashore on Flat Holm, in the Bristol Channel and was abandoned.

== 17 September ==
List of shipwrecks: 17 September 1888
Ship	State	Description
Inga	Norway	The barque was wrecked on Grand Cayman island. She was on a voyage from Montevideo, Uruguay to "Ship Island".
Mula	United Kingdom	The steamship ran aground at Copenhagen, Denmark. She was on a voyage from Tornio, Grand Duchy of Finland to Dublin.
San Martin	France	The steamship ran aground at "Monreveil". She was on a voyage from Pauillac, Gironde to Buenos Aires, Argentina. She was refloated and taken in to Bordeaux, Gironde for repairs.

== 18 September ==
List of shipwrecks: 18 September 1888
Ship	State	Description
Star of Hope	United Kingdom	The lighter was run into by the steamship Contest (United Kingdom) at Goole, Yorkshire. Star of Hope was severely damaged and was beached.

== 19 September ==
List of shipwrecks: 19 September 1888
Ship	State	Description
Lota	Chilean Navy	The frigate foundered in the Pacific Ocean 10 nautical miles (19 km) off "Palmer Island," possibly an island west of Fiji. Her two survivors came ashore on the island, where one died in 1890 and the other finally was rescued by a German ship in 1893.

== 20 September ==
List of shipwrecks: 20 September 1888
Ship	State	Description
Five Brothers	United Kingdom	The Thames barge collided with the steamship Cholmley (United Kingdom) and sank in the River Thames at Woolwich, Kent. Her crew survived.

== 21 September ==
List of shipwrecks: 21 September 1888
Ship	State	Description
Haswell	United Kingdom	The steamship collided with the steamship Vindomora (United Kingdom) and sank in the North Sea off Whitby, Yorkshire. Haswell was on a voyage from Sunderland, County Durham to London.
Tal-y-Fan	United Kingdom	The steamship collided with the tug Mersey King (United Kingdom) and sank in the River Mersey. Her crew were rescued.

== 22 September ==
List of shipwrecks: 22 September 1888
Ship	State	Description
Hastings	United Kingdom	The steamship was run into by the steamship Claudius (United Kingdom) and was abandoned by her crew, who were rescued by Claudius but they subsequently reboarded Hastings, which was taken in tow by the steamship Derwent (United Kingdom), but consequently foundered. Her crew were again rescued.
Cyprus	United Kingdom	The steamship ran aground at Yeşilköy, Ottoman Empire.
Tulford	United Kingdom	The steamship collided with the coal hulk Scotia (United Kingdom) at Gravesend, Kent and was beached. She was on a voyage from London to Cardiff, Glamorgan. She was refloated and resumed her voyage.

== 23 September ==
List of shipwrecks: 23 September 1888
Ship	State	Description
Diana	United Kingdom	The ship departed from West Hartlepool, County Durham for Fedderwardersiel, Germany. No further trace, reported overdue.
Grecian	United Kingdom	The steamship was driven ashore in Culzean Bay. She was on a voyage from Quebec City, Canada to the Clyde.
Unnamed	United Kingdom	The steamship ran aground on the Barber Sand, in the North Sea off the coast of Norfolk.

== 24 September ==
List of shipwrecks: 24 September 1888
Ship	State	Description
Inishtrahull	United Kingdom	The steamship was driven ashore at Lepe, Hampshire. She was on a voyage from Waterford to Southampton, Hampshire.
Simoom	United Kingdom	The steamship arrived at Bristol, Gloucestershire from Kurrachee, India with a smouldering fire on board.

== 26 September ==
List of shipwrecks: 26 September 1888
Ship	State	Description
Erasmus Wilson	United Kingdom	The steamship was damaged by fire at Millwall, Essex.
Fleetwing	United States	The schooner was wrecked on a rocky beach in Lake Michigan off Liberty Grove, Wisconsin, during a gale and eventually sank.
W. W. Graham	United States	The tug was caught in the suction of a foreign vessel she was aiding and capsized and sank off Wilmington, Delaware. Her engineer died. Survivors rescued by Philadelphia (United States).

== 27 September ==
List of shipwrecks: 27 September 1888
Ship	State	Description
Millie	United Kingdom	The Thames barge was run into by the steamship Cygnet and sank at Blackwall, Middlesex. Her crew were rescued.

== 28 September ==
List of shipwrecks: 28 September 1888
Ship	State	Description
Arab	United Kingdom	The schooner was driven on to The Stags, off The Lizard, Cornwall and was abandoned by her four crew and one passenger.. She was on a voyage from Swansea, Glamorgan to Poole, Dorset with coal and subsequently became a wreck.
Diana	United Kingdom	The ship departed from West Hartlepool, County Durham for Fedderwardersiel, Germany. No further trace, presumed foundered.

== 29 September ==
List of shipwrecks: 29 September 1888
Ship	State	Description
Lloyd	Norway	The barque was damaged by an onboard explosion at Newport, Monmouthshire, United Kingdom.
Unnamed	Belgium	The smack was run down and sunk off Ostend, West Flanders by the steamship Prince Baudouin (Belgium) with the loss of three of her five crew.

== Unknown date ==
List of shipwrecks: Unknown date in September 1888
Ship	State	Description
Adelaide	United States	The steam yacht collided with the steamship Providence (United States) and sank.
Admiral	United Kingdom	The smack was driven ashore and wrecked at Cantick Head, South Walls, Orkney Islands.
Alice Bannister	United Kingdom	The schooner ran aground on the Middelgrunden, in the Baltic Sea. She was on a voyage from Danzig, Germany to Littlehampton, Sussex. She was refloated with assistance and resumed her voyage.
Ann	United Kingdom	The ship ran aground in the River Mersey at Garston, Lancashire. She was refloated on 15 September and taken in to Garston.
Bellona	United Kingdom	The barque was destroyed by fire at Valparaíso, Chile. Her crew were rescued.
Bergen	Flag unknown	The steamship was driven ashore at Hanko, Grand Duchy of Finland.
Capulet	United Kingdom	The steamship was driven ashore at Miramichi, New Brunswick, Canada. She was refloated on 10 September with assistance and sailed for Sydney, Nova Scotia, Canada.
Carlton, and Theofil	United Kingdom; Greece	The steamships collided at Constantinople, Ottoman Empire and were both beached.
Caroline	Denmark	The brigantine was abandoned in the North Sea. Her crew were rescued by Diana (Germany).
Cassia, and Hilda	United Kingdom	The steamships collided at Amsterdam, North Holland, Netherlands and were both severely damaged. Cassia was on a voyage from Amsterdam to an English port. Hilda was on a voyage from Cartagena, Spain to Amsterdam.
Ceres	Germany	The barque was wrecked at Coquimbo, Chile. She was on a voyage from Hamburg to Carrizal Bajo, Chile.
Colina	United Kingdom	The ship was driven ashore at San Cataldo, Sicily, Italy. She was refloated and taken in to Brindisi, Italy.
Derby Park	United Kingdom	The barque was wrecked on Penrhyn Island, in the Cook Islands, with the loss of one life. She was on a voyage from the Puget Sound to Melbourne, Victoria.
Dragon	United Kingdom	The ship was abandoned at sea. Her crew were rescued.
Dronning Sophie	Flag unknown	The steamship ran aground at Fraserburgh, Aberdeenshire, United Kingdom.
Ecuador, and Zulu	United Kingdom	The barques collided at Buenos Aires, Argentina and were both severely damaged.
Elm	United Kingdom	The steamship ran aground in the Clyde. She was refloated.
Fairy Queen	United Kingdom	The ship caught fire. The fire was extinguished.
Felix	Flag unknown	The ship was driven ashore in Delagoa Bay and broke her back. She was condemned.
Frutera, and Gyldendore	Flag unknown Norway	The steamship Frutera collided with the barque Gyldendore in the River Mersey. Both vessels were severely damaged. Frutera was on a voyage from Patras, Greece to Liverpool, Lancashire, United Kingdom. Gyldendore was on a voyage from Liverpool to Vyborg, Grand Duchy of Finland.
Furnessia	United Kingdom	The steamship ran aground in the Clyde downstream of Bowling, Dunbartonshire.
Gambetta	Norway	The steamship was driven ashore at "Sondrerosse". She was on a voyage from Königsberg, Germany to Hartlepool, County Durham, United Kingdom. She was refloated on 29 September and taken in to Copenhagen for repairs.
Glen Livet	United Kingdom	The steamship collided with another vessel in the Clyde. She was beached near Bowling. She was refloated on 21 September and taken in the Glasgow, Renfrewshire.
Hector	United Kingdom	The steamship ran aground on the Herd Sands, in the North Sea off the mouth of the River Tyne. She was later refloated and taken in to South Shields, County Durhm.
Hesleden	United Kingdom	The steamship was driven ashore at Kertch, Russia. She was later refloated.
Hughenden, and Ybaizabal	United Kingdom; Spain	The steamships collided off Albufeira, Portugal. Hughenden sank with the loss of three of her crew. Ybaizabal was beached. She was later refloated and resumed her voyage.
Ideal	Norway	The schooner ran aground at Saltholm, Denmark. She was on a voyage from Härnösand, Sweden to Lisbon, Portugal.
Iris	United Kingdom	The steam yacht ran aground at Greenock, Renfrewshire.
Itchen	United Kingdom	The steamship was driven ashore west of Hartland Point, Devon. She was later refloated and towed to Swansea, Glamorgan for repairs.
J. M. Lennard	United Kingdom	The steamship was driven ashore on Zakynthos, Greece. She was refloated and taken in to Gibraltar in a leaky condition.
Johann Wilhelm	Germany	The barque was driven ashore on Amager, Denmark. She was refloated with the assistance of a steamship.
Kincardine	United Kingdom	The steamship struck rocks and sank in the "Entreport River".
Krimpen aan de Lek	Netherlands	The ship ran aground in the "Agniten Islands". She was on a voyage from Cardiff, Glamorgan to Batavia, Netherlands East Indies. She was refloated but had to be beached.
Lizzie English	United Kingdom	The ship ran aground in the Drogden. She was on a voyage from Riga, Russia to London.
Loadstar	Flag yacht ran aground on the Horn Reef, in the Baltic Sea.	{{{desc}}}
Marie	Netherlands	The brig was abandoned in the Atlantic Ocean before 28 September. Her crew were rescued. Shte was on a voyage from St. Martin's to Philadelphia, Pennsylvania.
Mary Watkins	United Kingdom	The schooner foundered off Cape Carvoeiro, Portugal. Her six crew were rescued. She was on a voyage from Bridgwater, Somerset to Marseille.
Minerva	United Kingdom	The steamship ran aground at Redcastle, County Donegal.
Mlawka	Germany	The steamship ran aground at Maassluis, South Holland, Netherlands. She was on a voyage from Danzig to Rotterdam, South Holland.
Morning Star	United Kingdom	The ship was driven ashore and wrecked in Ballyfrenan Bay, County Down. She was on a voyage from Greenock to Berbice, British Guiana.
Mourino	United Kingdom	The steamship ran aground on the Svalerumpen, in the Baltic Sea. She was on a voyage from Kronstadt, Russia to Hull, Yorkshire. She was refloated and resumed her voyage.
Nenuphar	United Kingdom	The ship collided with the quayside at Punta Lara, Argentina and was severely damaged.
Nordcap	Norway	The barque was driven ashore and wrecked at Chatham, New Brunswick.
Nordenfelt	Flag unknown	The steam yacht ran aground on the Horn Reef. She was on a voyage from Southampton, Hampshire to Saint Petersburg, Russia.
Orion	Netherlands	The barque was driven ashore on Borkum, Germany.
Provin	Norway	The barque ran aground on the Middelgrunden. She was on a voyage from Sundsvall, Sweden to London. She was refloated with assistance.
Queen Emma	United Kingdom	The brig was driven ashore and wrecked at Hasle, Bornholm, Denmark. Her crew were rescued. She was on a voyage from Helsingborg, Sweden. to Härnösand
Reading	United Kingdom	The steamship was driven ashore at Tunara, Spain and was subsequently abandoned by her crew. She was on a voyage from Odesa, Russia to London.
Respigadera	Flag unknown	The ship was driven ashore and wrecked at Point Fermin, California, Her crew were rescued.
Rjukan	United Kingdom	The brig was driven ashore and wrecked at Cabo São Roque, Brazil. Her crew were rescued.
Samouna	Norway	The barque was driven ashore at "Kvalnasset".
Sir Galahad	United Kingdom	The steamship ran aground at the South Stack, Anglesey. She was refloated and taken in to Holyhead, Anglesey waterlogged at the bow.
Stadsman	Flag unknown	The steamship was driven ashore at "Geddar". She was on a voyage from Luleå, Sweden to Boulogne, Pas-de-Calais, France. She was refloated and taken in to "Furnsund", Sweden for repairs.
St. Johannes	Norway	The barque ran aground at Dragør.
Strathearn	United Kingdom	The full-rigged ship caught fire in the Pacific Ocean. She was on a voyage from Swansea to San Francisco, California. The fire was extinguished.
Talisman	United Kingdom	The steamship collided with the quayside at Dunkirk, Nord, France and sank. She was on a voyage from Leith, Lothian to Dunkirk.
Theta	Norway	The barque was lost at Merida. She was on a voyage from Jamaica to Havre de Grâce, Seine-Inférieure, France.
Viera y Clavigo	United Kingdom	The steamship ran aground at Las Palmas, Canary Islands.
Walter Thomas	United Kingdom	The steamship ran aground at Maassluis. She was on a voyage from Odesa to Rotterdam. She was later refloated.
Warrior	United Kingdom	The steamship collided with the steamships Olaf and Opal (Flags unknown) and was beached at Saint Petersburg.
Yorkshire	United Kingdom	The steamship ran aground in the Elbe at Schulau, Germany. She was on a voyage from Hamburg to Chile.
Unnamed	Argentina	The lighter sank at Buenos Aires.
Two unnamed vessels	Russia	The lighters sank at Saint Petersburg.
Unnamed	France	The steam lighter collided with the steamship Brestois (France) and sank at Bordeaux, Gironde.
