= North Adelaide (disambiguation) =

North Adelaide is a suburb in South Australia.

North Adelaide may also refer to the following places and organisations in South Australia.

- Electoral district of North Adelaide, a former electorate
- North Adelaide Fire Station, a former fire station
- North Adelaide Football Club, an Australian Rules football club
- North Adelaide Grammar School, a former school
- North Adelaide Lacrosse Club, a lacrosse club
- North Adelaide railway station, a former railway station

== See also ==
- Adelaide (disambiguation)
- North Adelaide District Football Association
