= City of Adelaide (disambiguation) =

City of Adelaide is the local government area of the Adelaide metropolitan area in South Australia. It includes the municipal authority that runs the City of Adelaide, formerly Adelaide City Council.

City of Adelaide may also refer to the following ships:

- SS City of Adelaide, several steamships
- City of Adelaide (1838), a sailing ship
- City of Adelaide (1864), a clipper ship

== See also ==
- Adelaide (disambiguation)
