= Queen Adelaide (disambiguation) =

Queen Adelaide (Adelaide of Saxe-Meiningen, 1792–1849) was the consort of William IV, King of the United Kingdom.

Queen Adelaide may also refer to:

== People ==
- Saint Adelaide of Italy, also called Adelaide of Burgundy (931/932–999), queen of Italy and Germany
- Adelaide of Paris (died 901), queen of the West Franks
- Adelaide of Aquitaine (died 1004), queen of the Franks
- Adelaide of Rheinfelden, queen of Hungary
- Adelaide del Vasto (c. 1075–1118), queen of Jerusalem
- Adelaide of Maurienne (1092–1154), queen of the Franks
- Adelaide of Vohburg (1125–1187), queen of Germany
- Adelaide of Champagne (1140–1206), queen of the Franks
- Adelaide of Meissen (1160–1211), queen of Bohemia
- Adelaide of Hesse (1323–1371), queen of Poland
- Adelaide of Austria (1822–1855), queen of Sardinia
- Adelaide of Löwenstein-Wertheim-Rosenberg (1831–1909), wife of Miguel I of Portugal after his deposition

== Places ==
- Queen Adelaide, Cambridgeshire, England
- Queen Adelaide Province, former name of British Kaffraria in South Africa

== Buildings ==
- The Queen Adelaide, a pub in Shepherd's Bush, London
- The Queen Adelaide (Bethnal Green), a pub in Bethnal Green, London

== See also ==
- Adelaide (disambiguation)
