= Adelaide River (disambiguation) =

Adelaide River is a river in the Northern Territory of Australia.

Adelaide River may also refer to:

- Adelaide River, Northern Territory, a town in the Northern Territory of Australia
- Adelaide River (Brazil), a river in Paraná state in southern Brazil
- Adelaide River railway station, a former railway station in the Northern Territory of Australia
- Adelaide River virus, a negative-sense single-stranded RNA virus of the family Rhabdoviridae

== See also ==
- Adelaide (disambiguation)
