= SS City of Adelaide =

SS City of Adelaide may refer to one of three steamships named after the Australian city of Adelaide:

- SS City of Adelaide, launched in 1863. She was converted to a barque in 1890, hulked in 1902 and ran aground in 1916.
- SS City of Adelaide, launched in 1916 and operated by Ellerman Lines. She was sunk by a submarine in 1918.
- SS City of Adelaide, launched in 1920 and operated by Ellerman Lines. She was sunk by a submarine in 1944.

== See also ==
- City of Adelaide (1864), a clipper ship launched in 1864. She was renamed Carrick in 1923, and City of Adelaide in 2001.
- MV City of Adelaide, a cargo vessel launched in 1963, renamed Cap Cleveland in 1972, City of Canterbury in 1973, Rubens in 1975 and A. L. Pioneer in 1983. She was scrapped in 1983.
- City of Adelaide (disambiguation)
