= Royal Adelaide =

Royal Adelaide may refer to:

- Royal Adelaide Hospital, a hospital in Adelaide, South Australia
- Royal Adelaide Show, an agricultural show in Adelaide, South Australia
- Royal Adelaide Golf Club, a golf club in Adelaide, South Australia

== Ships ==
- HMS Royal Adelaide (1828), a 104-gun first-rate ship of the line of the Royal Navy
- Royal Adelaide (1834), a miniature frigate built by William IV and dismantled in 1877
- RMS Royal Adelaide (1838), a paddle steamer sunk off Kent in 1850
- Royal Adelaide (1865), an iron sailing ship sunk in Lyme Bay in 1872

== See also ==
- Adelaide (disambiguation)
