= Adelaide Street =

Adelaide Street may refer to:

- Adelaide Street, Brisbane, Australia
- Adelaide Street, Fremantle, Australia
- Adelaide Street, London, England
- Adelaide Street, Oxford, England
- Adelaide Street, Toronto, Canada

== See also ==
- Adelaide Street Circuit, Adelaide, Australia
- Adelaide Street Court House, Toronto, Canada
