= 1870 Barcelona yellow fever epidemic =

Disease outbreak in Barcelona, Spain

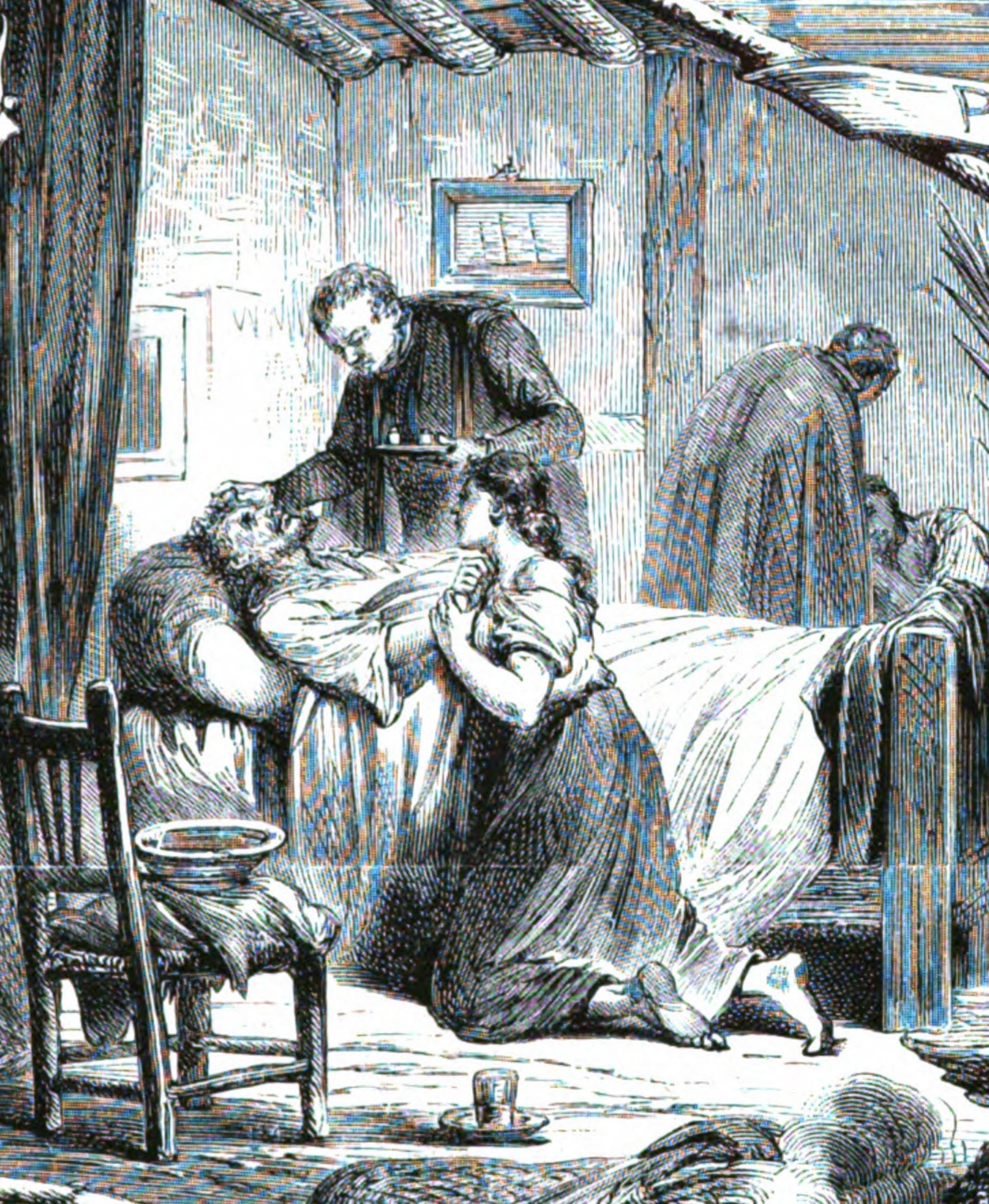
- Disease: Yellow fever
- Location: Barcelona, Spain
- Date: 1870
- Confirmed cases: 1235

The 1870 Barcelona yellow fever epidemic was an epidemic that took place in the Spanish city of Barcelona in 1870.

The epidemic started in August 1870 and lasted to the end of the year. The yellow fever virus is transmitted via a species of invasive mosquitoes called Aedes aegypti. The yellow fever was brought to the city by a ship that had arrived from Cuba, but the mosquitoes failed to survive Barcelona's cold weather conditions in December 1870.

== History ==
In the late 19th century, Barcelona was known as a commercial port city with a harbor that connected the city to other cities and countries. The harbor was crucial for trade, exchange of ideas, and overall contact with the foreign world. Yellow fever was one of the diseases the people of Barcelona suffered from due to such contact. The yellow fever virus is transmitted via a species of invasive mosquitoes called Aedes aegypti.

== The Epidemic ==
The yellow fever was brought to the city by a ship that had arrived from Cuba. The yellow fever epidemic occurred during late 1870, beginning in August to the end of the year. There were a total of 1235 deaths; 468 women and 767 men. The epidemic ended due to the city following hygienic measures and the mosquitoes not surviving Barcelona's cold weather conditions in December 1870. These mosquitoes are said to be great carriers of the yellow fever virus and have led to larger outbreaks throughout other places in Europe.

== Similar Incident ==
There were two epidemics of the same disease had taken place previously in Barcelona. One took place in 1803 while the other in 1821. The estimated number of people killed in 1821 is said to be either 3,251, 6,244, or more than 8,000. There was, also in the 19th century, another epidemic that had occurred in Wales. The 1865 South Wales epidemic occurred due to the arrival of a boat filled with infected passengers and A. aegypti mosquitos.
