= Torremontalbo =

- Municipality
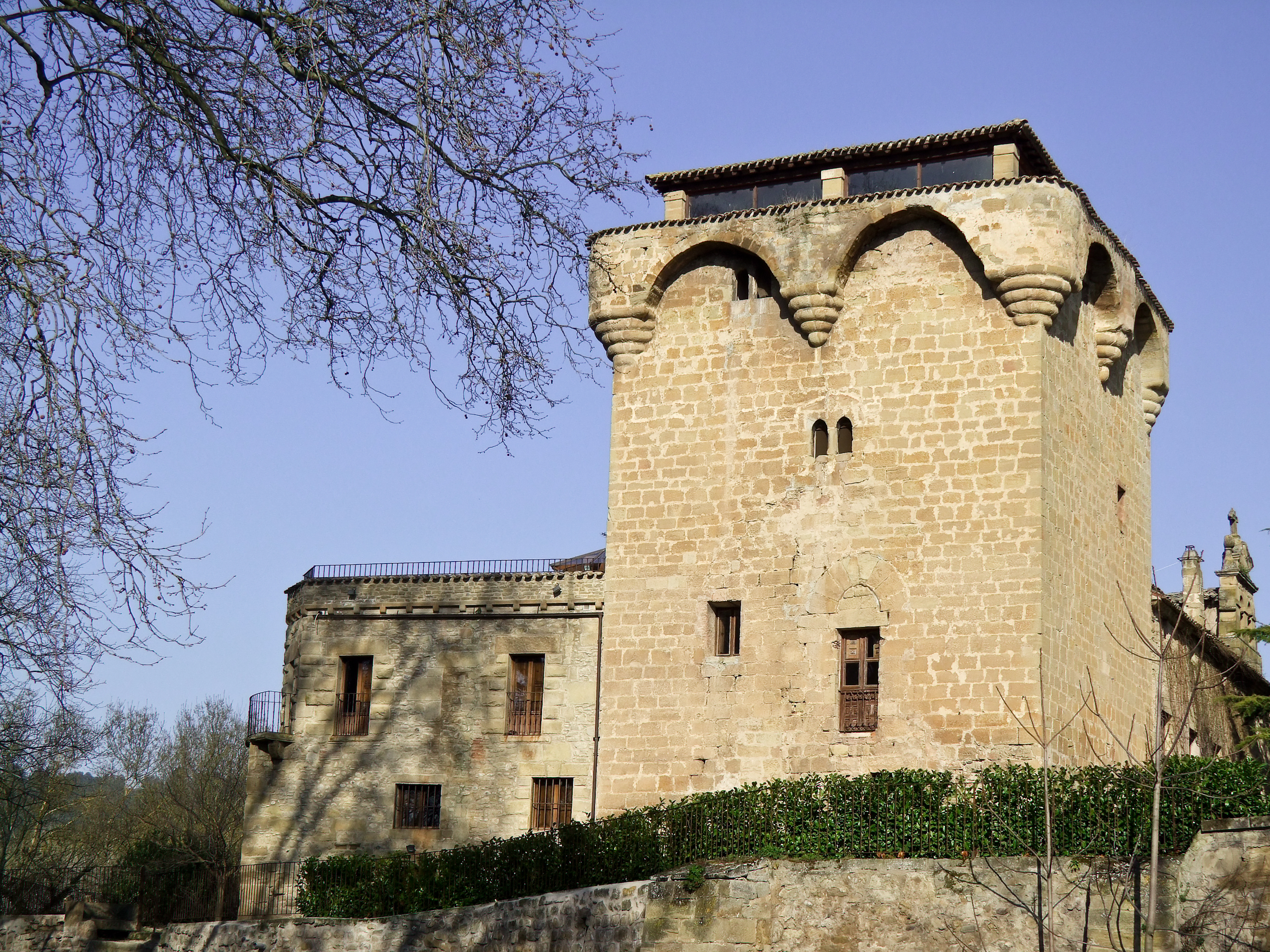
- Fortified Tower

- Location within La Rioja, Spain Location within Spain
- Coordinates: 42°30′01″N 2°41′06″W
- Country: Spain
- Autonomous community: La Rioja
- Comarca: Logroño

Government
  - Mayor: Jorge Manso de Zúñiga Ugartechea (Candidatura Independiente de Torremontalvo)

Area
  - Total: 4.96 km^{2} (1.92 sq mi)
- Elevation: 424 m (1,391 ft)

Population (2025-01-01)
  - Total: 7
- Demonym(s): torremontalbés, sa
- Postal code: 26359

Torremontalbo is a municipality in the province and autonomous community of La Rioja, Spain, situated at the foot of the N-232 road (Spain). The municipality covers an area of 8.07 square kilometres (3.12 sq mi) and as of 2011 had a population of 14 people.
