= Adelaide (1879) =

Schooner

History
- Name: Adelaide
- Owner: Chapman Bonner Bond
- Port of registry: Sydney 28/1880 75062
- Route: Newcastle to Gisborne, New Zealand
- Builder: Unknown Pyrmont, Sydney Harbour, New South Wales, Australia
- Completed: 1879
- Fate: Wrecked 1898/05 Newcastle, New South Wales to New Zealand

General characteristics
- Type: Wood Schooner
- Tonnage: 217 GRT
- Displacement: 190 NRT
- Length: 44.1 m
- Beam: 7.1 m
- Draught: 2.7 m

Adelaide was a wooden schooner that was lost after leaving Newcastle, New South Wales carrying a load of coal on a voyage to Gisborne, New Zealand in May 1898. There were two deaths.
