= Port Adelaide (disambiguation) =

Port Adelaide is the port of the South Australian capital of Adelaide.

It may also refer to:

- Division of Port Adelaide - an electorate for the Australian House of Representatives
- Electoral district of Port Adelaide - an electorate for the South Australian House of Assembly
- Hundred of Port Adelaide, a cadastral unit
- Port Adelaide Football Club - a club that competes in the Australian Football League (AFL) and the South Australian National Football League (SANFL)
- Port Adelaide Lighthouse, a decommissioned lighthouse
- Port Adelaide railway station
- Port Adelaide River, the official name for the Port River
- Port Adelaide Workers Memorial
