= 2023 Canary Islands migrant boat disaster =

2023 sinking of dinghy off West Africa

- Date: 21 June 2023
- Location: Canary Islands, Spain
- Type: Maritime disaster
- Deaths: 35–39

On 21 June 2023, a rubber dinghy carrying migrants sank off the coast of the Canary Islands in Spain. Between 35 and 39 people were killed.

== Background ==
In recent years, widespread conflict and instability, border closures relating to the COVID-19 pandemic, and increased controls in North African countries have birthed an industry of smuggling migrants into Europe. Spain has seen an influx of migrants as part of this broader surge into Europe. Though some opt to head to the country via the Mediterranean, the Canaries have become the primary destination for migrants fleeing to Spain, with nearly 6,000 people disembarking in the Canaries from the start of 2023 to 15 June. Statistics from the United Nations demonstrate that a little under 30,000 people arrived in Spain via sea in 2022 and close to 42,000 in 2021. The early summer is peak season for migrants crossing the Mediterranean.

With the surge in traffic, the route towards the Canaries have seen an increase in dangerous and fatal incidents. The Atlantic route to the Canaries has become infamously dangerous, with hundreds dying each year. According to the International Organization for Migration (IOM), of the 2,556 people who died attempting to reach Europe in 2022, 1,126 were traversing across the Atlantic route to Spain from West Africa. Earlier in the week that the dinghy sunk, a pregnant woman had died aboard a dinghy while attempting to reach Spain. She was aboard a ship near the island of Lanzarote. Additionally, on 19 June, a trawler detected a migrant boat near Mogán, Gran Canaria, carrying 53 passengers that were in poor health.

== Incident ==
Approximately 60 people were aboard the vessel. On the evening of 20 June, the Maritime Safety and Rescue Society (SASEMAR) received a call from the dinghy. A plane departing from the Canaries detected the vessel 70 kilometres (43 mi) off the African coast and 160 kilometres (99 mi) south of the archipelago. A SASEMAR spokesperson stated that the crew reported no immediate signs of distress or issues on the boat.

Early on 21 June, Alarm Phone, a European NGO, reported that the vessel was taking on water, adding that three passengers were deceased. The organization proceeded to call for an immediate rescue of the migrants. A SASEMAR spokesperson stated that "The boat got into difficulty and sank."

== Victims ==
By 22 June, there were statements that either 35 (according to Alarm Phone) or 39 people (according to a spokesperson from Colectivo Caminando Fronteras (lit. "Walking Borders Collective"), including a minor, had died in the incident.
