= Bird Island Nature Reserve =

Protected area in New South Wales, Australia

- IUCN category Ia (strict nature reserve)
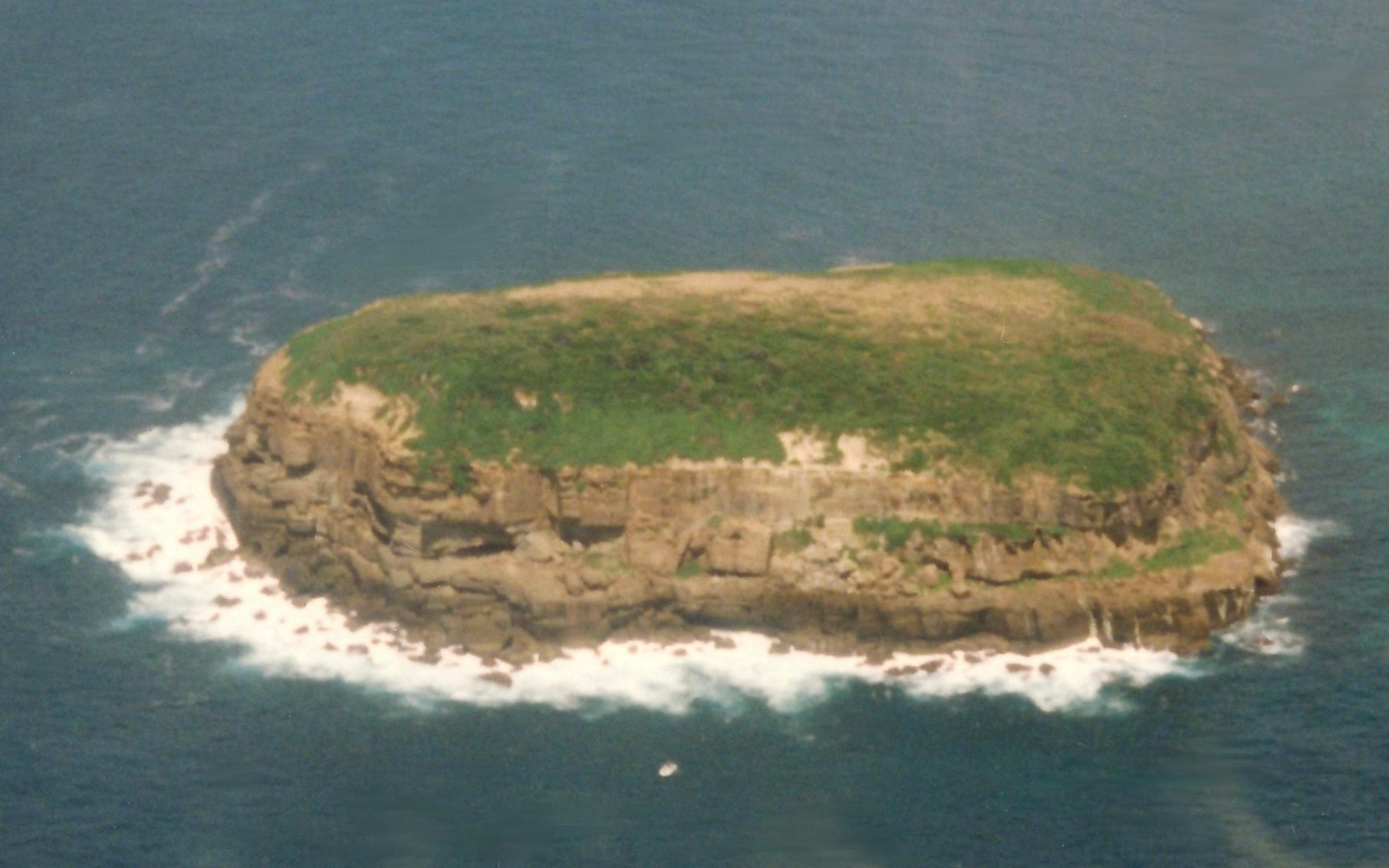

- Location within New South Wales
- Location: New South Wales
- Nearest city: Budgewoi
- Coordinates: 33°13.77′S 151°36.14′E
- Established: June 1960
- Visitors: less than 10
- Governing body: NSW National Parks & Wildlife Service
- Website: http://www.environment.nsw.gov.au/NationalParks/parkHome.aspx?id=N0407

The Bird Island Nature Reserve is a protected nature reserve located near Lake Munmorah on the Central Coast region of New South Wales, Australia. The island is situated 1.4 kilometres (0.87 mi) off the east coast of New South Wales, within the Tasman Sea. The reserve may be seen from the lighthouse at Norah Head.

== Features ==
The island reaches a height of around 20 metres (66 ft) above sea level, and the prominent rocky cliffs make access difficult by boat. The island was once part of the Australian mainland, however it separated four to six thousand years ago with rising sea levels. The geology of the island is sedimentary rocks from the Sydney Basin. The island is roughly circular in shape, not more than 260 metres (850 ft) long at any point.

== Fauna ==
No introduced animals have been recorded on Bird Island Nature Reserve.

=== Birds ===
Over twenty types of birds have been recorded on the island. Up to 7,000 pairs of wedge-tailed shearwaters and short-tailed shearwaters breed on the island. The sooty oystercatcher is listed as a threatened species. Other birds include, ruddy turnstone, eastern curlew, whimbrel, bar-tailed godwit, red-necked stint, Arctic jaeger, Caspian tern, common tern, white-fronted tern, white-faced storm petrel, eastern reef egret, little penguin, black cormorant, little black cormorant, white-breasted sea eagle, whistling kite and little tern. Land birds such as the Australian raven, little grassbird and welcome swallow have been recorded. A pair of peregrine falcons breed on the island; their main food consists of young white-faced storm petrels.

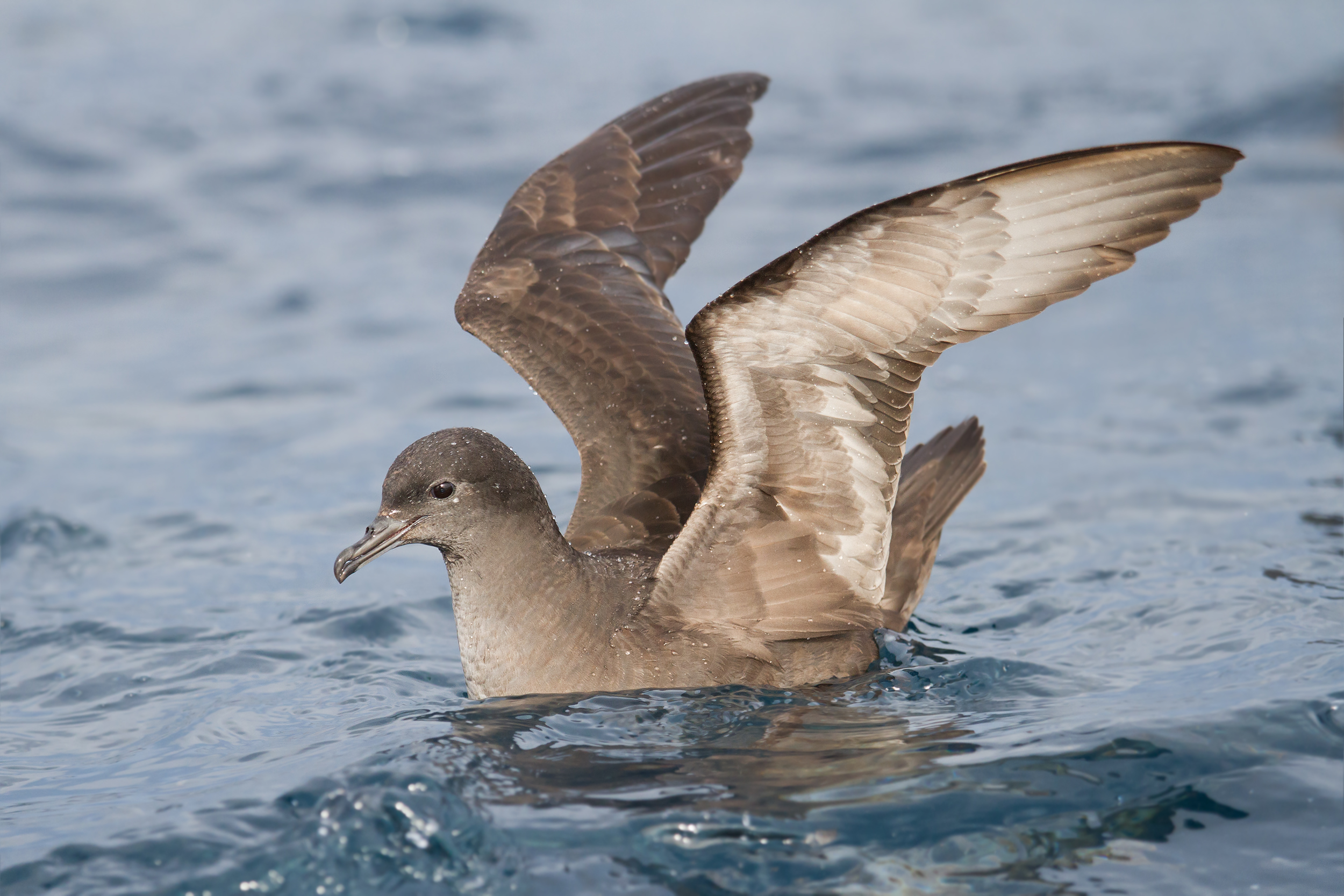
Short-tailed shearwater

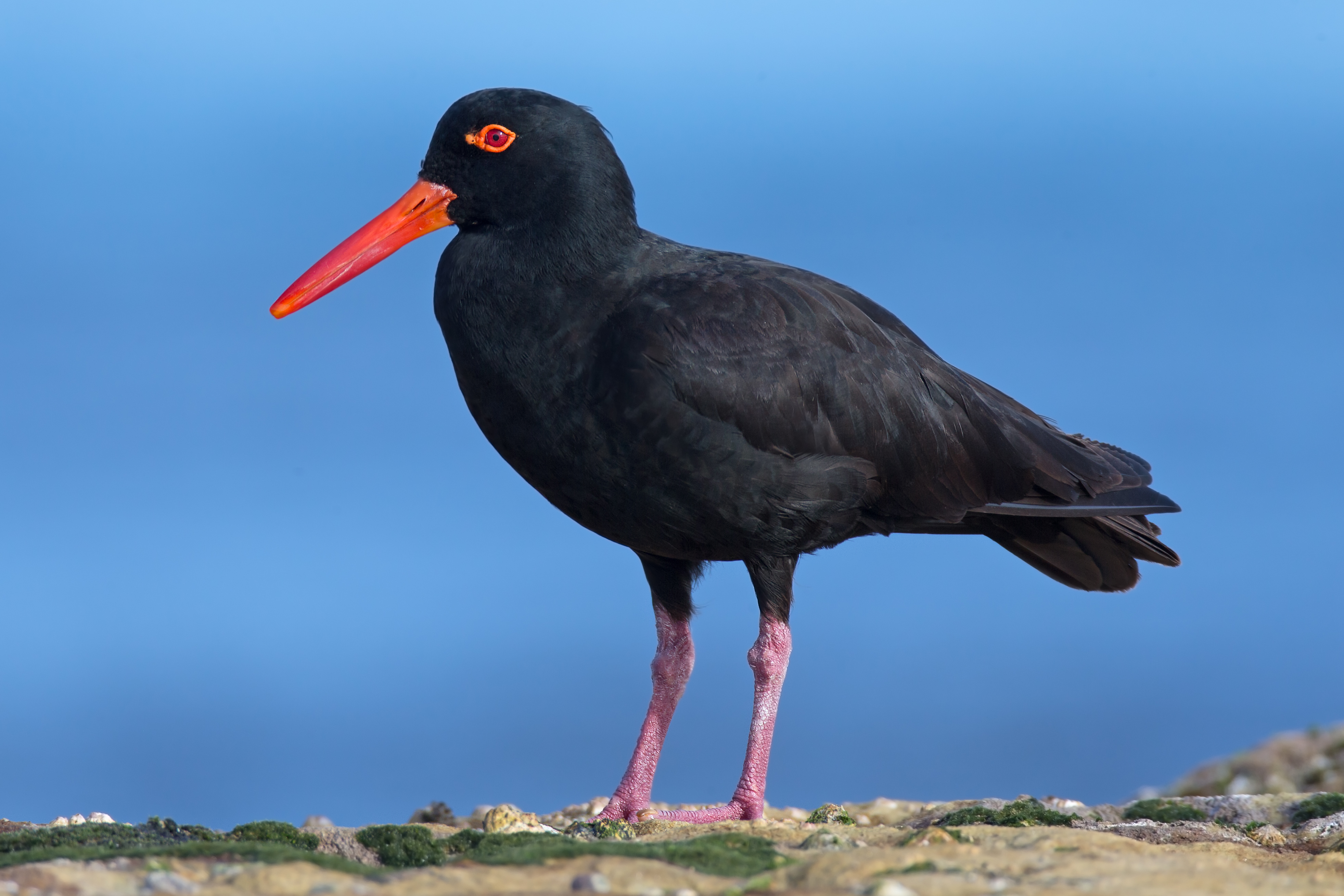
Sooty oystercatcher

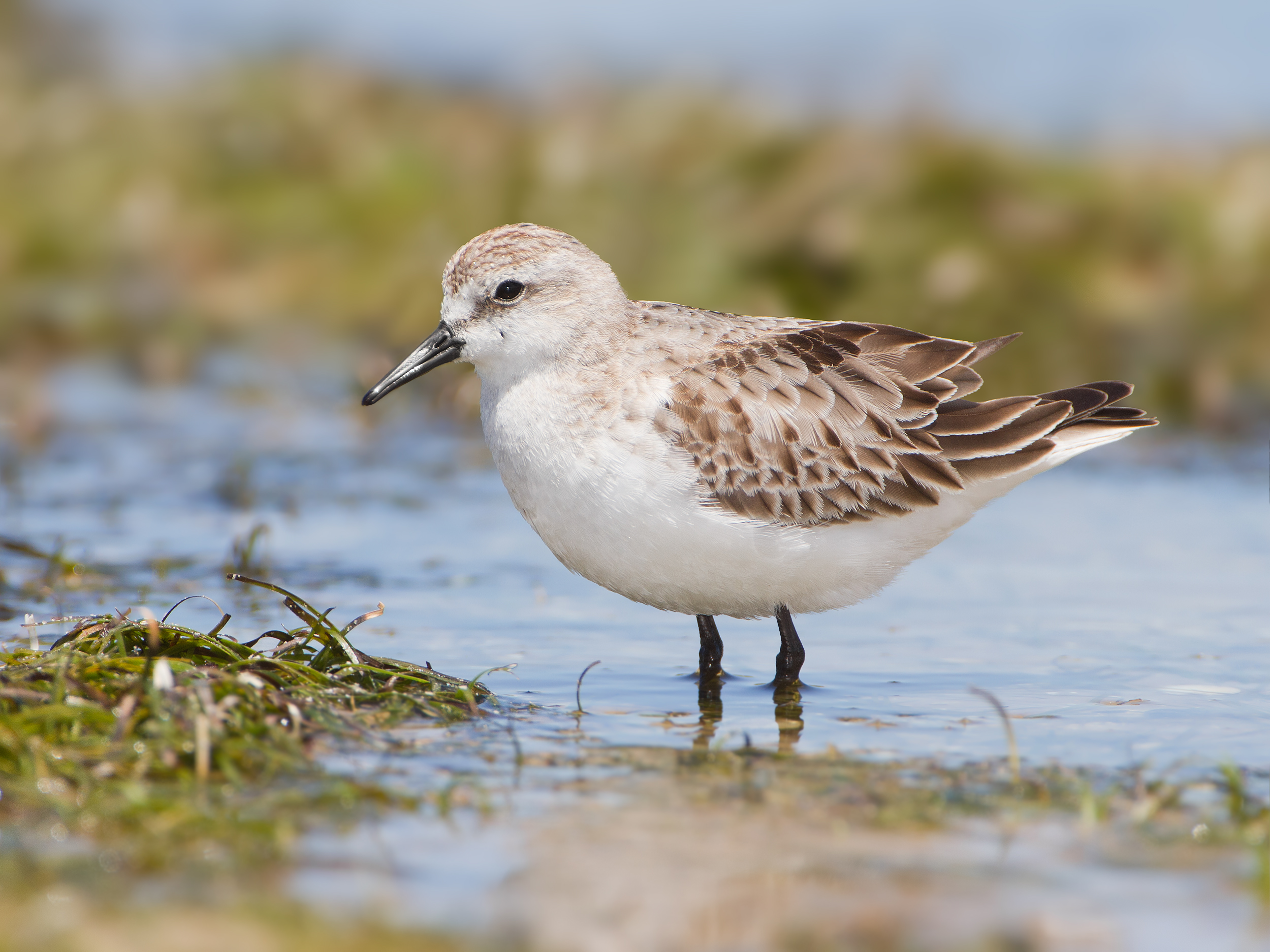
Red-necked stint

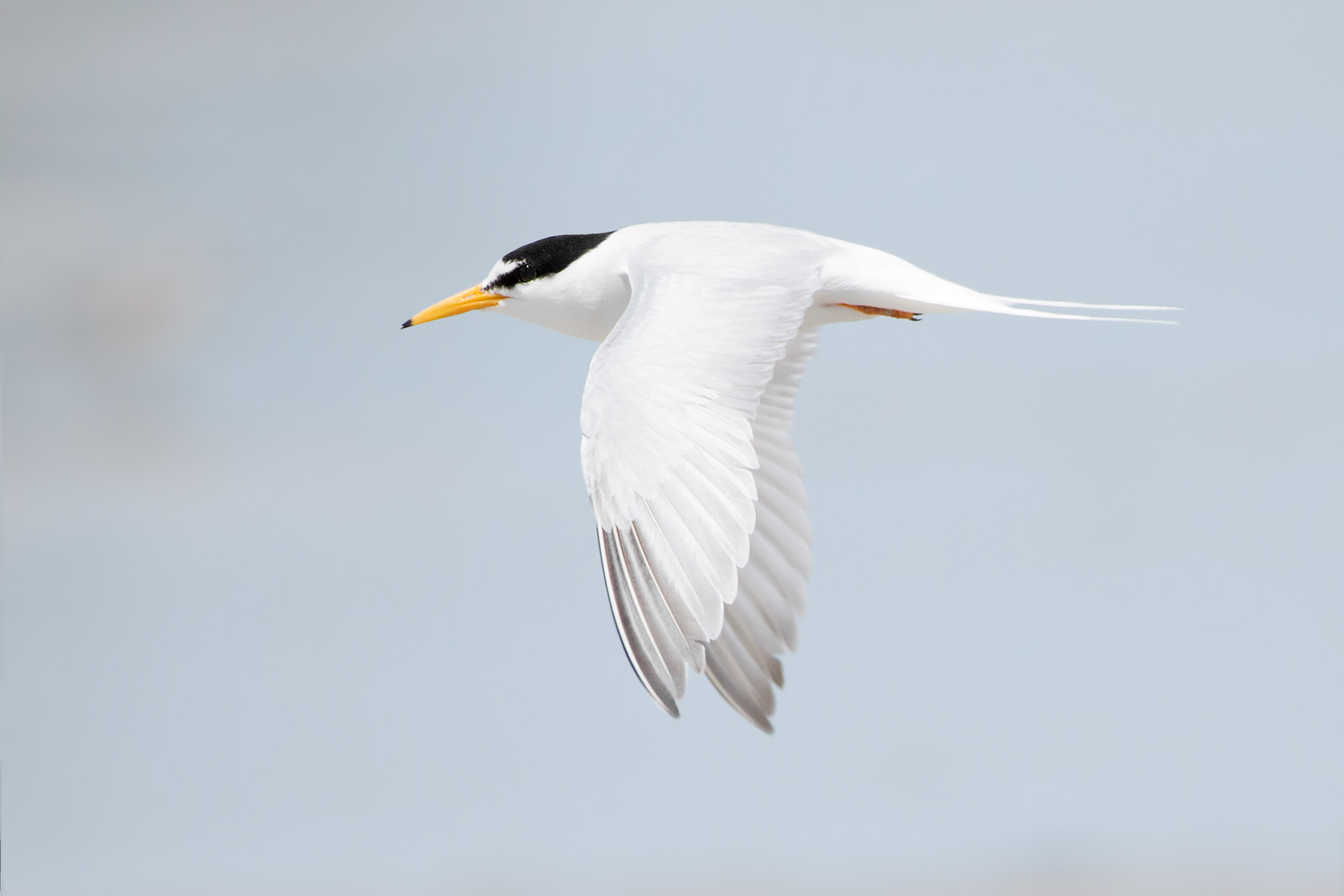
Little tern

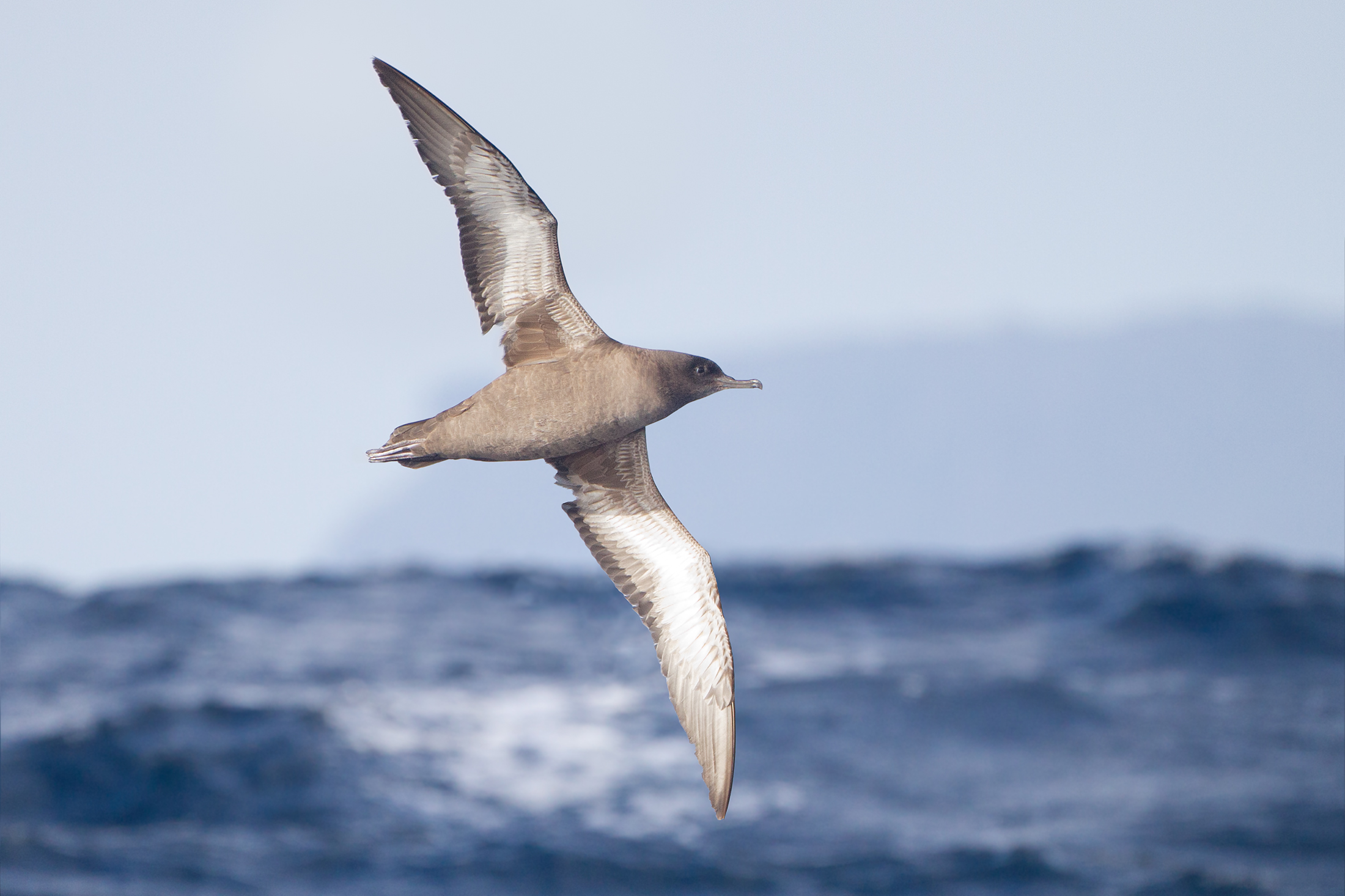
Sooty shearwater

=== Lizards ===
Two types of lizards have been recorded, an unidentified skink and the jacky lizard. The jacky lizard has an unusual pink mouth. No terrestrial mammals or amphibians are known here.

== Flora ==
Two types are recognised. A low open heathland with tree broom heath, an unusual variety of the Sydney golden wattle, tuckeroo, and the coastal tea tree. The flora on the more exposed areas has pigface, a tussock grass and a long stalked form of Lomandra.

=== Weeds ===
Despite the island's isolation and very few visitors, weeds are present. They include bitou bush, prickly pear, inkweed and trad. Bitou bush is affected by disease. The prickly pear can spread and diminish the area for bird's nesting sites. However, control has been sought with the use of the Cochineal insect.

== Aquatic life ==
The shallow waters near the island support blue groper, Port Jackson sharks, stingrays and cuttlefish. Reef fish and many other creatures may be found in the gutters and caves near the rocky shores. Dolphins, seals, turtles and other large animals may be seen near the island. Humpback whales swim near the island during their annual migration to and from Antarctica.

== Shipwrecks ==
A number of shipwrecks occurred at or near Bird Island. They include the Adelaide and Allenwood.

== Military use ==
This site was an RAAF bombing range during WWII.

== See also ==
- Protected areas of New South Wales
