= North Adelaide Fire Station =

Heritage-listed building in South Australia

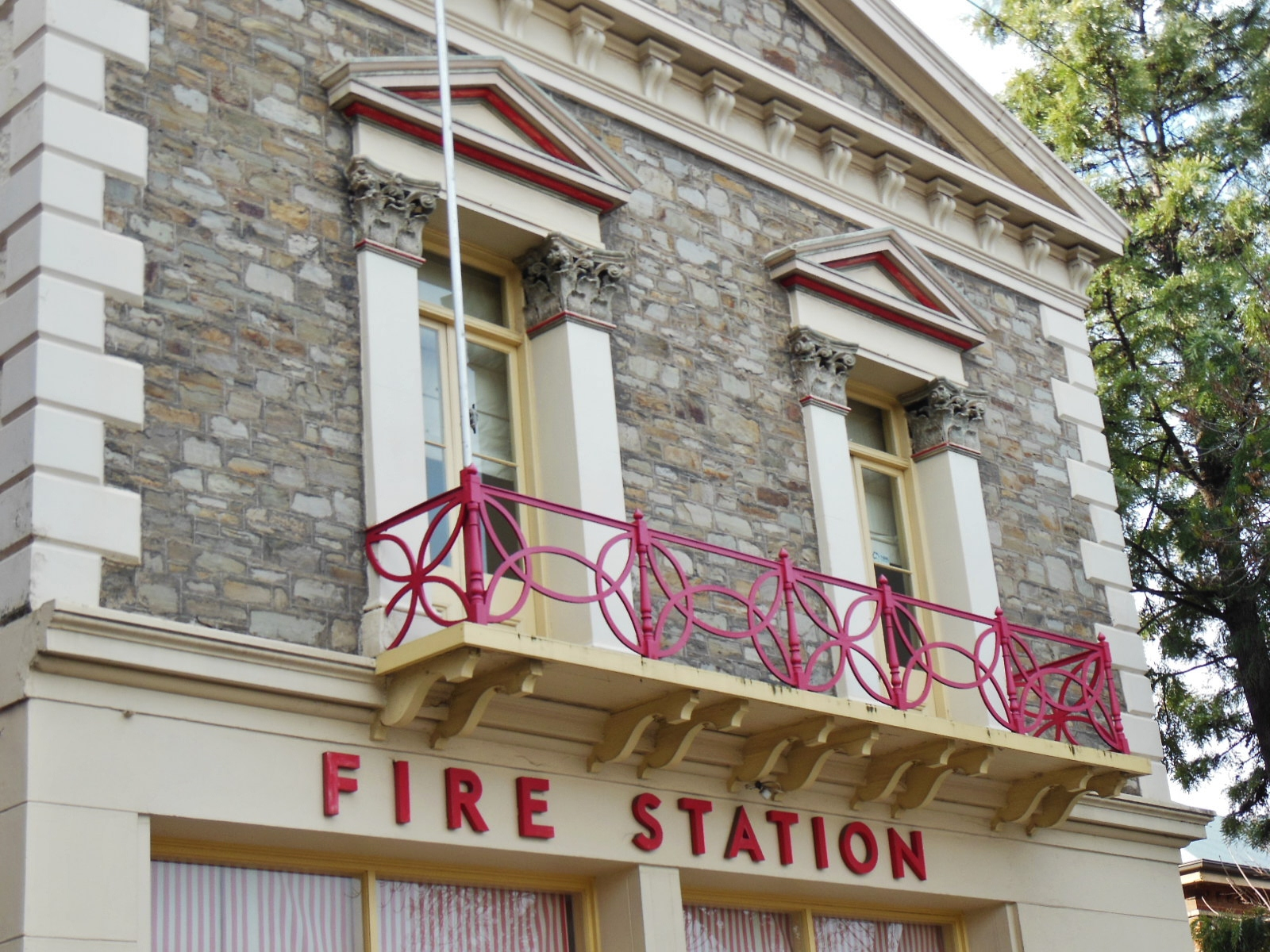

- Location within Australia
- 34.905491°S 138.597119°E
- Location: 82 Tynte Street, North Adelaide, South Australia

South Australian Heritage Register
- Designated: 11 September 1986
- Reference no.: 1435

The Fire Station Inn, also known as the North Adelaide Fire Station, at 82 Tynte Street, is a historic fire station building in North Adelaide, South Australia.

The North Adelaide Fire Brigade moved into new premises in O'Connell Street in 1895. The Tynte Street building was built as a shop in 1866 and renovated to serve as a fire station in 1904 replacing premises in O'Connell Street in 1905.

The Tynte Street building was listed as a State Heritage Place on the South Australian Heritage Register on 11 September 1986. As of 2018, it is used as tourist accommodation.
