= Sydney Packet (1826–1837) =

Coordinates: 45.358°S 170.853°E

History
- Owner: Alexander Brodie Spark (1826–c.1831); George Bunn (merchant) (1791-1834); John Jones (c.1831–)
- Launched: 1826
- Fate: Wrecked 1837

General characteristics
- Tonnage: 84 tons
- Sail plan: Schooner

Sydney Packet was a ship built in Sydney, New South Wales, Australia, in 1826 for Alexander Brodie Spark (1792–1856)

The ship was a two-masted schooner of 84 tons and the captain was James Bruce. After participating in the rescue of Elizabeth and Mary in 1831. In 1833 she was purchased by George Bunn to deliver cargo to Sydney from Bunn's Preservation Station in New Zealand. George Bunn suddenly died in August 1834. In 1835, Johnny Jones, a waterman of Sydney Cove in partnership with Edwin Palmer, bought Sydney Packet for 800 pounds, appointed Captain Bruce, fitted her out for bay whaling, and she sailed for Preservation. Bay. She was wrecked at Moeraki, Otago, 17 July 1837, a strong gale breaking her free from three anchors and driving her ashore.
