= Adelaide (shipwrecked 1850) =

British ship wrecked off coast of Spain

Mural monument by John Thomas (1813–1862) of Bristol, in Molland Church, Devon, erected by Capt. William Dovell, master and owner of the Adelaide, and sole survivor of the shipwreck in which his wife, born in Molland, and only son, drowned

The Adelaide was a British ship wrecked in a storm on 19 December 1850, off Laxe, 32 miles west of A Coruña, Spain, carrying 17 passengers and crew, bound for the West Indies. It is recorded as "Memorial M3147" on the "Maritime Memorials" database of the National Maritime Museum in Greenwich. An illustration of the plan of the ship is shown as folio 90 in Hilhouse Draughts, in 1950 in the possession of Charles Hill & Sons, shipbuilders at Bristol.

== Details ==
The ship was built in 1830 for owners James Cunningham and Henry Robley, merchants at Bristol. Her burthen was 28274/94 tons, and her measurements were: length 99' 6"; breadth (below) 25' 1"; height 5' 5 1/2". She had 2 decks and a raised quarterdeck, 3 masts, was ship rigged, with a square stern, quarter galleries, and bust head. The masters were Thomas Brooks, William Dovell on 25 October 1836, and Thomas Brooks again on 2 April 1844, at Tobago. On 28 June 1850, all shares in the ship were purchased by William Dovell, a master mariner. In 1850, it was described as having a "barque rig". On 13 November 1850, 21 shares were sold to Charles Hill, a merchant of Bristol.

== Shipwreck ==
The Shipwreck was recorded in the Bristol Mirror published on 4 January 1851. During a journey from Cardiff to St Vincent in the West Indies on the night of 15 September 1850, it was stranded during a hurricane off Laxe, 32 miles west of A Coruña, Spain. Of the 17 passengers and crew, the only survivor was Captain William Dovell, the owner and master. His wife and only son, who was aged 12, drowned along with 14 men.

== Molland Memorial ==
A source for the details of the shipwreck is a marble mural monument by John Thomas (1813–1862) of Bristol, erected by Captain William Dovell, sole survivor of the wreck, in the parish church of Molland in Devon, England, inscribed as follows:

This tablet is erected to the memory of Frances Dovell, aged 47 years, and William Quartly Dovell, aged 12 years (youngest daughter and grandson of the late Henry Quartly and Elizabeth his wife of this parish) the beloved wife and son of Capt^{n.} William Dovell of the Port of Bristol, who unfortunately perished by shipwreck on the night of the 19th Dec. 1850 on their voyage to the West Indies. The unfortunate occurrence took place at Lage near Corunna in Spain, when 16 persons, constituting with but one exception the whole crew and passengers of the ship "Adelaide", found a watery grave. Capt^{n.} Dovell, the bereaved survivor of this mournful event, who was most miraculously rescued, now a widower and childless, here records his enduring grief".

== William Dovell ==
Captain William Dovell was born in the parish of Parracombe in Devon on 30 October 1806. His wife Frances Quartly (1803–1850) was a daughter of Henry Quartly (1755–1840) (whose mural monument also exists within St Mary's Church in Molland). One of that family was famous for having established the breed of Devon Cattle at Great Champson and West Molland Barton during the period of the Napoleonic Wars, both within the parish of Molland, as tenants of the Throckmorton family. Ten years after the shipwreck, he remarried to a certain Mary. The Dovell family had been tenants in Molland since at least 1701, as the following deed dated 12 May 1701 is summarised:

Counterpart of lease for 99 years from John Courtenay of West Molland, Esq. to William Dovell alias Blackford of Molland, yeoman, of a messuage and lands called Ford in Molland.

Later Courtenay/Paston/Throckmorton Molland deeds in Warwickshire archives show the Dovell family as resident in High Bray (1734), West Anstey (1761), Dolworthy (sic, should be Holworthy) in the parish of Parracombe (1801), Martinhoe (1808) and Countisbury (1814), all in North Devon.
