= Adelaide (1832) =

Wooden cutter

Coordinates: 33.23°S 151.60°E

History

New South Wales
- Name: Adelaide
- Owner: Samuel Jones & Thomas Steel
- Port of registry: Sydney
- Ship registration number: 8/1832
- Builder: Unknown Illawarra, New South Wales, Australia
- Completed: 1832
- Fate: Wrecked May 1834

General characteristics
- Type: Wood cutter
- Tonnage: 29 GT
- Displacement: 29 NT
- Length: 11.58 m
- Beam: 4.419 m
- Draught: 1.853 m

Adelaide was a wooden cutter that was wrecked near Bird Island, Norah Head, New South Wales, in May 1834. She was carrying a load of timber.
