= SS Sud America I =

History

Italy
- Name: SS Sud America (1872-1884); SS Sud America I (1884-1888)
- Owner: Lavarello Fratelli Fu G. B., Genoa (1872-1883); Matteo Bruzzi & Co (1883-1884); La Veloce Linea di Navigazione Italiana a Vapore (1884-1888)
- Builder: Wigham Richardson, Newcastle upon Tyne
- Yard number: 82
- Launched: 12 June 1872
- Completed: October 1872
- Fate: Sunk in a collision on 13 September 1888

General characteristics
- Type: Ocean liner
- Tonnage: 2,246 GRT; 1,265 NRT
- Length: 314 feet (96 m)
- Beam: 35.3 feet (10.8 m)
- Depth: 28.8 feet (8.8 m)
- Installed power: 400 nhp
- Propulsion: Four masts; 1 × 2 cylinder compound engine; One propeller
- Speed: 12 knots (14 mph)
- Capacity: 75 first class passengers; 52 second class passengers; 750 immigrants
- Crew: 70

SS Sud America was an Italian ocean liner. She was built by Wigham Richardson, in Newcastle upon Tyne, England, and launched in 1872. She was operated by Lavarello Fratelli Fu G. B from 1872 until 1883. Her second owner was another Italian shipping company, La Veloce Navigazione Italiana a Vapore S. A., from 1884, who renamed her SS Sud America I.

== Sinking ==
On 13 September 1888, the ship was transporting from 260 passengers and 69 crew from Buenos Aires, Argentina, to Genoa, Italy, via Las Palmas, Gran Canaria in the Canary Islands. The ship was also carrying 700 tonnes of cargo. The ship was docked in the bay and the passengers were disembarking, while preparations were made for anchoring in order to load coal in the bay at Las Palmas. While this was being carried out, the French steamer La France collided with the bow of the Sud America I. The Sud America I sank almost instantly in 49 feet (15 m) of water, leaving only the tops of her four masts visible, 2,000 feet (610 m) from the beach. Seventy nine of the 329 passengers and crew died in the disaster.
