= Adelaide (shipwrecked 1837) =

Australian wooden cutter

History
- Name: Adelaide
- Status: historic shipwreck

General characteristics
- Type: Wood Cutter

Adelaide was a wooden cutter used in the cedar trade that was wrecked and lost off the Hawkesbury River in Broken Bay, New South Wales, in July 1837 while carrying a load of cedar. The wreck has not been located, but a vessel of its description was reported capsized between Cabbage Tree Bay and Bird Island at approximately 33.6°S 151.3°E.
