= HMAS Adelaide =

Three ships of the Royal Australian Navy have been named HMAS Adelaide, after Adelaide, the capital city of South Australia:

- HMAS Adelaide (1918) was a Town-class light cruiser commissioned in 1922 and decommissioned in 1946
- HMAS Adelaide (FFG 01) was an Adelaide-class frigate commissioned in 1980 and decommissioned in 2008
- HMAS Adelaide (L01) is a Canberra-class landing helicopter dock ship commissioned in 2015 and active as of 2022

== Battle honours ==
Ships of the name HMAS Adelaide have earned four battle honours:

- Pacific 1941–43
- East Indies 1942
- East Timor 1999
- Persian Gulf 2001–02
