= 1305 =

1305 in various calendars
Gregorian calendar	1305; MCCCV
Ab urbe condita	2058
Armenian calendar	754; ԹՎ ՉԾԴ
Assyrian calendar	6055
Balinese saka calendar	1226–1227
Bengali calendar	711–712
Berber calendar	2255
English Regnal year	33 Edw. 1 – 34 Edw. 1
Buddhist calendar	1849
Burmese calendar	667
Byzantine calendar	6813–6814
Chinese calendar	甲辰年 (Wood Dragon); 4002 or 3795 — to — 乙巳年 (Wood Snake); 4003 or 3796
Coptic calendar	1021–1022
Discordian calendar	2471
Ethiopian calendar	1297–1298
Hebrew calendar	5065–5066
- Hindu calendars
Vikram Samvat	1361–1362
Shaka Samvat	1226–1227
Kali Yuga	4405–4406
Holocene calendar	11305
Igbo calendar	305–306
Iranian calendar	683–684
Islamic calendar	704–705
Japanese calendar	Kagen 3 (嘉元３年)
Javanese calendar	1216–1217
Julian calendar	1305; MCCCV
Korean calendar	3638
Minguo calendar	607 before ROC 民前607年
Nanakshahi calendar	−163
Thai solar calendar	1847–1848
Tibetan calendar	阳木龙年 (male Wood-Dragon); 1431 or 1050 or 278 — to — 阴木蛇年 (female Wood-Snake); 1432 or 1051 or 279

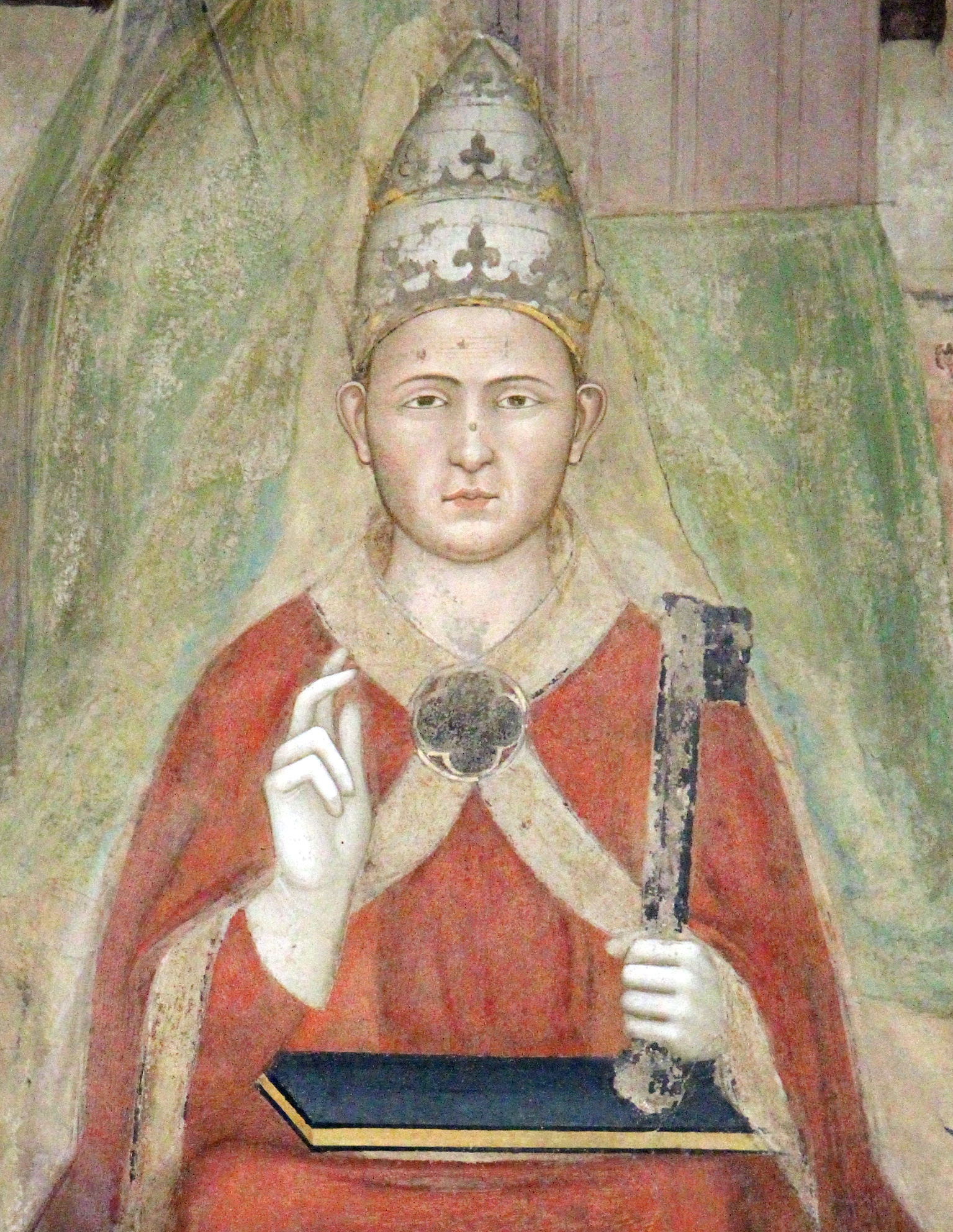
Pope Clement V (c. 1264–1314)

Year 1305 (MCCCV) was a common year starting on Monday of the Julian calendar.

== Events ==
=== January – March ===
- January 12 – The marriage of Bastam, the 8-year-old son (and eldest child) of the Ikhanate ruler of Iran, Oljaitu Khan, to Uljay Qutlugh Khatun, the 7-year-old daughter and the only surviving child of the previous Ikhanate, the late Ghazan Khan, takes place in Tabriz. The betrothal of the two children had been arranged by Ghazan and Öljaitü on September 17, 1303.
- January 16 – William de Hamilton is formally invested as Lord Chancellor, the highest-ranking elected official at the time in England.
- January 23 – Henry II Kőszegi, the Ban of Slavonia, completes his conquest of Croatian territory in Požega and Valkó, and issues a charter of annexation from his encampment at Valkószentgyörgy.
- February 26 – In Spain, King James II of Aragon and King Ferdinand IV of Castile have a summit at the Monastery of Santa María de Huerta in Castile. Attending also from Castile are Ferdinand's uncle, Prince John; Juan Núñez II de Lara of the House of Lara; Ferdinand's cousin Juan Manuel; and Prince Afonso of Portugal.
- February 28 – The 52nd English Parliament assembles.
- March 19 – Amir Chupan, the Duke of Yi, is betrothed to Dowlandi Khatun, the daughter of Öljaitü.
- March 20 – King Edward dissolves the 52nd Parliament.
- March 25 – Juan Manuel of Castile is made Lord of Alarcón.

=== April – June ===
- April 30 – Byzantine Emperor Michael IX Palaiologos invites Roger de Flor, Italian nobleman and adventurer, to Adrianople and has him assassinated there. Along with de Flor, 300 horsemen and some 1,000 foot soldiers who accompanied him are killed. The plan is executed by Alan mercenaries, who at that time are enlisted in the Byzantine army. The murder of the commander of the Catalan Company does not have the expected results. Not only is the Company not disbanded, but its attacks on Byzantine territory becomes more severe. The period of destruction in Macedonia and Thrace after the murder of de Flor becomes known as the "Catalan Revenge".
- May 19 – In Spain, the Treaty of Elche is signed between King James II of Aragon and King Ferdinand IV of Castile to revise the borders set out nine months earlier in the Treaty of Torrellas.
- June 5 – Pope Clement V, formerly the Archbishop of Bordeaux, succeeds Pope Benedict XI as the 195th pontiff of the Catholic Church. He will reign until 1314.
- June 20 – Öljaitü, the new Mongol Ikhanate, marries Qutlughshah Khatun, daughter of the Kerait Emir Irinjin.
- June 21 – At 14 years old, Wenceslaus III becomes ruler of Hungary, Bohemia, and Poland upon the death at age 33 of his father, King Wenceslaus II.
- June 27 – In recognition of the marriage of his daughter to Öljaitü the Mongol Ikhanate, Mongol Irinjin is appointed Viceroy of Anatolia.

=== July – September ===
- July 10 – Battle of Apros: Byzantine forces (some 6,000 men) under Michael IX Palaiologos, consisting of a large contingent of Alans and Turcopoles (Christianized Turks), attack the Catalan Company near Apros. Michael orders a general cavalry charge, but the Turcopoles desert en bloc to the Catalans. During the battle, the Byzantines are defeated (with many losses from the crossbowmen) and Michael is injured but escapes the field.
- July 15 – King Edward of England summons a new Parliament, to assemble on September 15.
- August 3 – William Wallace, Scottish rebel leader and knight, is captured near Glasgow at Robroyston, by English troops led by John de Menteith. He is transported to London and led, crowned mockingly with laurel, in procession to Westminster Hall.
- August 23 – After a three-week trial at Westminster, William Wallace is convicted of treason and of atrocities against civilians in war. After the trial, he is dragged through the streets of Smithfield in London and hanged, drawn and quartered – strangled by hanging – but cut down while still alive, emasculated, disemboweled (with his bowels burned before him), beheaded, and then cut into four parts. Wallace's head is placed on a spike above the London Bridge, and his limbs are displayed separately, in Newcastle, Berwick, Stirling, and Perth.
- September 15 – King Edward I of England issues ordinances for the government of the Kingdom of Scotland. King Edward issues the first commission of Trailbaston – which empowers him to appoint judicial commissions to punish crimes (such as homicide, theft, arson, and rape) and certain trespasses. Edward adds also conspiracy to the list of presentments.
- September 19 – At Tabriz (now in Iran) Öljaitü the Mongol Ikhanate, receives the Mongol ambassador from Yuan dynasty China.

=== October – December ===
- October 9 – King Wenceslaus III marries Viola Elizabeth of Teschen, daughter of Duke Mieszko I, and abandons his claim to Hungary in favor of Otto III of Bavaria. Meanwhile, Wladyslaw II the Elbow-High, claimant to the Polish throne, begins conquering Polish territories.
- November 24 – In India, Mahalakadeva, King of Malwa, is killed while attempting to flee the invaders from the Delhi Sultanate. Ayn al-Mulk Multani takes control of the kingdom as the Sultanate's Governor of Malwa.
- December 8 – At Tabriz, the Mongol Ikhanate Öljaitü receives the ambassador sent by Toqta, Khan of the Golden Horde that rules territory comprising much of what is now Russia.
- December 20 – Battle of Amroha: Mongol forces (some 30,000 men) invade the Delhi Sultanate again in northern India. Sultan Alauddin Khalji dispatches a cavalry force led by Vizier Ghazi Malik, to repulse the Mongols. During the battle (somewhere in the Amroha district), the Delhi forces inflict a crushing defeat upon the invaders. Many Mongols are taken prisoner and incorporated into the Delhi army.

== Births ==
- June 2 – Abu Sa'id Bahadur (or "Abu Sa'id"), Mongol ruler (d. 1335)
- August 18 – Ashikaga Takauji, Japanese general (shogun) (d. 1358)
- September 25 – Al-Mahdi Ali, Yemeni imam and politician (d. 1372)
- September 29 – Henry XIV, German nobleman and co-ruler (d. 1339)
- October 28 – Minbyauk Thihapate, Burmese ruler of Sagaing (d. 1364)
- November 5 – Robert Clifford, English nobleman and knight (d. 1344)
- Agnes of Bohemia, Bohemian princess (House of Přemyslid) (d. 1337)
- Arnoul d'Audrehem, French nobleman, knight and marshal (d. 1370)
- Elizabeth of Poland, queen consort of Hungary and Croatia (d. 1380)
- Gao Ming (or "Gao Zecheng"), Chinese poet and playwright (d. 1370)
- Isabella of Aragon (or "Elisabeth"), German queen consort (d. 1330)
- Khatsun Namkha Lekpa Gyaltsen, Tibetan religious leader (d. 1343)
- Konoe Mototsugu, Japanese nobleman (kugyō) and regent (d. 1354)
- Louis the Junker, German nobleman, knight and co-ruler (d. 1345)
- Peter of Aragon, Spanish prince (infante) and counsellor (d. 1381)
- Peter Thomas, French monk, archbishop and theologian (d. 1366)
- Philippe de Cabassoles, French bishop and papal legate (d. 1372)
- Shiba Takatsune, Japanese general and warlord (daimyo) (d. 1367)
- Thomas of Frignano, Italian cardinal and Minister General (d. 1381)
- Yi Ja-heung, Korean nobleman, official and Grand Prince (d. 1371)

== Deaths ==
- January 17 – Roger of Lauria, Italian nobleman and admiral (b. 1245)
- March 1 – Blanche of France, French princess and duchess (b. 1278)
- March 7 – Guy of Dampierre, French nobleman and knight (b. 1226)
- April 2 – Joan I of Navarre, French queen consort and regent (b. 1273)
- April 10 – Joachim Piccolomini, Italian monk and altar server (b. 1258)
- April 30 – Roger de Flor, Italian nobleman and adventurer (b. 1267)
- May 17 – Hōjō Tokimura, Japanese nobleman (rensho) (b. 1242)
- June 21 – Wenceslaus II, king of Bohemia and Poland (b. 1271)
- August 23 – William Wallace, Scottish rebel leader and knight
- August 26 – Walter of Winterburn, English cardinal and writer
- September 4 – Matteo Rosso Orsini, Italian cardinal (b. 1230)
- September 10 – Nicholas of Tolentino, Italian friar and mystic
- October 4
  - Dietrich VII, German nobleman and knight (b. 1256)
  - Kameyama, Japanese emperor and priest (b. 1249)
- October 9 – Robert de Pontigny, French abbot and cardinal
- November 11 – Otto I, German nobleman and knight (b. 1262)
- November 16 – Albertino Morosini, Venetian nobleman and governor
- November 18 – John II, French nobleman and knight (b. 1239)
- November 24 – Mahalakadeva, ruler of India's Malwa Kingdom (killed in battle)
- Guillaume de Villaret, French knight and Grand Master (b. 1235)
- John I, Piedmontese nobleman (House of Aleramici) (b. 1275)
- John II van Sierck (or "Zyrick"), Dutch archdeacon and bishop
- Qian Xuan (or "Shun Ju"), Chinese official and painter (b. 1235)
