= Catalan campaign in Asia Minor =

1303–07 Byzantine mercenary-led military campaign

Catalan Campaign in Asia Minor
Date	1303 to c. 1307
Location	Asia Minor (modern-day Turkey)
Result	Byzantine victory

Belligerents
Byzantine Empire; Catalan Company (until 1305)	Various Anatolian Turkish Beyliks; Catalan Company (after 1305)

Commanders and leaders
(Byzantine Empire) Andronikos II Palaiologos (Byzantine Empire) Michael IX Palaiologos (Byzantine Empire) Hranislav; Roger de Flor (before 1305)	Roger de Flor X (1305); Berenguer d'Entença

Strength
Total: 10,900; see §Strength of forces	30,000 men, according to Ramon Muntaner

Casualties and losses
Only about 1,500 Catalans remained, according to Ramon Muntaner	18,000 supposedly lay dead, according to Ramon Muntaner

In 1303, the Byzantine Emperor Andronicus II Palaeologus hired 6,500 Catalan mercenaries under Roger de Flor to campaign against the Turks in the spring and summer of the same year. Their costly service came with success, driving back the Turks in parts of Asia Minor. At Aulax, during the First Siege of Philadelphia, 18,500 Turkish soldiers were left dead or captured by the Catalans.

However, the Byzantines got more than what they bargained for; the mercenaries were difficult to restrain and consequently much of the reconquered territory was laid to waste. When their leader Roger de Flor was assassinated in Gallipoli on 3 April 1305 by Michael IX Palaeologus followed by a massacre of 1,300 Catalans, the mercenaries began a two-year pillage in revenge and crossed over to Thrace and Macedonia under the command of their new leader, Berenguer d'Entença, where further raiding occurred. As a result of this brutality, the Company was excommunicated by Pope Clement V. Eventually the Catalan mercenaries claimed the Duchy of Athens for themselves in 1311 and would remain there until 1379, leaving behind a devastated Byzantium. After this, the Turks found much support amongst those who suffered and reoccupied land that had been lost.

Thus, the Catalans' campaign was a short-term Byzantine victory, but benefited the Turks in the long term.

== Strength of forces ==
Initially the Catalan Company, from Aragon, arrived in Constantinople in 1303 with 39 ships and 6,500 men, which consisted of 1,500 horsemen, 4,000 Almogavars and 1,000 footsoldiers, most of whom were Aragonese, Catalans and Valencians from the Crown of Aragon. These forces were later reinforced by 300 horsemen and 1,000 Almogavars and later, they were joined by 300 horsemen and Berenguer d'Entença. After the murder of Roger de Flor the Byzantines killed so many of the Company that only 3,307 men remained. These numbers were further reduced to 206 horseman and 1,256 after an encounter with Genoese forces, according to Muntaner. Before leaving Gallipoli the company was joined by a Turkish force consisting of 800 horseman and 2,000 footsoldiers.

Ramon Muntaner who was a soldier from Catalonia and chronicler, wrote that during a battle in 1304 the Company fought against nearly 30,000 Turks (10,000 cavalry and 20,000 infantry) of which 18,000 (6,000 cavalry and 12,000 infantry) supposedly lay dead.

== See also ==
- George Pachymeres – Byzantine historian and philosopher (1242 – c. 1310)
- Great Catalan Company
- Ramon Muntaner
- Chronicle of Muntaner
- History of the sword

== Bibliography ==
- Georg Ostrogorsky, Storia dell'Impero bizantino, Milano, Einaudi, 1968, ISBN 88-06-17362-6.
- John Julius Norwich, Bisanzio, Milano, Arnoldo Mondadori Editore, 2000, ISBN 88-04-48185-4.
- Alain Ducellier, Michel Kapla, Bisanzio (IV-XV secolo), Milano, San Paolo, 2005, ISBN 88-215-5366-3.
- A History of the Crusades: Volume III — The Fourteenth and Fifteenth Centuries, ed. Harry W. Hazard, University of Wisconsin Press: Madison, 1975.
- Setton, Kenneth M. Catalan Domination of Athens 1311–1380. Revised edition. Variorum: London, 1975.
- Jacques Heers, Chute et mort de Constantinople, 1204-1453, éditions Perrin ISBN 2-262-02098-1
- Donald M. Nicol, Les Derniers siècles de Byzance, 1261-1453, éditions Les Belles Lettres ISBN 2-251-38074-4
