= Battle of Apros =

1305 battle in Thrace

Coordinates: 40°58′02″N 27°31′14″E

- Part of Byzantine–Catalan conflicts
Date	July 1305
Location	Apros, Thrace
Result	Catalan victory

Belligerents
Byzantine Empire	Catalan Company

Commanders and leaders
Michael IX	Berenguer de Rocafort

Strength
c. 6,000	c. 2,500

Casualties and losses
Heavy	Light

The Battle of Apros took place in July 1305 in Thrace, when the Byzantine co-emperor Michael IX Palaiologos confronted the Catalan Company, a mercenary force that had recently turned against the empire. Hired a few years earlier to reinforce the eastern frontier, the Company had become increasingly difficult to control and entered into open conflict with the Byzantines after the murder of its leader Roger de Flor.

Michael IX assembled the main imperial field army in an effort to bring the Company to battle, but the confrontation near Apros in Thrace ended in a decisive Catalan victory. The collapse of key Byzantine auxiliary troops at the outset left the imperial centre exposed, and the army broke under pressure. The defeat effectively ended the empire’s ability to challenge the Company. In its aftermath, the Catalans and their Turkish allies ranged freely through Thrace before moving west into Macedonia and Thessaly, eventually establishing control over the Duchy of Athens.

== Background ==
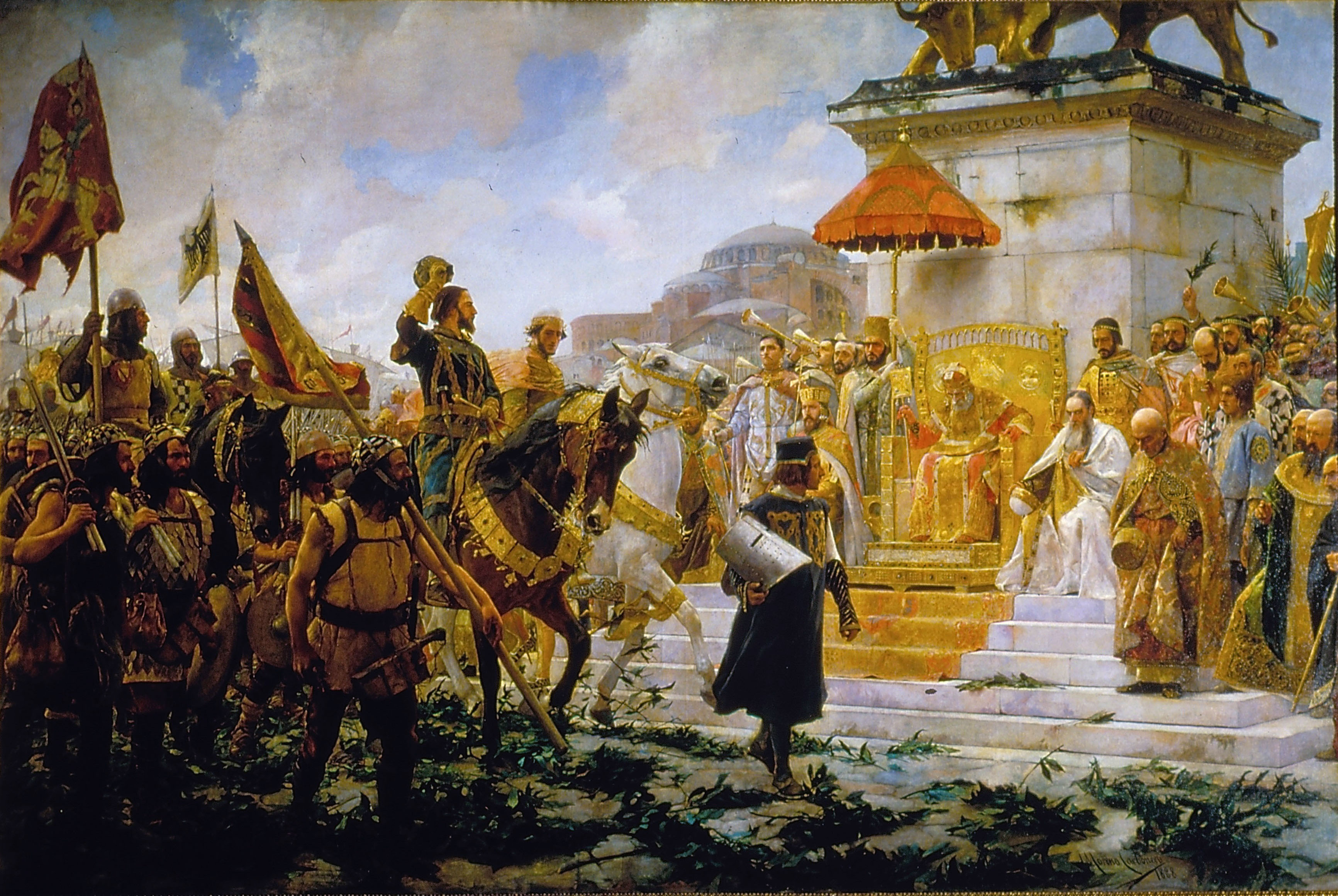
Roger de Flor entering Constantinople before Emperor Andronikos II (1303).

By the early fourteenth century the Byzantine Empire was struggling to contain the rise of Serbia under Stefan Milutin and to contain Turkish expansion in Asia Minor. With limited resources and repeated defeats on the eastern frontier, the government of Andronikos II Palaiologos increasingly relied on foreign mercenaries for support.

Among these were the Catalan Company, a band of professional soldiers led by the former Templar Roger de Flor. (Note: De Flor had been expelled from the Order of the Knights Templar for embezzlement and misconduct before turning to piracy and forming his own company of knights.) Andronikos II hired them on generous terms, hoping they could stabilise the frontier. Their early campaigns relieved several besieged cities, driving the Turks from Kyzikos during the Battle of the Cyzicus, and even challenging Osman’s emirate in 1304. Soon the Catalans began to plunder Asia Minor, quarrel with the Genoese of Galata and clash with the Alan mercenaries. By early 1305 the Catalans were in control of the Gallipoli peninsula, operating independently of imperial authority. Tensions escalated in April 1305 when Roger de Flor was stabbed by an Alan leader in Michael IX’s camp at Adrianople. He died alongside the three hundred men accompanying him in the ensuing massacre. The Catalans swore revenge for their leader’s murder and entered into open war with the empire.

== Prelude ==
Michael IX Palaiologos, son and co-emperor of Andronikos II, decided to strike the Company before it could consolidate its position. A first expedition was repulsed and the Catalans continued to hold Gallipoli while raiding surrounding regions. Michael IX then gathered the main Byzantine field army, supported by Alan mercenary contingents with the goal of forcing a decisive confrontation. The Catalans, determined to avenge Roger's killing and assert their independence, prepared to meet the imperial force, electing in Gallipoli Berenguer de Rocafort as their new commander. Rocafort strengthened their force by bringing in Turkish mercenaries from across the Hellespont (Dardanelles). The two sides moved toward Thrace.

== Battle ==
In July 1305 the Catalan Company and the Byzantine army met near Apros in Thrace. The imperial forces, commanded by Michael IX, were considerably larger and included Alan and Tourkopouloi contingents on the flanks under Bulgarian commander Vojisil. The Catalan army flew the banners of the kingdoms of Sicily and Crown of Aragon.

When the fighting began, the Alan cavalry on the Byzantine left withdrew almost immediately, disrupting the cohesion of the imperial line. Their departure was followed by the desertion of the Tourkopouloi, who passed over to the Catalans together with the Turks already serving alongside them. The Catalan charge broke the Byzantine line, and the rout became complete despite Emperor Michael’s attempt to rally the reserve, during which he was unhorsed and carried from the field by his guards. Contemporary figures cited by medieval historian Mark C. Bartusis describe the Catalan force as much smaller than Michael IX's army, yet the numerical advantage of the Byzantines did not prevent a decisive defeat.

According to military scholars Nikolaos Kanellopoulos and Ioanna Lekea, it is very likely that the Byzantine cavalry was defeated by the Catalan infantry. Byzantinist Donald Nicol notes that Michael IX nearly lost all his army and barely escaped with his own life. The engagement ended in a clear Catalan victory. After looting the imperial camp, the Catalans withdrew to Gallipoli to secure their plunder.

== Aftermath ==
The victory at Apros gave the Catalans control of the open country along the Thracian shore of the Propontis. After the battle, the Catalans, together with their Turkish allies and the defected Tourkopouloi, advanced across Thrace. In the months that followed, the Company moved aggressively against imperial auxiliaries. At the foot of the Balkan Mountains, the Alan contingents that had entered Byzantium in 1301 were overtaken and annihilated by a pursuing Catalan force.

They exacted harsh revenge on Rhaidestos, massacring the population in retaliation for the killing of their envoys, and subsequently made the town, a site closer to Constantinople, their new base instead of Gallipoli. From there they spent more than two years raiding the surrounding region. As a last resort, the Emperor ordered that all the country between Selymbria and Constantinople should be evacuated and the crops destroyed. The Catalans began a westward movement into Macedonia and Thessaly, ultimately conquering the Latin Duchy of Athens in 1311.
