= Roger de Flor (opera) =

Opera by Ruperto Chapí (1878)

- Opera by Ruperto Chapí
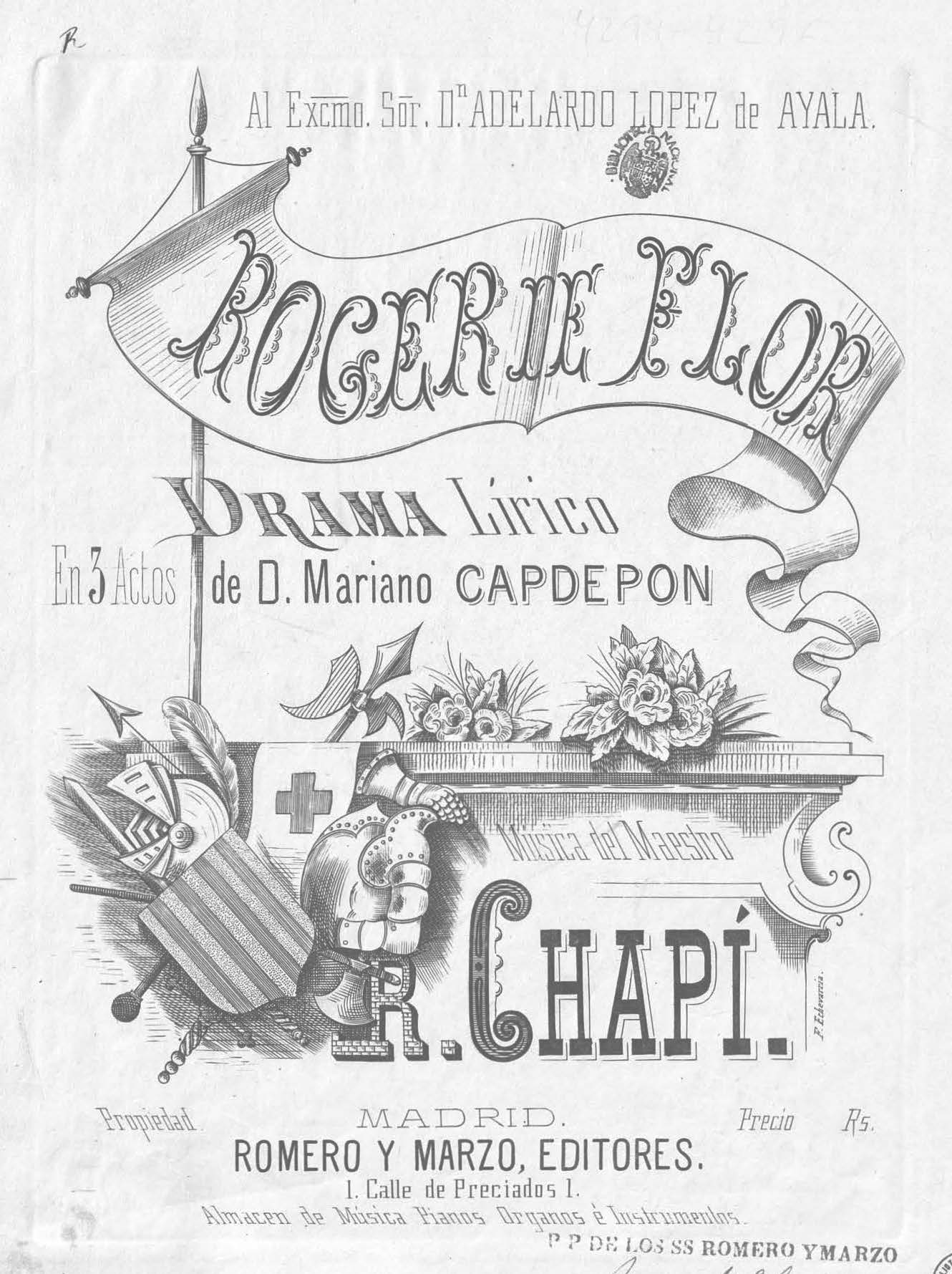
- Cover of the vocal score, c. 1879
- Librettist: Mariano Capdepón
- Language: Spanish
- Premiere: 23 January 1878 (incomplete); Teatro Real, Madrid

Roger de Flor is an opera (drama lírico) in three acts by Ruperto Chapí for libretto by Mariano Capdepón. It is the third of the three operas composed by Chapí during his studies in Paris and Italy. It was staged for the first time at the Teatro Real in Madrid on 23 January 1878. The first modern performance was on 10 March 2012 in Palau de la Música de València in a concert performance.

== Background and performance history ==
Before Roger de Flor, only seven works by Spanish composers were staged at the Teatro Real, two of which were 1-act operas by Chapí. The new composition was presented during the wedding fests of Alfonso XII and Mercedes of Orléans. The first performance took place on the very day of the wedding, but was incomplete (only two acts). It had to correspond to the time of the wedding ceremony, and there were also artistical problems. The first complete performance took place some days later, on 22 February, the anniversary of the First Spanish Republic, conducted by the composer, and the opera was staged for 4 nights. It was sung in Italian translation by Ernesto Palermi.

Although the vocal score of the opera was published shortly after its premiere, the full score remained in the manuscript (this was actually the normal publication practice in Spain by that time). When modern musicians turned to Roger de Flor having the goal of a new performance, they found out that about a half of the first act was lost. The incomplete version was supposed to be performed on 8 or 9 October 2009, linked to the celebrations of the Valencian National Day (9 October) and to the centenary of Chapí's death. However, the revival of the opera was disturbed with the Valencian national issues. The organizer of the project, Valencian Palau de la Música, proposed to change the Catalan in the text to the Valencians or Aragonese. This led to objections from musicians and the heirs of Chapí. Incapable to find a solution immediately, the Palau canceled the intended performance.

Meanwhile, the lost portions of the work were reconstructed from the vocal score by musicologist Emilio Casares Rodicio, who prepared a critical edition of the score. The opera had a concert performance on 10 March 2012, with Miguel Ángel Gómez Martínez conducting.

== Roles ==
Role	Voice type	Premiere cast, 11 February 1878	Modern premiere cast, 10 March 2012
María, Princess of Bulgary, wife of Roger de Flor	soprano	Erminia Borghi-Mamo	Ana María Sánchez
Irene		Flores	
Roger de Flor	tenor	Enrico Tamberlik	Javier Palacios
Basila, commander of the turcopoles	baritone	Mariano Padilla y Ramos	José Antonio López
Michael Palaiologos, Emperor of Greece	bass	Romano Nannetti	Stefano Palatchi
Andronikos, Emperor, father of Michael		Ugalde	
Nicephorus		Santos	

== Synopsis ==
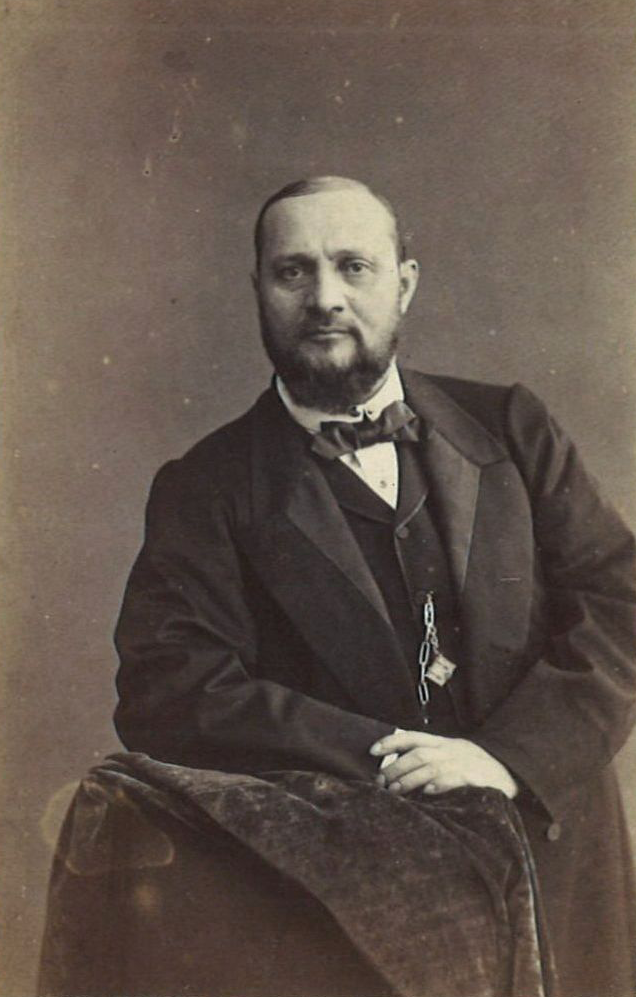
Enrico Tamberlick, first performer of the title role

The opera deals with the story of the Catalan Company led to the Byzantine Empire by Roger de Flor. The action is set in Constantinople, Gallipoli and Adrianople in the first years of the 14th century. It presents Roger's power at the Byzantine court and his subsequent assassination.

== Music ==
The music of the opera shows a great influence of Meyerbeer, but also with some traits of Wagnerian style. The rich instrumentation of the overture should have been new to the Madrid audience of the period. María's aria of the second act has some Verdian moments, and the Finale of the same act is laid in the style of Meyerbeerian grand opera. The influence of the latter is also perceptible in the third act duo of María and Roger, in which Italian delicacy is mixed with some vocal writing reminding the Lohengrin.

== Recordings ==
- (rec. 2007) Ruperto Chapí: Obra sinfónica [Symphony; Overture to Roger de Flor; Combate de Don Quijote contra las Ovejas] — Orquestra de l'Acadèmia del GranTeatre del Liceu, Guerassim Voronkov — Columna Música B-20442-2007
