= Ferran d'Aunés =

14th-century Catalan mercenary and Byzantine admiral

- Other name: Fernando d'Ahonés
- Military career
- Allegiance: Catalan Company; Byzantine Empire

Ferran d'Aunés or Fernando d'Ahonés (Greek: Φαρεντζανέζας, Pharentzanezas) was a Catalan mercenary of the Catalan Company who entered Byzantine service.

Ferran arrived in Constantinople with the mercenary Catalan Company in September 1303. The Company's commander, Roger de Flor, was named megas doux, head of the entire Byzantine fleet. Roger in turn secured Ferran's appointment by the Byzantine emperor Andronikos II Palaiologos as an admiral—with the borrowed title amirales, used for the first time in official Byzantine titulature—in charge of the Catalan fleet of some 12 ships. At the same time, Ferran married into the Byzantine nobility. He kept this post until May 1305, when he was discovered while trying to smuggle over fifty Catalans out of Constantinople aboard his galley and imprisoned. In the subsequent pogrom against the Catalans, the house of his father-in-law, Pachys Raoul, was torched by the mob. Nevertheless Ferran was released and named Domestic of the Schools by Emperor Andronikos. He remained in the post until 1305/6, when he took part in the failed conspiracy of John Drimys. Nothing further is known of him. His brother, whose first name is unknown, defected with fifty of his men to the Byzantines in 1306/7 and was honoured by the Emperor.
