= Aprus (Thrace) =

Town of ancient Thrace

Coordinates: 40°55′37″N 27°06′26″E

Aprus or Apros (Ancient Greek: Ἄπρος), also Apri or Aproi (Ἄπροι), was a town of ancient Thrace and, later, a Roman city established in the Roman province of Europa.

== History ==
Stephanus of Byzantium collects a quote of Theopompus that mentions Aprus. Pliny the Elder notes that Aprus is situated in the interior of Thrace, 22 M.P. from Resisto (likely the same as Bisanthe), 50 Roman miles from Bizya and 180 Roman miles from Philippi.

The city was re-founded as Colonia Claudia Aprensis in the mid-1st century AD, probably in connection with the emperor Claudius's annexation of Thracia, and was intended for retired members of the Roman military. It was situated on the Via Egnatia that ran from the Adriatic coast in the province of Illyricum to Byzantium, the city that was to become Constantinople.

In the 4th century, Aprus was the principal city of the region southwest of Heraclea, the capital of the province.

The city was called Theodosiopolis (Greek: Θεοδοσιούπολις) in documents of the 6th century, in honour of Theodosius II, emperor from 401 to 450, or of Theodosius I (347–395).

After the capture of Constantinople during the Fourth Crusade (1204), the Henry of Flanders, brother of Baldwin I, attacked the city and killed many of the citizens. The Latin Empire made Theodore Branas (called Li Vernas by Geoffroi de Villehardouin) lord of Aprus. In 1206, Tsar Kaloyan of Bulgaria destroyed the city, but Branas rebuilt it.

In the Battle of Apros of July 1305, the Catalan Company annihilated the Byzantine imperial army under Michael IX Palaiologos.

== Site ==
Its location is near the modern Turkish village of Kermeyan.

== Name ==
The Romans named the town Colonia Claudia Aprensis, and the Byzantines called it Apros and latter Theodosiopolis.

== Ecclesiastical history ==
The former archbishopric was a double Catholic titular archbishopric - under the name Theodosiopolis ante Apri it was the only Bulgarian Catholic titular see, but has been suppressed as such, yet it remains a Latin titular see as Aprus.

=== Archbishopric ===
In a Notitia Episcopatuum of about 640, the bishopric appears as an autocephalous archdiocese and as the 22nd in order of precedence among 34 sees dependent upon the Patriarchate of Constantinople. Perhaps due to error, it is missing from the next such document, composed at the start of the 10th century, but reappears in the middle of the same century. In the 15th century it was dropped from the official lists of the dioceses dependent on the Patriarchate of Constantinople.

No longer a residential diocese, it has been listed by the Catholic Church as a double titular see, but remains only Latin

=== Latin titular see ===
No later than 1848, the diocese was nominally restored as a Latin Episcopal as Titular bishopric under the names of Theodosiopolis (Latin) / Teodosiopoli (Curiate Italian) / Apri / Apros / Aprus.

It was repeatedly renamed : in 1926 as Titular Episcopal See of Theodosiopolis (Latin) / Teodosiopoli d’Europa (Italian) / Apri / Apros / Aprus; in 1929 as Titular Episcopal See of Theodosiopolis (Latin) / Teodosiopoli di Frigia (Italian) and in 1930 as Titular Episcopal See of Theodosiopolis (Latin) / Teodosiopoli d’Europa (Italian) / Apri / Apros / Aprus.

In 1931 it was suppressed, having had the following incumbents, however none of the then fitting Episcopal (lowest) rank, all of the higher (and present) Archiepiscopal (intermediary) rank:

- Antonius Merciai, Dominican Order (O.P.) (?Italian?) (1848.12.11 – death 1850.10.22), no prelature
- Giovanni Tommaso Neuschel (1852.09.17 – death 1863.12.10) (born Italy) as emeritate and promoted for the former Titular Bishop of Troas (1828 – 1828.09.30), Bishop of Guastalla (Italy) (1828.09.30 – 1836.11.21), Bishop of Borgo San Donnino (Italy) (1836.11.21 – 1843.01.27), Bishop of Parma (Italy) (1843.01.27 – retired 1852.09.17)
- Henri-Marie Amanton, O.P. (born France) (1865.03.11 – death 1869.10.12) as emeritate and promotion for the papal diplomat, former Titular Bishop of Arcadiopolis (1857.03.10 – 1865.03.11) as Apostolic Delegate to Mesopotamia, Kurdistan and Lesser Armenia (1857.03.10 – 1865.03.27)
- Josyf Sembratovyc (1882.12.22 – death 1900.10.23) as emeritate, previously Titular Archbishop of Nazianzus (1865.03.24 – 1870.06.27) as Apostolic Administrator of Przemyśl of the Ukrainians (Poland) (1867.10.01 – 1870.06.27), Metropolitan of Lviv of the Ukrainians (Ukraine) (1870.06.27 – 1882.11.11)
- Pietro Maglione (1900.12.17 – death 1903.04.13) (born Italy), as emeritate and promotion, previously Bishop of Cariati (Italy) (1874.06.15 – 1876.12.18), Bishop of Capaccio–Vallo (Italy) (1876.12.18 – 1900.12.17)
- Nicola Marconi, Friars Minor O.F.M. (1911.01.21 – death 1930.04.11) (born Italy) as emeritate and promotion for the former Bishop of Pult (Albania) (1890.12.23 – 1911.01.21).

In 1933 however, it was restored, renamed and promoted as Titular archbishopric of Aprus (Latin) / Apro (Italian) / Apren(sis) (Latin adjective).

It has been vacant for several decades, having had the following incumbents, so far of the now fitting Archiepiscopal (intermediary) rank;

- Giuseppe Lojacono (1939.06.01 – death 1945.03.13) (born Italy) as emeritate and promotion for the former Bishop of Ariano (Italy) (1918.11.04 – 1939.06.01)
- Ercolano Marini (1945.10.03 – 1945.10.27) (born Italy) as emeritate, previously Titular Bishop of Archelaïs (1904.06.29 – 1905.12.11) as Auxiliary Bishop of Spoleto (Italy) (1904.06.29 – 1905.12.11), Bishop of Roman Catholic Diocese of Norcia (Italy) (1905.12.11 – 1915.06.02), Archbishop of Amalfi (Italy) (1915.06.02 – 1945.10.27); however quickly 'transferred' Titular Archbishop of Adana (1945.10.27 – 1950.11.16)
- Arthur Hughes, White Fathers (M. Afr.) (born England, UK) (1947.08.23 – death 1949.07.12) as papal diplomat : Apostolic Internuncio to Egypt (1947.08.23 – 1949.07.12); previously (honorary) Titular Bishop of Hieropolis (1945.03.03 – 1947.08.23)
- Philip Francis Pocock (1951.08.06 – 1952.01.14) (born Canada) as Coadjutor Archbishop of Winnipeg (Canada) (1951.08.06 – 1952.01.14); later succeeding as Archbishop of Winnipeg (1952.01.14 – 1961.02.18), Titular Archbishop of Isauropolis (1961.02.18 – 1971.03.30) as Coadjutor Archbishop of Toronto (Ontario, Canada) (1961.02.18 – 1971.03.30) succeeding as Metropolitan Archbishop of Toronto (Canada) (1971.03.30 – 1978.04.29); previously Bishop of Saskatoon (Canada) (1944.04.07 – 1951.08.06)
- Antonio Gregorio Vuccino, Assumptionists (A.A.) (?Italian?) (1952.07.06 – 1968.04.23) as emeritate, previously Bishop of Syros (insular Greece) (1937.06.09 – 1947.05.29), Metropolitan Archbishop of Corfu–Zakynthos–Kefalonia (insular Greece) (1947.05.29 – 1952.07.06).

=== Bulgarian Catholic titular see ===
No later than 1907, it was also and separately restored as the only-ever titular see of the particular Bulgarian Byzantine Catholic Church (Bulgarian Catholics of the Byzantine Rite) as Titular archbishopric of Theodosiopolis ante Apri (Latin) / Teodosiopoli (Curiate Italian).

In 1924 it was suppressed, having had a single incumbent of the fitting Archiepiscopal (intermediary) rank :

- Michail Miroff (1907.01.08 – death 1923), no actual prelature.

== Sources ==
- Külzer, Andreas (2008). Tabula Imperii Byzantini: Band 12, Ostthrakien (Eurōpē) (in German). Vienna: Österreichische Akademie der Wissenschaften. pp. 255–259. ISBN 978-3-7001-3945-4.
- GCatholic - Latin titular see
- GCatholic - former Bulgarian Catholic titular see
