= Bernat de Rocafort =

14th-century mercenary commander (1271-1309)

- Born: Bernat de Rocafort; 1271
- Died: 1309 (aged 37–38); Aversa, Campania
- Other name: Berenguer de Rocafort
- Military career
- Service years: c. 1303–1309
- Unit: Catalan Company
- Commands: Leader (1307–1309)
- Known for: Leadership of the Catalan Company (Note: Sources disagree on whether he succeeded Roger de Flor directly or after Berenguer d'Entença.)

Bernat de Rocafort (also known as Berenguer (Note: Also known as Bernard, and Béranger) de Rocafort; 1271–1309) was a mercenary commander and the third leader of the Catalan Company during its campaigns in the Eastern Mediterranean.

Initially a vassal of Frederick III of Sicily in Calabria, he joined the Company around 1303 and rose to prominence after the assassination of its commander, Roger de Flor. Elected leader in 1305, Rocafort consolidated control over the Company, recruited Turkish mercenaries, and directed its operations across Thrace and Macedonia. Accounts of Rocafort's final actions differ. Historian Donald Nicol records that he lost the confidence of his men and was replaced, while other sources state that he was arrested in 1309, handed to Robert I of Naples, and died in prison at Aversa.

== Life ==
=== Early career ===
Movements of the Catalan Company in Asia Minor, 1303–1304, shortly after Rocafort joined.

Bernat de Rocafort was born in 1271. He first served as a vassal of Frederick III of Sicily in Calabria, where he held several castles. The Peace of Caltabellotta (1302), which ended the war between Frederick and the Angevin rulers of Naples, required these castles to be transferred to the Angevins. Rocafort refused to surrender them without compensation, bringing him into conflict with King Robert I of Naples.

By 1303, Rocafort was operating in the Eastern Mediterranean. According to Catalan sources, he brought about 1,000 almogàvers and 1,200 cavalry in two galleys and joined the Catalan Company, a mercenary force recruited mainly from Catalan and Aragonese soldiers. At the time the Company was serving the Byzantine Empire against Turkish advances in western Asia Minor. Appointed seneschal by its leader Roger de Flor, Rocafort took part in the Company’s campaigns in the region.

=== Leadership of the Catalan Company ===
Following Roger de Flor's assassination in April 1305, sources differ on the succession. Historian Clifford J. Rogers states, the Catalans elected Berenguer d'Entença as leader, while Timothy Venning and Peter Frankopan record that Rocafort was chosen at Gallipoli. William Miller notes that after Entença was captured by a Genoese fleet, the Catalans elected Rocafort as his successor, assisted by a council of twelve. Rocafort is regarded as the third leader of the Company.

Rocafort's early measures aimed to assert independence from Byzantine authority. He strengthened his position by recruiting Turkish mercenaries from across the Hellespont, whom Miller estimates at 3,800, many recently converted to Christianity. Under his command the Company established itself on the Gallipoli peninsula and devastated large areas of Thrace and Macedonia. His ambitions expanded, and he is said to have offered his services to Charles of Valois in the hope of securing a territorial base in Greece.

Rocafort also persuaded the Company to reject efforts by Frederick III of Sicily to bring them under his control, by sending Infante Ferdinand of Majorca to assume command. The Infante reached Greece, but the Catalans refused to accept him, and he returned to Sicily via the Duchy of Athens, accompanied by the chronicler Ramon Muntaner. (Note: Muntaner was a member of the Catalan Company in Anatolia and Greece from 1302 to 1307.) Pressed by the exhaustion of Thrace, the Company moved west in June 1307 and settled at the abandoned site of Kassandreia in Chalcidice in August. From there it continued raiding, including the plundering of the monasteries of Mount Athos in summer 1308.

=== Downfall and death ===
Having alienated the Crown of Aragon and seeking to bolster his legitimacy, Rocafort swore fealty to Thibaut de Cepoy, the representative of Charles of Valois. Effective power, however, remained with Rocafort, who began to envisage himself as an independent monarch. He aimed to seize Thessalonica and revive the defunct Crusader kingdom. He commissioned a royal seal bearing Saint Demetrios and a crown, and sought to extend his authority over the Duchy of Athens.

After Entença secured his release, the Byzantine chronicler George Pachymeres reports renewed clashes between the Catalan leaders, noting Entença fell in conflict with Rocafort's forces. Andrés Avelino Orihuela attributes Entença's death to Rocafort's brother Gilbert and their uncle Dalmau de San Martín. According to Donald Nicol, the Company eventually split into three factions under Rocafort, Entença and Fernand Ximenes de Arenos. Nicol states Rocafort murdered Entença, whereas Pachymeres attributes the death to a clash between their forces.

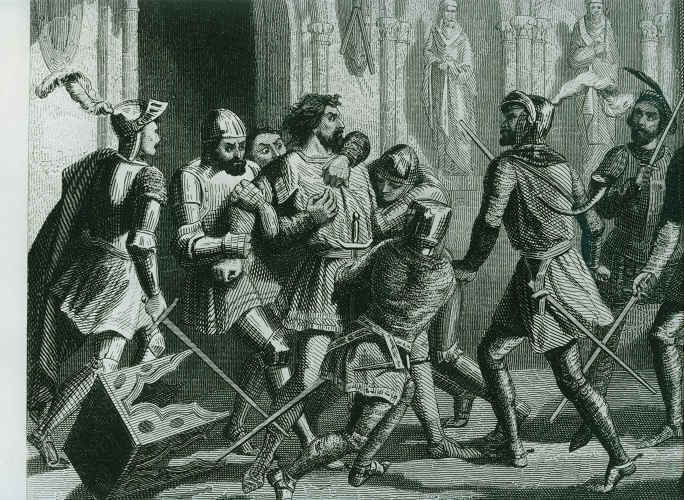
Engraving showing the arrest of Rocafort.

Rocafort entered negotiations with the childless duke Guy II de la Roche for a marriage with his sister Jeannette de Brienne. Guy II sent envoys to Kassandreia and considered using the Catalans to advance his wife's claims to the Principality of Achaea. These plans met opposition from the Venetians, who saw the Company as a danger to their colonies in Greece. The negotiations remained unresolved when the Company deposed Rocafort, having grown resentful of his increasingly autocratic leadership.

Nicol records Rocafort lost the confidence of his men in early 1309 and was replaced. Other sources state he was arrested in 1309 by Thibaut de Cepoy, handed to Robert I of Naples, imprisoned in Aversa and there died of starvation.

== See also ==
- Chronicle of Muntaner

== Sources ==
- "Bernat de Rocafort". enciclopedia.cat (in Catalan).
- Burns, Robert Ignatius (1978). Moors and Crusaders in Mediterranean Spain. Variorum. ISBN 978-0-86078-018-2.
- Carr, Mike (2015). Merchant Crusaders in the Aegean, 1291-1352. Boydell & Brewer. ISBN 978-1-84383-990-3.
- Chroniques étrangères relatives aux expéditions françaises pendant le XIIIe siècle [Foreign Chronicles About French Expeditions During The 13th Century]. Panthéon littéraire (in French). Abel Pilon. 1875.
- Gheorghe, Adrian (12 December 2022). The Metamorphoses of Power: Violence, Warlords, Aḳıncıs and the Early Ottomans (1300–1450). BRILL. ISBN 978-90-04-52667-9.
- Keightley, R. G. (1979). Muntaner and the Catalan Grand Company. Department of Modern Languages and Literatures. University of Ottawa.
- Miller, William (1964). The Latins in the Levant: A History of Frankish Greece (1204–1566). Cambridge Speculum Historiale.
- Nicol, Donald M. (14 October 1993). The Last Centuries of Byzantium, 1261–1453. Cambridge University Press. ISBN 978-0-521-43991-6.
- Orihuela, Andrés Avelino de (31 March 2022). The Sun of Jesús del Monte: A Cuban Antislavery Novel. University of Virginia Press. ISBN 978-0-8139-4622-1.
- Rapp, Claudia; Kinloch, Matthew; Krausmüller, Dirk; Mitsiou, Ekaterini; Nesseris, Ilias; Papavarnavas, Christodoulos; Preiser-Kapeller, Johannes; Rossetto, Giulia; Shukurov, Rustam; Simeonov, Grigori (12 June 2023). Mobility and Migration in Byzantium: A Sourcebook. V&R unipress. ISBN 978-3-7370-1341-3.
- Rogers, Clifford J. (2010). The Oxford Encyclopedia of Medieval Warfare and Military Technology. Oxford University Press. ISBN 978-0-19-533403-6.
- Setton, Kenneth M. (1975). "The Catalans in Greece, 1311–1388". In Hazard, Harry W. (ed.). A History of the Crusades, Volume III: The Fourteenth and Fifteenth Centuries. Madison, Wisconsin: University of Wisconsin Press. pp. 167–224. ISBN 978-0-299-06670-3.
- Venning, Timothy; Frankopan, Peter (1 May 2015). A Chronology of the Crusades. Routledge. ISBN 978-1-317-49643-4.
