= Battle of the Cyzicus =

Coordinates: 40°22′48″N 27°53′19″E

The Battle of the Cyzicus (Catalan: Batalla del riu Cízic) was fought in October 1303 between the Catalan Company of the East under Roger de Flor, acting as mercenaries on behalf of the Byzantine Empire, and the Oghuz Turks (likely Karasids). It was the first of several engagements between the two sides during the Catalan Company's Anatolian Campaign against the Turks.

The result was a crushing Catalan victory. The almogavars of the Catalan Company made a surprise attack on the Turkish camp located at Erdek, killing about 3000 cavalry and 10,000 infantry and capturing many women and children. Many of the Turkish women and children captured were sold into slavery.

== Bibliography ==
- de Moncada, Francisco; Gaya, Samuel Gili (1623). Expedicion de los catalanes y aragoneses contra turcos y griegos. L. Deu.
