= Peace of Caltabellotta =

1302 peace treaty

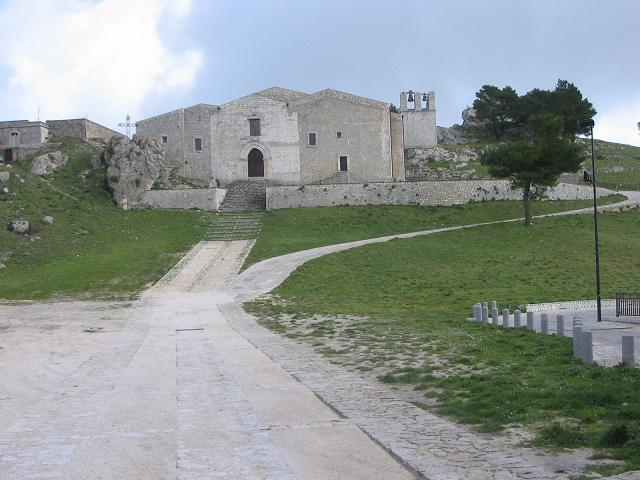
- The Madrice complex in Caltabellotta, near which stood the castle where the signing took place
- Type: Peace treaty
- Context: War of the Sicilian Vespers
- Signed: August 31, 1302
- Location: Caltabellotta
- Mediators: Pope Boniface VIII
- Original signatories: Charles, Count of Valois; Frederick III of Aragon
- Signatories: Charles II of Naples

The Peace of Caltabellotta, signed on 31 August 1302, was the last of a series of treaties, including those of Tarascon and Anagni, designed to end the War of the Sicilian Vespers between the Houses of Anjou and Barcelona for ascendancy in the Mediterranean and especially Sicily and the Mezzogiorno.

The peace divided the old Kingdom of Sicily into an island portion and a peninsular portion. The island, called the Kingdom of Trinacria, went to Frederick III, who had been ruling it; the Mezzogiorno, called the Kingdom of Sicily contemporaneously but the Kingdom of Naples by modern scholarship, went to Charles II, who had been ruling it. Thus, the peace was formal recognition of an uneasy status quo.

The treaty also stipulated that Trinacria would pass to the Angevins on Frederick's death, but until then, Charles paid a tribute of 100,000 ounces of gold in exchange to Frederick. Immediately, in exchange, Frederick handed over all his possessions in Calabria and elsewhere on the mainland and released Charles' son Philip, Prince of Taranto, from his prison in Cefalù. As well, the marriage of Charles' daughter Eleanor to Frederick was arranged.

The consequences of the treaty meant that Roger de Flor and his Almogavars of the Catalan Company had to seek pay elsewhere. They took up service with Byzantine Emperor Andronicus II Palaeologus. Bernat de Rocafort, an Almogàvar, did not want to return to Charles his two castles in Calabria until he was compensated with pay. He was captured and left to eventually die in an oubliette of Robert the Wise, Charles' successor, in 1309.

== Sources ==
- Gillespie, Alexander (2016). The Causes of War: Volume II: 1000 CE to 1400 CE. Vol. II. Hart Publishing.
- Jacoby, David (2015). "The Catalan Company in the East: The Evolution of an Itinerant Army (1303-1311)". In Halfond, Gregory I. (ed.). The Medieval Way of War: Studies in Medieval Military History in Honor of Bernard S. Bachrach. Ashgate Publishing.
- Nicol, Donald M. (1994). The Byzantine Lady: Ten Portraits, 1250–1500. Cambridge and New York: Cambridge University Press. ISBN 0-521-45531-6.
