= Enrico Tamberlik =

Italian opera singer (1820–1889)

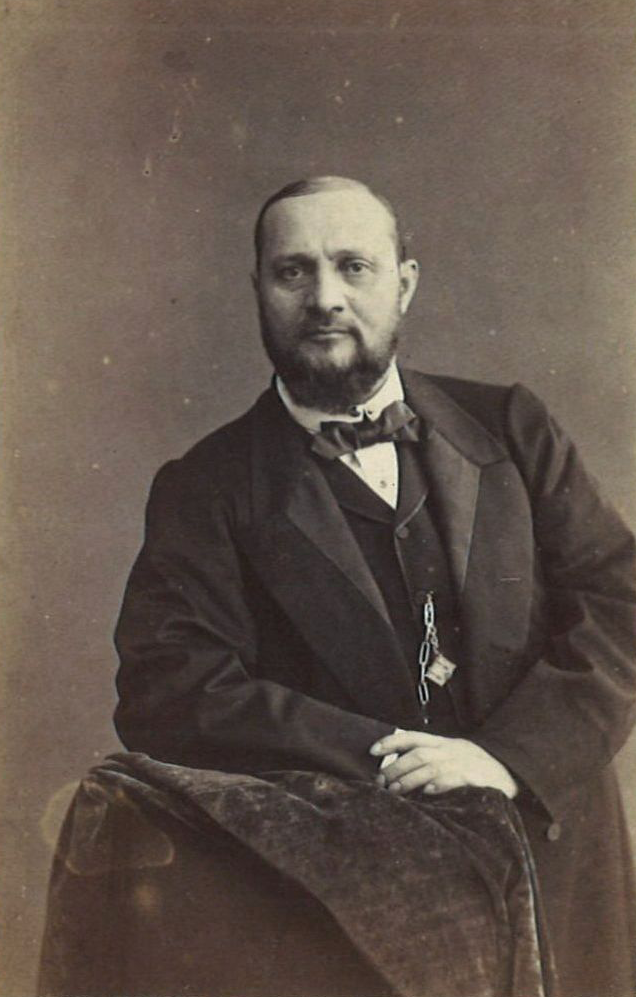
Enrico Tamberlik.

Enrico Tamberlik (16 March 1820 – 13 March 1889) was an Italian dramatic tenor who sang to great acclaim at Europe and America's leading opera venues. He excelled in the heroic roles of the Italian and French repertories and was renowned for his powerful declamation and clarion high notes.

== Career ==
Born in Rome, some sources claim that Tamberlik might have been of Romanian descent and that his real name was Nikita Torna. Nonetheless, his vocal training was entirely Italian. He studied first in Naples with Zirilli and Borgna, then in Bologna with Guglielmi, and finally in Milan with De Abella.

The budding tenore robusto made his debut in concert in 1837 and later graced the operatic stage for the first time at the Teatro Apollo in Rome, as Gennaro in Lucrezia Borgia and as Arnoldo in Guglielmo Tell. He subsequently appeared at the Teatro Fondo in Naples in 1841, under the name Enrico Danieli, as Tebaldo in I Capuleti e i Montecchi, and during the 1842–43 season, made his debut at the Teatro San Carlo, under the name Enrico Tamberlik (which he used henceforth). He appeared, too, in Madrid and Barcelona.

In 1850, Tamberlik debuted at the Royal Opera House in London's Covent Garden, as Masaniello in La muette de Portici. He was to appear regularly at Covent Garden until 1870, enjoying star billing each time. Tamberlik sang often at the Mariinsky Theatre in St Petersburg from 1850 until 1863, creating the role of Alvaro in Verdi's La forza del destino on 10 November 1862. He made his initial guest appearance at the Théâtre-Italien in Paris in 1858, returning there many times until 1877.

Tamberlik portrayed Alfredo in La traviata to the Violetta of Sofia Vera Lorini for the opening of the original Teatro Colón opera house in Buenos Aires in 1857. He also appeared in North America, singing at the Academy of Music in New York City during the 1873–74 season. He last singing engagements in London were at Her Majesty's Theatre in 1877. In 1878 at the wedding of Alfonso XII and Mercedes of Orléans he played the title role of the opera Roger de Flor, by Ruperto Chapí, at the Teatro Real. He toured Spain again in 1881 and retired from the operatic stage shortly afterwards. Tamberlik's death occurred in Paris, three days before his 69th birthday.

== Vocal characteristics and repertoire ==
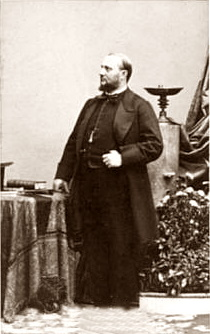
Photograph by André-Adolphe-Eugène Disdéri

Tamberlik succeeded Gaetano Fraschini (1816–1887) as Italy's leading tenore robusto, and he ranked behind only the more lyrical-voiced Giovanni Matteo Mario as the most celebrated Italian tenor of the middle decades of the 19th century. (Indeed, he and Mario actually sang together in a production of Meyerbeer's Robert le diable at Covent Garden.)

According to contemporary accounts of his singing, Tamberlik possessed a big, incisive voice with a pervasive vibrato (for which he was criticised by some English music critics) and ringing top notes—including a potent top C-sharp delivered in full chest voice. These virile vocal attributes, coupled with an imposing appearance, made him an exceptionally exciting interpreter of dramatic roles, especially such parts as Jean in Le prophète, Arnoldo in Guglielmo Tell and Manrico in Il trovatore. Other notable roles of his included (Rossini's) Otello, Pollione, Arturo, Ernani, Robert le diable, Faust, Don Ottavio, Florestan, Max, Poliuto and Cellini.

The heroic tenor Francesco Tamagno (1850–1905) was regarded as being Tamberlik's foremost successor. Their careers overlapped slightly and an echo of Tamberlik's voice and style may be preserved in the acoustic recordings that Tamagno made in Italy in 1903–1904 for the Gramophone & Typewriter Company.
