= Chronology of bladed weapons =

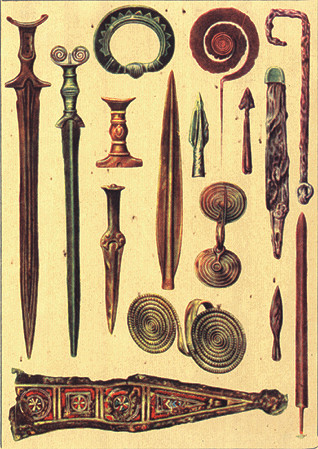
Weapons from the Bronze Age, Romania

The different bladed weapons (swords, dress-swords, sabers, rapiers, foils, machetes, daggers, knives, arrowheads, etc.) have been of great importance throughout history. In addition to its use for fighting, or in wars, bladed weapons have been the object of special considerations, forming part of funerary rituals, mythology and other ancestral traditions.

== History ==
The present chronology is a compilation that includes diverse and relatively uneven documents about different families of bladed weapons: swords, dress-swords, sabers, rapiers, foils, machetes, daggers, knives, arrowheads, etc., with the sword references being the most numerous but not the unique included among the other listed references of the rest of bladed weapons.

=== Prehistoric Era ===
The oldest known Oldowan tools were found in Gona, Ethiopia. These are dated to about 2.6 mya.

Early examples of hand axes date back to 1.6 mya in the later Oldowan (Mode I), called the "developed Oldowan" by Mary Leakey. These hand axes became more abundant in mode II Acheulean industries that appeared in Southern Ethiopia around 1.4 mya. Some of the best specimens come from 1.2 mya deposits in Olduvai Gorge.

=== Bronze swords ===
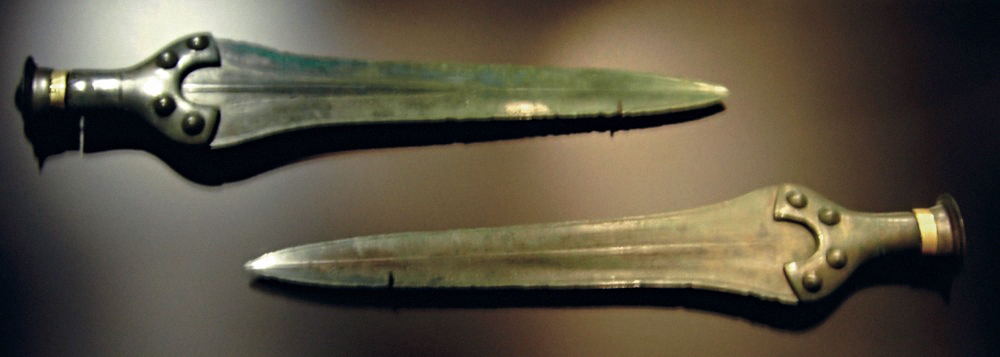
Swords found next to Nebra sky disk

Copper daggers appeared first in the early Bronze Age, in the 3rd millennium BC, and copper daggers of Early Minoan III (2400–2000 BC) were recovered at Knossos.

The earliest known depiction of a khopesh is from the Stele of the Vultures, depicting King Eannatum of Lagash wielding the weapon; this would date the khopesh to at least 2500 BC. The khopesh evolved from the epsilon or similar crescent-shaped axes that were used in warfare.

The first known bronze swords with a length equal to or greater than 60 cm date from the 17th century BC in regions of the Black Sea and the Aegean Sea. A sword must be constructed from the correct alloy, have the right shape, and have the necessary thermal (and finishing) treatments applied to it for it to be useful in combat. In a longer sword, the stresses (bending and buckling) are more important. What is needed is a weapon that is hard enough (to cut), fairly flexible (without being fragile) and quite durable enough to withstand blows.

The manufacturing process is summarized as follows: The bronze swords were cast into moulds, heated to a certain temperature and allowed to cool slowly before being cold hammered (a process whereby they are hit with a hammer on a type of anvil) to increase their hardness.

- c. 1275 BC. Assyrian sword, with inscriptions.
- c. 650 BC. According to Pausanias, Theodore of Samos invented the casting of bronze objects.

=== 5th century BC-5th century AD ===
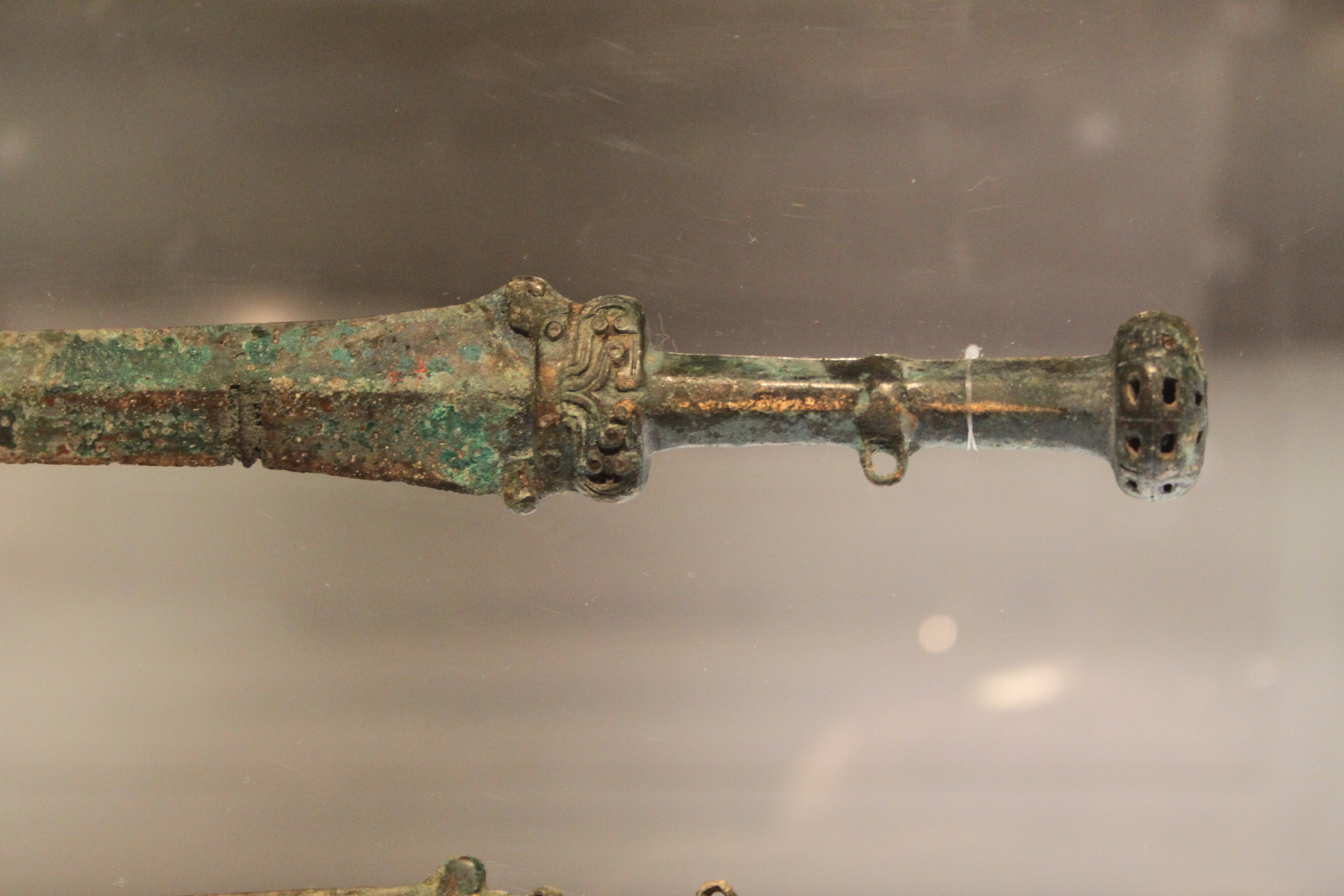
Spring and Autumn period bronze dagger hilt

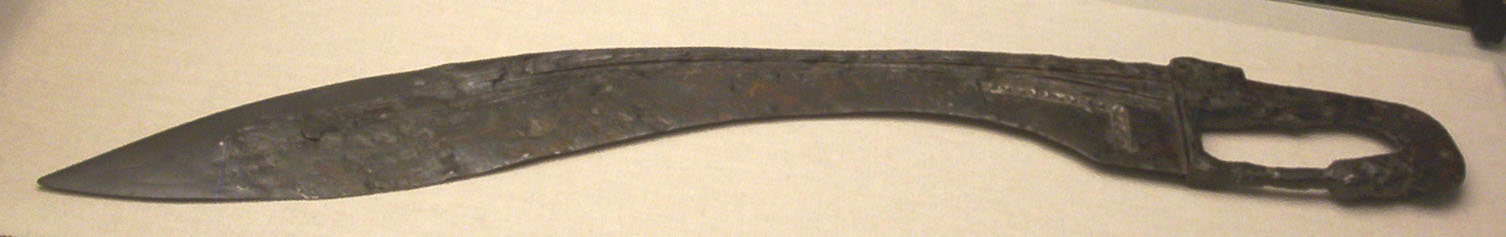
Falcata from the 4th century BC

- c. 450 BC. Herodotus. He mentioned iron swords (as a representation of the god Ares/Mars) in Scythian people's tombs
- c. 401 BC. He described the Indian steel (Wootz steel) and two swords made with that material.
- 326 BC. Battle of the Hidaspes River. Alexander defeated King Porus, who gave him about 10 kg of "Indian steel" (Wootz steel).
- c.230 BC. Philo of Byzantium In his treatise Belopoeica (artillery), he describes the flexibility of the swords of the Celts and Iberians in Hispania. An elastic behavior, such as a spring, would imply some tempered steel content in the mentioned swords.
- 216 BC. Battle of Cannae Polybius described the swords of the Iberians (good for cutting and thrusting) and those of the Gauls (good for cutting).
- c. 209 BC. After the Battle of Cartagena, Gladius was promoted by Scipio Africanus for the Roman army.
- 197 BC. The Gauls were defeated by the Romans, led by Gaius Cornelius Cetegus near the River Clusius (perhaps the current Brembo River). In spite of the numerical superiority of the Gauls, their swords were bent at the first blow and had to be straightened. The Romans took advantage of this weakness to win the battle.
- c. 20 BC. Diodorus Siculus was a Greek historian of Sicily that lived in the 1st Century BC, and a contemporary of Julius Caesar and Augustus. His comments on the celtiberian swords indicate the cut quality and an aspect of their manufacture.
- c. 5 BC. Gratio Falisco, in his poem Cynegeticon, mentions the knives of Toledo: "... Ima toledano praecingunt ilia cultro ..."
- c. 50. Pliny the Elder talks about the types of iron, and the importance of water in the temper of steel.
- c. 90 AD The poet Martial, born in Bilbilis (near Calatayud), prided himself on the steel of his country, better than the Gallic and the Noricum.

=== Middle Ages ===
The longsword emerges in the 14th century, as a military steel weapon of the earlier phase of the Hundred Years' War. It remains identifiable as a type during the period of about 1350 to 1550. Use of the two-handed Great Sword or Schlachtschwert by infantry (as opposed to their use as a weapon of mounted and fully armoured knights) seems to have originated with the Swiss in the 14th century.

In the Nanboku-chō period (1336–1392), long weapons such as ōdachi were popular, and along with this, sasuga (刺刀), a kind of tantō (short sword or knife) used by lower-ranking samurai lengthened and finally became katana.

The Turko-Mongol sabre was used by a variety of nomadic peoples of the Eurasian steppes, including Turkic and Mongolic groups, primarily between the 8th and 14th centuries.

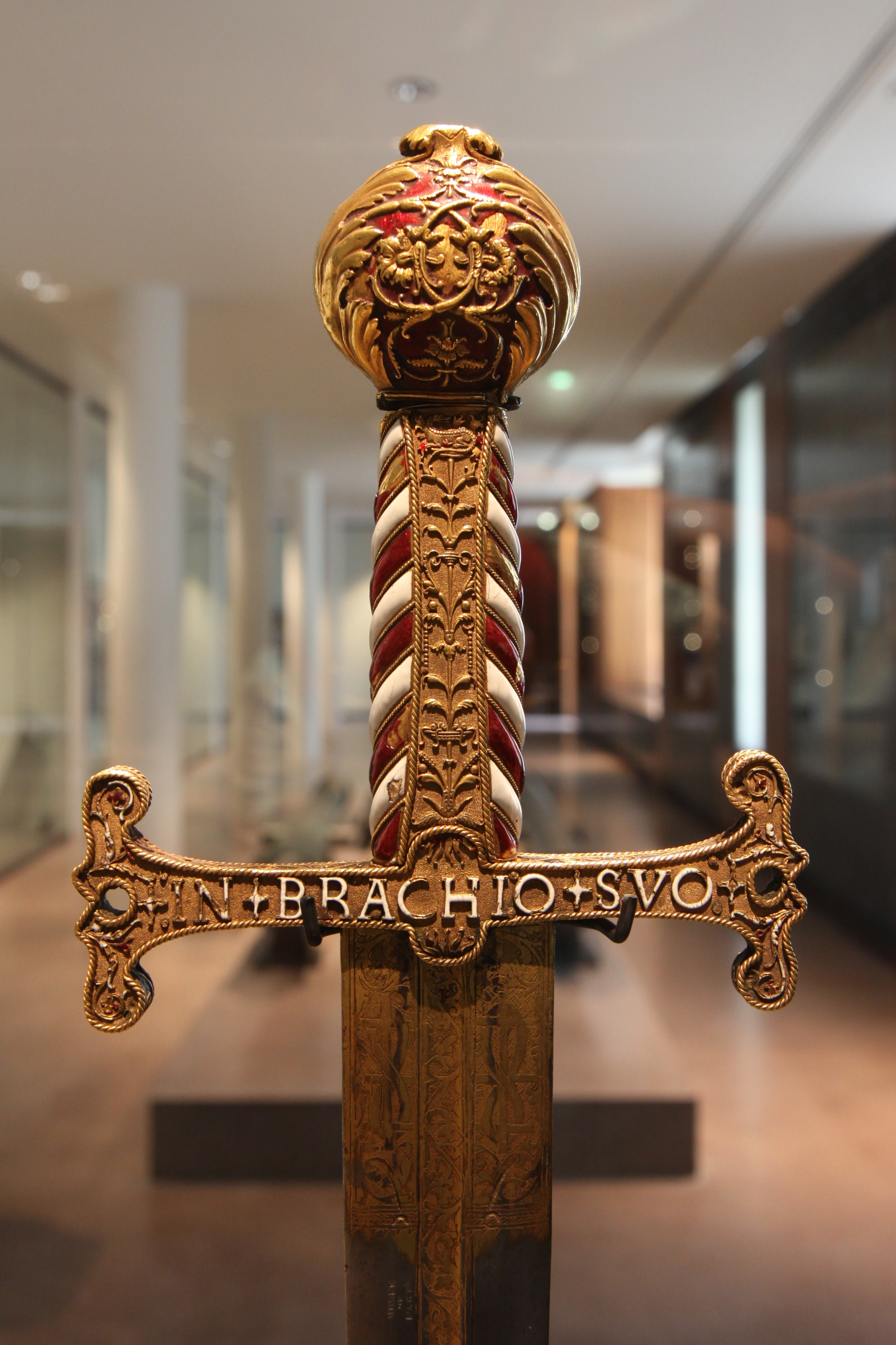
Sword of Francis I of France exposed in the "Musée de l'Armée" in Paris. Forged in Valencia by Antonivs.

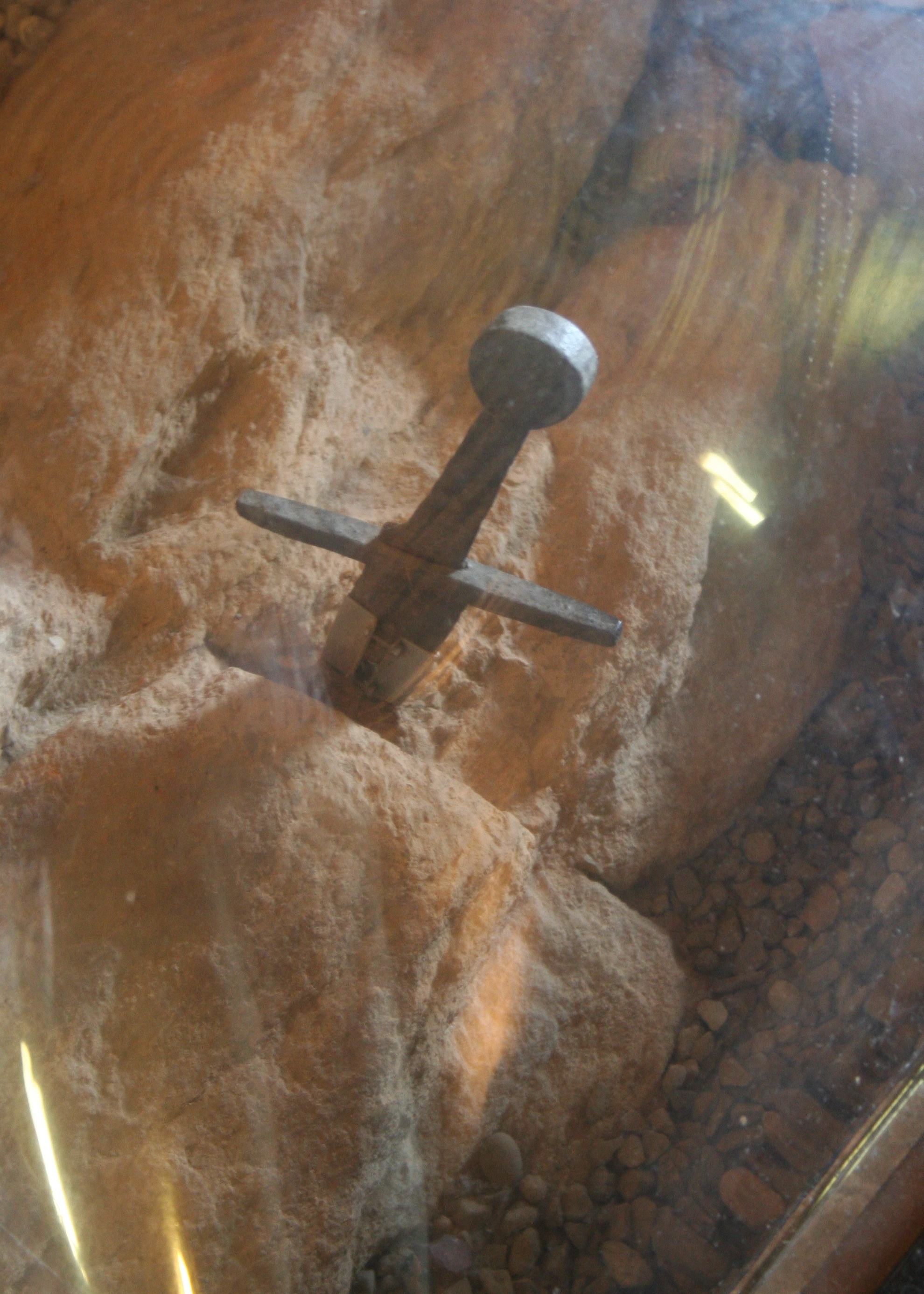
Sword of San Galgano nailed to the rock. Year 1181.

- c. 500. Ship wrecked near Nydam (Denmark) with a cargo of swords of the type "pattern-welded".
- c. 700. According to a Japanese legend from the province of Yamato, the sword maker Amakuni was concerned that many swords were broken in battle. And after days of work and prayer, he modified the forging and tempering process by getting swords that were curved and did not break in combat.
- 796. The emperor Charlemagne rendered the king Offa of Mercia with a sword made by Huns, obtained like war loot.
- 802. Harun al-Rashid possessed a sword of great quality, called Samsam or Samsamah. Supposedly it was a sword that had belonged to a king of Yemen. Nikephoros I, the Byzantine Emperor, sent him a few swords of Byzantine manufacture, indicating that he no longer wanted to pay the tribute. Harun broke them all with his Samsam sword, and he did not blunder the least.
- c. 850. Abu Yusuf well Ishaq al-Kindi describes the swords of Damascus.
- c. 900. First documentation of the tachi. Master Yasu-tsuna (from Hoki)
- 966. Embassy of Borrell II to To the-Hàkam II. giving a present of 100 "frank swords", very famous and feared.
- 1146. Earliest clear references to naginata.
- 1233. James I of Aragon mentions the sword called "Tiso" (forged in Monzón in the siege of Burriana.
- 1248. Sword Lobera of the king Fernando III de Castilla.
- 1274. Sword of the knight Soler de Vilardell (Sword of Vilardell). A sword considered magical, "of virtue". Its cut quality indicates a very successful manufacturing process.
- 1370. Last will of Peter IV of Aragon with the sword of Sant Martí and the sword of Vilardell.
- 1392. Ibn Hud Ibn Hudhayl, in his work " Gala de caballeros y blasón de paladines ", mentions two types of quality swords: those of Indian steel and those of the francs (Catalan) . The latter with exceptional qualities and supposedly forged by genius.
- 1425. The sword makers of Valencia asked for confirmation of their ordinations, copied from those of the sword makers of Barcelona.

....Item. Senyor los dits privilegis, capítols e ordinacions vees(?) plaurets a Déu a justícia (e) egualtat car axí son stats obtenguts per la spaseria de ciutat vostra de Barchinonae per vos atorgats (a) aquella segons han pres los prohomens de la spaseria de la dita vostra ciutat de Valencia...1425...Alfonsi Dei gratia Regis Aragonum, Sicilie, Valencie, Majoricam, Sardinie et ...

- Examination of applicants for master of sword making:

They had to present:“4 fulles d’espases e recapte per a guarniment de aquelles. Ço és la una fulla de dues mans la qual haie a guarnir vermella. E l’altra fulla sia de una mà la qual haie a esser guarnida mitadada de dues colors. E l’altra de una mà que sia buydada e guarnida tota negra. E la quarta ço és un estoch d’armes tot blanch los quals guarniments se vien(?) e haien a fer per lo volent usa(n)t de la dita spaseria dins la casa e habitació de un dels dits diputats...”

- 1433. Barcelona. In the "Book of the councils" of the guild of sword makers, the way of tempering the leaves of the swords is indicated.
  - In folio f_099r and others of the "Guild book of the sword makers" appears the expression "confrare ho confraressa" . Apparently a woman could belong to the guilt of sword makers. Maybe only as the wife or widow of a sword maker.

=== 1450-1700 AD ===
Bilbo, a cut-and-thrust sword were forged in Toledo from Basque bilbo steel and exported to Americas in 16th century.

Claymore in use from the 15th to 17th centuries, The word claymore was first used in reference to basket-hilted swords during the 18th century in Scotland and parts of England.

The first known mention of the use of bayonets in European warfare was in the memoirs of Jacques de Chastenet, Vicomte de Puységur. He described the French using crude 1-foot (0.30 m) plug bayonets during the Thirty Years' War (1618–1648).

- 1474. The fencing teacher of Majorca Jaume Ponç was the author of a fencing treatise published in Perpinyan.
- 1478. References of the sword maker Julián del Rey. Related to the famous swords with the mark of the "perrillo" (supposedly a stylized dog). He probably was the same persona as a former Muslim armourer who was baptised and under the protection of Fernando el Católico, who worked in Zaragoza and Toledo.
- 1509. Marriage of Catalina of Aragon and Henry VIII of England. Swords of the armoury of Zaragoza presented to the English king
- 1517. Superiority of the sword over other weapons in the war of the conquistadores against the Native Americans in Florida.
- 1522. Sword of Ignacio de Loyola offered to the Virgin of Montserrat.
- 1525. Battle of Pavia. Francis I of France surrendered his sword to Joan Aldana, a cavalier native of Tortosa.
- 1540. "Pirotechnia", work of Vannoccio Biringuccio, armourer of Siena. Among other topics it deals with some iron mines and the reduction of the mass in a forge with bellows.
- c. 1541. Sword of Francisco Pizarro, made in Valencia by the armourer Mateo Duarte.
- 1544. Hunting saber of Henry VIII of England, decorated by Diego Çaias.
- 1546. Georgius Agricola (Latinized name of Georg Bauer). Work "De Natura Fossilium" which deals with mineralogy. He talks about iron exporting regions and the area of ??Noricum (now Steyr in Austria) that produced steel for the quality of the mineral. In other places (Bilbao, Turassio in Spain and Como in Italy) steel would be "manufactured" by the quality of the water.
- 1547. Mentioned the sword called "de San Martí". (See year 1370)
- 1547. Law agreed on the maximum length of the sword-blades of Mallorca, Valencia and Catalonia.
- 1579. Styria records delivery of some 700 Dusäggen by local bladesmiths, besides payment of 40 Dusäggen delivered from Passau, as part of the preparation for the war against the Turks under Archduke Charles II.
- 1599. The Pope Clement VIII gives a sword of Solingen as a present to the king Henry IV of France.
- 1600. Rapier developed as a result of the geometrical theories of such masters as Camillo Agrippa, Ridolfo Capo Ferro, and Vincentio Saviolo.
- 1611. Oldest definition of a cinquedita. (“Cinquedita: a weapon but five fingers long used in Venice”. Similar to a sgian-dubh. So the modern definition of Cinquedea should be inaccurate.).

=== 1700-1950 AD ===
The Dirk was the traditional sidearm of the Highland Clansman and later used by the officers, pipers, and drummers of Scottish Highland regiments around 1725 to 1800

The modern Épée (épée) derives from the 19th-century épée de combat, a weapon which itself derives from the French small sword.

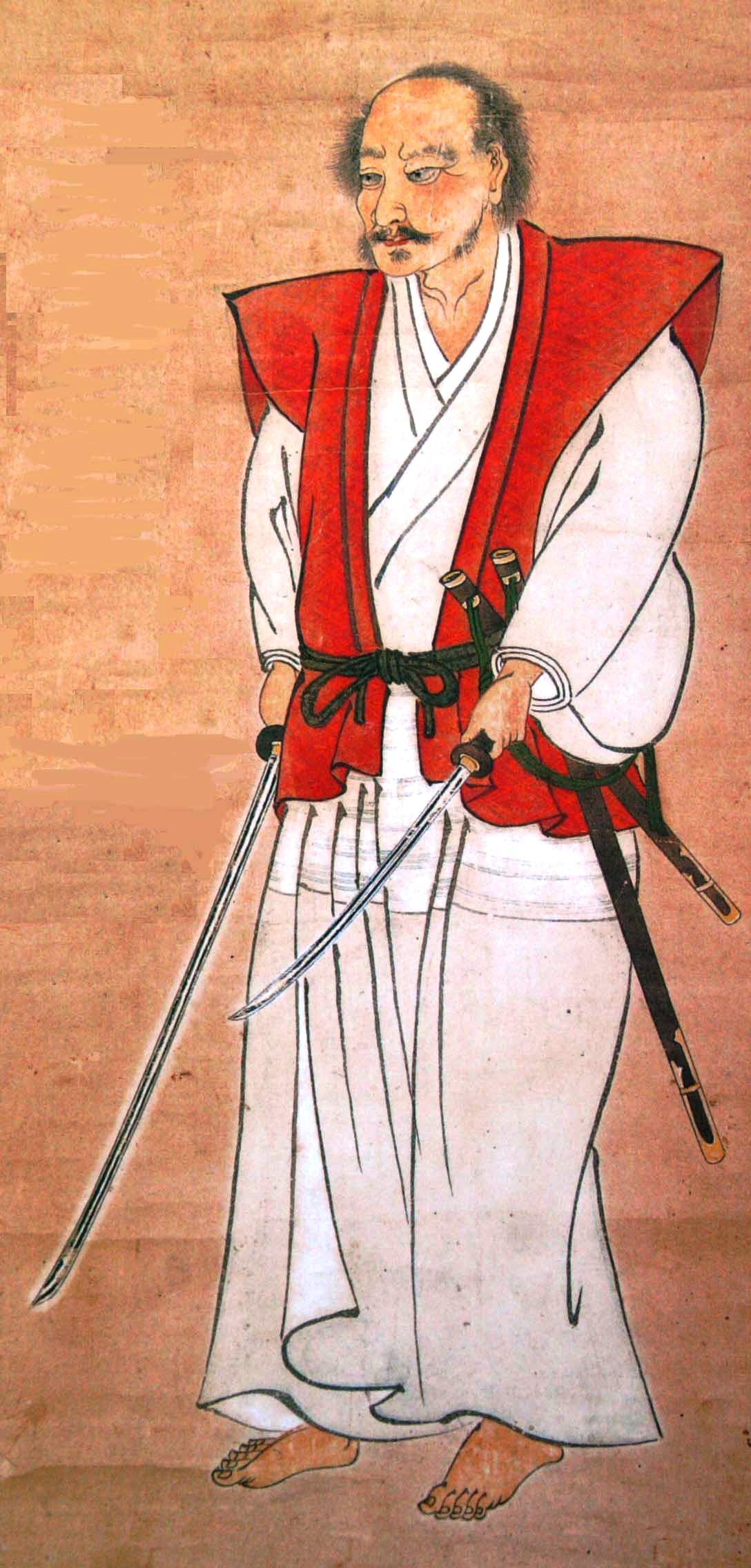
Miyamoto Musashi.

- 1742. "Dictionnaire Universel De Commerce", Jacques Savary des Bruslons, Philémon-Louis Savary. French name of the composite leaves with iron core and steel exterior ("lame de ettofe").
- 1750. News about the "varnished iron" or "iron" mines of Mondragón.
- 1760. Carlos III of Spain orders to Luis de Urbina, infantry colonel, a report on the bladed weapons factories of Toledo, Valencia, Zaragoza and Barcelona (in precarious state) to establish a new factory in Toledo
- 1761. " Bladed weapons Factory of Toledo" (Fábrica de armas blancas de Toledo), created by decree of Carlos III of Spain. It was organized and directed by the Valencian sword's master Lluis Calisto, contracted expressly.
- 1766. Esquilache Riots
- 1772. Henry Nock was the founder of a gun-making company. He bequeathed to his manager James Wilkinson, maker of the famous swords and sabers.
- 1772. Rules for Californian presidios. Soldado de cuera. Cutting arms. Broad sword and lance characteristics.
- 1781–1782. For the armament of the Presidio of Santa Barbara (California) the swords of Toledo are rejected and they are asked for German, Valencian or Barcelona swords, more suitable for military tasks. According to Felipe de Nieve report English by Richard S. Whitehead): "... Uniforms are in deplorable shape due to the fact that supply ships have not arrived. Much of the equipment is defective. Safeties on the pistols are inoperative and The swords of Toledo are so tempered that they can be broken to pieces if they are used carelessly. ".
- 1782. William Bowles, "Introduction to Natural History and the Physical Geography of Spain." With information on the making of swords in Spain.
- 1793–1795. War of the Pyrenees. The weapon workshops in Catalonia, are opened again.
- 1798. History of the political economy of Aragon. Ignacio Jordán de Assó. talks about the sword makers of Zaragoza .
- 1804. James Wilkinson.
- 1844. Henry Wilkinson
- 1849. "Barcelona General Guide"; Manuel Saurí, José Matas. Describes the sword of the guild of sword makers of Barcelona (60 inches long, 24 inches to the crosshead), which required a strong man to carry it in parades.
- 1851. Sword of Toledo (of Manuel de Ysasi) presented to the Great Exhibition of London. It could be unsheathed and sheathed in a nearly circular sheath.
- 1856. Details of the manufacture of swords (according to the Toledo Factory).
- 1865. Henry George O'Shea. "A guide to Spain". List of swords of the armoury of the Royal Palace of Madrid (at the time of the publication of the work).
- 1943. Sword of Stalingrad
