= Hranislav =

Bulgarian military commander

- Allegiance: Second Bulgarian Empire; Byzantine Empire
- Service years: 1270s, 1300s (documented)
- Rank: possibly Bulgarian megas primikerios Byzantine megas tzaousios
- Conflicts: Uprising of Ivaylo; Byzantine–Catalan campaigns against the Anatolian beyliks

Hranislav (Bulgarian: Хранислав; Medieval Greek: Χρανίσθλαβος, Chranisthlavos) (fl. 1278–1304) was a Bulgarian military commander who was a close associate of rebel leader and later Tsar Ivaylo (r. 1277–1280). After being captured by the Byzantines, Hranislav entered the service of Andronikos II Palaiologos (r. 1282–1328) as his megas tzaousios. As a Byzantine officer, he commanded a detachment which assisted the Catalan Company in the wars against the Anatolian Beyliks in Asia Minor.

== Biography ==
Few details are known about Hranislav prior to his capture by the Byzantines. Byzantine historian George Pachymeres describes him as a "warlike man, a Bulgarian by descent" and one of Ivaylo's officers and supporters. Historian Plamen Pavlov theorizes that Hranislav must have been an early follower of Ivaylo from the very outbreak of his uprising and thus one of his most trusted commanders. He believes Hranislav was granted the Byzantine loan-title of megas primikerios after Ivaylo was installed in the capital Tarnovo.

Hranislav was taken captive by the armies of Michael VIII Palaiologos (r. 1259–1282), whose campaigns against Bulgaria in 1278–1280 sought to eliminate Ivaylo and put Ivan Asen III (r. 1279–1280) on the Bulgarian throne. Hranislav had to spend at least a few years imprisoned in Constantinople before Michael's son and next Byzantine Emperor Andronikos II Palaiologos released him. Andronikos desired to make use of Hranislav's military talents and elevated him to the status of megas tzaousios. Bulgarian scholars interpret the role of the megas tzaousios as the head of the imperial guard and a chief assistant of the megas primikerios. In fact, the nature of this military office, which derives from Turkish çavuş, "messenger", is far from clear.

In his new duty as a Byzantine general, Hranislav was deployed to northwest Asia Minor, where his major task was the defence of that province against the advancing Turks. He was subordinate to the Western mercenary Roger de Flor and his Catalan Company, though he stood in charge of a separate military unit. His forces may have included a Bulgarian participation of unknown number.

Hranislav's detachment took part in the Byzantine–Catalan victory over the Turks at Germe in the spring of 1304. However, the distribution of loot proved to be a major matter of dispute between Roger and Hranislav. The former accused the latter of greediness and in the ensuing conflict hanged twelve of his soldiers. Roger even stabbed Hranislav with his sword and was about to hang him, had it not been for the intervention of other Byzantine generals, who saved the Bulgarian due to his "many praiseworthy acts". Nothing is known of Hranislav's destiny after 1304, although he is not mentioned to have died from his wounds.

== Legacy ==
Hranislav is briefly referenced in national writer Ivan Vazov's 1907 novel Svetoslav Terter. In one of the chapters, the book tells the story of Hranislav's fictional nephew Radoil, a brigand and adventurer who fought the Tatars of Nogai Khan and the Seljuks. In Vazov's novel, Hranislav is described as a famous hero from Ivaylo's time.

== Sources ==
- Failler, Albert, ed. (1999). Georges Pachymères: Relations historiques. IV, Livres X–XIII (in French). Paris: Institut d'études byzantines. ISBN 2-901049-39-7.
- Kazhdan, Alexander, ed. (1991). Oxford Dictionary of Byzantium. Oxford University Press. ISBN 978-0-19-504652-6.
- Андреев, Йордан; Лазаров, Иван; Павлов, Пламен (1999). Кой кой е в средновековна България [Who is Who in Medieval Bulgaria] (in Bulgarian). Петър Берон. ISBN 978-954-402-047-7.
- Иречек, Константин (1978) [1886]. Петър Хр. Петров (ed.). История на българите [History of the Bulgarians] (in Bulgarian). Наука и изкуство. OCLC 66252579.
- Павлов, Пламен (2005). "Съратници и последователи на Ивайло" [Brothers-in-arms and followers of Ivaylo]. Бунтари и авантюристи в средновековна България [Rebels and Venturers in Medieval Bulgaria] (in Bulgarian). Варна: LiterNet. ISBN 954-304-152-0.
- "Хранислав (?)" [Hranislav (?)]. Българска енциклопедия А–Я [Bulgarian Encyclopedia A–Ya] (CD) (in Bulgarian). БАН, Труд, Сирма. 2002. ISBN 954-8104-08-3.
