= Catalan Company =

14th century mercenary company

- Companyia Catalana d'Orient
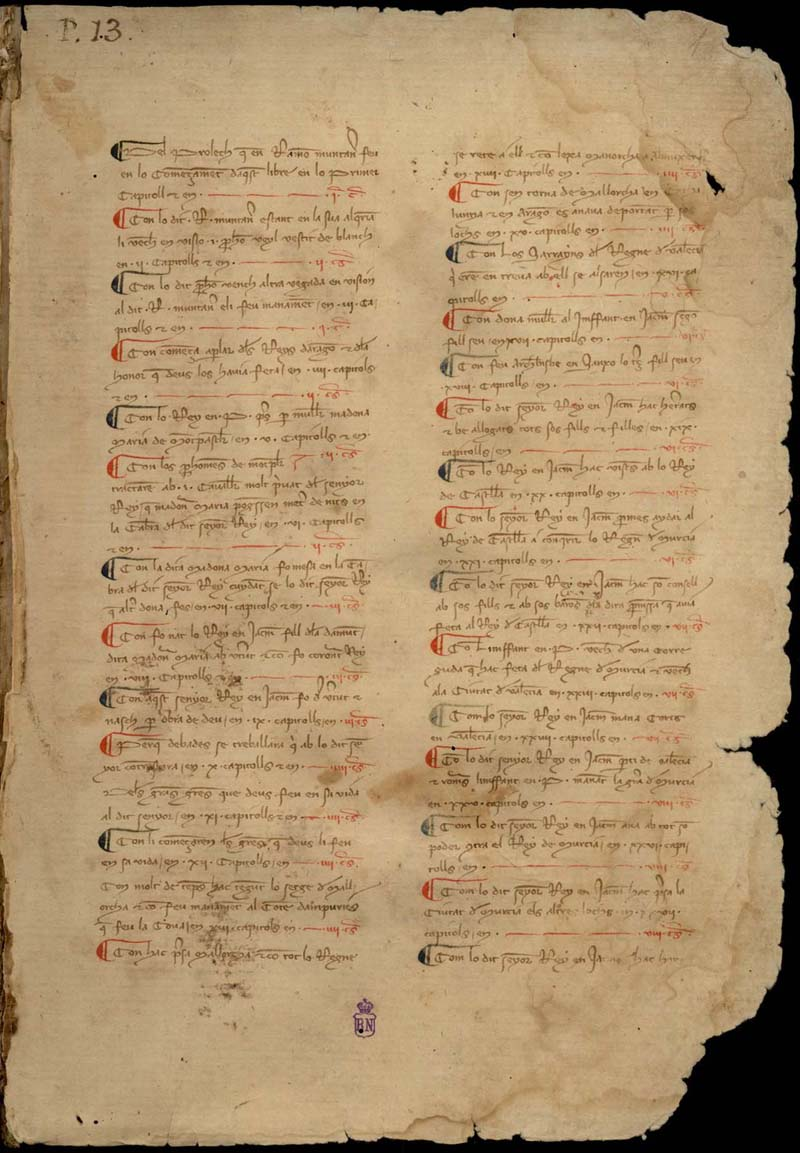
- Manuscript of the Crònica of Ramon Muntaner
- Active: 1302–1390
- Country: Byzantine Empire, Crown of Aragon, Kingdom of Sicily
- Type: Free company of mercenaries

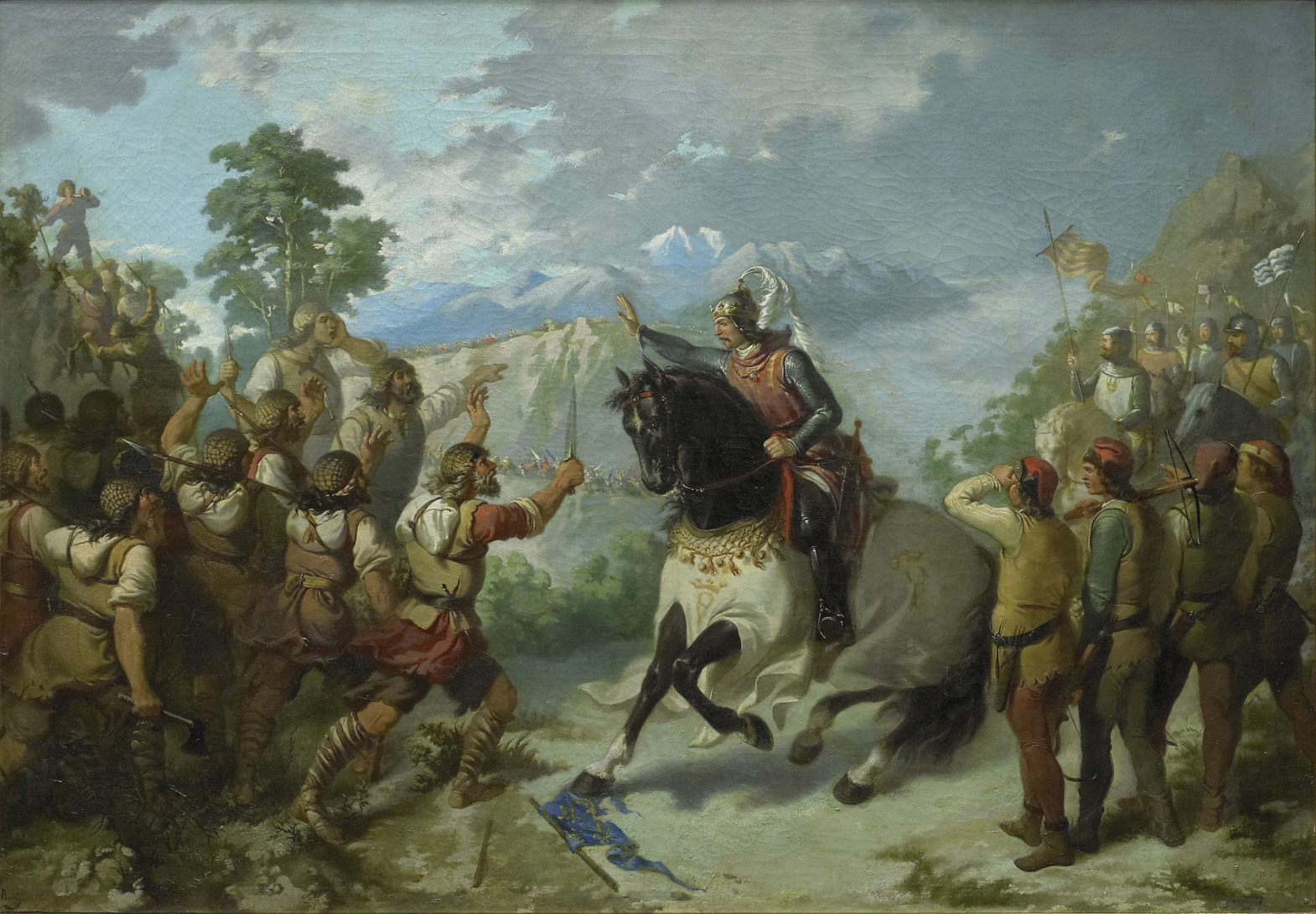
Peter III the Great with his almogavars in the Battle of the Col de Panissars. Bartomeu Ribó Térriz (1866)

The Catalan Company or the Great Catalan Company (Catalan: Gran Companyia Catalana; Societas exercitus catalanorum, Societas cathalanorum, or Magna Societas Catalanorum) was a company of mercenaries led by Roger de Flor in the early 14th century and hired by Byzantine Emperor Andronikos II Palaiologos to combat the increasing power of the Anatolian beyliks. It was formed by almogavar veterans of the War of the Sicilian Vespers, who had remained unemployed after the signing in 1302 of the Peace of Caltabellotta between the Crown of Aragon and the French dynasty of the Angevins.

== Origin ==
The military demands of the Reconquista stimulated the formation of the elite light infantry known as the almogavars on the Iberian peninsula during the 13th century. These troops were used quite effectively by the Crown of Aragon for other imperial ventures in the Mediterranean, particularly the War of the Sicilian Vespers. They were typically organised in companies (societates) of 20 to 50 men, following a chief of recognized military skill. The signing of the Peace of Caltabellotta in 1302 terminated that struggle in Sicily, leaving the almogavars without immediate employment.

James II of Aragon and his brother Frederick III of Sicily saw the threat posed to civil order. While Frederick would have liked to retain some of them for the defence of Sicily, they could not, by custom, be forced to do so. Instead, many of the almogavars were recruited into a "company of companies", led by the mercenary Roger de Flor, to be paid in Byzantine service.

The organisation was referred to by the (hostile) Angevin and papal chancelleries as the [Magna] Societas [exercitus] Catalanorum, the [Great] Catalan [military] Company. The Sicilian chancellery referred to them as Francorum, "Frankish", as Western Europeans were called in Byzantium, However, the written letters produced by the Company were mainly in Catalan.

== Arrival at Constantinople ==
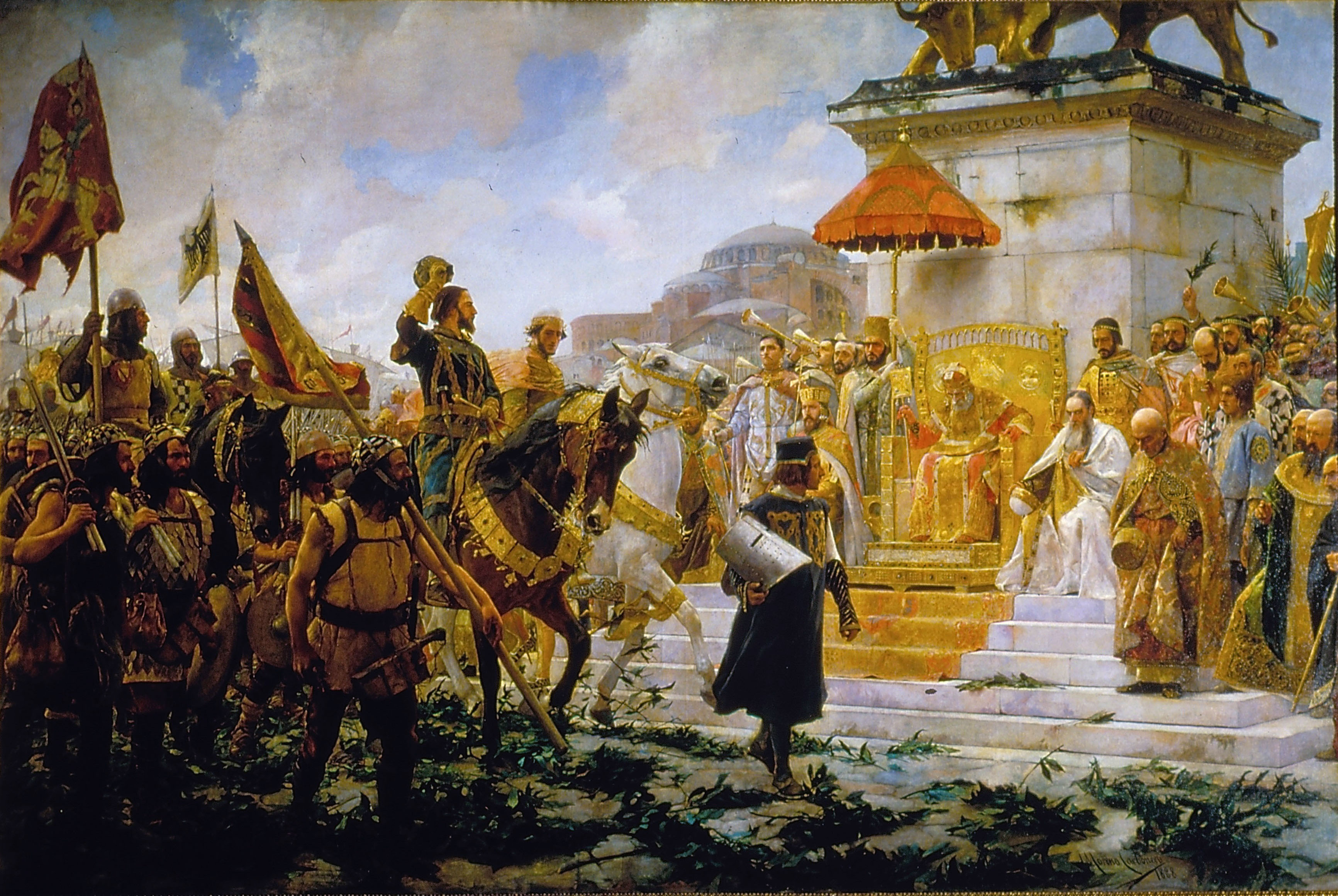
Roger de Flor is received by the Byzantine emperor. Entrance of Roger de Flor in Constantinople (1888). Work of José Moreno Carbonero (Palace of the Senate, Madrid).

The Great Catalan Company departed from Messina with 36 ships (including 18 galleys) transporting about 8,000 men (1,500 cavalry, 4,000 almogavar foot soldiers and an indeterminate number of servants and auxiliary personnel). The exact figures are a matter of dispute, for although the numbers provided by Ramon Muntaner are trusted by later historians Francisco de Moncada and George Pachymeres, the contemporary Byzantine historian Nicephorus Gregoras gives a total number of only 1,000 men.

After a brief stop at Monemvasia, the Company arrived at Constantinople in January 1303, where it was received by the Emperor and housed in the district of Blachernae. Emperor Andronikos II Palaiologos arranged the wedding of Roger de Flor to his niece, the 15 year old princess Maria Asanina, daughter of the Tsar of Bulgaria Ivan Asen III and Irene Palaiologina. De Flor was named Megas Doux (Great Dux, i.e. Commander of the Imperial forces).

The arrival of the new mercenary contingent upset the balance of power that supported the Byzantine Empire. It especially irritated the Genoese, who saw the arrival of the Catalan Company as an intrusion by the House of Barcelona into the area of influence of the Republic of Genoa: the Eastern Mediterranean and the Byzantine Empire. Armed conflict was not long in breaking out, with 3,000 Genoese killed (including their leader Rosso del Finar) in what was called the Genoese massacre in September 1303.

== Campaigns in Anatolia ==
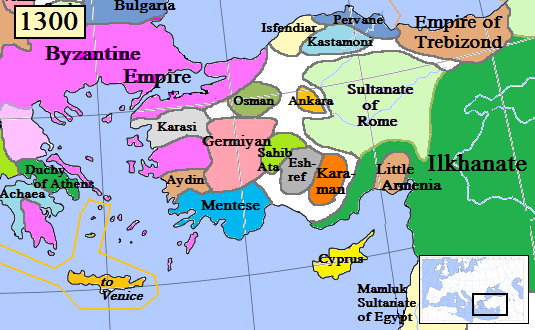
Anatolia in 1300

=== Battle of the Cyzicus (1303) ===
After those incidents and the recent defeat of the Byzantines in the Battle of Bafeus, the Emperor ordered Roger de Flor to move his almogavars as soon as possible to the battle front in Anatolia, in modern-day Turkey. Transported there in the fleet commanded by the Catalan Admiral Ferran d'Aunés, Roger de Flor's troops disembarked at Cape Artake, near the ruins of ancient Cyzicus. They soon achieved a great victory against the Karasid Turks in the Battle of the Cyzicus in October 1303. The almogavars made a surprise attack on the Oghuz Turkish camp located at Cape Artake, killing about 3,000 cavalry and 10,000 infantry and capturing many women and children.

After this victory, Roger de Flor decided to postpone a planned march to the besieged town of Philadelphia and spent the winter on Cape Artake, a position that provided good defences and an easy means of supply. During this period Ferran Eiximenis d'Arenós temporarily left the company after a disagreement with Roger de Flor, putting himself in the service of the Duke of Athens. Roger de Flor, on the other hand, took advantage of the lull to travel with his wife to Constantinople with four galleys, claim payment from the Emperor and discuss with him the next campaign. Emperor Andronikos happily paid Roger de Flor and entrusted him with the liberation of Philadelphia.

On his return to Cyzicus, Roger de Flor found that his undisciplined troops had already spent twice or triple their pay and had been out plundering. Greek historians say that the region of Cyzicus was devastated by the looting of the almogavars, to the point that the sister of Andronikos had to go to the city to exhort Roger to move his troops immediately to Philadelphia.

=== Battle of Germe ===
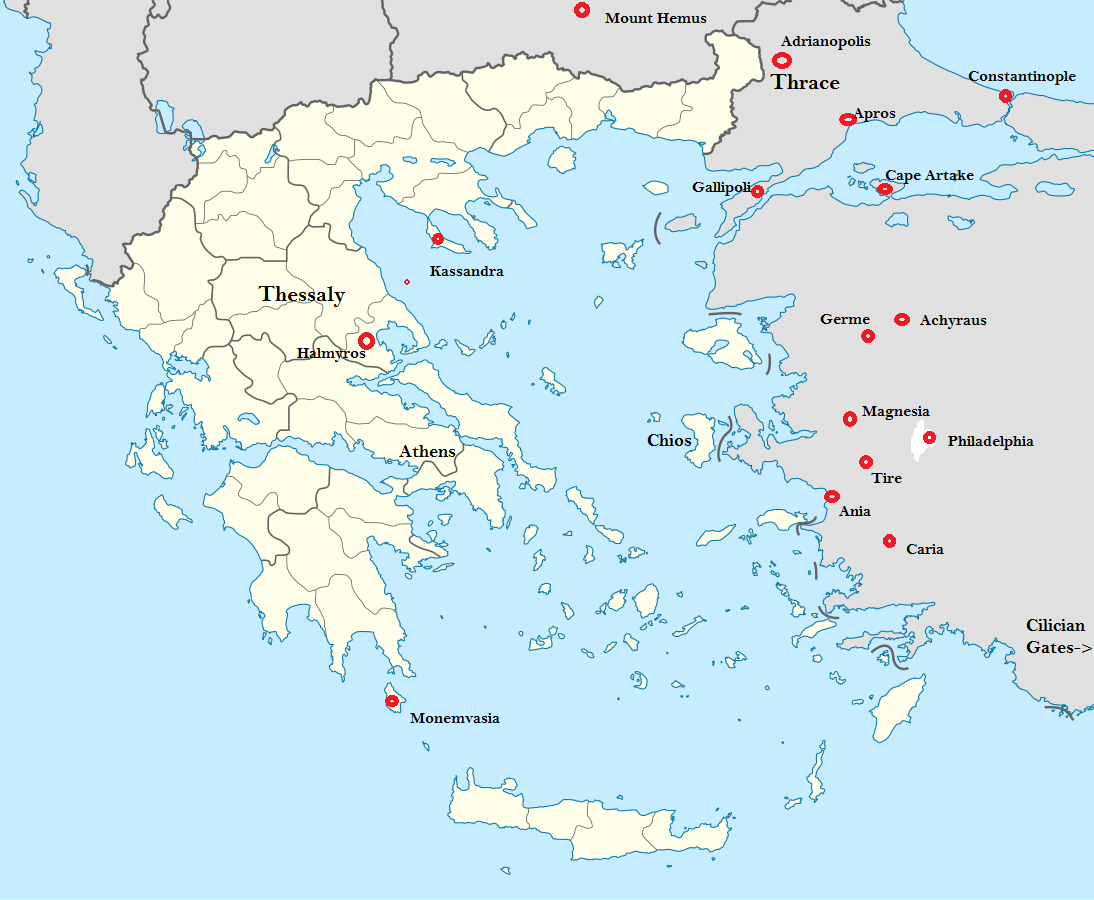
Map showing sites mentioned in article

The 1304 campaign began with a month's delay because of continuous disputes between the almogavars and their Alan allies, which caused 300 deaths in the forces of the latter. Finally, in early May, Roger de Flor began the campaign to raise the siege of Philadelphia with 6,000 almogavars and 1,000 Alans. Philadelphia at that time was suffering from a siege by Yakup bin Ali Şir, governor of the Germiyanids from the powerful emirate of Germiyan-oğhlu. After a few days, the almogavars arrived at the Byzantine city of Achyraus and descended by the valley of the River Kaikos until they arrived at the city of Germe (now known as Soma), a Byzantine fortification that had previously fallen to the Turks. The Turks who were there tried to flee as fast as possible, but their rearguard was attacked by the troops of Roger de Flor in what came to be called the Battle of Germe.

=== Battle of Aulax and liberation of Philadelphia ===
After the victory in Germe, the Company resumed its march, passing through Chliara (modern Kırkağaç) and Thyatira and entered the valley of the Hermos River. On their way, they stopped in various places, abusing the Byzantine governors for their lack of courage. Roger de Flor even planned to hang some of them; naming the Bulgarian captain Sausi Crisanislao, who finally obtained a pardon.

Upon learning of the imminent arrival of the Great Company, Bey Yakup bin Ali Şir, head of the coalition of the Turkish troops from the emirates of Germiyan-oğhlu and Aydın-oğhlu, decided to lift the siege of Philadelphia and face the Company in a suitable location (Aulax) with his 8,000 cavalry and 12,000 infantry.

Roger de Flor took command of the Company cavalry, dividing it into three contingents (Alans, Catalans and Greeks), while Corbarán of Alet did the same with the infantry. The Catalans achieved a great victory over the Turks in what would come to be known as the Battle of Aulax, with only 500 Turkish infantry and 1,000 cavalrymen managing to escape alive. After this battle de Flor made a triumphant entrance into Philadelphia, being received by its magistrates and the bishop Teoleptos.

Having already accomplished the principal mission entrusted to him by the emperor, Roger de Flor decided to consolidate the defence of Philadelphia by conquering the nearby fortresses which had fallen into the hands of the Turks. Thus, the almogavars marched north towards the fortress of Kula, forcing the Turks who were there to flee. The Greek garrison of Kula received Roger de Flor as a liberator, but he, not appreciating how a seemingly impregnable fortress could be allowed to fall into the hands of the Turks without a battle, beheaded the governor and condemned the commander to the gallows. The same harshness was applied when, days later, the almogavars took the fortification of Furnes, further north. Then, Roger de Flor returned with his troops to Philadelphia to claim payment for his successful campaign.

=== Occupation of Magnesia ===
The captains of the Company then resolved to attack the maritime provinces of the Turks. From Philadelphia the Company retreated through the valley of the river Hermos and entered the prefecture of the city of Magnesia (modern Manisa), the only territory of Anatolia that remained under the control of the Byzantines. Magnesia had solid walls and was a few miles from the island of Chios, where the Catalan Company fleet was anchored under the command of Ferran d'Aunés. In those circumstances, Roger de Flor decided to occupy the city and establish his headquarters there, and to transfer there his spoils of war and to garrison it with his troops. From the viewpoint of the Greeks, Roger de Flor began to act not so much as a mercenary or military leader but as the governor of all Anatolia, thus winning the enmity of the prefect Nostongos Ducas and the governor of the city of Magnesia, Demetrios Ataliota. Nostongo Ducas traveled to Constantinople to report the situation to the emperor, thereby causing consternation in the capital.

=== Battle of Tire ===
After leaving his spoils and a small garrison of almogavars in Magnesia, the troops of Roger de Flor arrived at the city of Nif (Nymphaion), where he received a request for aid from two inhabitants of Tire. It appeared that the surviving Turkish troops of the battle of Aulax had united with those of the Emirate of Menteşe-oğhlu and begun a joint attack on Tire. Roger de Flor divided his force into two and ordered one half to return to Magnesia. The remaining troops under de Flor made a forced march to arrive at the walls of Tire in the dead of night, entering the city without being spotted by the besieging Turks. The Battle of Tire began the following morning, when the Turks assembled on a plain near the city to prepare the assault, expecting to find in Tire only a small garrison of Greek soldiers.

Inside Tire, Roger de Flor ordered his seneschal Corberán of Alet to prepare a detachment of 200 men on horseback and 2,000 almogavars. When the Turks approached the walls, the troops led by Corberán of Alet rushed out of the city and attacked the Turks, who in a short time suffered the loss of 700 men on horseback and even more infantrymen. In panic, the rest of the Turkish cavalry fled to the mountains chased by the almogávar cavalry. Corberán of Alet decided to continue the attack on the retreating Turks as they began to climb the mountains, ordering his cavalrymen to dismount and climb after them. In response, the Turks harassed the almogavars by throwing stones and firing arrows, one of which killed Corberán of Alet, striking his head at a moment when his helmet had been removed. The almogavar troops, shocked by the death of the seneschal of the company, interrupted their pursuit and retreated to Tire carrying the corpse of Corberán of Alet, thus allowing the surviving Turks to escape.

When the troops returned to Tire and informed Roger de Flor of the death of his seneschal, he ordered that Corberán of Alet be buried with all honors in the Church of San George, located two leagues from the city, and that his tomb be beautifully decorated. The Company remained stationed in Tire for eight more days.

=== Arrival of Bernat of Rocafort ===
In the course of the Battle of Tire, Bernat de Rocafort arrived at Constantinople from the Kingdom of Sicily. Bernat had not joined the company the previous year after he had refused to accept the terms of the Peace of Caltabellotta, which forced him to return two castles he had conquered in the Kingdom of Naples. Finally, in July 1304, he decided to join the company and weighed anchor for Constantinople with 200 cavalrymen, 1,000 almogavars and two galleys.

There, he was received by Andronikos, who informed him that the company was on the island of Chios. Bernat then made for Chios, where he met the fleet captained by Ferran d'Aunés, and together they sailed to Ania (now Kuşadası). Once in Ania, they were received by Ramon Muntaner, who led Bernat to Ephesus, where he met Roger de Flor, who named Bernat the new seneschal of the company (replacing the late Corberán of Alet) and gave him his daughter (who had been engaged to Corberan) in marriage and provided him with 100 horses and money for his men.

Roger de Flor and Bernat de Rocafort then marched to Ania but not without first asking for further war contributions in Ephesus, again accompanied by numerous abuses and looting by the almogavars. After his departure, Roger de Flor entrusted the safety of Tire to the Aragonese Diego de Orós with 30 cavalry men and 100 infantrymen.

=== Battle of Ania ===
For their part, the surviving troops of the Emirate of Aydin managed to regroup around Ania and frightened its population. In the face of that provocation, the almogavars decided to charge immediately against them in complete disorder and without receiving orders from any of their captains. In spite of the disorder, they were victorious at the Battle of Ania and killed 1,000 cavalrymen and 2,000 Turkish infantry.

After the new victory, the captains decided to return to the eastern provinces and seek a great confrontation with the Turks in the hinterland of Anatolia since the limited number of soldiers of the Company did not allow a war of occupation.

=== Battle of Kibistra ===
In July 1304, the Company began to march through the regions of Caria and Lycaonia and linked up with the road that the Crusaders had followed two centuries earlier on their way to the Holy Land. Finally, the Company reached the Cilician Gates at the foot of the Taurus Mountains, which separated the region of Cilicia from the Christian Kingdom of Little Armenia.

As the cavalry advanced to reconnoitre the land, they discovered in a valley a large contingent of Turkish troops (20,000 infantry and 10,000 cavalry), who were remnants of previous defeats and were regrouped and ready to ambush the company. Once discovered, the Turks descended to the plain and both armies prepared for a great battle, the Battle of Kibistra, in the open field at Kibistra on August 15, 1304.

Despite the numerical disparity between the forces, Roger de Flor did not avoid a confrontation but put himself at the head of the cavalry. Bernat de Rocafort and Marulli did the same with the almogavars, who showed great spirit and celebrated the victory before even engaging in combat and uttering their famous war cry "Awake iron, awake!" while they hit the ground with the end of their spears. At last, the troops of the Company rushed to meet the Turkish troops, and the battle began. At first, the Turks asserted their numerical advantage, but even as the battle seemed to be swinging in favour of the Turks, the almogavars charged again and managed to breach and destroy their line. The battle continued until twilight before the remains of the Turkish army fled in disarray, chased by the almogavar cavalry almost until dawn. The almogavars spent the night with their weapons in hand and waited for a Turkish counterattack, which never occurred.

The following morning, Roger de Flor proceeded to survey the battlefield and was surprised by the magnitude of his victory. No fewer than 6,000 cavalry and 12,000 Turkish infantrymen had been killed in the battle. The almogavars then began to shout out their wish to continue the march through the Taurus mountains to Little Armenia in a surprise attack, and recover what the Byzantine Empire had lost over many centuries, but their captains judged the idea reckless.

== De Flor's murder and Catalan revenge ==
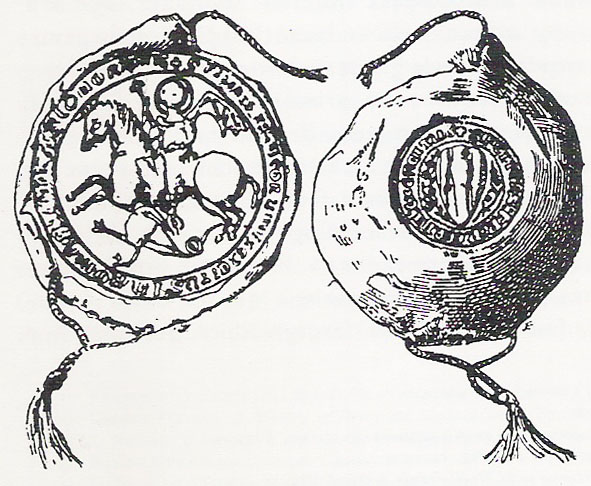
Seal of the Grand Catalan Company, c. 1305

After the important victory of Kibistra, the Company decided to return to Ania and spend the winter there as their lack of knowledge of the terrain made an advance very dangerous. During the retreat, crossing country that had been conquered by the Turks, Greek historians report numerous examples of looting, abuses and cruelty by the almogavar soldiers, worse according to them than was suffered under the Ottoman yoke.

=== Siege of Magnesia ===
Arriving at Magnesia, however, the company was informed of a terrible event. The local population, with its captain, Ataliote, at the head and with the support of the Alans, had beheaded the garrison and stolen its treasure. Informed, Roger de Flor immediately laid siege to the city.

However, the siege had to be lifted shortly afterwards by order of Andronikos, who requested the help of the company to defend the prince of Bulgaria (Roger's brother-in-law) from an uprising led by his own uncle. The historian Nicephorus Gregoras, however, claimed that the Emperor's request was a pretext to disguise the impossibility of the Company breaking the resistance of Magnesia. The 500 Alans who still remained on the side of the Company also deserted.

=== Murder of Roger de Flor and massacre of Adrianople ===
After two years of victorious campaigns against the Turks, the lack of discipline and the character of a foreign army in the heart of the Empire were seen as a growing danger, and on April 30, 1305, the Emperor's son (Michael IX Palaiologos) ordered mercenary Alans to murder Roger de Flor and exterminate the Company in Adrianople while it attended a banquet organised by the Emperor. About 100 cavalry men and 1,000 infantrymen perished.

After the murder of Roger de Flor, the local Byzantine population rose up against the Catalans in Constantinople and killed many of them, including at the main barracks. Prince Michael ensured that as many as possible were killed before news reached the main force in Gallipoli. Some, however, escaped and carried the news of the massacre to Gallipoli after which the Catalans went on a spree of their own, killing all the local Byzantines. The devastation would last in the memory of the townspeople of the area for centuries, just as the monks of Mount Athos would prohibit the entrance of Catalan citizens until 2000.

=== Siege of Gallipoli ===
Byzantine troops, made up of Greeks, Alans and Turcopolos, surrounded Gallipoli. Berenguer d'Entença, the new leader of the Company was besieged and sent ambassadors to Sicily to ask for help.

D'Entença planned a raid against Constantinople, first taking and looting the island of Propóntide and then departing for Recrea with 5 galleys, leaving in Gallipoli a garrison formed by 206 horsemen and 1,256 infantry, commanded by Ramon Muntaner (as captain of Gallipoli) and Bernat de Rocafort (as Seneschal). On the way back to Gallipoli, d'Entença's fleet ran into a larger fleet of 18 Genoese ships. D'Entança was welcomed aboard but then treacherously captured and taken to a Genoese stronghold in the area. He would later be released.

The small force left in Gallipoli nevertheless agreed to defend the site and their honour to the death and bored holes in the remaining ships to ensure there was no escape. On 21 June 1305, they sallied forth to meet the Byzantine Army and fought with such ferocity that they totally overwhelmed them and killed many thousands of the enemy for the loss of only a few men.

=== Battle of Apros ===
The Catalan Company then marched to Thrace and left a few families behind in Gallipoli. In July 1305, after three days of marching, they came across, near Apros, the Byzantine army of 6,000 cavalry and even more infantry under the Emperor's son Prince Michael.

The Catalan forces lined up in front of the Byzantine army, which included a large contingent of Alans as well as many Turcopoles. Despite the Imperial Army's numerical superiority, the Alans withdrew after the first charge, and the Turcopoles deserted en bloc to the Catalans. The Catalans inflicted heavy losses, and even Prince Michael was injured and had to leave the field, followed by his army. The Catalans had won the day but slept with weapons in hand in case of a Byzantine counterattack.

When 60 Catalan prisoners in Adrianople heard of the victory, they resolved to break out but could only climb on the roof of a tower. The local population were eventually driven to set fire to the tower in which most of the Catalans perished. Those who jumped were set upon by the crowd.

=== Dominion over Thrace ===
The Catalans proceeded to ravage Thrace for two years and were assisted by the return of Ferran Eiximenis d'Arenós with whose help they captured several towns.

=== Battle of Mount Haemus ===
The Company decided to have a showdown with a tribal group known as the Magasetas, who were based in the vicinity of Mount Haemus and had been involved in the murder of Roger de Flor. They withdrew troops in preparation from the various towns of Thrace such as Pacia, Modico and Rodesto which they had been occupying. Leaving a garrison in Gallipoli to look after the women and their possessions the main bulk of the Catalans set off in search of the Magasetas. After several days, the Catalans located them and counted 3,000 cavalry and 6,000 infantry plus their baggage train.

The battle took place next day on a plain at the foot of the Mount Haemus where the Magasetas made a defensive wall of their wagons. Once again, the superior Catalan cavalry and infantry overwhelmed the enemy, killing their general Gregorio. Of the 9,000 fighting men of the Magasetas, only 300 survived. The women and children tried in vain to escape on tired horses.

== Internal confrontations and the end of the Company ==
Coat of arms of the Duchy of Neopatria

=== Internal division ===
Subsequently, the Catalan Company suffered a period of internal confrontation provoked by the disputes and interests of foreign powers eager to control it. Thus Frederic III of Sicily assigned Crown Prince Ferdinand of Majorca to Gallipoli as captain of the company. The move was contested by Bernat de Rocafort, and others such as Berenguer d'Entença and Ferran Eiximenis d'Arenós accepted the appointment. The fight ended with the departure of Ferran and the Prince and the death of Entença, which left Bernat de Rocafort as head of the Company. The administrator Ramon Muntaner also would leave the Company and later write a chronicle about its history.

After this period of internal struggle, Bernat de Rocafort offered the services of the company to Charles of Valois to strengthen his aspirations to the Byzantine Empire. In 1309, Thibault de Chepoy, the representative of Charles of Valois, ordered the arrest of Bernat de Rocafort and sent him to Naples, where he would starve to death the same year.

=== Move into southern Greece ===
By 1308, the resources of the Gallipoli peninsula were exhausted and the company headed westwards towards southern Greece, reestablishing themselves on the peninsula of Kassandra in Chalcidice. From there, they attacked and pillaged the locality, including Mount Athos Monastery. Unable to capture Thessalonica, they moved further west and south and by 1309 reached the region of Thessaly, in what is now Central Greece.

=== Battle of Halmyros ===
In 1310, the new leader of the Company Roger Deslaur offered his services to Walter V of Brienne, Duke of Athens, and cleared the duchy of all his enemies in less than a year. The Duke, however, did not pay the amount agreed upon for their services, which unleashed the wrath of the company. The Company decided to declare war on the duke and met him at the Battle of Halmyros on March 15, 1311. The battle itself was a decisive last victory for the Catalans, despite being outnumbered by the Frankish forces of Athens, which included 700 knights. Walter V and most of his knights were killed, which left Athens at the mercy of the Company.

=== Duchies of Athens and Neopatras ===
In a short space of time, the Company not only assumed the control of the Duchy of Athens but extended its dominions to the city of Thebes and the region of Thessaly, converting the latter into the Duchy of Neopatras, where they established themselves as feudal lords. In 1312, they accepted the overlordship of the Aragonese crown of Sicily and adopted a new seal bearing the head of St George. As a consequence of their taking possession of the duchies in the name of the Crown of Aragon and refusing to return them to their legitimate heirs, the Pope demanded the Company return the territory and excommunicated its members in 1318 after they declined.

Both duchies remained in the hands of the Great Company as vassals of the Crown of Aragon until 1388–1390, when they were defeated by the Navarrese Company, commanded by Pedro de San Superano, Juan de Urtubia and the Florentine troops of Nerio I Acciaioli of Corinth. The descendants of the latter then controlled the duchies until 1456, when they were conquered by the Ottoman Empire. By then, the Catalan Company had ceased to exist.

== See also ==
- Catalan campaign in Asia Minor
- Principality of Catalonia
- Prince Salvador
- Mercenaries of the ancient Iberian Peninsula

== Bibliography ==
- Francisco de Moncada; Samuel Gili Gaya (1623). Expedicion de los catalanes y aragoneses contra turcos y griegos. L. Deu.
  - Moncada, Francesc (1777). Expedition of the Catalans and Aragonese against Turkish and Greeks.
  - The Catalan Chronicle of Francisco de Moncada.
  - Moncada, Francesc (1828). Expédition des Catalans et des Arragonais contre les Turcs et les Grecs (in French). C.J. Trouvé.
- Muntaner, Ramón (1562). Chronica, o descripcio dels fets, e hazanyes del inclyt rey don Iaume primer rey Darago, de Mallorques, e de Valencia... Feta per lo Magnifich en Ramon Muntaner... en casa de Iaume Cortey librater. pp. 359–.
  - Jepús, J. (1860). Crónica catalana de Ramón Muntaner: texto original... J. Jepús. pp. 416–.
  - Lady Goodenough (2000). Chronicle of Muntaner (PDF). Publications-Cambridge-Ontario.
  - Lady Goodenough (1920). Chronicle of Muntaner. Hakluyt Society – Vol. 1.
  - Lady Goodenough (1921). Chronicle of Muntaner. Hakluyt Society – Vol.2.
- Kanellopoulos, Nikolaos S.; Lekea, Ioanna K. (2014). "Prelude to Kephissos (1311): An Analysis of the Battle of Apros (1305)". Journal of Medieval Military History. XII. Woodbridge: The Boydell Press: 119–137. ISBN 978-1-84383-936-1. ISSN 1477-545X.
- Setton, Kenneth M. (1975). Catalan Domination of Athens 1311–1380. Variorum: London.
- Setton, Kenneth M.; Hazard, Harry W., eds. (1975). A History of the Crusades, Volume III: The Fourteenth and Fifteenth Centuries. Vol. 3. Madison and London: University of Wisconsin Press. ISBN 0-299-06670-3.
- Torró, Josep (2018). "Partners-in-Arms. Medieval Military Associations: From the Iberian cabalgada to the American entrada". In Glick, Thomas F.; Malpica, Antonio; Retamero, Félix; Torró, Josep (eds.). From Al-Andalus to the Americas (13th–17th Centuries). Leiden: Brill. ISBN 978-90-04-36332-8.
- Catalan Company (1302–1388 AD), by David Kuijt and Chris Brantley
- History (14th century). Aragon
