= Roger de Flor =

Italian military adventurer and condottiere (c. 1267-1305)

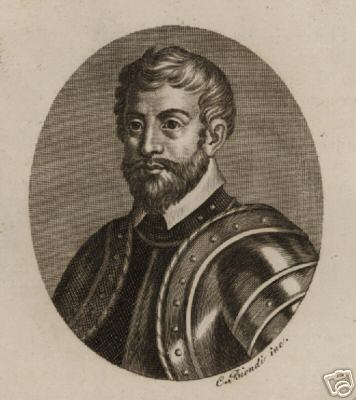
- 19th century engraving
- Born: c. 1267; Brindisi, Kingdom of Sicily (modern-day Italy)
- Died: 30 April 1305 (aged 37–38); Adrianople, Byzantine Empire (modern-day Edirne, Turkey)
- Military career
- Allegiance: Crown of Aragon; Catalan Company
- Service years: 1282–1305

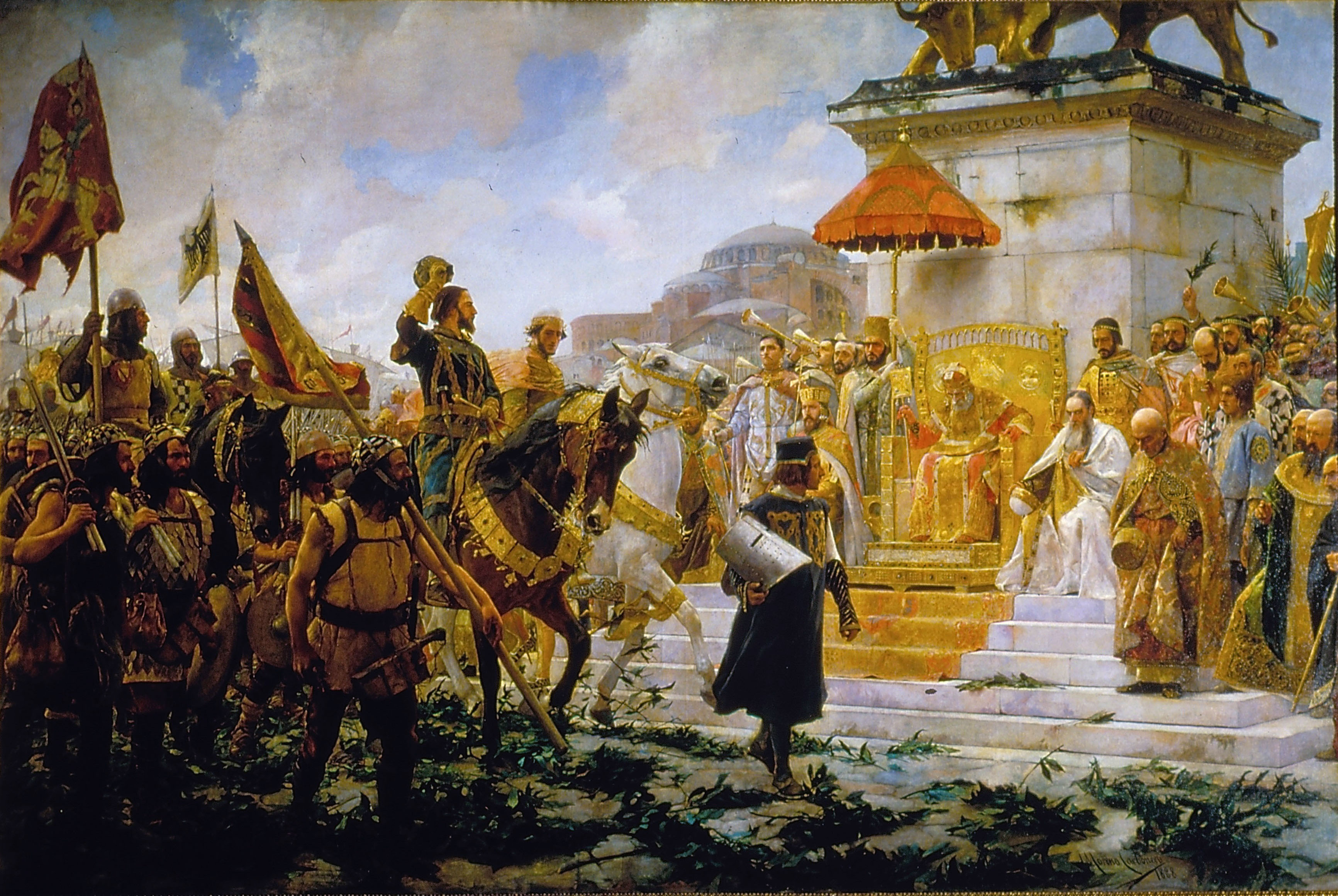
Entry of Roger de Flor in Constantinople by José Moreno Carbonero, 1888

Roger de Flor (Eastern Catalan pronunciation: [ruˈʒe ðə ˈflɔ, ro-], Western Catalan pronunciation: [roˈdʒeɾ ðe ˈflɔɾ], c. 1267 – 30 April 1305), also known as Ruggero/Ruggiero da Fiore or Rutger von Blum or Ruggero Flores, was an Italian military adventurer and condottiere active in Aragonese Sicily, Italy, and the Byzantine Empire. He was the commander of the Great Catalan Company and held the title Count of Malta.

== Biography ==
Roger de Flor was born in Brindisi in the Kingdom of Sicily, the second son of an Italian noblewoman of Brindisi and a German falconer named Richard von Blum (Blume means flower in German) in the service of Emperor Frederick II. Richard von Blum was killed fighting at the Battle of Tagliacozzo in 1268.

At eight years old Roger de Flor was sent to sea in a galley belonging to the Knights Templars. He entered the order and became captain of a galley called "El falcó". After rescuing wealthy survivors during the siege of Acre by the Mamluk Sultan Al-Ashraf Khalil in 1291, he went to Cyprus. Following intrigues and personal disputes he was accused of robbery and denounced by the Pope Boniface VIII as a thief and an apostate. This resulted in his relegation from the order. Roger fled to Genoa, where he borrowed a considerable sum from Ticino Doria, purchased a new vessel, and began a career in piracy.

The struggle between the Aragonese kings of Aragon and the French kings of Naples for the possession of Sicily was in progress at that time and Roger, by then one of the most experienced military commanders of his time, was called to the service of Frederick, King of Sicily, who gave him the rank of vice-admiral. Roger conducted a series of effective naval raids with his fleet of privateers, striking at Angevin, Aragonese, and French shipping. In 1301 a flotilla of supply ships under his command was vital to lifting the second siege of Messina.

When the Peace of Caltabellotta brought the war to an end in 1302, Frederick was unwilling and unable to keep a mercenary army and was anxious to free the island from troops (called "Almogavars"), whom he no longer had the means of paying. Given the political and military situation, Roger found an opportunity to make his services useful in the East fighting the Ottoman Turks, who were ravaging the Byzantine Empire.

Emperor Andronicus II Palaeologus of the Byzantine Empire was facing siege by the Ottoman Turks, an Islamic Beylic approaching the capital of his empire after defeating his armies and ransacking most of his domains. Looking for assistance from the European kingdoms, Andronicus II made Roger an offer of service along with the Almogavar army under his command. In September 1302, Roger with his fleet and army, now known as the Catalan Company, 6,500 strong, arrived at Constantinople. He was adopted into the imperial family, married to the emperor's niece Maria Asenina (daughter of Ivan Asen III of Bulgaria and Irene Palaiologina), and made grand duke (megas doux) and commander-in-chief of the army and the fleet.

Facing strong opposition from the powerful Genoese, some weeks passed lost in dissipation, intrigues, and bloody quarrels against the Genoese who were intent on keeping him out of the circles of power. Roger and his men were sent into Asia, and reportedly beat the Turks back as far as Armenia and Iran. After these successful encounters with the Turks, Roger and his army went into winter quarters at Cyzicus. In May 1304 they again took the field, defeated the Turks at Germe along with Byzantine forces under Hranislav and rendered the important service of relieving Philadelphia, then invested and reduced to extremities by the Turks. Given his position of unchallenged military power, he was accused of serving his own interest instead of those of the emperor because he was determined to create a principality in the East for himself. He sent his treasures to Magnesia, but the people slew his Catalans and seized the treasures. He then laid siege to the town, but his attacks were repulsed, and he was compelled to retire.

Being recalled to Europe, he settled his troops in Gallipoli and other towns, and visited Constantinople to demand pay for the Almogavars. Roger was created Caesar, perhaps in December 1304; other sources indicate that the date was shortly before Roger's death ("in 1305 the title of Caesar, which conferred great ceremonial status, though less real power") and even days before ("Flor being promoted kaisar in April 1305").

In April 1305, he was assassinated in Adrianople by Andronikos' son Michael IX. The Catalan Company later avenged itself, plundering from Macedonia to Thrace in what has been called the "Catalan Vengeance". (Note: The latter's reaction is known to history as the Catalan Vengeance: a two-year devastation of Thrace and a two-year devastation of Macedonia, each havoc ceasing only when very little remained for the Company or their Turk allies to ruin.)

He was fluent in Greek.

== Legacy and fiction ==
The early history of the Catalan Company was chronicled by Ramon Muntaner, a member of the company, in his Crònica.

The life of Roger de Flor inspired the fictional character of Tirant lo Blanc, an epic romance written by Joanot Martorell, published in Valencia in 1490. It is one of the best-known medieval works of literature in the Catalan language and played an important role in the evolution of the Western novel thanks to its influence on Miguel de Cervantes.

Roger de Flor is one of the main characters of The Horsemen of Death ("Surma ratsanikud"; 1963), a historical novel by Estonian writer Karl Ristikivi. Roger de Flor is the title and the main character of a historical novel by the late Greek writer and publisher Kostas Kyriazis.

Spanish poet Mariano Capdepón composed a play dealing with the last days of Roger's life. The composer Ruperto Chapí used this text for his opera Roger de Flor (1878).

He is also shown in Kuruluş: Osman, played by an unknown actor.

One of the units of the Paratrooper Brigade of Spain is named after him.

== General references ==
- Ernest Marcos Hierro, Almogàvers: la història, L'esfera dels llibres, Barcelona 2005.
- Francisco de Moncada, Catalan Chronicle.
