= List of Spanish Armed Forces unit mottoes =

The Spanish Armed Forces have a number of mottoes that show the spirit and virtues of the units that form them.

The motto of the Armed Forces, common yet unofficial, is Todo por la patria (Spanish for "Everything for the Fatherland").

Notice that it is not required that the units listed here keep active, only their belonging to the Spanish Armed Forces. All mottoes are in Spanish if not specified otherwise.

== Estado Mayor de la Defensa (EMAD) (Military Joint Staff) ==
- Operations Command (MOPS): Custodiae pacis – we are the custodians of peace (Latin)
- Joint Cyberdefence Command (MCCD): Lealtad y Constancia – Ingenio y Destreza – Loyalty and Constancy – Ingenuity and Skill
- Military Emergencies Unit (UME): Perseverando para servir – Persevering to serve
- Royal Guard (GR): Al servicio de la Corona – In the service of the Crown
  - “Plus Ultra” Squadron: Valor, honor, lealtad – Valor, honor, loyalty

== Spanish Navy ==
- Maritime Action Forces (FAN)
  - 1st Naval Action Group
    - Patiño (A-14): Non veni ministrari sed ministrare – Do not aspire to be served, but to serve (Latin)
    - 31st Scout Squadron
      - Asturias (F-74): Hoc signo vincitur inimicus – With this emblem the enemy is defeated (Latin)
      - Álvaro de Bazán (F-101): Rey servido y patria honrada - King served and homeland honored
      - Blas de Lezo (F-103): Ornatus mei arma sunt requies mea pugnare – My harnesses are my weapons, fight is my rest (Latin)
    - 41st Scout Squadron
      - Santa María (F-81): Descubrir o morir en la demanda - To discover or to die in the try
      - Victoria (F-82): Primus circumdedisti me – You were the first to circumnavigate me (referencing Juan Sebastián Elcano) (Latin)
      - Numancia (F-83): Entusiasmo, valor, decisión - Enthusiasm, courage, decision
      - Navarra (F-85): Ex hostibus et in hostes – From the enemy and to the enemy (Latin)
      - Canarias (F-86): Siempre dispuesta - Always ready
  - 2nd Naval Action Group
    - Príncipe de Asturias (R-11): Hoc signo vincitur inimicus - With this emblem the enemy is defeated (Latin)
      - CTA PA Príncipe de Asturias (Air Traffic Control?): (Note: Dubious information or translation) Siempre vigilantes - Always on the watch
- Maritime Action Forces (FAM)
  - Juan Sebastián Elcano (A-71): Primus circumdedisti me – You were the first to circumnavigate me (referencing Juan Sebastián Elcano) (Latin)
  - Mar Caribe (A-101): Tu regere imperio fluctus Hispania memento – Remember, Spain, that you ruled the empire of the seas (Latin)
  - Alerta (A-111): Quisquam in quo confidere - Trust nobody?
  - Meteoro (P-41): Ad eundum quo nemo ante iit -To boldly go where no man has gone before (Latin)
  - Rayo (P-42): Fulgura iecit et conturbavit eos – And threw to them a thunderbolt (Latin)
  - Atalaya (P-74): Dispositio et provideo – I dispose and provide (Latin)
- Spanish Navy Marines: Valientes por tierra y por mar - Bravery in land and in the sea
  - Navy Tercio (TEAR): Valientes por tierra y por mar - Bravery in land and in the sea
    - 1st Landing Battalion (BD-I): Quia nominor leo – Because my name is lion (Latin)
  - Navy Protection Forces (FUPRO): Por tierra y por mar - By land and sea
  - Fuerza de Guerra Naval Especial (FGNE): Serenitas et audacia – Serenity and courage (Latin)
  - Unidad de Operaciones Especiales (UOE): En la UOE no entra quien quiere, sino quien puede, somos especiales - In the UOE doesn't enter who wants, but who cans, we're special
- Naval Aircraft Flotilla (FLOAN)
  - 1st Squadron: A todos enseñé a volar - I taught everybody how to fly
  - 3rd Squadron: In maribus serviam – In the sea we serve (Latin)
  - 4th Squadron: Omnia vincula disrumpam – All the bonds broken (Latin)
  - 5th Squadron: No hay quinta mala - There is not a bad fifth
  - 8th Squadron: Per aspera ad astra – Through hardships to the stars (Latin)
  - 9th Squadron: Supra mare et terram – Over land and sea (Latin)
  - 10th Squadron: Nos ad nostrum - Us to ours (Latin)
  - Rescue Swimmers: Vivo o muerto, te vienes con nosotros - Dead or alive, you come with us
- Submarine Flotilla (FLOSUB): Ad utrumque paratus – Ready for either alternative (Latin)
- Personnel Command (JEPER): Valor gentium – The valor of the people (Latin)

== Spanish Air and Space Force: Per aspera ad astra – Through hardships to the stars (unofficial) ==
- General Headquarters of the Air and Space Force (CGEA)
  - Spanish Air and Space Force Chief of Staff
    - Security and Protection of the Force Direction (DSPF): Parati et sempre vigilantes – Ready, and always vigilant (Latin)
  - Group of the Air and Space Force Headquarters
    - Automobile Squadron of the Group of the Air and Space Force Headquarters: Age quod agis! – Do not distract! (Latin)
    - Security Group (GRUSEG)
      - Spanish Air and Space Force Honour Squadron (EDHEA): Nosce te ipsum - Know thyself (Latin)
- Air and Space Force
  - Air Combat Command: Adsumus custodes pacis – I assume the custody of peace (Latin)
    - 11th Wing (fighter and anti-submarine warfare wing): Vista, suerte y al toro - Sight, luck and to the bull
      - 111th Squadron: Excrementa edit iacet semel pro anno et tamen irridet – Eats waste, rests one time a year, and yet it scoffes (Latin)
    - 12th Wing (fighter wing): No le busques tres pies - Do not search three feet in it (in reference to the unit emblem, the cat, and the popular Spanish saying No le busques tres pies al gato [Do not search three feet to the cat], which means to not try to proof the impossible)
      - 122nd Squadron: De lo dicho, ¡nada! - About what we said, nothing!
      - 123rd Squadron: Mille ambulat oculis – Walk(s) cautiously (Latin)
      - SCO (Squadron Commander?) - Sí o sí... moja - One way or the other... (he/she) wets
    - 14th Wing (fighter wing)
      - 141st Escuadrón: ...pero yo prefiero serlo - ...but I'd rather to be it
    - 15th Wing (fighter wing): Quien ose, paga – Who dares, pays
      - 151st Squadron: Cara a cara - Face to face
      - 152nd Squadron: Mars vigila - Mars watches (Latin)
      - 153rd Squadron: No semos naide [sic] – We ain't nobody (The Spanish version has intentional orthography mistakes)
      - Maintenance Squadron: Todo es posible – Everything is possible
    - 31st Wing (airlift and aerial refueling wing): Lo que sea, donde sea, y cuando sea – Whatever, wherever and whenever
    - 37th Wing (strategic airlift wing)
      - 371st Squadron: Donde estén y como estén - Wherever they are and however they are
    - 47th Mixed Group of the Air Force (electronic warfare and aerial refueling group): Mobilis in mobili - Moving within the moving element (referencing the Nautilus in the 1870 Jules Verne novel Twenty Thousand Leagues Under the Seas) (Latin)
      - 471st Squadron: Más tiempo, más rápido, más preciso - More time, faster, more precise
    - Leadship of the Search and Rescue Service (JESAR): Vade et tu fac similiter – Go and do the same (referencing the parable of the Good Samaritan) (Latin)
    - Leadship of the Command and Control System (JSMC): Sciencia fortitunis servitudini - Science at the service of the force (Latin)
      - Air Control Mobile Group (GRUMOCA): Siempre dispuestos - Always ready
      - Air Control North Group (GRUNOMAC): No estás solo - You're not alone
      - Operational Air Circulation Group (GRUCAO): Recto itinere. Quid quaeris amplius? – Through the straight path. What else do you want? (Latin)
      - Operational Air Circulation Squadron of Madrid (ECAO Madrid – ECAO 1): Sin problemas - Without trouble
      - Operational Air Circulation Squadron of Sevilla (ECAO Sevilla – ECAO 2): Ver, oír y... controlar - To see, to hear and... to control
      - 1st Air Surveillance Squadron (EVA 1) and Air Quartering El Frasno: No hay mejor - There's no best
      - 2nd Air Surveillance Squadron (EVA 2) and Air Quartering Villatobas: Matador
      - 3rd Air Surveillance Squadron (EVA 3) and Air Quartering Constantina: Mirando al sur - Looking south
      - 4th Air Surveillance Squadron (EVA 4) and Air Quartering Rosas: Ser o no ser - To be or not to be
      - 5th Air Surveillance Squadron (EVA 5) and Air Quartering Aitana: Siempre vigilantes - Always vigilant
      - 7th Air Surveillance Squadron (EVA 7) and Air Quartering Puig Major: No más allá - No further
      - 12th Air Surveillance Squadron (EVA 12) and Air Quartering Espinosa de los Monteros: Donde nadie está, estamos nosotros – Where nobody stands, we are
      - 13th Air Surveillance Squadron (EVA 13) and Air Quartering Sierra Espuña: Nos la jugamos - We gamble it
      - 22nd Air Surveillance Squadron (EVA 22): Siroco - Sirocco
    - Leadship of Air Mobility (JMOVA): Más y más lejos - Further and further
    - Paratrooper Sappers Squadron (EZAPAC): Sólo merece vivir quién por un noble ideal está dispuesto a morir - Only deserves to live who is ready to die for a noble dream
    - Support Squadron for Air Deployment (EADA): Obviam primus - The first to arrive (Latin)
    - Second Support Squadron for Air Deployment (SEADA): Nulli secundus – Second to none (Latin)
    - Medical Air Evacuation Unit (UMAER): Por el cielo siempre a tiempo - Through the sky, always on time
    - Support Medical Unit for Air Deployment (UMAAD-Zaragoza): A pie de pista - At runway level
  - General Air Warfare Command
    - 23rd Wing (fighter training wing): La calidad del aparato importa muy poco. El éxito de la misión depende del piloto que lo maneje - The aircraft quality is not important. The mission success depends on the pilot which pilots it.
    - 48th Wing (helicopter combat SAR and airlift wing): Unde veniat – From where it comes (Latin)
      - Supplies Unit: ¡Urgente no... lo siguiente! - Not urgent, really urgent!
    - 78th Wing (helicopter training wing): Lo que bien se aprende... - What is learnt well...
      - 782nd Squadron: Parar, templar... y mandar - Stopping, tempering... and commanding
    - 43rd Group of the Air Force (aerial firefighting group): ¡Apaga... y vámonos! / Donde pongo el ojo, ¡mojo! / Cuando un monte se quema... - Turn it off... and let's go! (referencing a Spanish saying meaning to prepare to go) / Where I look, I wet! (referencing another saying) / When a mountain is burnt...
      - Supplies Unit: No hay... ¡está pedido! - There's no more left, it's ordered!
      - General Secretariat: Está en la lista - It's on the list
    - 801st Squadron of the Air Force (SAR squadron): Vade et tu fac similiter - Go and do the same (referencing the parable of the Good Samaritan) (Latin)
    - Basic Flight Academy (ABA): Paso honroso – Honorable pass
    - General Flight Academy (AGA)
      - Mechanics of the General Flight Academy: Todos para uno - One for all
      - Patrulla Águila: Juncti sed non uncti - Together but not scrambled (Latin)
        - Patrulla Águila Maintenance Team: In manibus nostris est - It is in our hands (Latin)
    - School of Security, Defence and Support Technique (ETESDA): Eppur si muove – And yet it moves (referencing the phrase Galileo supposedly pronounced) (Latin)
    - Logistical Center of Armament and Experimentation (CLAEX): Oderint dum metuant – That they hate us provided they fear us (Latin)
      - Explosive Ordnance Disposal (EOD): En cualquier suerte... - Under all circumstances...
    - Logistical Center of Quartermastery (CLOIN): Dotar a la fuerza - To outfit the force
    - Transmissions Group (GRUTRA)
      - 2nd Transmissions Squadron (ESTRAM nº2): Aún cuando duermo, velo - Even when I sleep, I keep vigil
      - Air Quartering Alto de los Leones / 3rd Transmissions Squadron: Soportamos con garra - We support with claw
      - Air Quartering El Vedat / 4th Transmissions Squadron: Como arañas la cuidamos - Like spiders we care of it
    - Group of Schools of Matacán (GRUEMA): Quod natura non dat, Salmantica non praestat – What nature doesn't give, Salamanca doesn't lend it (Latin)
    - Las Bardenas Shooting Range: ¿Ha sido dentro? - Did it enter?
    - Air Quartering El Prat: Som si recolzem – We are if we support (Catalan)
    - Santiago Military Aerodrome: Apoyo al peregrino – Help to the pilgrim
    - Son Sant Joan Air Base: ...ni la envaines sin honor - ...nor sheath it without honor
    - Málaga Air Base: ...seguimos cooperando – ...we keep cooperating
    - Group of the Cuatro Vientos Air Base: Tradete mihi fulgendi locum- Give me the place of the lightnings (Latin)
    - Group of the Torrejón Air Base: Tibique quid interest - What does it matter to you? (Latin)
    - Group of the Zaragoza Air Base: No sé rendirme - I don't know how to give up (referencing what said the General Palafox in the Episodios Nacionales from Benito Pérez Galdós, to the Parliamentary of Moncey, that asked for his surrender in the Sieges of Zaragoza)
  - Canary Islands Air Command
    - 46th Wing (fighter wing): Arena, mar y viento - Sand, sea and wind
      - 462nd Squadron: Que chulo eres en el suelo / Ay si voy con lo que te doy - How cocky you're in the ground / Oh, if I come, with what I give you
      - Maintenance Squadron: Arena, mar y viento – Sand, sea and wind
    - 802nd Squadron of the Air Force (SAR squadron): Salvamento Canarias - Rescue Canary Islands
    - Lanzarote Military Aerodrome: Viento, arena, mar y fuego – Wind, sand, sea and fire
- Support to the Air Force
  - Economic Affairs Direction: Impossibilia accredimur non vero miracula- What is impossible truly does not believe in miracles? (Latin)
- Aviation Museum : Fama ex gestis – Divulging the achievements (Latin)
- Aeromodelling patrol: Con los pies en el suelo - Feet on the ground

== Spanish Army ==
- Army Headquarters
  - Information, Telecommunication and Technical Assistance Systems Headship
    - 22st Signals Regiment: Voz permanente del mando - Permanent voice of the leadership
  - 1st King's Immemorial Infantry Regiment: Levanto esta coronelía para poner el freno a los enemigos de mi corona - I set up this colonelship to put a brake to the enemies of my crown
  - Instituto de Historia y Cultura Militar: Armis historiam populorum laborant - The history of the weapons works for the peoples (Latin)
- The Force
  - NATO Rapid Deployable Spanish Corps
    - 1st Intelligence Regiment: In pace et bello perspicaces - Insightful both in peace and in war (Latin)
  - Land Force
    - "San Marcial" Division: Cañones, corazas, corazón - Cannons, shells, heart
      - 1st Brigade "Aragón": Nihil pavendum est tessera hac regali / La montaña nos une – There's no fear under the shadow of this banner (Latin) / The mountain unites us
        - 4th Armored Regiment "Pavía": Immobilis. Tecum hostes debelamus – Unshaken. We will destroy with you the enemies (Latin)
        - 64th Infantry Regiment "Galicia": Firmiter in hoc misterium fidei profitemur – Firmly professed the faith on this mystery (Latin)
        - 22nd Sappers Battalion: Seguid al zapador / Fortaleza y valor - Follow the sapper / Fortress and valor
      - 10th Brigade "Guzmán el Bueno": Sed fuertes en la guerra – Be strong in the war
        - 10th Headquarters Battalion : Leal y seguro - Loyal and safe
        - 10th Armored Regiment "Córdoba" n.º 10
          - Armored Cavalry Group "Almansa" II/10: Leo cum lilis Almansae pompa triumphi – The lion with lilies of Almansa is the pinnacle of success (Latin)
        - 10th Self-propelled Field Artillery Group: Siempre lejos fuerte - Always far and strong
        - 10th Mechanized Signals Company: Nullum silentium – There's no silence (Latin)
        - 91st Special Operations Company: Si es posible, está hecho; si es imposible... se hará - If it's possible, it's already done; if it's impossible... it will be done
      - 11th Brigade "Extremadura"I: Animosorum ducum terra – Land of brave leaders (Latin)
        - 16th Armored Regiment "Castilla"
          - Armored Cavalry Group "Calatrava" II/16: Ipsi peribunt tu autem permanebis – They will fall, but you remain (Latin)
        - 6th Infantry Regiment "Saboya": Ante ferit quam flamma micet – Hurts before the fire is seen (Latin)
          - Protected Infantry Battalion "Las Navas" II/6: Las Navas no vuelven la espalda jamás - The Navas never show their back (referencing the Battle of Navas de Tolosa)
        - 67th Infantry Regiment "Tercio Viejo de Sicilia": Valor, firmeza y constancia - Valor, firmness and constancy
        - 11th Sapper Battalion: Laborare et pugnare – To work hard and to fight (Latin)
        - 11th Logistical Group: Por el trabajo al sacrificio - Through work towards sacrifice
        - 11th Mechanized Signals Compay: Nec mille me circundantes timeo – I'm not afraid even when thousands surround me (Latin)
      - 12th Brigade "Guadarrama": Aprisa, duro, lejos - Fast, hard, far
        - 31st Infantry Regiment "Asturias": Angeli me fecerunt – Angels made me (Latin)
        - 66th Infantry Regiment "América": El benemérito de la patria - The worthy of the motherland
        - 12th Armored Cavalry Group "Villaviciosa": El león de Villaviciosa, triunfante y vengador - The lion of Villaviciosa, triumphant and avenger
        - 12th Logistic Group: Sum it possint esse / Primero los demás - We are so they can be (Latin) / First others
        - 12th Mechanized Signals Company: Lealtad y valor - Loyalty and valor
    - "Castillejos" Division
      - 2nd Legion Brigade "Rey Alfonso XIII"
        - Flag of 2nd Legion Headquarters: Vivir para servir, servir para luchar, luchar hasta morir - Living for serving, serving for fighting, fighting until dying
      - 6th Paratroopers Brigade "Almogávares": Desperta, ferro! / Triunfar o morir / Per crucem ad lucem - Awake, iron! (Catalan) / To succeed or to die / Through the cross (one) reaches the light (Latin)
        - 6th Headquarters Battalion
          - 6th Signals Company : Aquí Dios, fuerte y claro - Here God, strong and clear
        - 8th Light Armored Cavalry Regiment "Lusitania": Lusitania tessera omni armatura fortier – Lusitania's banner is stronger than all the armors (Latin)
        - 4th Infantry Paratrooper Regiment "Nápoles": El mar y la tierra - The sea and the land
        - 5th Infantry Regiment "Zaragoza": Benedictus dominus Deux Israel – God, holy owner of Israel (Latin)
        - Paratrooper Deployment Unit: A pesar de todo – Nonetheless
        - 13rd Sniper Company (probably, its location under the structure isn't clear): Desde un lugar que no ves, llegará un sonido que no oirás - From a place you cannot see, comes a sound you will not hear
      - 7th Brigade "Galicia": Del pasado honor, del presente orgullo - From past, honor; from present, pride
        - 12th Cavalry Regiment "Farnesio": Cañones, coraza, corazón / Et disipentur inimici ejus et fugiant a facie ejus – Cannons, shield, heart / To let them exit in its presence and that the enemies will be dispersed (Latin)
          - 7th Reconnaissance Cavalry Group "Santiago": Pes meus stetit in directo – My foot remains strong in the straight road (Latin)
        - 3rd Infantry Regiment "Príncipe": Santiago y Lombardía - Santiago and Lombardy
        - 7th Sappers Battalion: In labore quies – In the work, the rest (Latin)
        - 7th Signals Company: Sine conexus haud victoriam est – Without strength, there's no victory (Latin)
    - Ceuta General Command: Con este palo me basto - I have enough with this staff
      - 3rd Cavalry Regiment "Montesa": In hoc signo vinces – In this sign you will overcome (Latin)
      - 7th Engineers Regiment: Facta non verba – Facts, not words (Latin)
      - 23rd Logistic Unit: Servir para servir – Serve to serve
      - 17th Signals Company : Ingenio y grandeza - Ingenuity and greatness
    - Melilla General Command
      - 18th Headquarters Battalion: A España, servir hasta morir - To Spain, serving until dying
        - 18th Signals Company: Poder y sabiduría - Power and wisdom
      - 10th Cavalry Regiment "Alcántara": Hoec nubila tollunt obstantia sicut sol – Rides like the sun, dissipates the clouds when it passes (Latin)
      - 32nd Mixed Artillery Regiment: Ceteris subsidium semper ferendo – Always helping and supporting others (Latin)
        - Anti-aircraft Artillery Group II/32: Avis quae volat coculam – Bird that flies, to the pan (Latin)
      - 24th Logistic Unit
        - Sea Company of Melilla: Caballeros de tierra y de mar - Knights of land and sea
    - Army Airmobile Force: Sicut in coelo et in terra – On Earth as it is in Heaven (referencing the Lord's Prayer) (Latin)
      - 1st Attack Helicopter Battalion: Destruir o ser destruido - To destroy or to be destroyed
      - 2nd Emergency Helicopter Battalion: Siempre alerta - Always vigilant
      - 3rd Manoeuvre Helicopter Battalion: Vis et ungula – Power and claw (Latin)
      - 5th Transport Helicopter Battalion: Detrás de nadie - Behind nobody
    - Air Defence Command: Violati fulmina regis – The lightnings of the offended king (Latin)
      - Signals Unit: Cuidamos la red / Tejemos la red - We take care of the web / We knit the web
      - 71st Anti-aircraft Artillery Regiment: Primum in caelum – First in the sky (Latin)
        - Anti-aircraft Artillery Group II-71: Siempre dispuestos - Always ready
      - 73rd Anti-aircraft Artillery Regiment: Mare apertum, caelum clausum - Sea open, sky closed (Latin)
        - Anti-aircraft Artillery Patriot Group III/73: Más lejos, más alto, más fuerte - Further, higher, stronger
      - 74th Anti-aircraft Artillery Regiment: Semitae coeli sunt liberatae – The roads of the sky are released (Latin)
    - Engineering Command: Lealtad y valor - Loyalty and valor
      - 11th Engineering Specialties Regiment: Por el trabajo a la victoria – Through work to the victory
    - Signals Command: Per aspera ad astra – Through hardships to the stars (Latin)
      - 1st Signals Regiment: Por la excelencia a la victoria - Through excellence to the victory
      - 21st Signals Regiment: A la lealtad y el valor - To the loyalty and valor
      - 31st Signals Regiment: Nuestro enemigo es el silencio - Our enemy is silence
    - Special Operations Command (MOE): Guerrilleros - Guerrilla fighters
    - 1st NBC Defence Regiment «Valencia»: El defensor – The defender
    - 11th Cavalry Regiment "España": Sic obvia frangit – Like that it overcomes the obstacles it faces (Latin)
      - Light Armored Cavalry Group "Numancia" I/11: Primus flammis combusta quam armis Numancia victa – Numancia, before burnt by the fire than beaten by the weapons (referencing the Siege of Numantia) (Latin)
      - Light Armored Cavalry Group "Borbón" II/11: Dant soecula vires – Gives fame to the force (Latin)
    - 1st Regiment of Operations in the Information Environment (ROI 1): Dicho y Hecho - Said and done
      - Battalion of Operations in the Information Environment I/1 (GOI I/1): Cooperación, Abnegación y Sacrificio - Cooperation, Abnegation and Sacrifice
      - Battalion of Operations in the Information Environment II/1 (GOI II/1): Con la verdad me basta - The truth is enough
    - Logistic Operative Force: Labor omnia vincit - Work overcomes everything (Latin)
      - Logístics Brigade: Orgullo de servir – The pride of serving
        - 41st Logistic Support Group: Aquí estamos, ¡para servir! - Here we are, to serve!
      - Health Brigade
        - 1sr Health Group
          - Advanced Medical Post Center (EMAT 1): Por si la muerte aparece - Just if death appears
        - Field Hospital Group: Semper et ubique - Always and everywhere (Latin)
        - Health Logistic Support Group: Providere ad sanare – Provide to heal (Latin)
    - Canary Islands Command
      - 94th Anti-aircraft Artillery Regiment: Fortis sicut mons – As strong as a mountain (Latin)
      - 16th Brigade "Canarias"
        - 16th Light Armored Cavalry Group "Milán": Nada temerás - You won't fear anything
    - 23rd Herat Public Information Office: This is not my job! (English)
- Support to the Force
  - Training and Doctrine Command
    - Teaching, Instruction, Training and Evaluation Direction
      - Military teaching centers
        - General Military Academy: Si vis pacem, para bellum – If you want peace, prepare for war (Latin)
        - General NCO Basical Academy: A España servir hasta morir - To Spain, serving until dying
        - Infantry Academy: Armis doctrinaeque lux - Training with light weapons (Latin)
        - Cavalry Academy: Santiago y cierra, España - Santiago and at them, Spain
          - Cavalry Inspection: Celeriter operari studium valet – Working quickly costs study (Latin)
        - Artillery Academy: Ultima ratio regis / Todos para cada uno, y cada uno para los demás / Sapienta fidelitas fortitudo – The last reason (Latin) / One for all, and each one for the others / Knowledge, fidelity, strength (Latin)
          - Artillery Inspection: Ultima ratio regis – The last reason (Latin)
        - Engineer Academy: Nunc Minerva, postea palas - First wisdom, then war (Latin)
        - Upper Polytechnical School of the Army: Cum scientia exercitui serviam – When science will serve the army (Latin)
        - Logistics Academy: Serviam – To serve! (Latin)
          - Specialist Corps: Peritia peritis - Wisdom among wisdoms (Latin)
        - Teaching Center of the Army Airmobile Force: Docendo discitur - One learns by teaching (Latin)
        - National Training Center «San Gregorio»: Preparar para vencer - Preparing to overcome
  - Logistical Support Command
    - Logistical Centre Headship
      - Depot and Maintenance center of Signals Equipment: Serviam ut serviam – Serving for serving (Latin)
      - Depot and Maintenance center of Engineering Equipment: Laboramus et laborent – Work and workforce (Latin)
      - 1st Depot and Maintenance center of Wheel Vehicles: Aquí y ahora - Here and now
      - 2nd Depot and Maintenance center of Armored Vehicles: Pro pace et in bello semper laborans – In peace and in war, always working (Latin)

== Guardia Civil: El honor es mi divisa – Honor is my motto ==
- 5th Group: Nultus in manu aperta vivendum - Under any circumstance living in the open?(Latin)
- Swift Response Group (GAR)
  - Tactical Rescue and Response Team: Cada vida una batalla - Each life, a battle
- Special Intervention Unit of the Guardia Civil (UEI): Celeritas et subtilitas patrio – Quickness and cleverness for the motherland (Latin)
- Guardia Civil Unit in Lebanon (UGUCI L/H): Morir matando - To die killing
