= Battle of Calatrava =

Battle between Christian raiders and the Almohads in 1173 during the Reconquista

Battle of Calatrava (1173)
- Part of the Reconquista and Almohad wars in the Iberian Peninsula
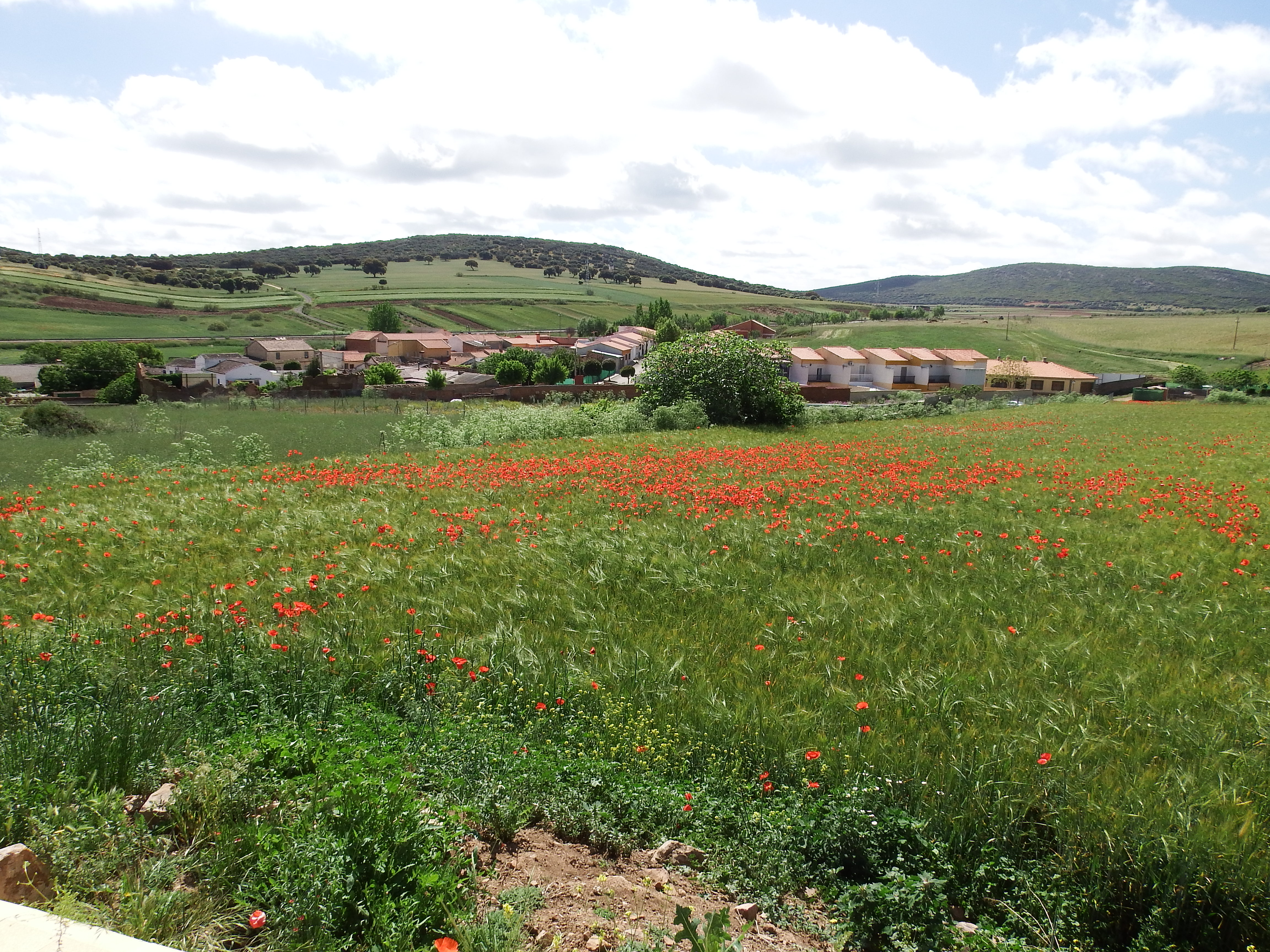
- Plains of Caracuel near Calatrava
Date	5 April 1173
Location	Caracuel de Calatrava 38°50′42.43″N 4°03′48.52″W
Result	Almohad victory

Belligerents
Militia of Ávila; Kingdom of Castile	Almohad Caliphate

Commanders and leaders
Sancho Jiménez †	Ghanim ben Muhammad; Abu Zakariya Yahya; Abu Ibrahim Ismail

Strength
Unknown	Unknown

Casualties and losses
All but 200 killed	Unknown

The Battle of Calatrava was fought on 5 April 1173 between the militia of the Castilian city of Ávila and an Almohad Caliphate army. The Castilian forces were returning from a raid into Muslim territory when they were intercepted and defeated by the Almohads on a mountainside near Calatrava.

== Background ==
In 12th-century Spain, cities in the dangerous territory between the Kingdom of Castile and the Muslim polities were granted a high degree of legal, political, and military independence. This was done by means of the city’s legal charter to encourage settlement and ensure that the cities operated as self-sufficient units with their own judicial system and military. These frontier cities included Ávila, Salamanca, Segovia, Sepúlveda, and Toledo. Each city was responsible for defending their territory and conducting raids on the Muslims.

The town-councils of these cities typically put a skilled frontiersman knowledgeable with respect to geography, border warfare, and Muslim military tactics in charge of their militias. This position was known as the Adalid or military guide/leader. In the city of Ávila, this position was held by Sancho Jiménez, an exceptionally prolific frontier leader with 25 battles to his credit. As the Adalid for Ávila, Sancho led the city’s military forces on raids into Muslim territory. In cities such as Ávila, these military forces consisted of a militia organized by the town-council consisting of mounted knights, infantry units, scouts, and livestock handlers.

Unlike an army officer, an Adalid was an entrepreneur-general, leading his fellow citizens on a risky venture for mutual profit. The Adalid held authority based on his track record of success rather than a royal commission, often leading to reckless decisions. Raids were often private business ventures organized by the town-council or the Adalid himself. The raids did not require the King’s permission, and the King was not responsible for the rescue of raiders if they got into trouble. Tactics were based on a livestock economy. The goal was to move fast, avoid pitched battles with city garrisons, and steal as much livestock as possible.

== Battle ==
In March 1173, the Abulense militia, estimated to number as many as 600-1,000 men, led by Sancho Jiménez traveled over 300 kilometers, crossed the Guadalquivir River, and raided the territory of the Almohad Caliphate in the far southern region of al-Andalus.

Rather than attack walled cities, Sancho targeted the settlements outside the cities in the surrounding countryside. In these areas, the Abulense were able to strike and seize large herds of sheep and cattle. Targeted were the areas near the cities of Córdoba and Écija as both cities were distant from Seville and major food producers in the agricultural heartland of al-Andalus.

Catching the Almohads by surprise, Sancho and the Abulense militia ravaged the territory and reportedly captured 50,000 sheep and 200 head of cattle. The claim of such a large herd of sheep is widely considered an exaggeration by chroniclers like ibn Şāhib al-Salāh done to emphasize Almohad wealth and the magnitude of the raid. Managing 50,000 sheep would have required between 100 and 200 professional shepherds and dozens of sheepdogs just to keep the flock moving in one direction. A more realistic figure taken in a rapid militia raid would have been in the low thousands.

After news of the raid reached Seville, the Almohad princes in charge of overall governance, Abu Zakariya Yahya and Abu Ibrahim Ismail, directed Ghanim ben Muhammad to assemble an army and track down the Christian raiders.

By the time that the Almohad force set out, Sancho and the Abulense militia had started their return journey home. As the militia force moved north across the plains, however, it progressed at a slow pace and was quickly caught by the faster moving Almohad army. When the Almohad vanguard was spotted near Caracuel, close to Calatrava, Sancho chose to take a defensive position on a mountainside and fight rather that abandon the stolen livestock and flee.

On the morning of 5 April, the Almohad commander, ben Muhammad, began his attack on the Abulense militia deployed on the mountainside. Ben Muhammad, however, did not order his forces to immediately charge the heights. Instead, archers and crossbowmen were deployed at the base of the slope to initiate a “hail of missiles” that would continue for several hours onto the stationary Christian lines without a good means of protecting themselves.

At the top of the hill, Sancho coordinated the defense and directed the reserves from his tent which served as a command center and rally point behind the defensive lines on the hillside. Sometime near mid-day, after a prolonged bombardment of the Abulense, the Almohad commander brought his light cavalry and infantry into the battle. The Almohad light cavalry was more adaptable and agile than the heavy cavalry of the raiders in the mountain terrain and was likely used to bypass the strongest parts of the defensive line and attack the flanks of the Christians. Then in a final attack, it is believed that the Almohad infantry led a final push up the mountain. The weakened Abulense front line quickly failed and broke.

At that point, the mountainside that was intended to aid the defense of the raiders would have become a trap with no path of escape. The Almohad advance was described as swift, forcing the Abulense to collapsed. Once the Almohads reached the summit, the fighting would have certainly overrun the camp. It was recorded at that point that Sancho Jiménez was killed at the site of his tent, beheaded by the advancing infantry of the Almohads. Of the large Christian force that had set out from Ávila, only 200 individuals managed to break through the encirclement and flee to safety.

The Abulense militia was decimated and the battle ended. The head of Sancho Jiminez along with the heads of many of his fallen comrades were taken and sent to the Caliph in Seville to be exhibited at the city’s gates. All the Abulense weaponry and horses were taken by the Almohads as spoils. All the looted material including the livestock were recovered. All the Muslim prisoners including the livestock handlers were set free.

== Aftermath ==
After the news of the victory reached Seville, celebrations were held and the victors were well greeted. Shortly thereafter, encouraged by their victory, the Almohads assembled a cavalry force of 4,000 and conducted raids into the Kingdom of Castile. In April-May, the Almohads raided settlements in the Tagus River Valley. In June, the Almohads attacked the settlements outside the city of Toledo. To prevent further intrusions, King Alfonso VIII of Castile, King Afonso I of Portugal, and Count Nuño de Lara, the Governor of Toledo, all petitioned the Almohads for a truce. A truce was put into place in July 1173. The Almohads agreed to end their raids on the Tagus River Valley and Toledo. The Christians gave the Almohads control of the Guadiana River Valley over 100 kilometers north of Córdoba..

For the Abulense, the battle was a total disaster. The defeat resulted in the annihilation of nearly their entire militia. And given that the militia was composed of "commoner knights" from the town's leading families, the loss of hundreds of men in a single afternoon was a devastating blow to Ávila’s local leadership and economy. The annihilation of the Abulense militia also eliminated the primary military force responsible for policing the border regions south of Toledo.

The destruction of the Abulense militia also impacted the stability of the Kingdom for years. After the battle, there were not enough men from Ávila available to patrol the frontier territory or man the local forts. Numerous fortresses that guarded the primary roads and mountain passes including Malagón, Benavente, and Calatrava were either abandoned or surrendered, effectively opening the way to Toledo for the Almohads.

This forced the Kingdom to shift its defense away from town-council militias to professional military orders, such as the newly formed Order of Calatrava. This change also had the benefit of providing full-time, permanent coverage rather than intermittent policing. In addition, the defeat brought about changes to Castile’s offensive tactics. The independent “Adalid" style of raiding was ended and gave way to a more organized, state-led offense utilizing the state’s army to capture and hold territory using siege engines and infantry support.
