= Sancho Jiménez =

Sancho Jiménez, Sancho Jimeno o Sancho Ximeno (died 1173), nicknamed 'Hunchback' (El Giboso) by Christians and Abū-Barda’a by Muslims, was a militia leader in 12th-century Iberia. Captain of the militias of Ávila, he distinguished by his unrelentless attacks and plundering expeditions in Muslim-controlled territory.

Sancho Jiménez participated in at least 25 battles between 1140 and his death in 1173. The official Almohad chronicler, Ibn Şāhib al-Salāh, said of him that "he made the Muslims drink a bitter cup of suffering", although the Almohad historian also described him as a "courageous and tireless leader". These plundering expeditions by Christian town councils were typically led by local leaders and consisted of reduced contingent of cavalry, that—if successful—obtained the likes of cattle and slaves as booty. His figure has been sometimes likened to that of a successor to Muño Alfonso, governor of Toledo who also came to lead the militias of Ávila.

Between 1157 and 1158 a party led by Sancho Jiménez raided the territory around Seville. In 1173 in the battle of Calatrava, he was defeated at the hands of an Almohad party led by Ghanim ben Muhammad and his brother Hilăl in the vicinity of Caracuel. He was returning from a razzia carried out in territories controlled by Seville, in which the Ávila militias had reportedly obtained a booty of 50,000 sheep, 1,200 cows and 150 Moorish slaves. His chopped-off head was ensuingly sent to Seville on 5 April 1173, to be exhibited at the city gates.
