= Adalid =

Adalid ("champion"; Arabic, dalíl (دليل), means "guide") was a military officer rank in Castile. The position, second to the commander, was akin to that of captain.

== History ==
It is not clear when the rank or term was established. It is mentioned in a ballad at the time of King Ramiro of León (900–951). By the time of John II of Castile (1405–1454), the rank of adalid was gone, but the term was in use as an honorary title.

== Requirements ==
An adalid had to be wise, courageous, loyal, and possess common sense. Another prerequisite for holding the privileged post of adalid was that the candidate must have achieved the status of "almogavar de caballo" (Almogavar knight), in accordance with the Fuero sobre elfecho de las cavalgadas. When a king or a lord wanted to create an adalid, he brought together twelve adalides who made the selection. If twelve adalides could not be found, then a tales de circumstantibus was established, adding men who had proved themselves in war. According to King Alonso (1221–1284), "It was advised in ancient times that they were to have the qualities before mentioned... in order to be able to guide the troops and armies in time of war, ... therefore they were called Adalides, which is equivalent to guides."

== Responsibilities ==
Adalides were required to know their men, the regional terrain, and military tactics. They had to be skilled in provisioning, establishing camps, foraging for wood and food, exercising authority, and developing military intelligence. They served both in the Castilian guard and in the Aragon geneta; they were personal guards within royal households, and fourteenth century leaders of the Almogavars. Similar to knights, they held the same social status, and incurred the same right and punishments. Adalides were horsemen, and they selected Almocadenes, who were non-officer leaders of the infantry. It was the duty of the adalides and almocadenes to defend the faith, the king, and the land.
