= Border of Granada =

Kingdom of Granada

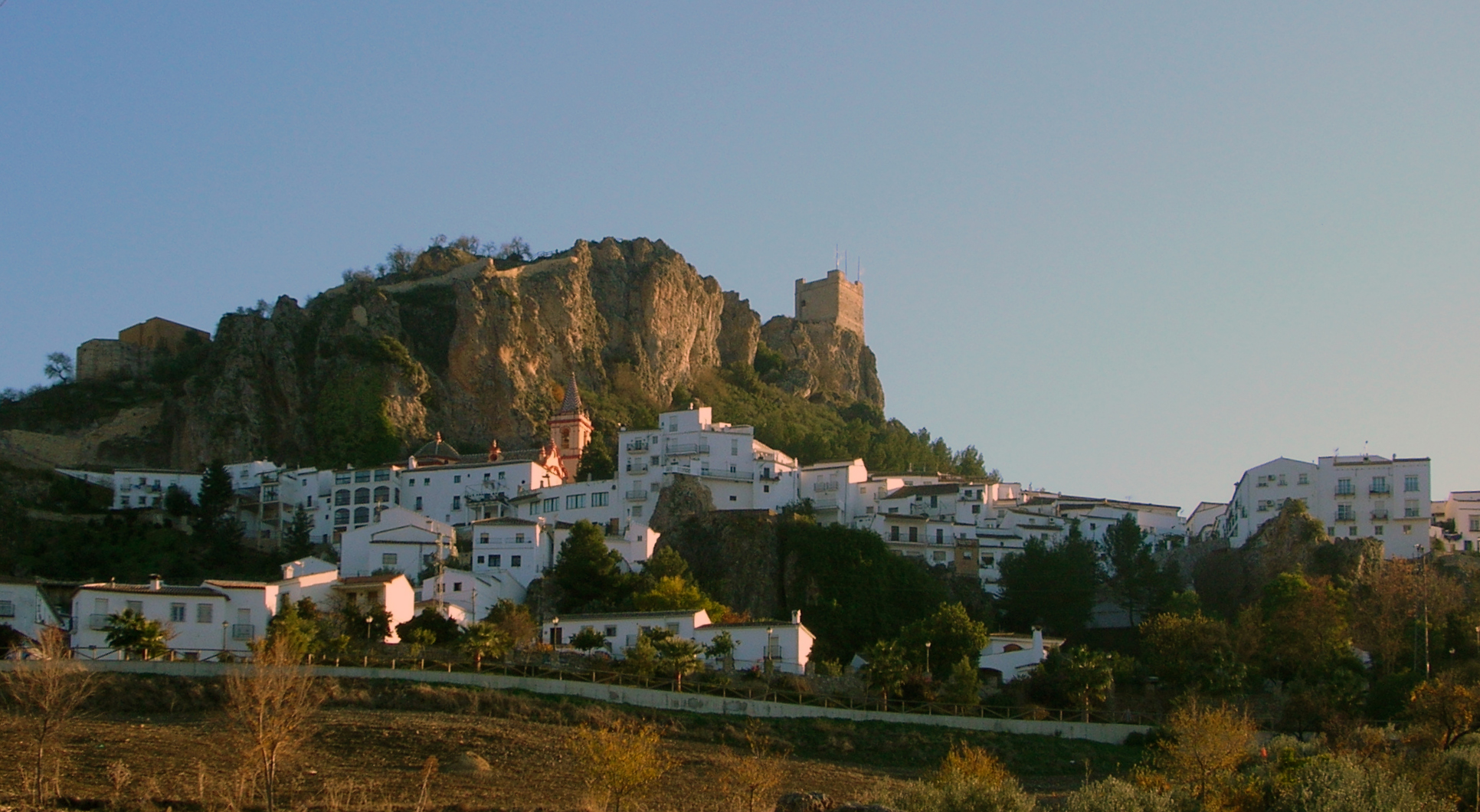
Zahara de la Sierra, town of the Sierra de Cádiz, conquered by Castille in 1407.

The border of Granada (frontera de Granada in Spanish) was a border region that existed between the Nasrid kingdom of Granada and the kingdoms of Murcia, Jaén, Córdoba and Seville following the integration of those former Muslim territories within the Crown of Castile in the mid-13th century. The delineation of this border region underwent several changes subsequently, but on the death of Alfonso XI in 1350, the Granadine border was fixed geographically, in general terms, until the beginning of the Granada War in the late 15th century. This territory was also referred to as La Banda Morisca (The Moorish Strip).

== Toponymy ==
Several modern place names survive that relate to the frontier between Granada and Christian Andalusia and the communities established on the Castilian side of the border. Thus, in the province of Cadiz there are the municipalities of Arcos de la Frontera, Castellar de la Frontera, Chiclana de la Frontera, Conil de la Frontera, Jerez de la Frontera, Jimena de la Frontera and Vejer de la Frontera; in the province of Malaga, Cortes de la Frontera; in the province of Cordoba, Aguilar de la Frontera and in the province of Sevilla, Morón de la Frontera.

There are other municipalities in the Huelva province, which include "de la Frontera" in their names. However, these do not refer to the Border of Granada border, but to the border with Portugal. This is the case with Rosal de la Frontera and Palos de la Frontera.

== Delineation ==
The first frontier was defined by the Pact of Jaén in 1246 between Muhammad I "ibn al-Ahmar", first king of Granada, and King Fernando III 'El Santo', following extensive conquests by the latter in the valley of the Guadalquivir. The border then went through modifications during the reigns of Sancho IV, Fernando IV and Alfonso XI. However, following the death of Alfonso XI in 1350, the border of Granada underwent a process of stabilization and delineation, which lasted until the War of Granada at the end of the 15th century. The line of the border ran from a point on the Strait of Gibraltar, between the mouths of the Rio Palmones and the Rio Guadarranque climbing northwards through the Sierra de Montecoche until it arrived at the Guadalete River. At that point, it veered eastwards, running parallel to the northern foothills of the Serranía de Ronda. From the Guadalteba and Yeguas rivers, the border took a north-west direction, with some variations, running through the mountains south of Benameji, Rute, Priego de Cordoba and Alcala la Real. It continued along the valley of the Guadalbullon River up to the heights of the Sierra Magina. Continuing northeast, it skirted the foothills of Sierra de Cazorla and Sierra de Segura, entering Murcian territory, where, in the districts of Caravaca and Lorca, a thick forest acted as a buffer zone. All the territory of Alicante and Orihuela, including the southern portion of the Kingdom of Valencia, from Alcoy and Cocentaina to the sea, formed a border area as well.

== Implications ==
During its existence, the border had a great territorial, political, economical, religious and cultural importance. Beyond being a border like so many others, it was for more than two centuries the European boundary between Christianity and Islam. It was, therefore, a place of strong exchange that allowed for legal and illegal economic activities, like trade with Oriental products or military raids aimed at the mere pursuit of plunder, and taking of hostages to support the slave trade, or simply to negotiate the release of the captives. In this respect, religious orders took sides.

The characteristics of this area caused kings to grant many rights and privileges to border towns in order to improve the attractiveness of life in those places, for even in times of peace there was a permanent risk of being caught or dying due to Grenadines frequent raids. The society of the frontier populations was characterized by isolation from other regions, derived from a position adjacent to the enemy and therefore by fundamental characteristics based on military activity, which explained the concerns of councils counting on those with the economic capacity to maintain horses and weapons, in addition the infantry formed the majority of the army, and also opportunists who arrived to smuggle goods across the other side of the border, and even those convicted of violent crimes who sought to redeem themselves and avoid punishment by serving the mighty. The settlements were established through a number of fortified cores, close together, with limited extension and a scarce density of population, and with only military functions that were above all else defensive.

The primary economic activity was ranching, due to the lack of population and, therefore, a scarcity of farmhands, in addition to the insecurity of the entire terrain. Therefore, the basic economic wealth of the frontier populations was through the activity of ranching, as livestock, especially sheep and goats that could be transported and secured behind the walls of fortresses and cities in case of a Moorish attack.

Among the main involvements, the creation of the military appointment of Adelantado Mayor de la Frontera (Major Governor of the Border) stands out, which kept the spirit of Christian crusades and Islamic Jihad alive in both territories, as well as the chivalrous ideal, already anachronistic in other European territories, with a true irredentism growing from the 15th century which had as its final objective, the finalisation of the Reconquista and the recuperation of the territory which used to constitute the Visigothic Kingdom of Toledo.

== Border romances ==
In the artistic and cultural field, the border romances, moniker from Ramón Menéndez Pidal, may be one of the most brilliant aspects produced by this contact between civilizations. Those ballads poeticize some historical events, like the capture of significant cities of the kingdom (Antequera, Álora, Alhama, etc.) which constitute the prelude to the Capture of Granada. At the same time, the frontier ballads tell of other armed events that produced the frontier, like the flight and sorrows of the knights. Its origin seems to be found in the medieval chanson de geste, popularized since the 14th century by minstrels, who helped its spreading in the cities and villages of Spain. That way, the frontier was a key element in the formation of the vision of Islam in all of Spain.

== The border after the Reconquista ==
After its conquest, the Kingdom of Granada kept its specificity, even in financial matters. For instance, the customs of the tax and partial tax on the old frontier with Andalucia and with Murcia were maintained, at least in that they took the Granadan silk.

== See also ==
- Kingdom of Granada
- Reconquista
- Almogavars
- Ballestero de monte
- Granada War
- Andalusia

== Bibliography ==
- Castillo Cáceres, Fernando (1999). «La funcionalidad de un espacio: la frontera granadina en el siglo XV». Espacio, tiempo y forma. Serie III, Historia medieval 12: pp. 47–64. ISSN 0214-9745.
- García Fernández, Manuel (1987). «La frontera de Granada a mediados del siglo XIV». Revista de Estudios Andaluces 9: pp. 69–86.
- Martínez Iniesta, Bautista (2003). «Los romances fronterizos: Crónica poética de la Reconquista Granadina y Antología del Romancero fronterizo».
- Mata de Carriazo, Juan (1971). En la frontera de Granada. Universidad de Sevilla. pp. 671
