= Ballestero de monte =

The Ballestero de Monte (mountain crossbowman) or Fiel de rastro (marksman of the trail), was a member of a body which provided vigilance in the mountains of Murcia, Lorca, Cartagena and Orihuela as well pursuing bandits from the Kingdom of Granada when they attacked. These groups operated between the 13th and 15th centuries.

== Functions ==
=== Monitoring the mountains ===
Their primary function was to patrol the communal grassland and mountainous areas of the Kingdom of Murcia. These patrols were designed to control illegal logging, grain harvesting, fires and charcoal production. They were prohibited from engaging in these activities as well as preventing others from doing them. They faced penalties if they failed, resulting in damage being done to the lands of Cartagena.

=== Search and pursuit of criminals ===
Their knowledge of the terrain and tracking skill led to their secondary function which was to hunt down Moorish looters who seized travelers on the road in order to obtain plunder are prisoners for ransom.

== Requirements ==
Membership in this group required three basic criteria: good physical condition; knowledge of the terrain; and tracking skill. On 24 January 1385, their efficiency led King Juan I of Castile, upon request from the Council of Murcia, to stipulate that they were to be exempted from paying taxes. His declaration stated, in part, "Since in that land there are men who know how to follow the trails of those from the land of the Moors who enter to hurt and damage our kings were it not for the mountain crossbowman...we have by good and it is to our favour that there are in that location, six mountain crossbowmen, to follow the said trails and that they be relieved of money for ever."

Because of the dangerous working conditions and high physical demands, the active life of ballesteros was short, due to either retirement or premature death. Therefore, a system of generational rotation was employed to ensure new young men could be trained and substituted for the older veterans in a timely fashion.

== Levels ==
Each group had a leader, chosen democratically by its members, and potentially had several levels. Men were grouped by their skill, with the lowest being "el mancebo" (the youth), who was being apprenticed to learn the trade. The levels were as follows:

- Old mountain crossbowman
- Young mountain crossbowman
- Youth

== See also ==
- Almogavar
- Border of Granada
- Kingdom of Murcia
- Reconquista
- Granada War
