= Quod natura non dat, Salmantica non praestat =

"Quod natura non dat, Salmantica non praestat" (In English What nature does not give, Salamanca does not lend) is a Latin proverb that means that a university can not give anyone what nature denied. In this way, neither intelligence nor memory nor the capacity for learning are things that a university can offer its students.

Since this emblem appears carved in the stone that receives the visitor in the building of the smaller schools of the University of Salamanca it has been mistakenly believed that this phrase corresponds to the motto of the University of Salamanca itself. The motto of the University of Salamanca is: «Omnium scientiarum princeps Salmantica docet» (Salamanca is foremost in teaching all the sciences).
