= Almogavars =

Medieval soldiers from the Crown of Aragon

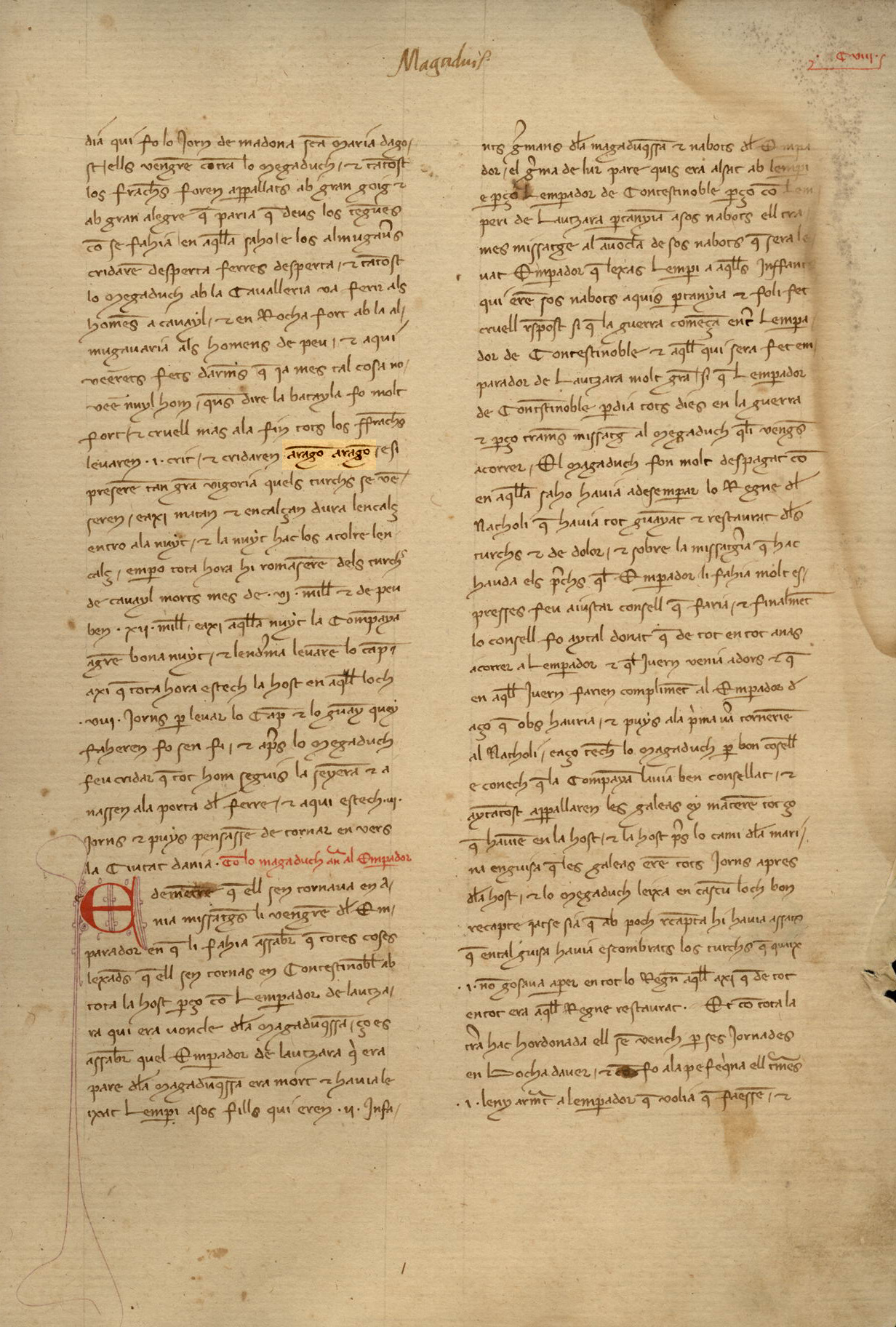
Page 114r of the Chronicle of Ramon Muntaner, in which the war cries used by the Almogavars are described: "the Almogavars shout: Rise Iron!, Rise! ... What do we say? The battle was so strong and cruel, but in the end, all the Franks rose up in one cry: Aragon!, Aragon!"

Almogavars (Spanish: almogávares; Aragonese: almugávares; Catalan: almogàvers; Portuguese: almogávares; originally Andalusian Arabic: المغاور, romanized: al-mughā́wir) is the name of a class of light infantry soldier that originated in Spain during the Reconquista and was used to great effect by Aragon during its Mediterranean conquests of the 13th and 14th centuries.

Almogavars were lightly clad, quick-moving frontiersmen and foot-soldiers. They hailed from the Kingdom of Aragon, the Principality of Catalonia, the Kingdom of Valencia, the Crown of Castile and the Kingdom of Portugal. In the Crown of Castile, the inner organization was managed by King Alfonso X of Castile in the Siete Partidas. At first, these troops were formed by farmers and shepherds originating from the countryside, woods, and frontier mountain areas. Later, they were employed as mercenaries in Italy, the Frankokratia, and the Levant.

== Etymology ==
There are several theories as to where this name comes from: al-mughāwir (المغوار; Arabic for 'the raider'), al-mukhābir (المخابر, 'the carrier of news'), or al-mujāwir (المجاور, 'the pilgrim', as in 'adjunct [to a holy place]'). Another theory holds that it comes from the adjective gabar, which translates as 'prideful' or 'haughty'. Similarly, the names of their military ranks derive from Arabic.

== Saracen origin of the term ==
The term was first used in the 10th century in the territory of Al-Andalus, to refer to small armed groups of Saracens engaged in looting and surprise attacks. The first documented historical reference appeared in the chronicle Akhbar muluk Al-Andalus or Chronicle of the Moor Rasis, the history of the kings of Al-Andalus, written between 887 and 955 by Ahmad ibn Muhammad al-Razi, known among Arabs by the name "Al-Tarikhi" ("The Chronicler") and among Christians as the "Moor Rasis". In his chronicle, the historian of Qurtuba describes the territories of Al-Andalus, and upon arrival at the Ebro Valley, cites the existence of some troops called Almogavars present in the city of Saraqusta for the first time:

And the city of Saraqusta was the chamber of the Almojarifes for a long time, and was the choice of the warriors. And when they fought the city of Saraqusta, and fought all the alcalles (Moorish chiefs) and Almogavars, they chose for them.

— Ahmad ibn Muhammad al-Razi, Ajbàr mulùk Al-Andalus

The word Almogavar was also used during the last centuries of the Reconquista (reconquest of Spain), at the Granadan border, for designating the groups of Moorish bandits that launched attacks from the kingdom of Granada on the border towns of the kingdoms of Murcia and Valencia.

== Christian adaptation ==
The Aragonese were the first Christians to adopt those strategies and fight like the groups of Saracens known as Almogavars, which eventually led to them being known by the same name.

Even though there were no contemporary chronicles of the events of the 11th and 12th centuries, the first time that any Christian Almogavars are mentioned is in a testimony by Jerónimo Zurita in his Annals of Aragón, which places the Almogavars in the time of Alfonso I of Aragon reinforcing the fortress of El Castellar around 1105–1110 with visions of the conquest of Zaragoza:

Taking Tahuste. Almogavar guards. From there he was passing downstream and captured the seat of Tahuste next to the banks of the Ebro; which he won through the bravery and great strength of Don Bachalla. And soon after began to set people talking about war and training hard for it, they called them almogavars, in 'el Castellar' who were on the frontier against the Moors of Zaragoza.

— J. Zurita, Anales de Aragón, cap. XLI. "De las guerras que el emperador don Alonso [por Alfonso I el Batallador] hizo a los moros".

Alfonso the Chaste, loyal to his friendship with the kingdom of Castile, went to besiege al-madinat Kunka in 1177, with a group of foot soldiers identified as Almogavars, to help the Castilian monarch.

== Socioeconomic origin ==
Due to the Muslim invasion of the Iberian peninsula, the wars of the Reconquista ("Reconquest") and the military campaigns of Al Andalus, the Christian shepherds had to organize themselves into bands of outlaws and penetrate the enemy domain in search of what their people needed to survive. During these raids, which usually lasted a few days, the Almogavars would live off the land and sleep out in the open, skills acquired from their former life as shepherds; the majority of them had grown up in the mountains, where the harshness of the climate limited the resources of the land.

But after many generations of leading this new kind of life that they had been pushed into by the invaders, it seems that a warrior spirit formed in these shepherd communities, and they ended up not knowing how to live by any other means than waging war. In addition, it was much easier to make a living through attacks lasting a few days than by working hard for the whole year. This way of life went on being adopted by the inhabitants of the areas that bordered the Muslim territories as the Christian kingdoms advanced toward the south. The presence of Islamic Almogavars fighting alongside Catholic Almogavars is also documented.

== Description ==
They were characterized as being infantry shock troops that fought on foot, with light arms and baggage, generally with a pair of javelins, one short spear ("ascona muntera" in Catalan, meaning "a hunting spear") and a falchion. They had full beards and dressed poorly, only in a short gown (both in summer and winter); they wore a thick leather belt and leather sandals. In addition, they always carried a good piece of flint with them that they struck their weapons with before going into battle, which gave off sparks that, together with their unpleasant cries, terrorized their enemies. Endowed with valor and ferocity, those from the Crown of Aragon entered into combat to the cry of "Awake iron! Let's kill, let's kill", "for Saint George!" and "Aragon! Aragon!".

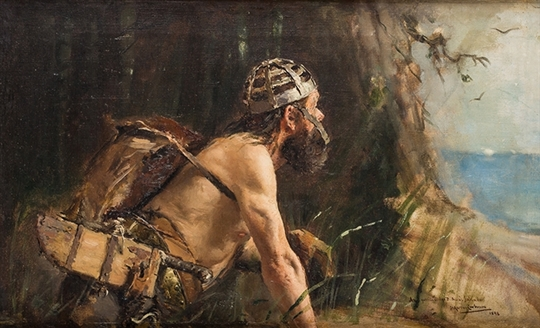
Painting of an Almogavar warrior, José Moreno Carbonero (1898)

The following excerpt from the chronicle Llibre del rei en Pere d'Aragó e dels seus antecessors passats (Book of King Peter of Aragon and of his past ancestors) by Bernat Desclot, describes the Almogavars:

These people who are called Almogavars live for nothing more than the profession of arms. They don't live in the cities or the villages, but rather in the mountains and forests, and fight every day against the Saracens: and enter the Saracens' land for a day or two, pillaging and taking Saracens captive; and that is how they live. And they endure harsh living conditions which others could not endure. They could well spend two days without eating if necessary, eating herbs of the fields with no problem. And the adalids (leaders) who lead them know the country and roads. And they do not wear more than a tunic or shirt, be it summer or winter, and they wear leather breeches on their legs and leather sandals on their feet. And they carry a good knife and a good shoulder strap and a flint steel in their belt. And they each carry a good lance and two spears, as well as a leather shoulder bag, where they carry their food. And they are very strong and very quick, for escape and for pursuit, and they are Catalans and Aragonese and Saracens.

— Bernat Desclot, Libre del rei en Pere e dels seus antecessors passats, cap. LXXIX

However, such descriptions are not complete, and the description of the Almogavars differs more or less depending on the place and time. Thus, the previous description, which describes them as people not living in villages but in remote areas such as forests and mountains, as well as the description of their weapons, only refers to Almogavars of the time indicated, and probably earlier centuries. The last Almogavars, those who from the second half of the 15th century to the 16th had the border of Granada as their sphere of influence, were residents of the towns there, were very knowledgeable about the terrain, and rampaged against the Granadan territory.

Their basic characteristics were lifelong dedication to war, not just as a profession but as a way of life, adapted to the conditions of the border with the Saracens. They were characterized by their looting and the sale or ransom of prisoners, frugality and resistance to fatigue, light weapons, and hierarchical organization.

== Requirements and military rank ==
The requirements the Almogavars had to meet were compiled by King Alfonso X in the Siete Partidas, included fitness and endurance, as well as agility. The codification of their ranks is also set out in this legal code.

=== Adalid (leader) ===
From the Arab word dalid (guide, conductor), was the highest rank in the Almogavar force. The adalid required wisdom, courage, intelligence and loyalty in order to guide the army on appropriate routes and to avoid danger, as well as knowledge of the land to secure places for shelter, with adequate water, firewood and grazing, and to know how to track the steps of the enemy. Among these functions were to prepare and organise expeditions and sole authority to make all decisions about raids, and he had a status similar to that of a knight (lower nobility). To appoint an adalid, twelve adalids or, in their absence, other authorised officials met and swore in the name of the king that the candidate had the necessary talents to perform this duty. After this oath, the king or other official presented him with a sword and baldric. Then he stood on a shield and the king or his representative unsheathed the sword and placed it in his hand. The adalids lifted their new colleague high, facing eastwards, and he made a pattern in the air with his sword, in the form of the cross and said:

"I, N, challenge all the enemies of the faith in the name of God and of my Lord and King and of his land".

He then did the same facing the other cardinal points of the earth. The ceremony concluded, the adalid sheathed his sword and the king said to him:

"Henceforth you are an adalid".

Initially this was a lifelong responsibility, but from the end of the 14th century it became hereditary, which brought the adalid still closer to the lower ranks of the nobility.

=== Almogavar a llom cavall (mounted Almogavar) ===
An intermediate rank between the adalid and the almocaden is documented in Castile.

=== Almocaden ===
From Arabic al-muqaddem, 'the captain', 'he who leads'. He was of a lower rank and a captain of autonomous Almogavar groups; for this he was required to be knowledgeable about war and about leading his group, to have motivation, to know how to motivate his peers and to be light, to be faster and to be able to hide easily in addition to being fair, as set forth in Title XII, Act V of the entries (the Partidas):

They now call almocadenes those who formerly were usually called leaders of the peons, and these are very advantageous in war; in places they can go in among the soldiers and accomplish things that those on horseback could not do. And so when he has there any peon that wants to be almocadén has to do this: first to come to the adalids and show them for what reasons have to deserve to be so, then they should call twelve almocadenes and make them swear to tell truth if that who wants to be a man almocadén itself having four things: the first war to be knowing and guiding those with him they belonged; second, it endeavored to undertake the facts and strive to yours: the third to be light, as this is something that should be much the peon to achieve what any soon to take, and for knowing as well garrison when it was great need, the fourth is to be loyal to be a friend of his master and campaigns he leads. And this should be taken into account by the leader of peons.

The almocaden was an Almogavar of demonstrated experience who was accepted as a leader by the Almogavars of his group. Just like the two previous ranks, it also seems to have entailed being mounted on a horse, although there is only the reference of two almocadenes on horseback, so this requirement remains unclear.

=== Almogavar ===
Also called hombres de campo (countrymen) or peones (pawns) in Castile, these were of the lowest rank and formed the bulk of the army. As the Law VI, Title VII established, of the codes (the Partidas), to be elected an adalid it was necessary to have earlier been an Almogavar on horseback, and to be this, previously to be an almocaden, and to be an almocaden, previously an Almogavar.

== Historic military significance ==
The Almogavars were considered one of the best infantries of their era. In an age in which cavalry was the favored weapon of armies and the model of the chivalric ideal was a continuing myth, the Almogavars used the terrain to their advantage, fought at night and always went on foot without wearing armour, which gave them great mobility. Ramon Llull gave them as much importance as the crossbowmen and heavy armoured knights. According to his view, the only way to effectively combat Islam and recover the Holy Land was to start the war from the Spanish border, defeat the Moors of Al-Andalus, go to North Africa, and gradually moving up to the Levant; considering this and their military effectiveness, the Almogavars were a key part of his plan. In the year he wrote his chronicle (1315), the Almogavars were at the height of their fame and had achieved renown throughout the Mediterranean for their exploits in Tunisia, Sicily, and in the Catalan Company.

When they were carrying out border incursions, the Almogavars usually fought in small, autonomous groups of five to fifteen men, counting on surprise. In times of open warfare, the groups were more numerous and there is mention of twenty or thirty comrades per group. Also, very rarely, some Almogavars participated in corsair operations against Granada.

It also must be emphasized that they were not exactly an army, but formed a very hard way of life, and they did not usually have any jobs: They took everything from their raids; so in times of peace, they were a great nuisance for any leader. The primary activity of these groups was to carry out small raids in enemy territory with the objective of taking livestock and captives and then selling them. In times of war, the kings and local nobles encouraged these activities, which yielded the King's fifth of the booty obtained.

They were born during the violence of the frontier between the Islamic and the Christian world and were often the cause of the frontier tensions. The frontier with the Saracen, not very attractive for people who wished for a life of quiet work, was a refuge for adventurers, of people who enjoyed living with risks and who lived by the fist and by looting enemy territory. During the wars they joined the army, most of the time without a salary, but in exchange for rights on the loot, and being fed.

=== Tactics ===
Their mission consisted of exploring the land where the army was advancing, standing at forefront and flanks, harassing the enemy, attacking their garrisons by surprise and intercepting their convoys. They preferred to fight in open order, but if they were in trouble they could form a compact mass to fight off repeated cavalry charges, as happened against the Moors at Alcoll.

Almogavars acted as light infantry and could act in collaboration with heavy cavalry, but unlike other medieval infantry troops they did not require their support. In the mercenary companies, besides Almogavars, there were units of "knights, infantry, archers, scudars, and men guarding the weapons of galleys", each one with a specific mission that could be coordinated on the battlefield. They always retained their autonomy and were a permanent militia, because their modus vivendi consisted of making raids in enemy border territory. For this reason, they always carried light arms in order to move swiftly during the raids, which could last two or three days before getting to villages with decent booty. For this reason, their long marches proved their endurance, speed, and frugality.

In the Europe of those times armoured heavy cavalry was the dominant shock force, so their tactics proved to be an innovation. The Almogavars were uncomfortable riding, and always fought on foot. Acting as light infantry, the first thing they did was throw their spears at the knights, piercing their armour and shields from a distance, but especially fatally wounding the horses. They also got into the enemy formation to cut the hocks of the animals with their heavy knives, or impaled them with spears. In the melee they did not hesitate to use their heavy knives or maces to disembowel horses, and when the agonized mounts collapsed they rushed at the horsemen with their knives to kill them.

== Presence in the Crown of Aragon ==
The Almogavars of the Crown of Aragon (originally from Aragonese, Catalan and Valencian origins) are the best known because of their deeds and international protection, both in the Mediterranean expansion, as well as the Catalan Company, an Almogavar unit of great fame.

They formed a numerous host, as Peter III of Aragon (1276–1285) led 15,000 of them in his expedition to Tunisia and Sicily, and they also fought in the Principality of Catalonia during the crusade against the Crown of Aragon, under the leadership of Roger of Lauria, participating in the battle of the pass of the Panizas (Coll de Panissars, in Catalan).

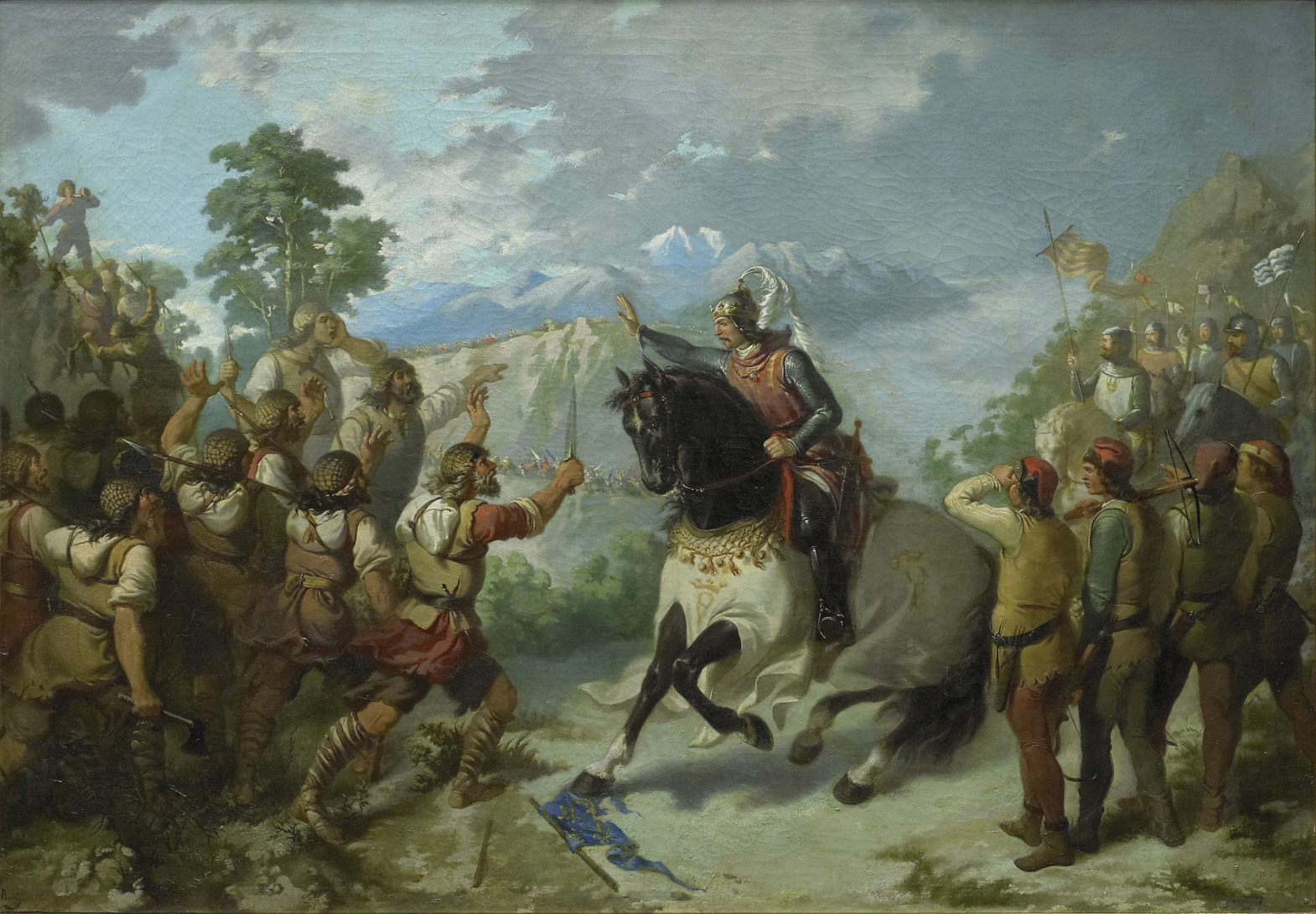
Peter the Great with his Almogavars in the Battle of the Col de Panissars. 1866. Bartomeu Ribó Térriz.

=== Conquest ===
The Catalan, Aragonese, and later, Valencian Almogavars played an important role in the advance of the Crown of Aragon against the Islamic States, participating moreover in countless raids, in the battle of Las Navas de Tolosa (1212), in the crusade against Majorca (1229–1232) and in the conquest of Valencia (1233–1245). In 1232, Almogovar armies took the strategic enclaves of Ares and Morella, opening the doors to the conquest of Valencia. After several failed attempts, in 1240, a coalition of calatravian knights and an important almogavar contingent managed to seize the fortified place of Villena, a town located in territory reserved for Castile according to the Treaty of Cazola which would unleash a series of tensions that ended with the signing of the new Treaty of Almizra. When the Moorish rebellion in Murcia took place in 1264, and James I went to this kingdom to the aid of his son-in-law, he says in his Chronicle (Llibre dels Fets) that while he was in Orihuela, studying how to take the capital to end the rebellion, "two Almogavars from Lorca came at midnight and knocked on the door" to alert him that, from Lorca, they had spotted a large contingent of Moors who headed towards Murcia.

=== War in Sicily and crusade against the Crown of Aragon ===
On 30 March 1282, Peter III of Aragon waged war on Charles of Anjou after the Sicilian Vespers for the possession of Naples and Sicily. The Almogavars formed the most effective element of his army. Their discipline, ferocity and the force with which they hurled their javelins made them formidable against heavy cavalry of the Angevin armies. They fought against cavalry by attacking the enemies' horses instead of the knights themselves. Once a knight was on the ground he was an easy victim of an Almogavar.

Between 1284 and 1285, the Crusade against the Crown of Aragon was declared by Pope Martin IV against King Peter the Great of Aragon. This crusade was declared based on King Peter's intervention in Sicilian affairs against the papal will. Most of the conflict took place in Catalonia, although the first episode took place in the frontier of Navarre and Aragon. The Almogavars were at the service of King commanded by King Peter or Roger of Lauria.

Roger of Lauria had much more control over his captains than the enemies did. His crews were made up of specialized troops, instead of the more generic types used by his enemies. His archers were used initially, while his oarsmen Almogavars stayed under cover. These Almogavars were much more agile than the heavily armoured knights with swords, as his enemies often used, especially on the moving deck of a galley at sea. Roger used trickery to disguise the size of his force. In addition, he sometimes kept some of his galleys hidden, to attack the rear of the enemy after the battle had started.

Roger was also infamous for the ruthless sackings and the devastation of his actions, often driven only by greed and personal advantage. On the other side, his reputation alone possibly caused some enemies to lose heart during a battle.

=== Catalan Company ===
In 1302, the Peace of Caltabellotta ended the war in southern Italy. 4,000 Almogavars, under the leadership of Roger de Flor ("Roger Blum", a former Knight Templar), formed the Catalan Company in the service of the Emperor of the East, Andronicus II Palaeologus. This company was organized to fight against the Turks, defending the Byzantine Empire. Both kings of Aragon and Sicily agreed with this strategy as a viable alternative to having the Almogavar army standing unemployed in their realms.

The Almogavar campaign in Asia Minor to drive back Turks took place in 1303 and 1304 and began with a series of great military victories that drove them back from Philadelphia to Cyzicus and in doing so brought great destruction to the Anatolian landscape. When the Almogavars insisted in receiving the agreed payment, the Byzantine Emperor refused. In 1305, Roger de Flor and his lieutenants were assassinated by orders of the Emperor while meeting to discuss terms on their compensation. This assassination may have been instigated by Genoese merchants, who were conspiring to keep their own position of influence and power.

This betrayal resulted in the surviving Almogavars, who resisted for two years a siege in Gallipoli and concentrated on the region of Thrace, leading off the Catalan Revenge, a war of extermination and systematic looting against the civilian population of the Byzantine Empire between 1305 and 1307 in revenge and retaliation for the murder of Roger de Flor and the attempted annihilation of the company while it was stationed at Gallipoli.

=== Duchy of Athens ===
After a period of internal conflict, the Great Company left the line and moved to Greece where it was hired by the Duke of Athens, who didn't pay what they agreed to; so the Almogavars marched against the Duchy of Athens, under the rule of the French House of Brienne. In March 1310, Duke Walter V of Brienne and all his knights were defeated and slain by the Almogavars at the Battle of the Cephissus, or Orchomenus in Boeotia. They then divided the wives and possessions of the Frenchmen by lot and summoned a prince of the house of Aragon to rule over them.

The culminating achievement of the Almogavars was the foundation of Aragonese rule over the duchy of Athens. Although the duchy eventually fell, even today the King of Spain still holds the title of Duke of Athens and Neopatria.

=== Late period ===
The Aragonese Almogavars also distinguished themselves in the war against Castile (1296–1304), where they participated in considerable numbers, but in the 14th century their numbers dropped drastically due to the end of major wars of expansion and because a large number of them went to take part in the expedition of Peter the Great to Sicily, from which many never returned but instead continued fighting in Italy, having enrolled in Guelph armies or in the Catalan Company.

The vacuum was never refilled, but they were yet remarkable in the crusade against Almeria (1309), in the campaigns of Granada (1330–1334), against the king of Mallorca (1343–1344), in expeditions to Sardinia (1353, 1354 and 1367), and again against Castile (1356–1369), but in the latter they no longer made up the bulk of the infantry but rather were special units for dangerous and explorers' raids. In 1384–1385 some small groups of 30 to 100 Almogavars participated in the war against the Earl of Ampurias. Shortly after, they defended the Principality of Catalonia against the invasion attempt of the Armagnac count in 1390, and the next attempt of the Foix count from 1396 up to 1397. In the 15th century, there were still groups of Almogavars in the Italian wars of Alfonso the Magnanimous.

== Presence in the Crown of Castile ==
The presence of Almogavars in Castile, despite being somewhat unknown, is well documented. They had an important a role in the conquest of Andalucia just as at the border of Granada. In addition to the aforementioned role in the groups of Alfonso X, they are also mentioned in ballad 374 of the said author. There, it is told how a group of Almogavars achieved nothing in their brawls until they decided to hold a vigil in the chapel of Alcazar, after which they came out on horseback and won victory with good booty, offering the Virgin a cloth of purple and gold.

=== Kingdom of Jaen ===
This place was for many years a place of raids by Almogavars of Aragonese, Navarrese and Basque ancestry, especially in places like Pegalajar, Cambil, Huelma and Arenas. To the north of the castle of this locality exists a zone that was known as Campo de Almogavares (Land of Almogavars).

=== Conquest of Cordoba ===
The beginning of the conquest of the city of Cordoba by the Almogavars is told by Argote de Molina:

At 1235, the rich men and Hidalgos (low nobility) Adalids and Almogavars (who were on the border of this kingdom) gathered in Andujar and entered into Cordoba lands, where they captured some Moors, who told them how the Cordoba city was very neglected, where no one was controlling or distrusting the Christians.

Before this very favorable news, they gather, Martin Ruiz de Argote, Domingo Munoz, Diego Munoz, Diego Martinez el Adalid, Pedro Ruiz de Tafur, Alvaro Colodro and Benito Banos, and agree to assault the suburbs of Cordoba, giving warning to Don Alvar Perez of Castro.

They arrived in Cordoba on the night of 23 December 1235, with great daring and skill, stealthily scaled, clambering up disguised as Moors and seizing the Puerta del Colodro. The first to climb the wall was Álvaro Colodro, then following his comrades. Such was the success achieved, other towers that reached up to the Martos door, stayed Ajarquía conquered, until 29 June 1236 Córdoba surrenders to Ferdinand III.

=== Border of Granada ===
Kingdom of Granada, at whose borders the Almogavars operated

Almogavars had a relevant presence at the border of Granada, where their ranks were made up of neighbors of the border localities and adventurers looking for booty in the kingdom of Granada. Other times, the reason leading them to become Almogavars was revenge. The brutal raids of Benimerines and Zenetes coming from North Africa, which especially affected the western area of the border, caused the destruction of entire towns and the enslaving of its inhabitants, which led the survivors to join Almogavar groups commanded by Almocadenes, turning their new life into a continuous feeling of revenge. This was the case of many of the neighbors of Vejer, Alcala de los Gazules, Medina-Sidonia and Lebrija, who after an attack in 1293 where the North Africans kidnapped over 200 captives to sell them as slaves, enlisted in the Almogavar ranks.

Besides the looting, they were engaged in other activities. When groups of bandits from Granada were detected going in Christian territory, Almogavars hid by the roads they used or by their water sources, in order to surprise them as they passed by these places. Grateful municipalities across the border, such as Murcia or Orihuela, rewarded this activity.

When Almogavars were deployed throughout the border, it was very difficult for any potential enemy to pass, unless it was a large contingent of troops or someone who knew the area very well and passed through the fields at night. In April 1309, when the war between Castile and Granada had already begun and before the Crown of Aragon also declared war on Granada, the roads of the kingdom of Murcia were so full of Almogavars that Pedro López de Ayala, who ruled the kingdom, advised against the move of the ambassadors of the king of Granada returning from the court of James II, saying that they would surely be captured, even if they had a guide.

Almogavars also used to work for intelligence services and surveillance, which depended on the municipalities or the royal officers, and were vital to the defense of the border with the Saracens. The surveillance of the border was based on two fixed networks of lookouts in the mountains with good visibility, in the administration of Orihuela and another in Valencia procurement "beyond the Júcar" on the former border of kingdom of Valencia, i.e., in the area close to the line Busot – Biar. The mission of the Almogavar scouts was to observe possible entries of enemies and warn of this fact by smoke signals during the day and fire by night. These signals were transmitted from one scout to another, so that after a while the whole country could be warned. Other monitoring points were located on the main roads, where the mission was to stand guard against the numerous robberies of foot traffic. They also guarded mountain passes and river fords, especially the Cañaveral del Segura ford, near Cieza, where the guerrillas or armies used to cross the river.

Sometimes municipalities required services of Almogavars to track Granadian robbers, that they knew well to spot because they knew how to be quiet when they entered a Christian land; they used to replace iron horseshoes with esparto horseshoes, which left some footprints and often unique pieces of this clothing material.

Free activities of Almogavars originated numerous diplomatic conflicts with Granada as they did not respect the signed peace. Valencian Almogavars were also a source of friction with the Crown of Castile, because of frequent Granadian reprisals after a raid of Valencian Almogavars, exercised against Murcian border populations, because Almogavars from Valencia or Murcia had caused damage to the neighboring territory.

=== Granada war ===
Adalids played an important role in this conflict, as were those who knew the territory better and how to combat Granadians because they were familiar with them. They commanded hosts of Hidalgos (noblemen) from Oviedo. They are also described by Diego Hurtado de Mendoza in War of Granada:

They call Adalid in Spanish to the guides and heads of country people, who came to take land of enemies and these people called Almogavars formerly was rated the post of Adalid; were chosen by their Almogavars (...) on the trail they knew footprints of any wild animal or person so quickly and do not stop to conjecture; solving for signs (...).

=== North Africa ===
The first Almogavars acting here were those of the Crown of Aragon, especially those under the reign of Peter III the Great and led by Roger de Lauria made several raids on the coast of Tunisia. Ramon Muntaner recounted some of these battles, such as the occupation of the island of Djerba.

Once they conquered Granada, veteran Almogavars embarked to conquer African coastal places, shelters of pirates and corsairs.

=== Other conflicts ===
John I, coming to the battle of Aljubarrota against Portugal, requested the rapid advent of "those Almogavares". Also hosts of Murcian Almogavars intervened in the early reign of the Catholic Monarchs against aristocratic opposition led by the Marquis of Villena in his advocacy of the rights of the daughter of Henry IV.

== Almogavars in Portugal ==
There are abundant references to the existence of Almogavars in the Kingdom of Portugal, who played an important role in the African campaigns in which they were immersed in the 15th and 16th centuries, where Almogavars and Almocadenes guarded the borders of the Portuguese possessions in North Africa. Their military rank, exactly the same as their Castilian and Aragonese counterparts, is collected in Alfonsine Ordinances, and the Chronicle of King Manuel states "They sent Almogavars to run (...) to attack the Moors".

== Decline ==
The end of the great wars of expansion in the Iberian Peninsula, with only the Kingdom of Granada resisting, meant the gradual decrease in the number of Almogavars. While the Granadian border offered good opportunities of profit, penetrating it was not as profitable as before, since most of the captured Moors ended up being slaves and their price did not justify the risk of crossing the border to catch them. Moreover, in peacetime royal officials closely watched these activities, so it was very difficult to sell those captives as slaves.

This had several implications. On the one hand, the figure of Almogavars was transmuted to the Ballestero de monte (mountain crossbowmen) and head hunters, who held mainly defensive functions against frequent attacks from Granada. On the other, it meant drift of some Almogavars to banditry.

When these activities were illegal in peacetime, some Almogavars from Orihuela soon discovered that it was much safer to make raids in their own territory, where there were also Moors; the Islamic communities at the time of the conquest had accepted Christian domain. Almogavars took members of these communities as prisoners, hid them in caves and demanded ransom or sold them far away as captives. Often these Almogavars were acting not in their own territory, but in the neighboring one, to better ensure their impunity and further complicate the chase. To do so, they found moral justifications based on the suspicions against the Moors of the Murcian kingdom, accused of helping fellow Granadians in raids on Christian territory. At a popular level, in addition, the distinction between enemy Moors and Moors who were not was not very clear. Almogavars practicing this crime of kidnapping or collera, consisting of taking a free person to sell as slave, were called Collerats. Almogavars were so often dedicated to this activity that the word Almogavar eventually ended up becoming synonymous with Collerat.

Some Almogavar groups also committed abuses against the Christian population of the neighboring kingdoms, as in May 1296 when a Christian boy of five along with some Saracens had been captured by Almogavars in Murcia and sold as a Moorish captive. Also in May, James II ordered the return of some prisoners robbed and sold by Almogavars which belonged to three Catalan knights. In June, the king commanded that some Saracens be released, and returned their cows, mares and all other livestock that belonged to them, which were stolen by Almogavars. These criminal practices made Almogavars to fall into great disrepute.

== Cultural and linguistic legacy ==
=== Negative connotation of Almogavars ===
Almogavars were also known as "Catalans" in Byzantine Empire territories. The presence of the company left its mark on the folklore and the popular legend of the different regions where they went, including as far as the Balkans and Greece. Devastation caused by Almogavar troops has created a negative connotation in some places.

In the Greek regions of Attica and Boeotia, a popular saying included: may the revenge of the Catalans fall on you, while in the region of Parnassus, the following saying was popularized: "I will flee from the Turks to fall into the hands of the Catalans".

In Bulgaria, the expressions "Catalan" or "Aragonese" and "son of Catalan" mean "evil man, soulless, torturer". Ivan M. Vazov in the poem Pirates, first published in 1915, includes the Catalans with the Turks as the greatest oppressors of the Bulgarian nation, while in Albania the word "Catalan" means "ugly and wicked man." Likewise, "Catalan" or "Katallani" is designated in Albanian folklore as a monster with one eye, reminiscent in many ways the Cyclops Polyphemus. This cyclops is represented by a wild blacksmith who feeds on human flesh. He also has no knees, so he cannot bend, and long legs like masts of a ship. He faces a young hero named Dedaliya. This tradition, in various versions, is usually called by the title of Daedalus dhe Katallani, Daedalus and Catalan.

=== Almogavar legacy in contemporary culture ===
Standard of the 6th Airborne Brigade "Almogávares" (obverse)

- In Spain, Paratrooper Brigade VI is called "Almogávares". The first Spanish paratrooper unit was founded on 17 October 1953 and named after Almogavar commander Roger de Flor.

In addition, Almogavars have appeared in some works of fiction:

- In the 1942 Spanish film Raza, based on a semi-autobiographical script by the then head of state Francisco Franco, a Navy officer describes to his children the Almogavars as model soldiers.
- In Assassin's Creed Revelations, a video game produced by Ubisoft, there is a unit called "Byzantine Almogavar" based on Almogavars.

== See also ==
- Kingdom of Murcia
- Battle of Halmyros
- Desperta Ferro! (Awake iron!)
- Mercenaries of the ancient Iberian Peninsula

== Bibliography ==
- Bolea Robles, Chusé L. (2010). Almugávares. Via Sus! [Almogavars. Via Sus!] (in Spanish). Sabiñanigo: ARA Cultural. pp. 1–728. ISBN 978-84-613-8317-7.
- Boya Balet, Ángel (2014), La compañía de los almogávares en Grecia (in Spanish), Madrid: Liber Factory, ISBN 9788499496412.
- Fancy, Hussein (2016), The Mercenary Mediterranean: Sovereignty, Religion, and Violence in the Medieval Crown of Aragon, University of Chicago Press, ISBN 9780226329642.
