= Spanish Air and Space Force Honour Squadron =

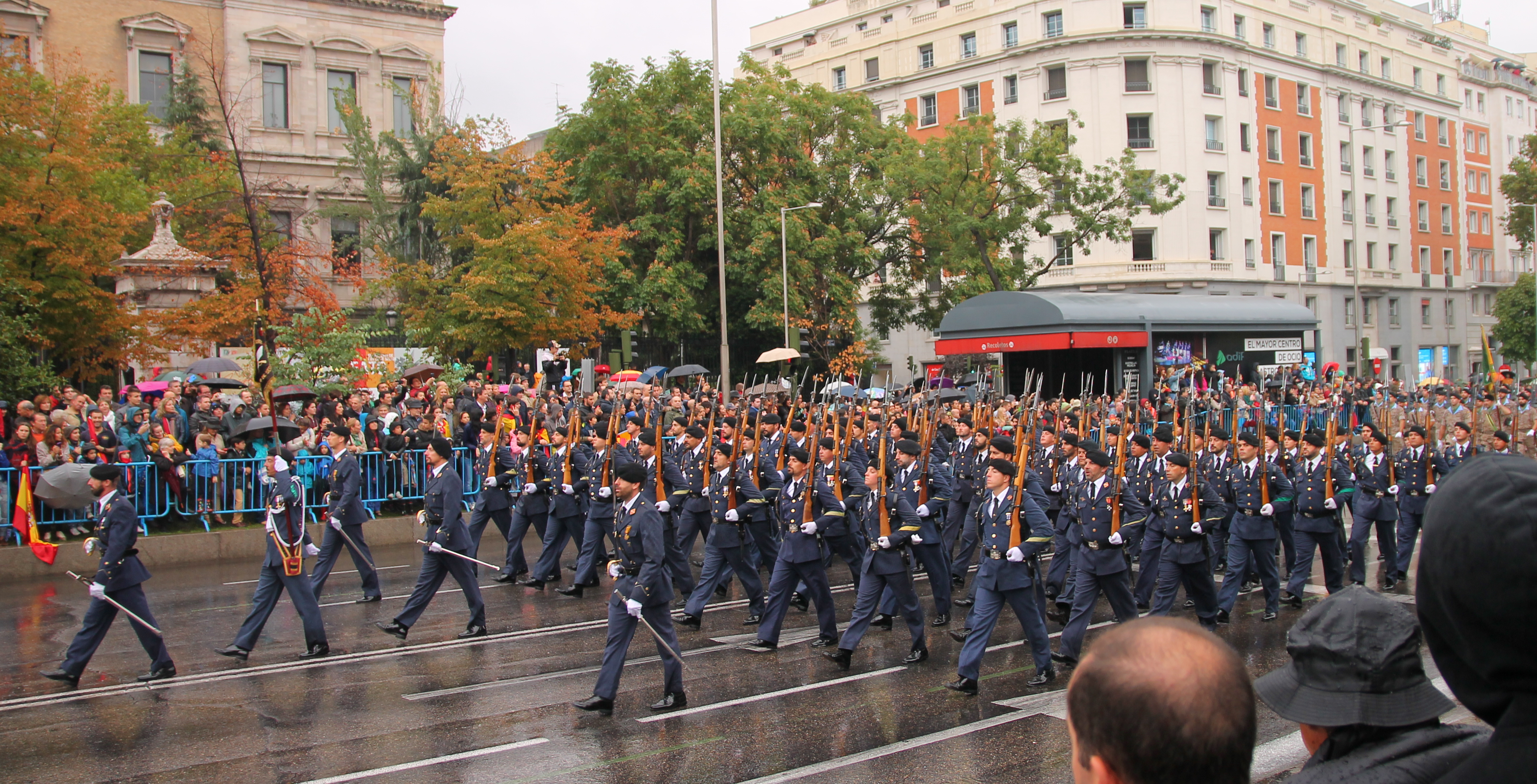
The squadron during the Fiesta Nacional de España military parade in Madrid.

The Air and Space Force Honors Squadron (Spanish: Escuadrilla de Honores del Ejército del Aire y del Espacio) is the ceremonial unit attached to the as an operational component of the Spanish Air and Space Force. The EDHEA part of the Security Group of the Grouping of the General Headquarters and is located at Madrid-Cuatro Vientos Airport.

== History ==
In March 1991, the Air Force restructured itself with a headquarters and a force support structure. The unit that is now the EDHEA has been represented with different names since: Police and Honors Squadron, 11th Honors Squadron, Honors Squadron and the Police and Honors Squadron. On 23 April 1998, a unit moved to the Getafe Air Base to a formation in Casa de Campo. On 17 May 2005, by order of Ministers of Defence José Bono, the squadron gained as one missions the duty of participating in honor ceremonies. It was thought to be single squadron that would perform in all Air Force ceremonies on Spanish territory.

== Role ==
The EDHEA's primary role is to render military honors and participate in military parades and ceremonies throughout the national territory. As a secondary role, it carries out security and land defense operations that include the protection of facilities and escort of convoys. It has participated in tactical exercises in various conditions as well as with other Spanish and foreign units (ex. the Pico 2013 exercises). There currently are 120 members of the squadron, whose official motto is "Conoce tu medida" ("Know your measure"). The personnel requirement is that ones height must be more than 1.70 centimeters. Within the EDHEA, there are three sections, as well as a unit known as the "Patrol of Honors", a unit that specializes in exhibition drill in a similar fashion to its counterparts in the United States Air Force Honor Guard. The squadron is an annual participant in the Fiesta Nacional de España military parade on 12 October. Every year, it takes part inbetween 2 and 5 events nationally and internationally.
