= Awake iron! =

Medieval battle cry

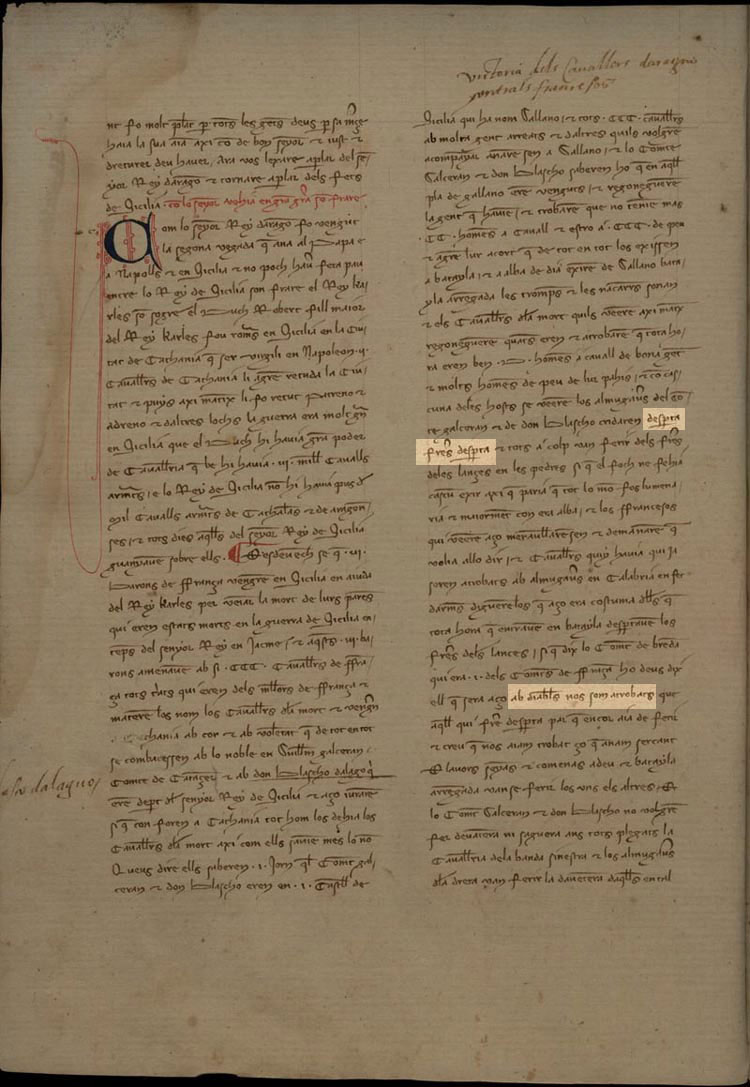
Desperta Ferres! Desperta! Battle of Gagliano (1300) Crònica de Ramon Muntaner (Codex 1342)

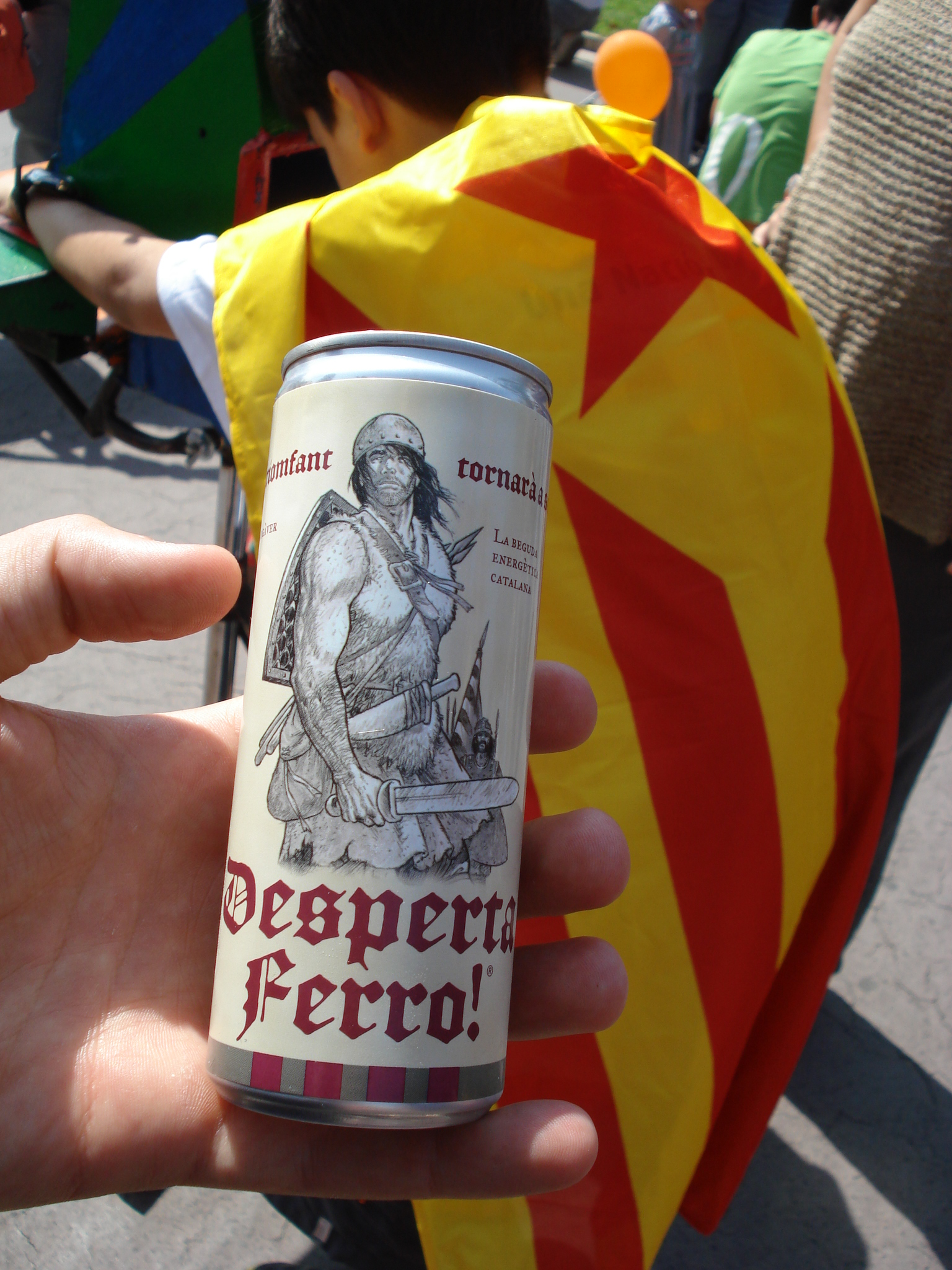
Desperta Ferro! energy drink.

Awake iron! (Catalan: Desperta Ferro!, IPA: [dəsˈpɛɾtə ˈfɛru]; Medieval Aragonese: Desperta Ferres!) was a battle cry of the Middle Ages employed by the Almogavars. It was shouted on entering the fight, to frighten the enemy and invoke the presence of iron in the battle.

Other Almogaver war-cries were Aragó, Aragó! ("Aragon!"), Via Sus! Via Sus! ("onto them!"), Sant Jordi! Sant Jordi! ("Saint George!"). However, of these Desperta Ferro! has emerged as the most famous, as it was unique to those forces. The cry was given as the Almogàvers struck their lances and darts with flints, causing sparks to fly up from the stones.

Nowadays, it is still used as a motto for the Spanish Army 6th Paratroopers Brigade "Almogávares". "Desperta Ferro" is also the name of a Catalonia-manufactured energy drink.

== See also ==
- Sicilian Vespers
- Catalan Company
