= Paratroopers Brigade "Almogávares" VI =

- Brigada "Almogávares" VI de Paracaidistas
- Coat of Arms of the Brigade
- Active: 17 October 1953 - present
- Country: Spain
- Branch: Army
- Type: Airborne forces
- Size: 3,000
- Garrison/HQ: Madrid; Murcia
- Nickname: Paracas
- Mottos: ¡Desperta Ferro! (Awake iron!) ¡Triunfar o Morir! (Succeed or die!); Per crucem ad lucem (Through the cross to light)
- Anniversaries: October 17
- Engagements: Rif War; Ifni War; Yugoslav Wars; Afghanistan War; Iraq War; Lebanon War; Bosnian War; Kosovo War; Military intervention against ISIL

Commanders
- Notable commanders: Tomás Pallás Sierra

Insignia
- Coat of Arms as Light Infantry Brigade (Until 2016)

The Paratroopers Brigade "Almogávares" VI (Spanish: Brigada "Almogávares" VI de Paracaidistas - BOP PAC VI) is an Multipurpose Organic Brigade (Spanish: Brigada Orgánica Polivalente - BOP) of the Spanish Army assigned to the Division "San Marcial". The brigade is named after the Almogavars, a class of light infantry soldier originating in the Crown of Aragon in the latter phase of the Reconquista. The brigade was called the Paratroopers Light Infantry Brigade "Almogávares" VI Spanish: Brigada de Infantería Ligera Paracaidista "Almogávares" VI until 2015.

== History ==
Raised in 1953 as one of the most elite units of the Army, the brigade's battalions were named Bandera (Flag/lit. "banner" - an archaic 16th century term) as Spanish Legion personnel formed part of the brigade's first units. The unit's first combat jump took place on 25 November 1957 when 75 troopers landed in Tiliun from five Junkers Ju 52 transports during the Ifni War with Morocco. Formed as just a single battalion, it became a fully fledged brigade in 1965 with Brigadier General Julio Coloma Gallegos as its first commander.

== Combat capabilities ==
The BRIPAC is a unit with a high degree of professionalism, morale and training, ready to deploy at any time and place.

- Rapid deployment.
- High availability - two GT, s.
- Joint operations
- Involvement vertical.
- HALO / HAHO (high altitude parachute jump).
- Operations developed land.
- Peacekeeping operations
- Limited fire support

=== CIMIC Capabilities (Civil-Military Cooperation) ===
- Evacuation Control Center.
- Reception Center (refugee camp)
- Humanitarian corridors
- Civil Support Emergency Planning
- Public information

== Organisation and mission ==
Originally the brigade comprised the following units:

- Brigade Headquarters
- 3x Parachute Banderas
- Airborne Artillery Group (GACAPAC)
- Parachute Engineers Battalion (BZPAC VI)
- Airborne Logistics Group (GLPAC VI)
- Airborne Signals Company (CIATRANSPAC VI)

During the Spanish Army's 2015 reform, the brigade was remodelled as a multipurpose brigade with the same structure and equipment as brigades "Rey Alfonso XIII" II of the Legion, "Galicia" VII, and "Canarias" XVI, with only the Bandera "Roger de Flor" I/4 unit retaining sole paratrooper status.

- Paratroopers Brigade "Almogávares" VI, in Paracuellos de Jarama
  - Headquarters Battalion VI, in Paracuellos de Jarama
  - Cavalry Regiment "Lusitania" No. 8, in Marines
    - Light Armored Cavalry Group "Sagunto" I/8 (Centauro tank destroyers and VEC-M1 reconnaissance vehicles)
  - Parachute Infantry Regiment "Nápoles" No. 4, in Paracuellos de Jarama
    - Paratrooper Infantry Bandera "Roger de Flor" I/4
    - Protected Infantry Bandera "Roger de Lauria" II/4 (RG-31 Nyala and VAMTAC ST5 vehicles)
  - Infantry Regiment "Zaragoza" No. 5, in Alcantarilla
    - Protected Infantry Bandera "Ortiz de Zárate" III/5 (BMR-M1 armored personnel carriers)
  - Field Artillery Group VI (Airborne), in Paracuellos de Jarama (L-118A1 towed howitzers)
  - Engineer Battalion VI, in Paracuellos de Jarama
  - Logistic Group VI, in Paracuellos de Jarama

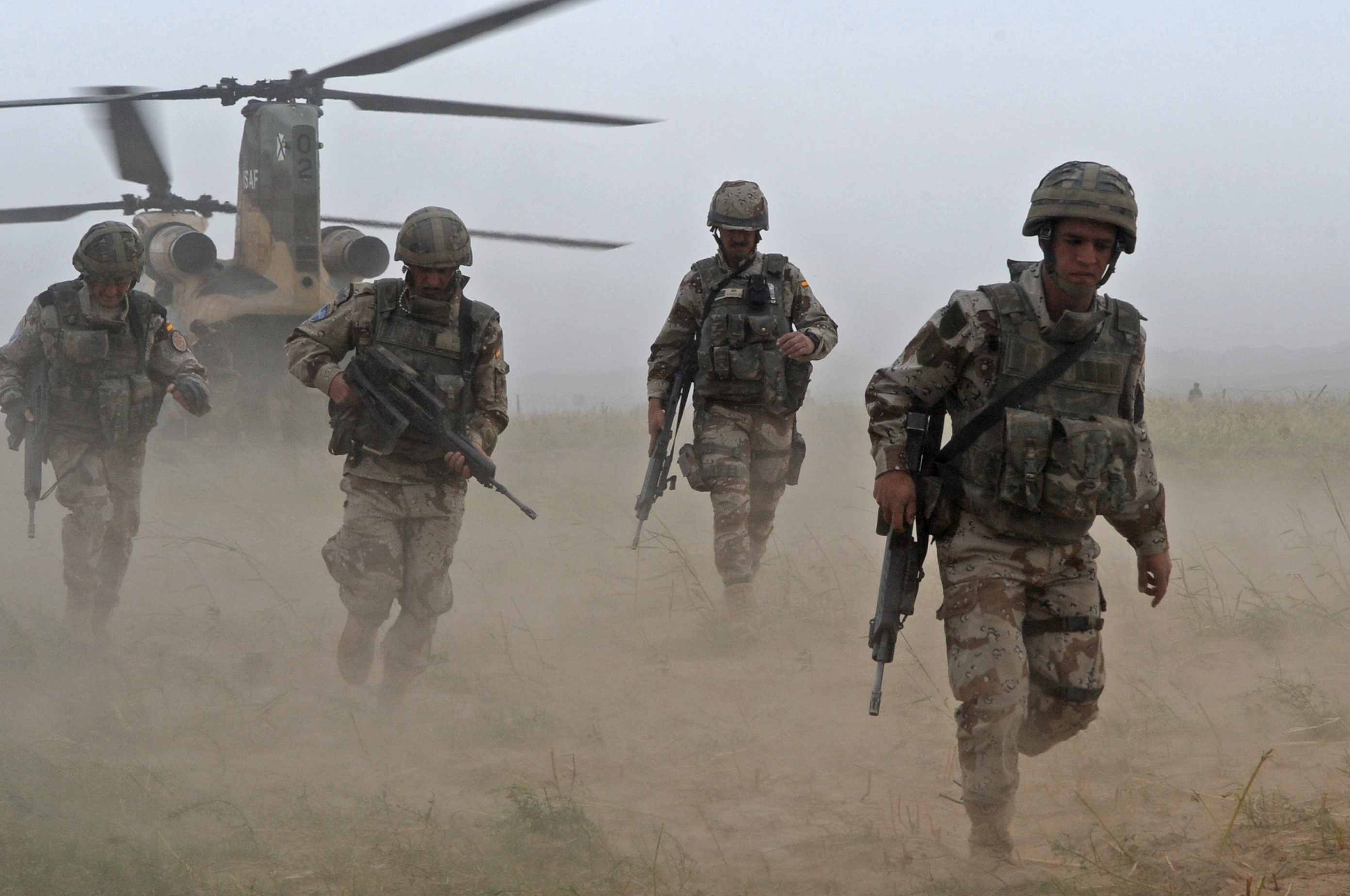
Spanish soldiers of the Parachute Brigade in Afghanistan.

== Training ==
Training prepares its members to perform the following types of missions:

- Airborne operations
- Airmobile operations
- Noncombatant evacuation (NEO).
- Operations abroad
- Standard infantry combat operations
- Army parachute capabilities

=== Courses ===
- Continuing Education Day: Exercises of about 30 hours in order to perform a demanding and intensive instruction in all tactical positions.
- Alfa-Exercises: Exercises four days used to complete the instruction section and coordinate the preparation of the various units of the Company.
- Beta-Exercises: Exercises of varying length where the Flag type unit / group coordinates the development achieved by the Cia. and integrates as a whole unit, thus achieving the tactical capabilities needed to fulfill the tasks assigned.
- Bilateral Exercises: Exercises paratroopers cooperation with other countries that serve for the exchange of knowledge, skills and experiences.
- Other Courses: In addition to the above described, the BRIPAC develops other exercises and manoeuvres with other Army units in order to unify the operating procedures of the various support units such as Practice School of Artillery, Sappers or signal corps.

== Casualties ==
BRIPAC Casualties
Type	Count
KIA	47 (Note: Including 6 KIA's in Lebanon in March 2007, and 3 in Afghanistan; 1 in 2006 and 2 in 2007)
In accidents	71
Deceased on active duty	65
Total	183
