= Caracuel de Calatrava =

Coordinates: 38°51′N 4°04′W

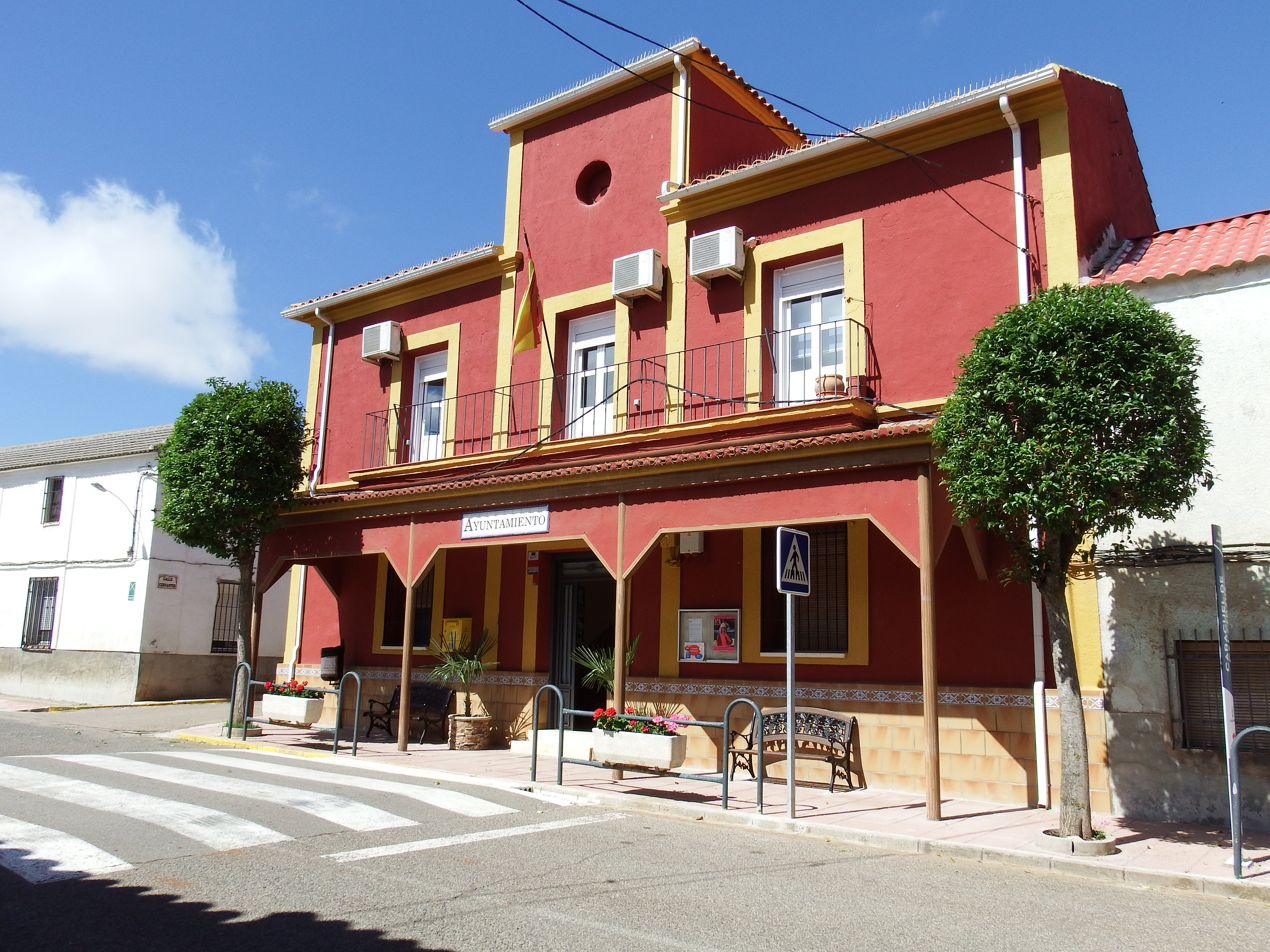
Street of Caracuel de Calatrava

Caracuel de Calatrava is a municipality in Ciudad Real, Castile-La Mancha, Spain. It has a population of 159.
