= La Yesa =

- Municipality and town
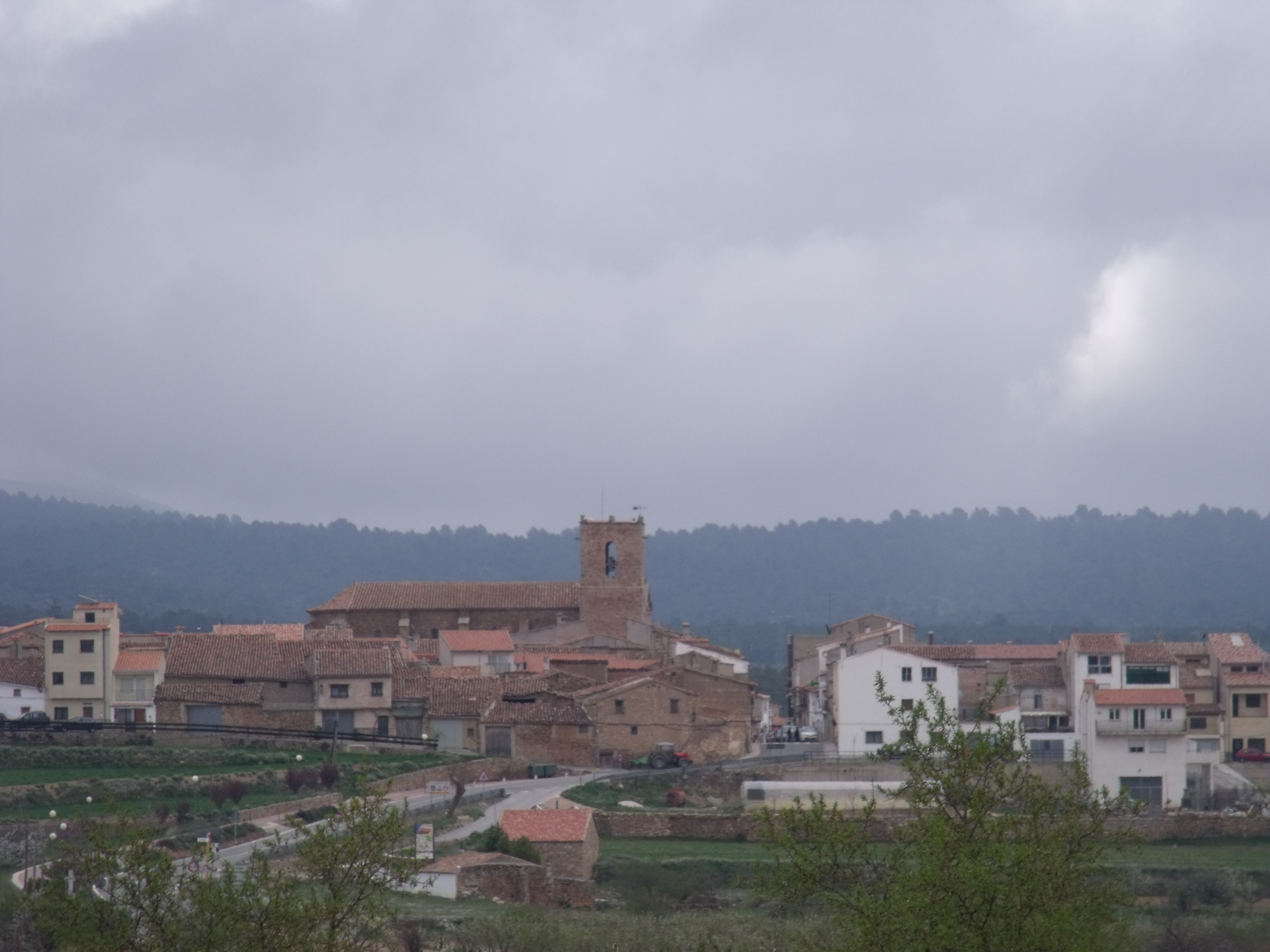

- Coat of arms

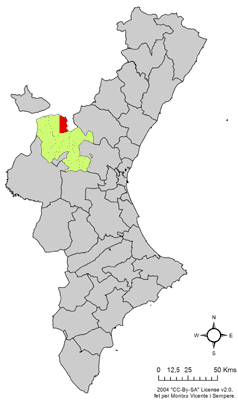
- Municipal location in Valencia

- Location in Spain
- Coordinates: 39°53′28″N 0°57′44″W
- Country: Spain
- Autonomous community: Valencian Community
- Province: Valencia
- Comarca: Los Serranos
- Judicial district: Llíria
- Founded: Independent from 1587

Government
  - Alcalde: Miguel Ángel Sanahuja

Area
  - Total: 84.7 km^{2} (32.7 sq mi)
- Elevation: 1,166 m (3,825 ft)

Population (2025-01-01)
  - Total: 246
  - Density: 2.90/km^{2} (7.52/sq mi)
- Demonym: Yesano/a
- Time zone: UTC+1 (CET)
  - Summer (DST): UTC+2 (CEST)
- Postal code: 46178
- Official language(s): Spanish
- Website: Official website

La Yesa is a small town and municipality in the comarca of Los Serranos in the Valencian Community, Spain. The name in Valencian is La Iessa, but the local language is Spanish, not Valencian.

== Geography ==
The municipality covers an area of 84.7 square kilometres (32.7 sq mi) and as of 2011 had a population of 265 people. La Yesa is located 21 kilometres (13 mi) north of Chelva and 80 kilometres (50 mi) northwest of Valencia, off the provincial road CV-35 which links with the CV-345. It borders Abejuela of Aragon to the northeast. At an altitude of 1,166 metres (3,825 ft) above sea level, the climate is dry continental, resulting in hot summers and cold winters (sometimes below 0 °C), where there is frequent snow.

== History ==
Location in the comarca of Los Serranos

The archaeological remains found in La Yesa attest to a settlement during Roman times. Alpuente and La Yesa were also coveted by the Cid, who seized the land in the late eleventh century. In the Muslim period it was part of the Taifa Kingdom of Alpuente(ninth century), being conquered by James I in 1236 and delivered to Juan de Auñón in 1238. In 1583, King Philip II of Spain granted the status of University and in 1587 it was declared an independent village.

== Economy ==
The municipal economy revolves around agriculture and livestock. In 1611 wheat was reportedly sold for 110 sous in La Yesa. The town has a growing tourism sector on weekends and holidays, which has fueled the growth of several shops and bars. Kaolin mining and construction are the main industries. The municipality has close ties with the neighboring municipality of Alpuente, the town of which lies to the southwest of La Yesa.

== Notable landmarks ==
Notable hermitages include Ermita de San Juan, Ermita de San Roque, Ermita de San Sebastián (in disrepair) and the ruined Ermita de Nª Sª de Belén. The principal church is the Iglesia de Nª Sª de los Ángeles, which was completed in 1622 in the Renaissance style with a square tower. The church was burned down in 1840 following the Carlist Wars but was subsequently reconstructed, completed in 1852. To the left of the façade, recessed, stands the sturdy bell tower of ashlar masonry. Next to the Ermita de San Roque is the Monument to the Carlists, a cross composed of parts of a machine gun on an octagonal stone.

== See also ==
- List of municipalities in Valencia
