= Cheste =

- Municipality
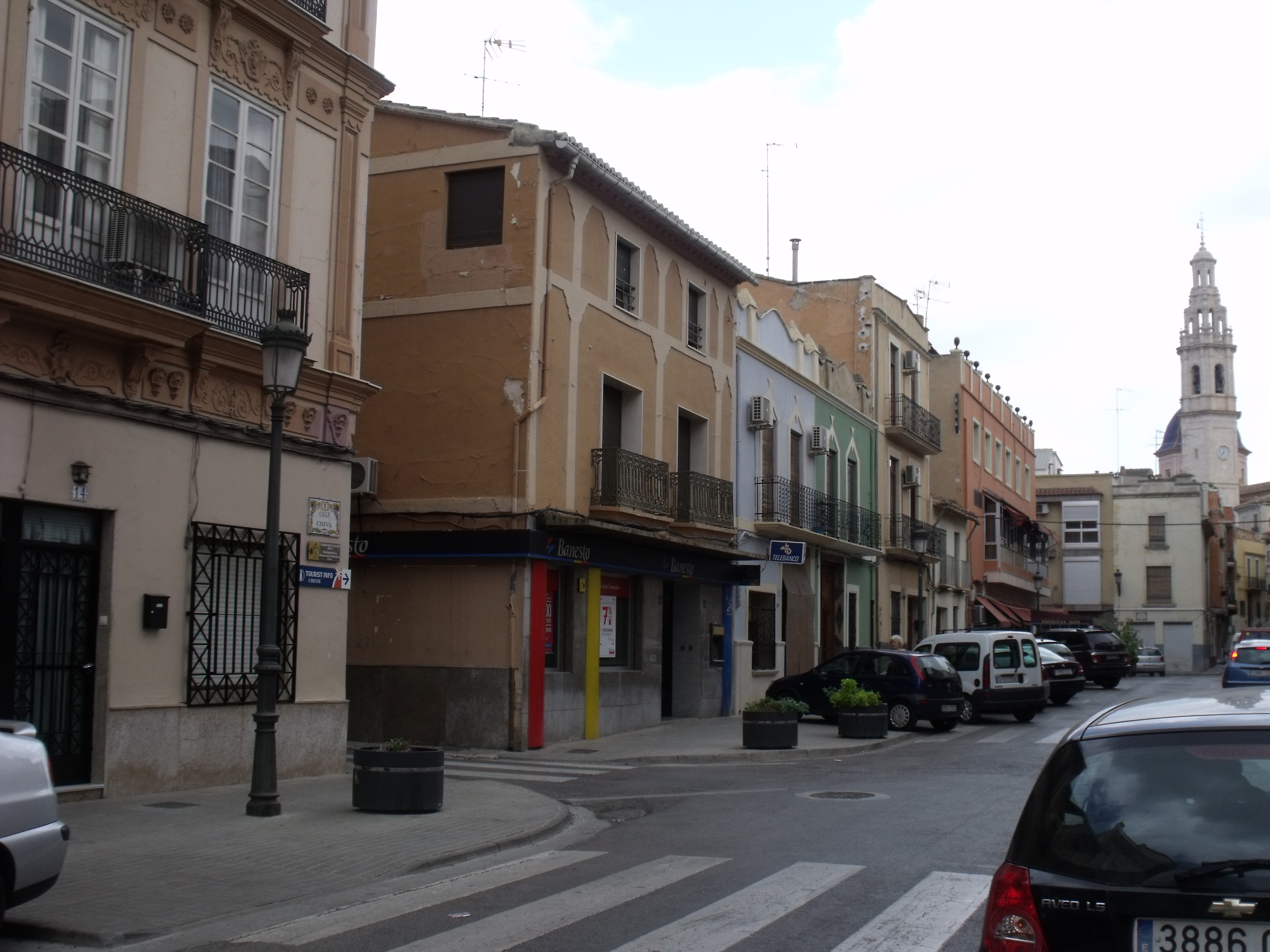

- Coat of arms

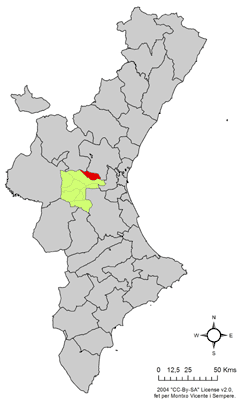

- Location in Spain
- Coordinates: 39°28′47″N 0°41′4″W
- Country: Spain
- Autonomous community: Valencian Community
- Province: Valencia
- Comarca: Hoya de Buñol
- Judicial district: Chiva

Government
  - Alcalde: David Domenech Perez(2007)

Area
  - Total: 71.40 km^{2} (27.57 sq mi)
- Elevation: 218 m (715 ft)

Population (2025-01-01)
  - Total: 8,951
  - Density: 125.4/km^{2} (324.7/sq mi)
- Demonym: Chestano/a
- Time zone: UTC+1 (CET)
  - Summer (DST): UTC+2 (CEST)
- Postal code: 46380
- Official language(s): Spanish
- Website: Official website

Cheste is a municipality in the comarca of Hoya de Buñol in the Valencian Community, Spain, located 26 km from the capital Valencia. The Valencian name is Xest, but the local language is Spanish rather than Valencian.

== History ==
According to the Valencian historian Escolano, the first settlers of the region of Cheste were members of Iberian tribes belonging to the old Edetania. This view is supported by numerous remains, particularly those of El Castillarejo (Iberian ceramics and spear points from the Bronze Age).

The Cheste hoard, a cache of gold jewellery and silver coins, was discovered in the locality of La Safa in 1864. The presence of Carthaginian coinage issued by the Barcids alongside an early Roman denarius implies the hoard dates to around the time of the Second Punic War.

== Sport ==
About five kilometers to the east of the town is the "Circuit de Valencia", a motor sport race track which has hosted the Valencian Community motorcycle Grand Prix since 1999.

== Bordering localities ==
Chiva, Gestalgar, Bugarra, Pedralba, Vilamarxant, Riba-roja de Túria, and Loriguilla

== See also ==
- List of municipalities in Valencia
