= Aras de los Olmos =

- Municipality
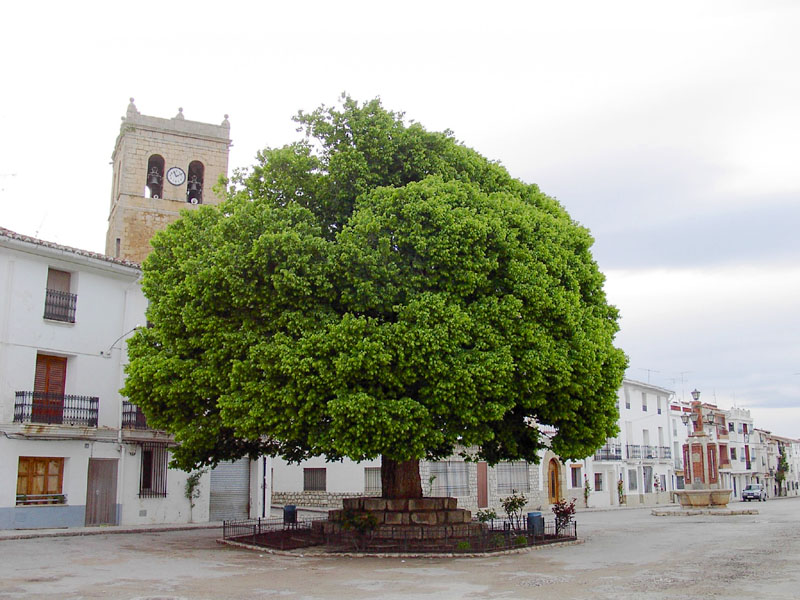
- Town hall

- Coat of arms

- Location in Spain
- Coordinates: 39°55′32″N 1°8′1″W
- Country: Spain
- Autonomous community: Valencian Community
- Province: Valencia
- Comarca: Los Serranos
- Judicial district: Llíria

Government
  - Alcalde: Rafael Giménez

Area
  - Total: 76 km^{2} (29 sq mi)
- Elevation: 936 m (3,071 ft)

Population (2025-01-01)
  - Total: 401
  - Density: 5.3/km^{2} (14/sq mi)
- Demonym: Areño/a
- Time zone: UTC+1 (CET)
  - Summer (DST): UTC+2 (CEST)
- Postal code: 46179
- Official language(s): Spanish
- Website: Official website

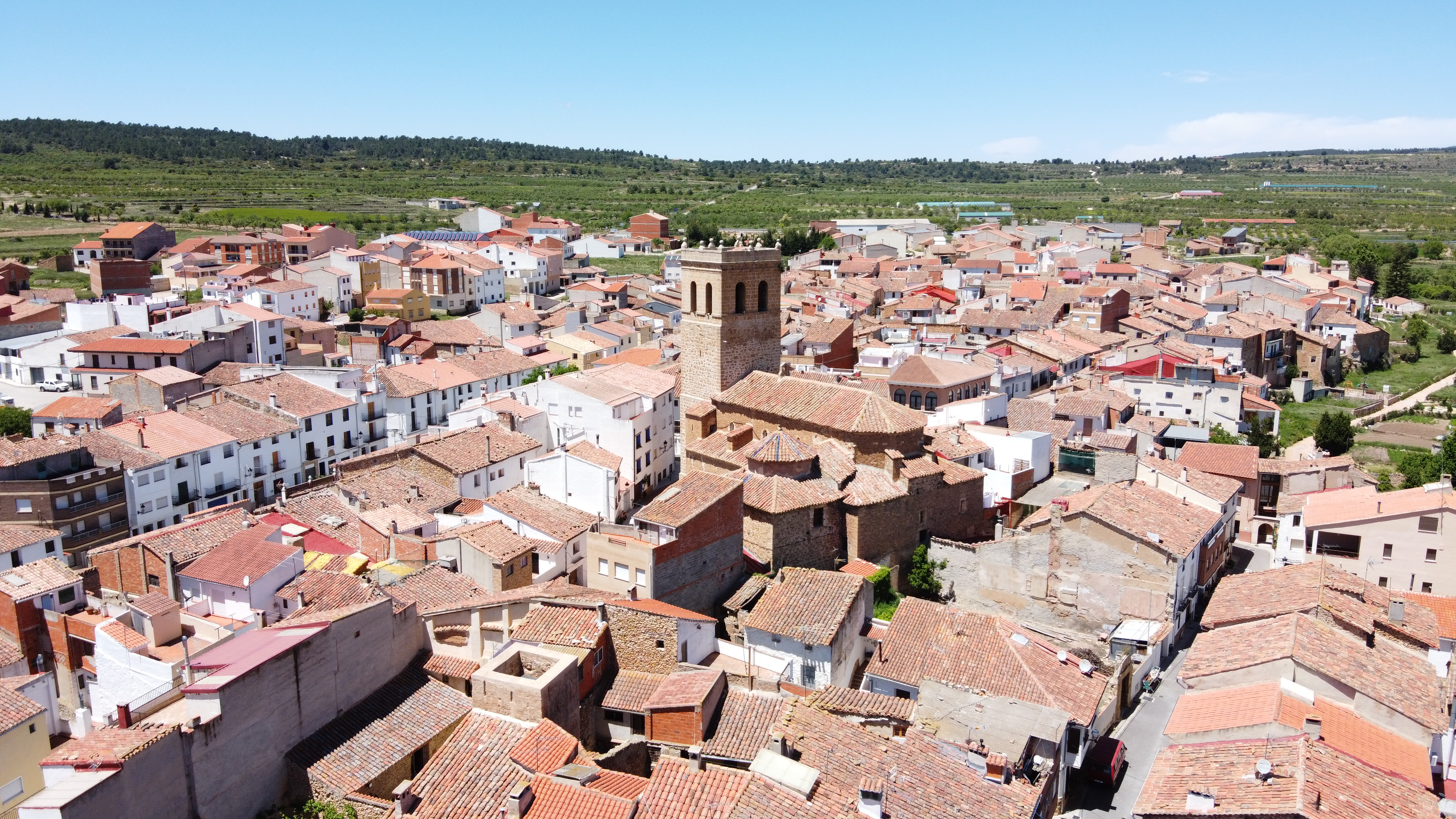
Aerial view of the village

Aras de los Olmos (until September 2001 Aras de Alpuente) is a municipality of Valencia, Spain. Belonging to the province of Valencia, in the region of Los Serranos.

== Geography ==
Located northwest of the province, between the rivers Turia and Arcos, its surface is very irregular. Have some in the central plains, but predominantly mountainous, with deep ravines. The heights are: Santa Catalina Muela (1,315 m), Lily Fountain (1398), Tejerías (1181) and Mampedroso (1207). The Turia river crosses from north to south through the western sector. Flows to the river, and the arches, gorges de la Hoz, del Carril, and Regajo Spider.

The town is situated in the midst of a vast plain, northwest of the Sierra del Sabinar, having a length of 75 km^{2}. The town can be reached from Valencia, taking the CV-35.

The climate: due to its altitude, this land has cold winters and hot summers, although with mild nights. The snow can sometimes be seen, forming beautiful landscapes.

== Bordering towns ==
In the municipality of Aras de los Olmos, 6.5 km to the north, is the village of Losilla de Aras. It limits with the following localities: to the east with Alpuente, to the south with Titaguas, (both in the province of Valencia), to the north with Arcos de las Salinas, in the province of Teruel, Aragón, and to the west with Santa Cruz de Moya, in the province of Cuenca, Castilla-La Mancha.

== History ==
The town of Aras was populated by the Iberians. Circa 154 B.C. it had already been occupied by Rome, belonging successively to Hispania Citerior, Tarraconensis and Cartaginensis. After 300 years of the Visigothic Kingdom, the peninsula is conquered by the Arabs, who establish the Caliphate of Córdoba. The dissolution of the caliphate gave rise to the Taifa kingdoms, with Aras belonging to the Taifa of Alpuente, between 1030 and 1092, and later to the Almohad empire. Reconquered by King Jaume I in 1236, it was repopulated by Aragonese. Jaime I in 1240 ascribed it to the municipal term of Alpuente, with the name of Aras de Alpuente. It passed, by royal donation, to the Order of Montesa in 1318. On May 11, 1728, King Felipe V granted the population the Royal Certificate of Constitution of Villa de Aras, with the category of Royal and Independent Villa.

On July 26, 2001, the Valencian Government approved the change of name of the municipality. It would no longer be Aras de Alpuente, a town to which it was historically linked, but Aras de los Olmos, its current name.

== Demography ==
Demography evolution
1990	1992	1994	1996	1998	2000	2002	2004	2005	2007	2014	2016	2018	2021
494	428	433	420	397	398	367	375	391	393	386	381	374	374

The population is highly seasonal, hosting large variations between the winter and summer seasons, going from 350 inhabitants during the coldest months to 1,200 during the summer months.

== Business ==
- The fundamental economic base is agriculture, mainly rainfed, in which cereals are grown fallow, alternating wheat with rye, almonds and vines. Irrigation barely covers domestic needs and is located near the urban core; the waters of the sources are used, by means of rafts, as well as those of the Regajo ravine. Late frosts, quite frequent, reduce the production of grapes and almonds. On the other hand, livestock farming is also highly relevant, concentrated on the outskirts of the town with closed enclosures, and which is mainly based on cuniculture and poultry farming.
- In recent years, the production of honey has been growing, converted into a typical product of the town, as well as truffles or saffron.
- Rural tourism must be highlighted, which is becoming more and more important in the economic activity of the municipality, with a rural hotel with more than one hundred beds and several rural houses.

== Monuments ==
- Parish Church. Dedicated to the Virgin of the Angels, it was completed in the mid-16th century. The main door is in the Renaissance style, with fluted columns and three niches above, in which it seems that there was some sculpture. The back door is in Romanesque style and the interior is Baroque, so it is decorated almost entirely with the sgraffito technique, very well preserved. On the altar there are two representations, one of Santa Bárbara and the other of Saint Catherine of Alexandria, patron saint of the town, one on each side, leaving the Virgin of the Angels in the center.
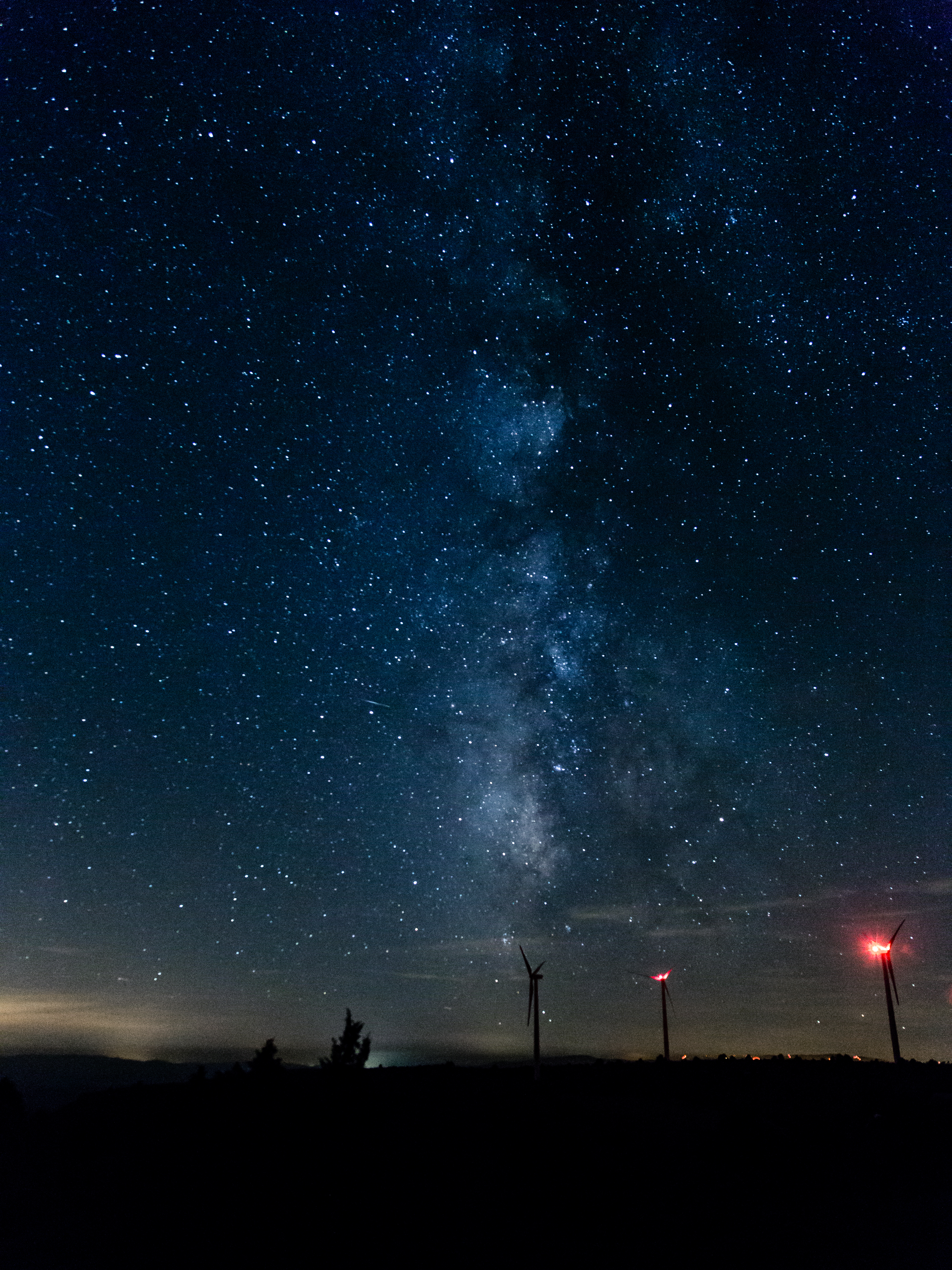
  Starry night in Aras de los Olmos
- The elm tree in Plaza del Olmo is the meeting point for the town's inhabitants. The current one was planted in 2006, succeeding another specimen that was in the same place for 300 years, and that died from graphiosis. The elm tree in the square has become the emblem of the town, and is used as a logo by various associations and businesses in the municipality. It is very common to find people of all ages resting under its shade, sitting on the heptagonal steps that surround it.
- Hermitage of Santa Catalina. At 1174 meters above sea level, there is the sanctuary that has given its name to the mountain. Dates from the 18th century. It is a building also decorated in part with the sgraffito technique. It has an inn attached, currently in disuse, next to which a fountain with five spouts flows.
- Hermitage of the Blood of the Holy Christ. Simple construction prior to the 17th century. From 1621, according to the inscription on the entrance bracket. It has a square base that had the entire roof and railings made of wood, although it was burned during the Spanish Civil War. It only opens twice a year, on Palm Sunday and Good Friday.
- Arabic Tower. It dates from the X-XI centuries, built during the Taifa kingdoms. The tower was surrounded by a completely square wall, placing the town and the land outside it, which was used as a grain store. If there were warnings of danger, it was used as a refuge for the inhabitants of the municipality, since it also contained a well. In addition, it was also used as a watchtower.
- Casa del Balcón Esquina or Casa de los Monterde. Stone manor house with the peculiarity of having a corner balcony, one of the few in the Valencian Community. This house belonged to the Templars and, once the Order was dissolved, it belonged to the lords of Monterde.
- Mediaeval oven. It was conceived as such by Pere el Cerimoniós in 1351, and was in operation until 1975. This oven was for community use.
- Boarded up orchards. Arabic in style, they date from the 16th century. All are closed by stone walls and have a wooden door for access. They are separated by narrow alleys and connected by a network of ditches.
- The Blazons and coats of arms of Aras de los Olmos, which are distributed throughout different parts of the town, are of cultural interest, registered by means of a generic declaration.
- Losillasaurus, life-size dinosaur located next to the ethnobotanical garden. It was a giant species whose remains were found near the Losilla village.
- Castillo de la Muela, Iberian site located in the Muela de Santa Catalina consisting of an old defensive wall.

== Culture ==
- In its municipal term there are several astronomical observatories, two of them amateur and one professional: the amateur observatory of La Cambra (OLC), located within the population; the astronomical observatory of the Valencian Astronomy Association, the Alto Turia Astronomical Center (CAAT); and the Aras del Olmo Observatory (OAO), of the University of Valencia, the latter two on the Muela de Santa Catalina, within the wind farm. Together with the neighboring professional observatory of the CEFCA (OAJ) in Javalambre, Arcos de las Salinas and the educational Cosmophysics observatory in Titaguas, they make up the Los Serranos-Javalambre astronomical park. There is another observatory within the Big History center, located within the municipality, which also has a planetarium. On the other hand, the municipality has the Starlight Destination certification, which accredits it as one of the best European skies for stargazing.
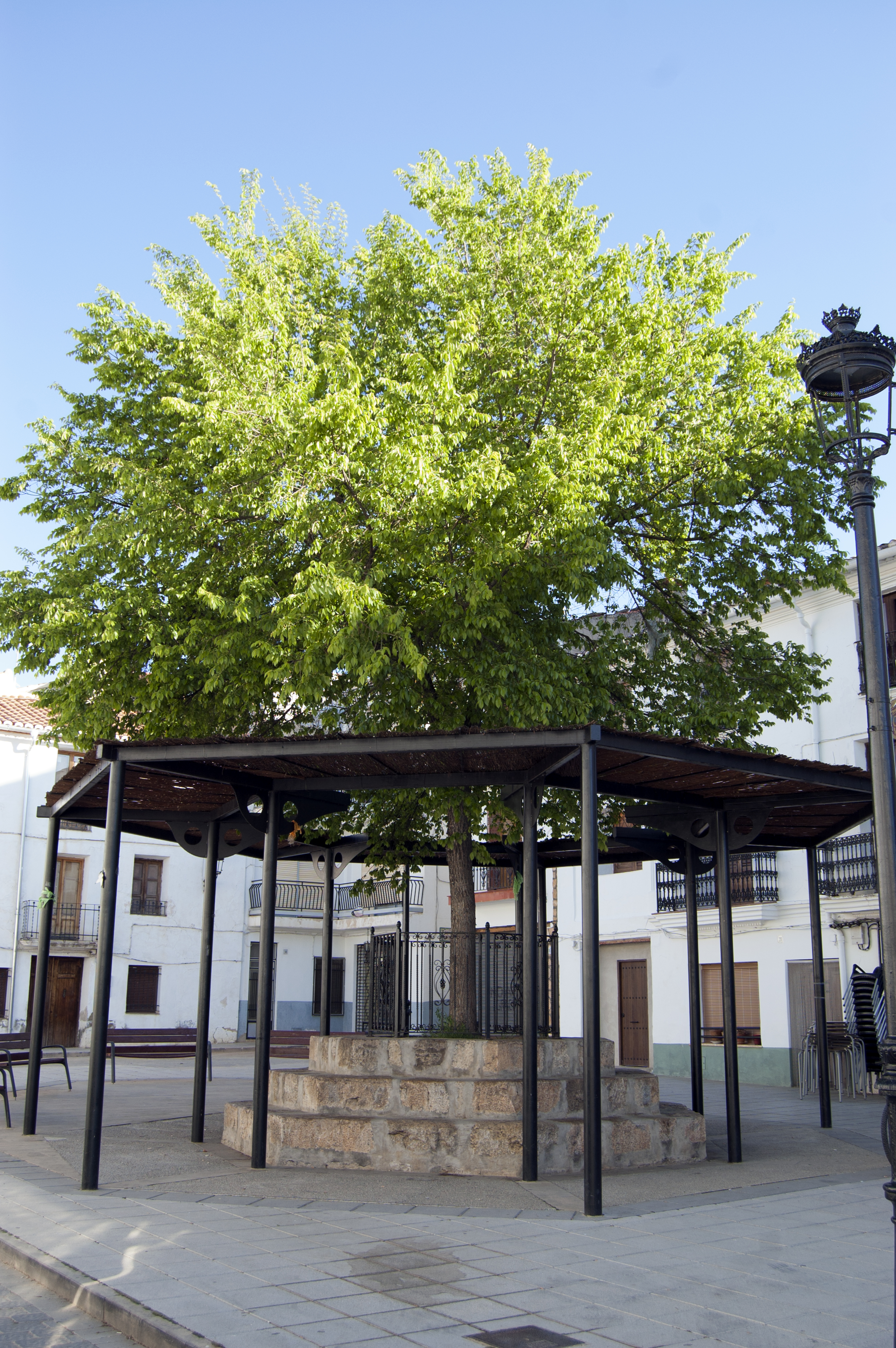
  Main square (Plaza del Olmo)
- The Francisco Moreno Mesas Municipal Archaeological Museum, founded in 1981 by Francisco himself, a former school teacher, and Eugenio Moltó, a former city council official. It is located on the first floor of the Ecomuseum. The exposed elements were found in the outings that the teacher made with his students, in which they began collecting samples of fossils, more and more numerous and that filled a deposit, the saturation of which led to the creation of the museum. Among the outputs, it is worth highlighting the findings of dinosaur remains. The museum has objects from the Stone Age, Bronze Age, Iberian, Roman, Visigothic, Arab and medieval periods, and paleontological material such as dinosaur parts, fossils and minerals, among others.
- The Ethnobotanical Garden, has 300 square meters destined to be a didactic and informative space that aims to make the visitor aware of the set of aromatic and medicinal plants most used in traditional cuisine thanks to the Mediterranean climate and mountains, such as rosemary, sage, oregano, or thyme.
- The municipality, together with others in the surrounding area, form the Alto Turia Biosphere Reserve.
- The Municipal Theater has multiple uses, from sports classes to talks and colloquiums, including theatrical performances, movies and presentations.
- In the town there are several associations dedicated to different fields, which carry out activities throughout the year, whether they are cultural such as music, theater or astronomy, or sports such as cycling. There are also associations of retired people, youth or women, among others.

== Local festivals ==
- Saint Mark. It is celebrated every April 25. The popular gachas in the square are typical and the Pilgrimage to the hermitage of Santa Catalina, in honor of the saint, closes the festivities.
- Summer parties. They are celebrated in the second fortnight of August. During the week of festivities, multiple activities are carried out such as popular meals, concerts, traditional games, workshops and contests.
- Fat Parties. They are celebrated every seven years in honor of Saint Catherine, and are of special significance and popular appeal. They are extraordinary that they last 15 days and that they have the collaboration of the most men and women of the village, young people between 16 and 23 years old who use the typical costume in different acts. A religious act to highlight is the procession through the streets of the town with the image of the saint a month before the festivities begin, having lowered it from the hermitage, and taking place the Moors and Christians Entrance, popularly known as Entramoro. This is a play where the fight between good and evil is staged, where good is defeated by the troops of evil, but this is finally defeated by the intercession of Saint Catherine, converting the Muslim troops to Christianity. During the 15 days, many activities of all kinds are carried out.
- Pilgrimage to the Sanctuary of Santa Catalina. It is celebrated every November 25. The pilgrimage in the hermitage of Santa Catalina closes the festivities of popular acts that recover dishes of the native gastronomy such as gachas, in the Plaza de los Serranos, and other cultural performances.

== Gastronomy ==
The location of this region makes the traditional cuisine have great influences in Aragonese and Castilian:

- Gachas
- Pot of meat and vegetables (it is called "olla de pueblo")
- Gazpacho de monte
- Lomo de Orza
- Sausages
- Cocido
- Trout
- Caldero own meat hunting in the area
- Orelletes
- Floury
- Mostillo

== See also ==
- List of municipalities in Valencia
