= Vicente Masip =

Spanish painter

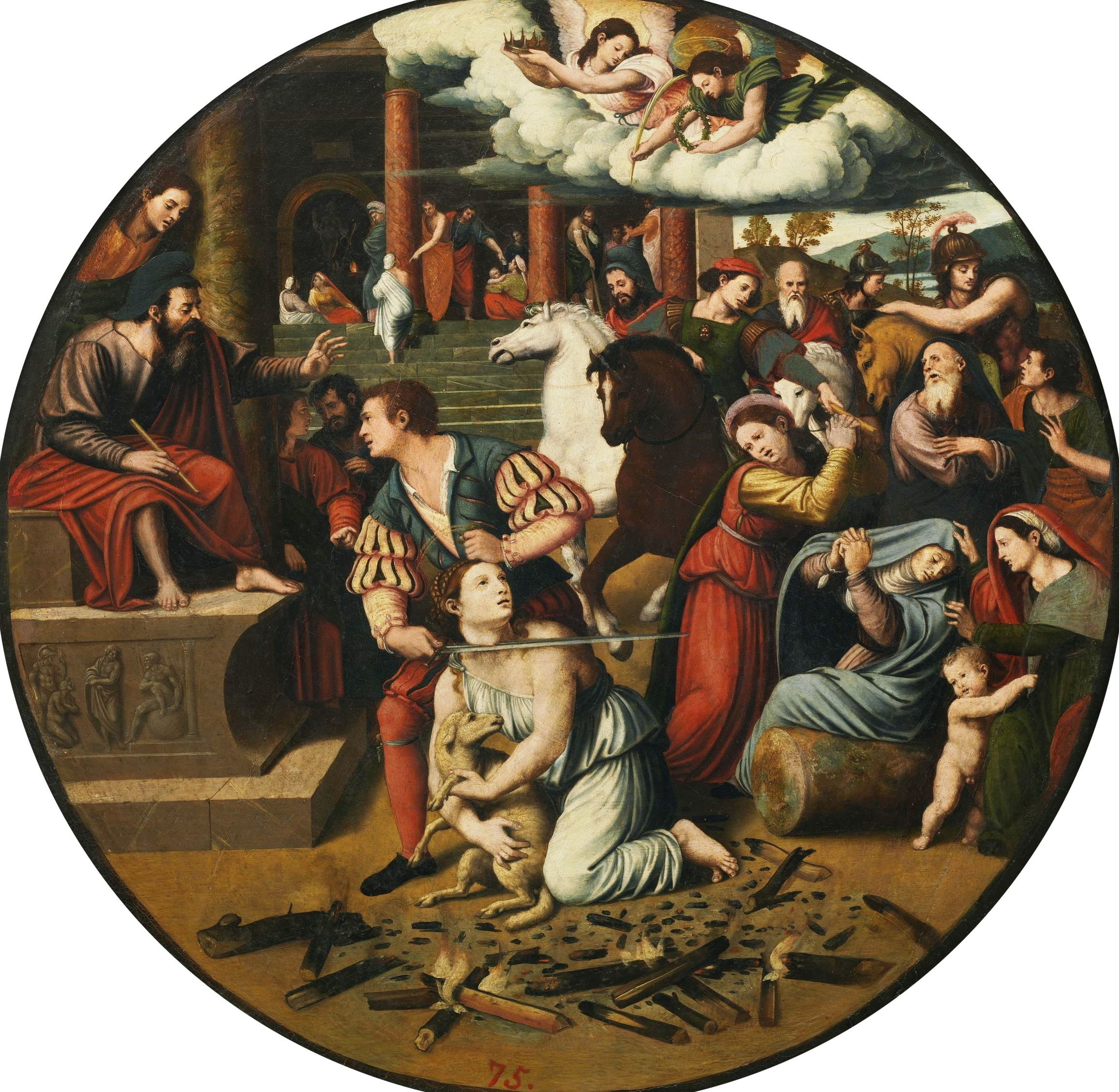
Martyrdom of St. Ines. Museo del Prado, Madrid.

Vicente Masip (also Maçip) (1475 in Andilla – 1545 in Valencia) was a Spanish painter of the Renaissance period. His son was Vicente Juan Masip, and his grandson was named Vicente Masip Comes, also known as Vicent de Joanes.

Born in Andilla, he was influenced by Paolo de San Leocadio and Rodrigo de Osona on the Quattrocento style. He is considered a Quattrocento painter. One of his early works was the altarpiece of Porta-Coeli in the Museu de Belles Arts de València. He was also responsible for the old high altar of the Segorbe Cathedral between 1529 and 1532, perhaps already counting on the help of his son Juan, which would explain the change in the orientation of his painting. He is also attributed the altarpiece of the Virgin of the Remedy of the Church of San Bartolomé de Benicarlo. It is a painting of the Virgin and Child Enthroned surrounded by various saints.

The Museo del Prado owns, among others, two of his paintings representing the Visitation and the Martyrdom of St. Agnes, executed for the chapel of St. Thomas of Villanova in the convent of San Julián de Valencia, probably commissioned by the venerable John Bautista Agnesio. The Renaissance stage on which the action is shows influences of the boards of the Acts of the Apostles of Raphael, who was known through engravings. Somewhat overshadowed by the fame of his son who had more an emotional and sweet style, but certainly better equipped, experts doubt the attribution of some works between parent and child, especially those who had attributed the father.
