= Simon de Rojas =

Simon de Rojas may refer to:

- Simón de Roxas Clemente y Rubio (1777-1827), Spanish botanist
- St. Simón de Rojas (1552-1624), Spanish priest, theologian and a spiritual writer
