= Sierra de Utiel =

Mountain range in Spain

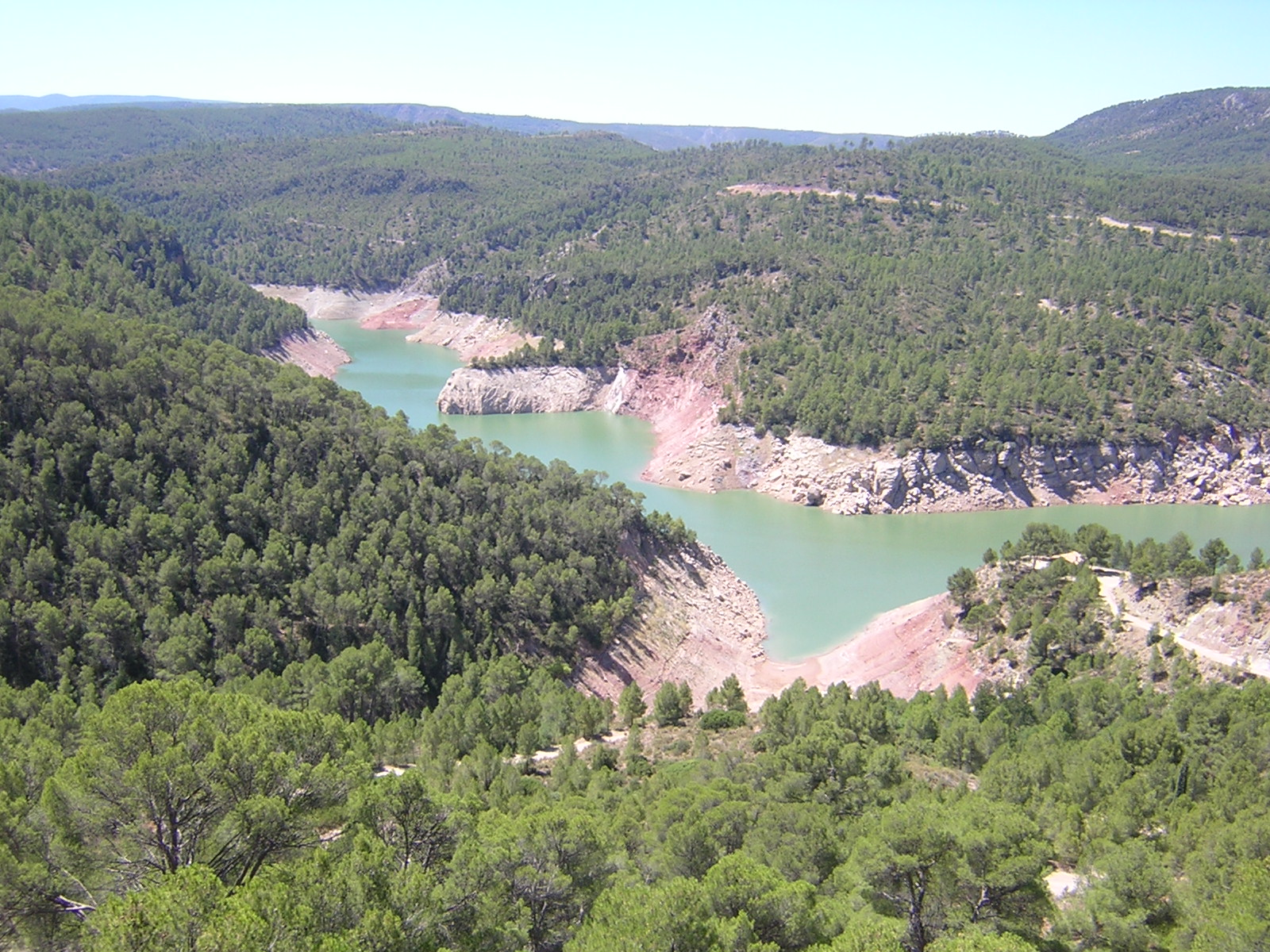
- The Benagéber reservoir, in the Utiel Range area

Highest point
- Elevation: 1,306 m (4,285 ft)
- Listing: Mountains of the Valencian Community
- Coordinates: 39°37′16″N 0°58′48″W

Geography
- Location within Spain
- Location: Plana d'Utiel and Serrans, Valencian Community
- Parent range: Iberian System, Southeastern end

Geology
- Mountain type: Karstic (Jurassic)

Climbing
- Easiest route: Drive from Utiel, Sinarcas, Loriguilla, Domeño, Chera, Benagéber or Calles

Sierra de Utiel (Valencian: Serra d'Utiel) is a 16.45 km (10 mi) long mountain range in the Alt Palància, Alt Millars and Plana Baixa comarcas, Valencian Community, Spain. Its highest point is the 1,306 m high El Remedio (Valencian: El Remei). There is often snow in the winter.

== Minor ranges ==
There are four ranges running parallel to each other:

- Sierra del Negrete, also known as Sierra del Remedio (Valencian: Serra del Remei), the main range, with the 1,306 m high El Remedio (Valencian: El Remei), where there is a shrine and the Cerrochico (1,223 m).
- The Sierra de Utiel proper with the 1,112 m high Cabeza del Fraile
- The Sierra de Juan Navarro with the 1,177 m high Cinco Pinos, the Juan Navarro (1,167 m) and the Ropé (1,140 m), where both former ranges merge to meet the tectonic depression of Chera.
- The Sierra de la Atalaya, whose highest summit is La Atalaya (1,157 m).

The Utiel Range has been declared a Site of Community Importance (SCI).

== See also ==
- Mountains of the Valencian Community
