= Benagéber =

- Municipality
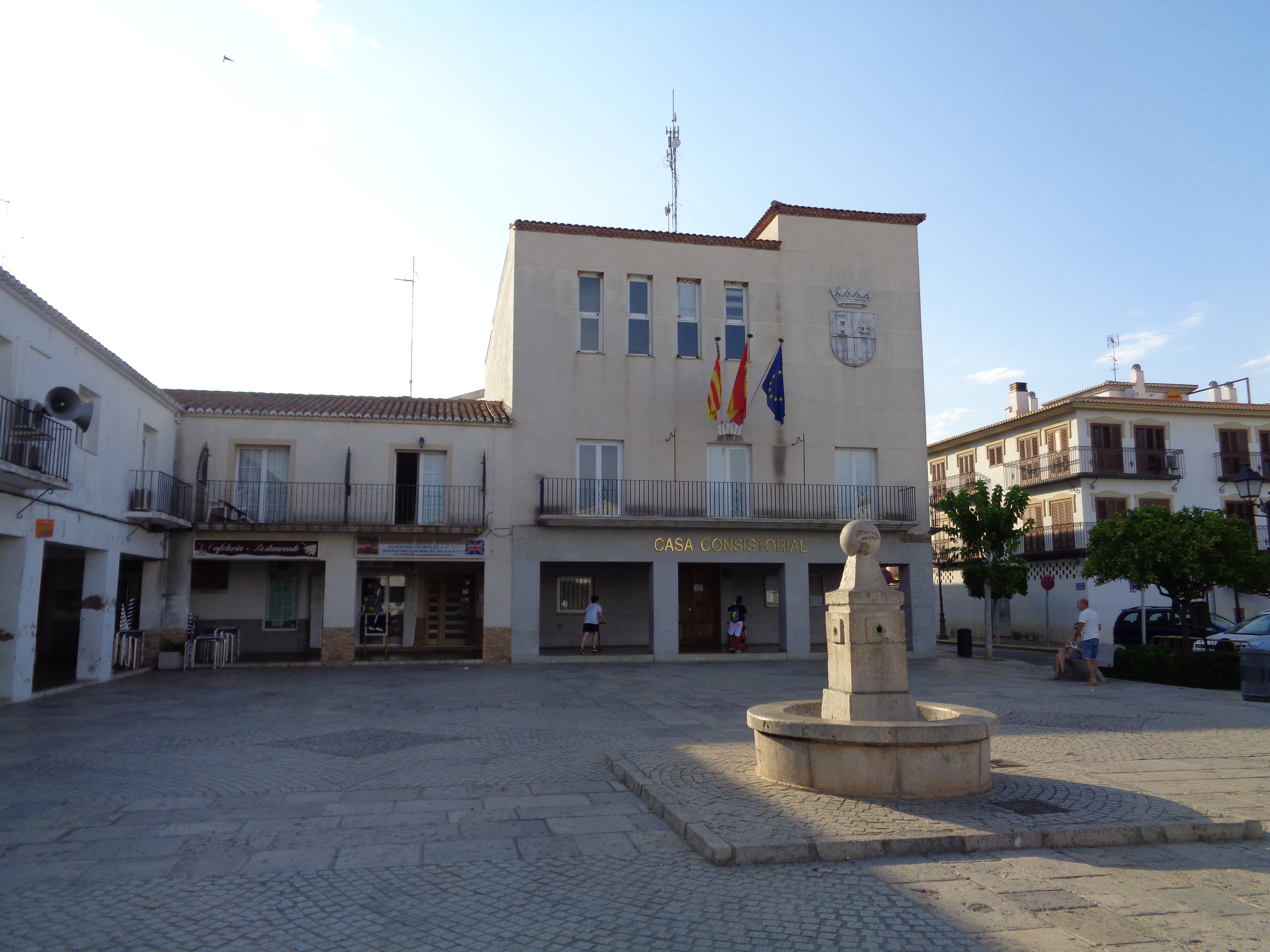
- Town hall

- Flag Coat of arms

- Location in Spain
- Coordinates: 39°42′26″N 1°6′2″W
- Country: Spain
- Autonomous community: Valencian Community
- Province: Valencia
- Comarca: Los Serranos
- Judicial district: Llíria

Government
  - Alcalde: Rafael Darijo Escamilla

Area
  - Total: 69.8 km^{2} (26.9 sq mi)
- Elevation: 715 m (2,346 ft)

Population (2025-01-01)
  - Total: 176
  - Density: 2.52/km^{2} (6.53/sq mi)
- Demonym: Benagebero/a
- Time zone: UTC+1 (CET)
  - Summer (DST): UTC+2 (CEST)
- Postal code: 46173
- Official language(s): Spanish
- Website: Official website

Benagéber is a municipality in the comarca of Los Serranos in the Valencian Community, Spain.

== See also ==
- Sierra de Utiel
- List of municipalities in Valencia
