= Alcublas =

- Municipality
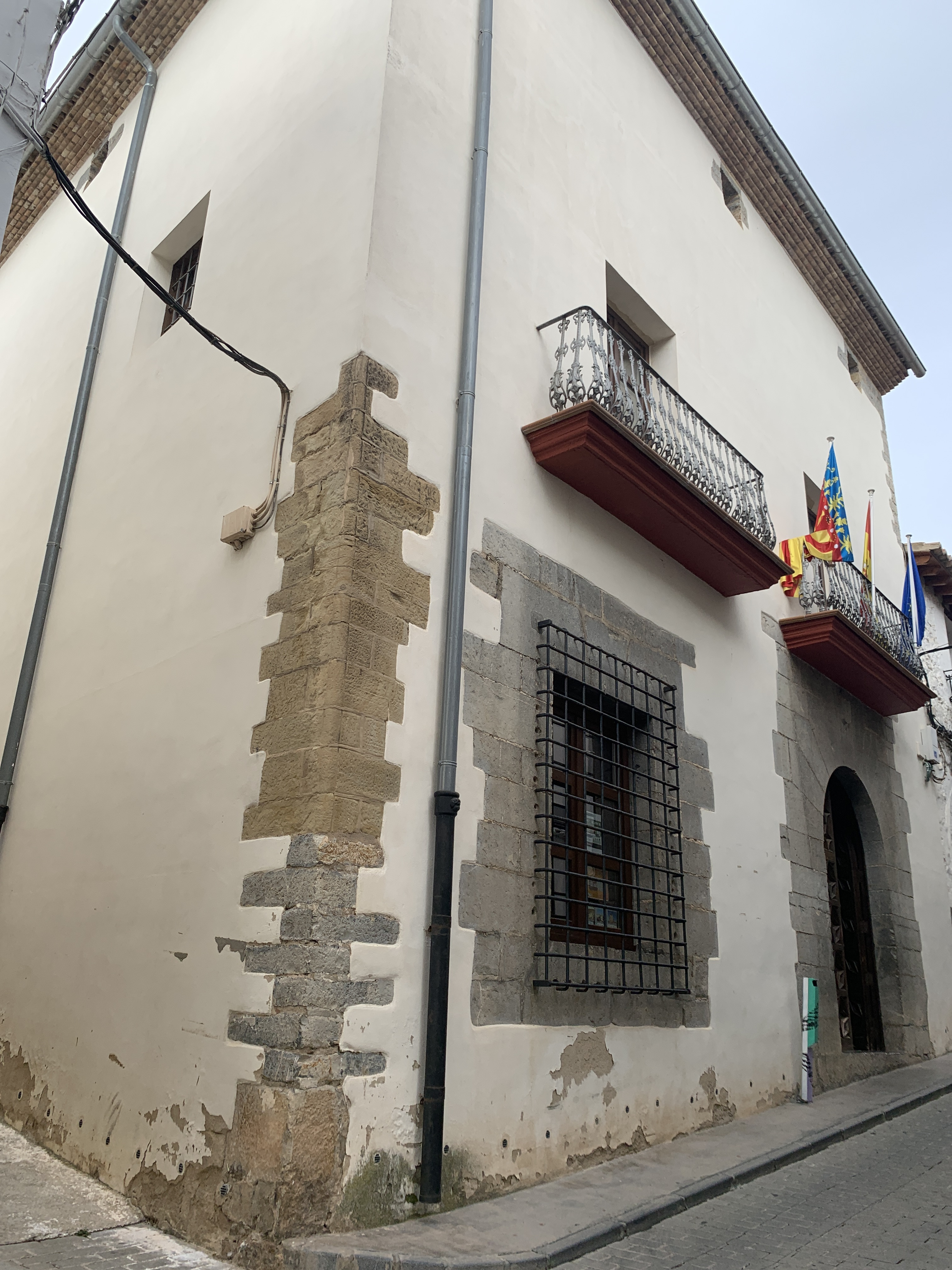
- Town hall

- Coat of arms

- Location in Spain
- Coordinates: 39°47′50″N 0°42′6″W
- Country: Spain
- Autonomous community: Valencian Community
- Province: Valencia
- Comarca: Los Serranos
- Judicial district: Llíria

Government
  - Alcalde: Manuel Civera Salvador

Area
  - Total: 43.5 km^{2} (16.8 sq mi)
- Elevation: 774 m (2,539 ft)

Population (2025-01-01)
  - Total: 710
  - Density: 16/km^{2} (42/sq mi)
- Demonym: Alcublano/a
- Time zone: UTC+1 (CET)
  - Summer (DST): UTC+2 (CEST)
- Postal code: 46172
- Official language(s): Spanish
- Website: Official website

Alcublas is a municipality in the comarca of Los Serranos in the Valencian Community, Spain.

== See also ==
- List of municipalities in Valencia
