= Sot de Chera =

- Municipality
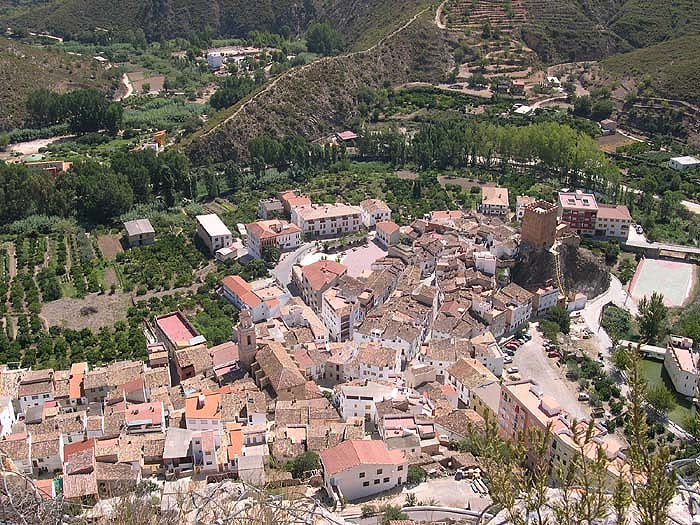

- Coat of arms

- Location in Spain
- Coordinates: 39°37′18″N 0°54′43″W
- Country: Spain
- Autonomous community: Valencian Community
- Province: Valencia
- Comarca: Los Serranos
- Judicial district: Llíria

Government
  - Alcalde: José Rafael Rodrigo Boronat

Area
  - Total: 38.8 km^{2} (15.0 sq mi)
- Elevation: 240 m (790 ft)

Population (2025-01-01)
  - Total: 427
  - Density: 11.0/km^{2} (28.5/sq mi)
- Demonym: Sotero/a
- Time zone: UTC+1 (CET)
  - Summer (DST): UTC+2 (CEST)
- Postal code: 46168
- Official language(s): Spanish
- Website: Official website

Sot de Chera is a municipality in the comarca of Los Serranos in the Valencian Community, Spain.

== See also ==
- List of municipalities in Valencia
