= Simón de Roxas Clemente y Rubio =

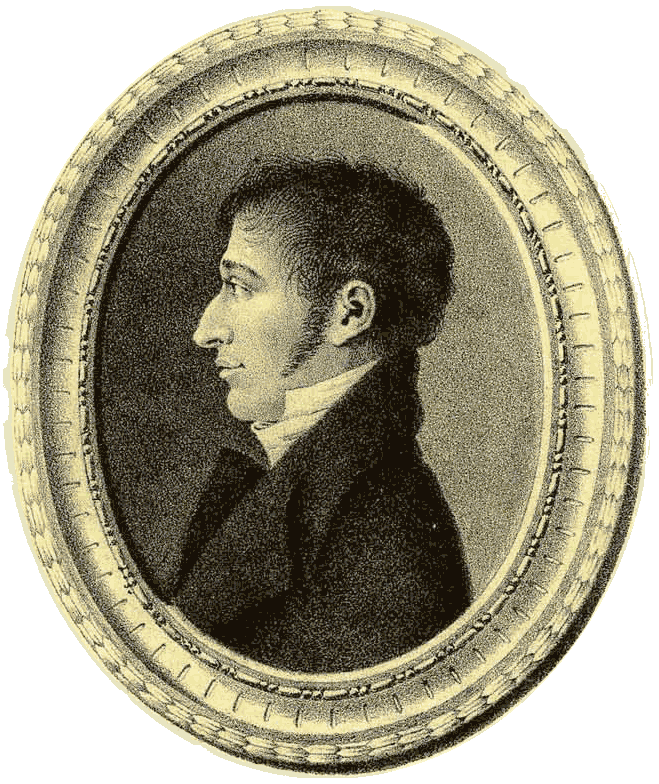
Portrait of Simón de Rojas Clemente y Rubio.

Simón de Roxas Cosme Damián Clemente y Rubio (27 September 1777, in Titaguas (Valencia, Spain) – 27 February 1827, in Madrid) was a Spanish botanist, considered to be the father of Spanish ampelography.

== Biography ==
=== Early Days ===
Born into a numerous family of 15 siblings (only six of which survived to adulthood) Simón de Rojas was a son of Joaquín Clemente Collado and his second wife, Juliana Rubio Polo, and was fourth in line in term of inheritance and thus only had a very slight possibility of inheriting the family notary business. At the age of 10 he entered the seminary of Segorbe, and after studying humanities for four years he was sent to Valencia to continue his secondary education. There he studied philosophy with Antonio Galiana and became an arts professor. He also studied other subjects in the ecclesiastical curriculum and he excelled in philology especially Greek, Hebrew and Latin. However, he was more attracted to the natural sciences and he put together several collections and classifications of plants and animals. At that time, Antonio José de Cavanilles Published Observaciones sobre el Reyno de Valencia (1795–97) which stimulated Rojas’ interest in botany.

=== Work Experience ===
In 1800, at the age of 23, he went to Madrid to apply for the professorship of Logic and Ethics at the Seminario de Nobles and even though he failed to win it he was awarded a post at the Colegio de San Isidro. He also enrolled there as a student where he took Arabic, Botany, Mineralology and Chemistry and he made contact with people he would collaborate later, for example Casimiro Gómez Ortega (Añover del Tajo, 1741 - Madrid, 1810), botanist and head of the Madrid Botanic Gardens; Mariano Lagasca y Segura (Encinacorba, 1776 - Barcelona, 1839), with whom he co-published Introducción a la Criptogamia Española in 1802.

In 1802, Rojas was nominated professor of Arabic in replacement of Miguel García who was ill. It was then that he met the famous Catalan traveller and spy Domingo Badía y Leblich, more commonly known as Alí Bey, a fellow enthusiast of the Arabic language and botany and the natural sciences. He managed to persuade Rojas to accompany him on a supposed scientific project in the north of Africa, but which in reality was a spying mission for Manuel Godoy.

He travelled through France and England with Badía and on these trips he collected and classified nine volumes of plant-lore, which he donated to the Botanic Gardens on his return to Madrid. Badía abandoned Rojas in the north of Africa, but Manuel Godoy paid for his silence with a stipend of 1,500 reales/month for the next four years and commissioned him to carry out a study of the natural history of the former Kingdom of Granada, independently of any academic or administrative authority.

For almost two years he travelled about the Granada, Jeréz de la Frontera and Sanlúcar areas collecting samples of wild and cultivated plants, observing agricultural practices, noting soil characteristics, micro-climates, and the adaptation of the flora to their natural environment. The results of this work were deposited, unedited, in the Botanic Gardens in Madrid. He also travelled to Seville in 1804. He published several articles in 1806 and 1807 in the Semanario de Agricultura y Artes, run by Francisco Antonio Zea, which would later form part of his book Variedades de la Vid Común que Vegetan en Andalucía, published in 1807.

This book was published as a result of his having met three prestigious agronomists: Esteban, Claudio Boutelou and Francisco Terán, head of the Botanic Gardens of Sanlúcar de Barrameda. They encouraged him to develop what was then a new discipline in Spain, that of ampelography or the study of vines. Rojas was to become the foremost European authority on this subject.

In 1807 he returned to Sanlúcar to run the Botanic Gardens, which he expanded by creating an experimental section with the aim of containing an example of every type of grape vine growing in Spain at the time, along the lines of what Chaptal had proposed in France when he was Minister of the Interior.

=== Napoleonic War ===
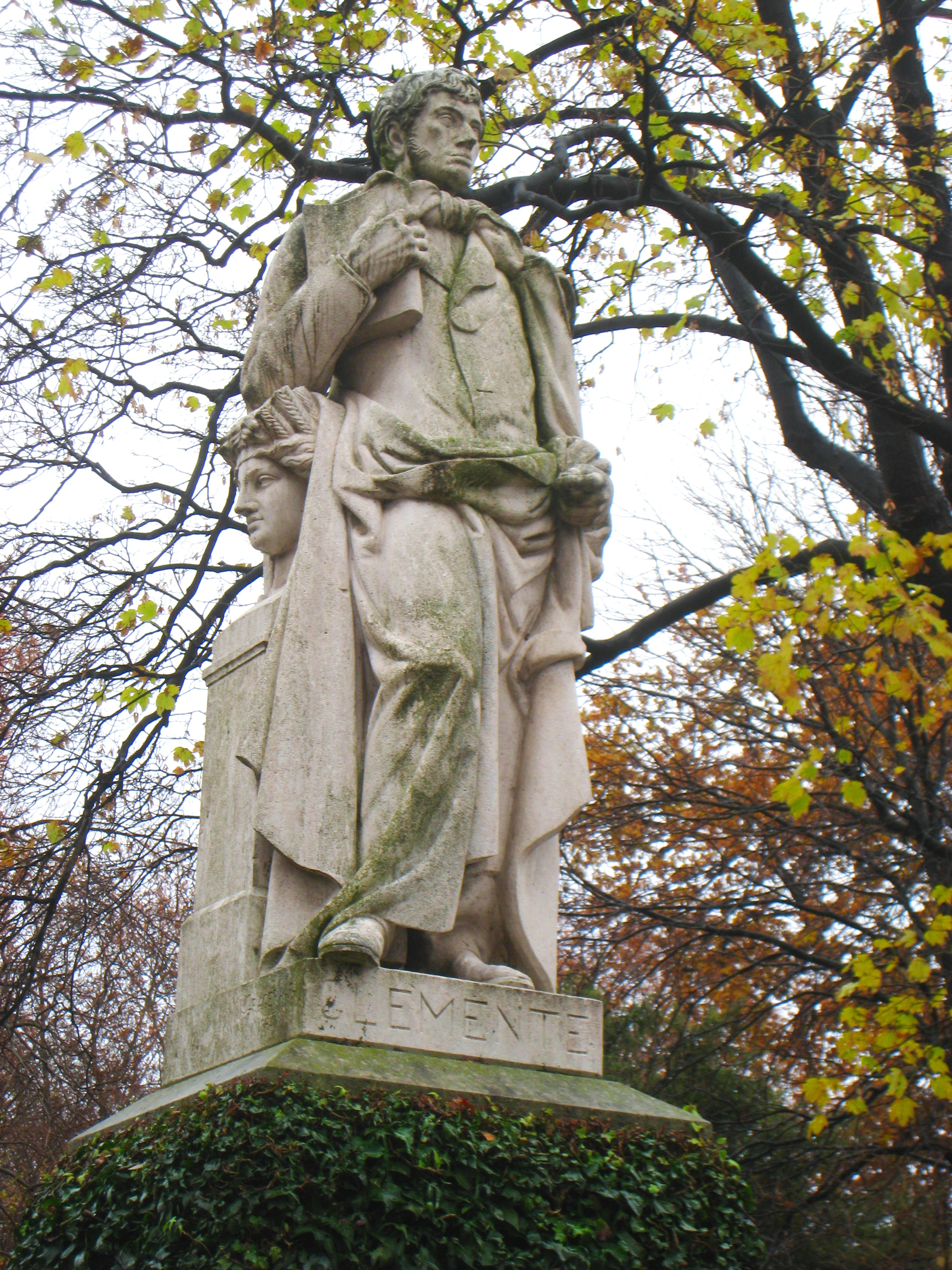
Statue of Simón de Rojas Clemente y Rubio in the Real Jardín Botánico de Madrid

The downfall of the Godoy government and the Napoleonic Wars interfered with these plans, however. Rojas tried to play both sides of the fence (pro-French and patriotic), as his liberal leanings made him favour the puppet government, but at the same time did not want to be considered a collaborator. He was able to travel freely all over Andalusia and to Madrid, but in 1812 he settled down in Titaguas. According to his first biographer, Miguel Colmeiro, he undertook many scientific and humanitarian projects: he wrote the civil, natural and ecclesiastical history of Titaguas, made topographical drawings of the municipality, researched the genealogy of the local surnames, taught children and adults to classify the different species of birds and plants and created an amateur theatrical company where he himself played a part in Molière’s El Médico a Palos and Calderón’s El alcalde de Zalamea.

After the war he was called on to work on the topographical drawings of the province of Cádiz but he preferred to take the post of Librarian at the Madrid Botanic Gardens, under his friend Mariano Lagasca. In 1817 they both catalogued the collections of South American plants shipped back to Madrid by José Celestino Mutis. He then edited Gabriel Alonso de Herrera’s Agricultura General in order to improve the original 1513 version with more rigorous scientific updates. He wrote a new prologue and added sections on species of wheat, cotton cultivation and most significantly on varieties and cultivation of grape vines and the main wines produced in Spain.

=== Later life ===
In 1820 when Riego reestablished the Cortes of Cádiz, Rojas supported him and was active in the liberal movement, and he was nominated to head the list of the deputies of the Valencia constituency. He accepted the post and formed part of the commissions on Health, Agriculture, and Public Health. However, he only participated once in the Parliament in order to propose the creation of an experimental agricultural farm in Sanlúcar de Barrameda.

With his health deteriorating, due to his having had yellow fever in the past, he asked for sick leave to recover, and he retired to Titaguas in 1821, where he spent the next five years of his life. There he continued to compile data for his Historia Natural de Titaguas and to complete his collections of plants, insects and animals. He also began to study bee-keeping and made notes in the margins of a copy of Gabriel Alonso de Herrera’s Agricultura General and in notebooks which ended up in the hands of the family of Antonio Sandalio de Arias. He returned to Madrid in 1826 to organise and finalise some of his many unfinished works, and he died there on 27 February 1827.

=== Legacy ===
Simón de Rojas Clemente is renowned for the initial planning and planning of the collection of grape vine varieties in the Plano de Flor.

== See also ==
- Category:Taxa named by Simón de Roxas Cosme Damián Clemente y Rubio

== Bibliography ==
- Juan Piqueras, "Gesta y vida de un insigne botánico. Reseña biográfica de Simón de Rojas Clemente", en Mètode, núm. 34 (2002).
- Miguel Colmeiro, La botánica y los botánicos de la Península Hispano-Lusitana: estudios bibliográficos y biográficos, Madrid: Imprenta y Estereotípa de M. Rivadeneyra, 1858.
- Fernando Martín Polo, Simón de Rojas Clemente, Valencia: PUV, 2016, 606 p.
