= Tuéjar =

- Municipality
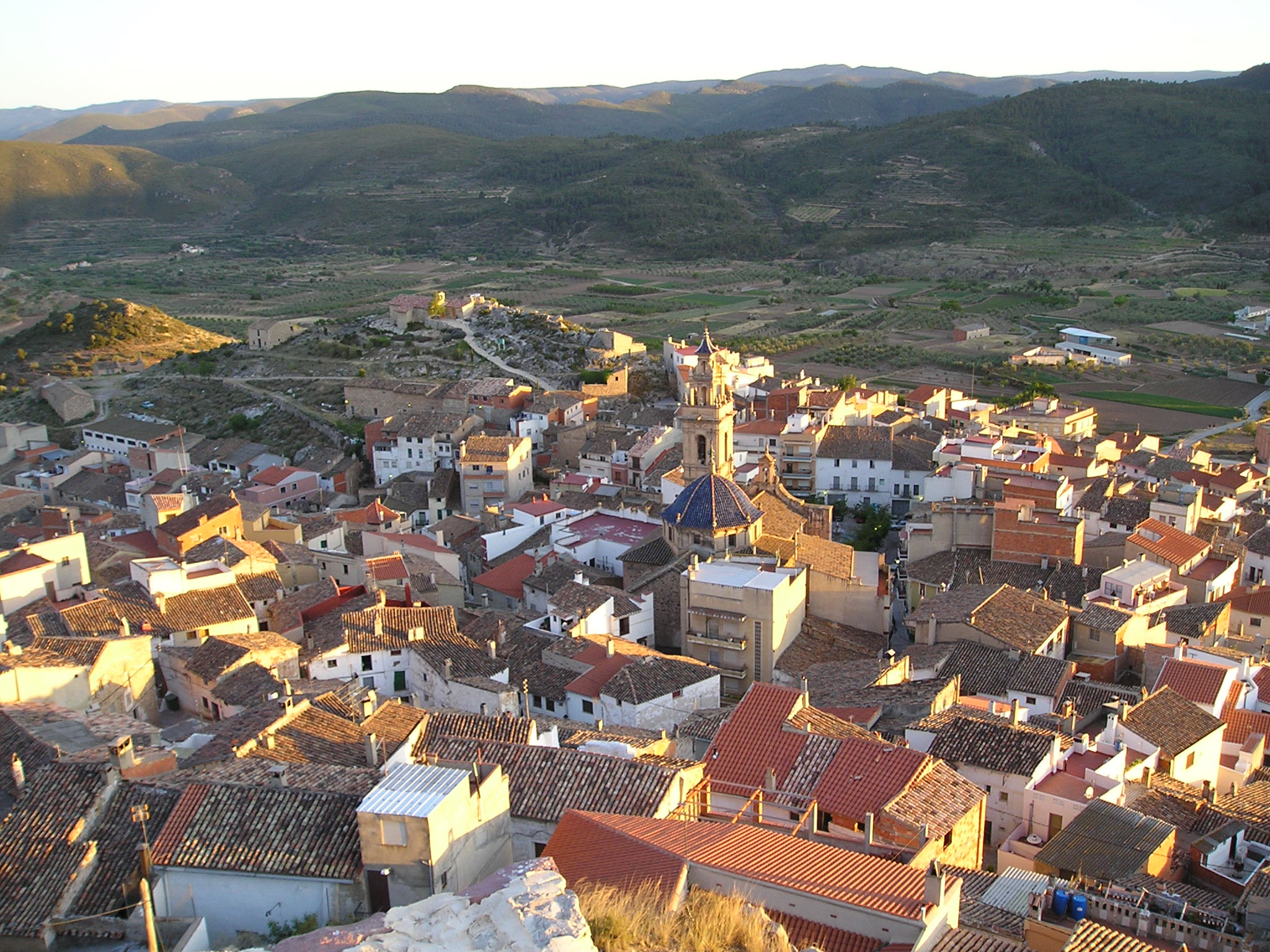

- Coat of arms

- Location in Spain
- Coordinates: 39°45′48.20″N 1°2′24.50″W
- Country: Spain
- Autonomous community: Valencian Community
- Province: Valencia
- Comarca: Los Serranos
- Judicial district: Llíria

Government
  - Alcalde: Francisco Oltra Martínez

Area
  - Total: 121.90 km^{2} (47.07 sq mi)
- Elevation: 610 m (2,000 ft)

Population (2025-01-01)
  - Total: 1,278
  - Density: 10.48/km^{2} (27.15/sq mi)
- Time zone: UTC+1 (CET)
  - Summer (DST): UTC+2 (CEST)
- Postal code: 46177
- Official language(s): Spanish
- Website: Official website

Tuéjar is a municipality in the comarca of Los Serranos in the Valencian Community, Spain.

== See also ==
- List of municipalities in Valencia
