= Chulilla =

- Municipality
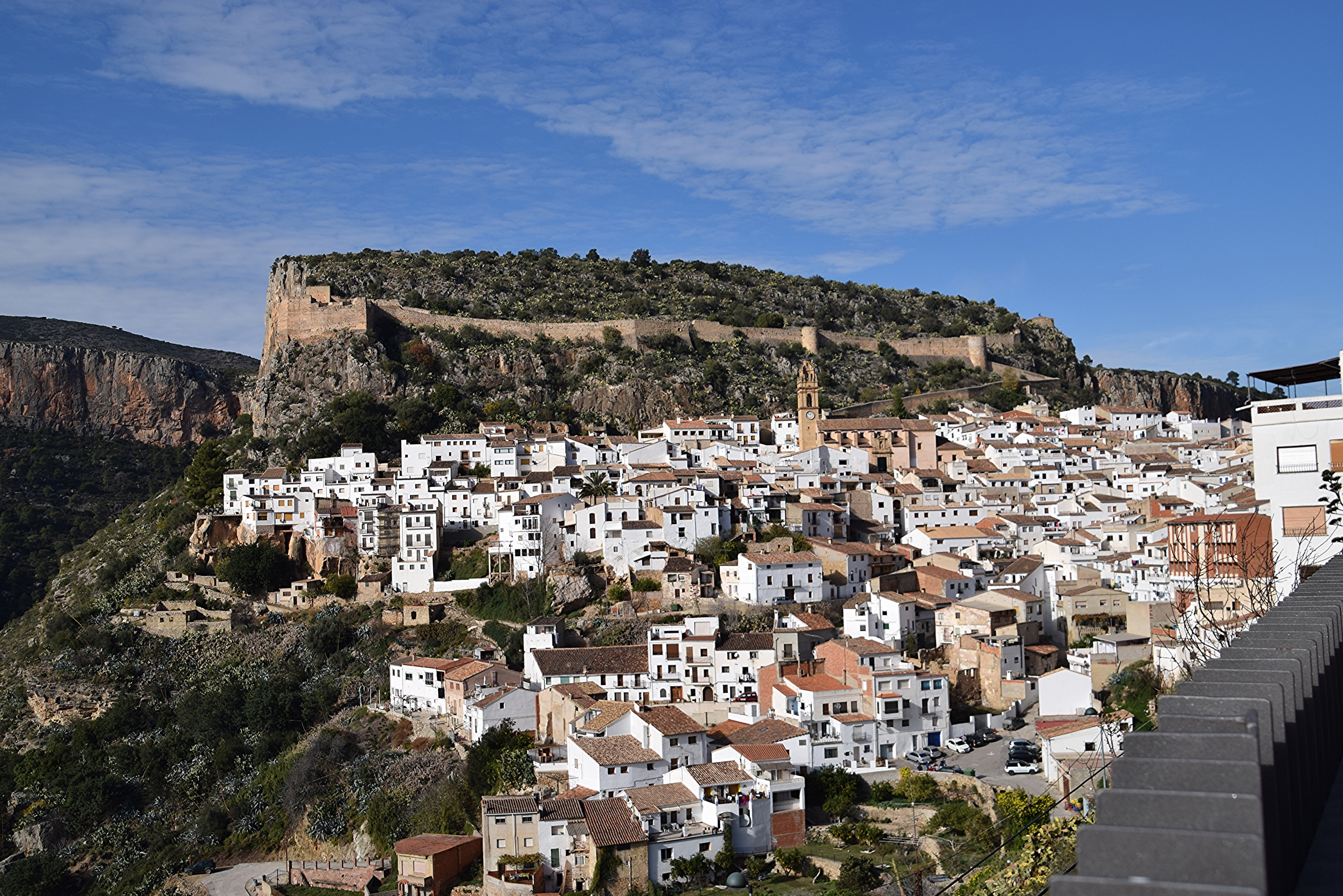

- Flag Coat of arms

- Location in Spain
- Coordinates: 39°39′20″N 0°53′44″W
- Country: Spain
- Autonomous community: Valencian Community
- Province: Valencia
- Comarca: Los Serranos
- Judicial district: Llíria

Government
  - Alcalde: Enrique Silvestre (PP)

Area
  - Total: 61.8 km^{2} (23.9 sq mi)
- Elevation: 400 m (1,300 ft)

Population (2025-01-01)
  - Total: 710
  - Density: 11/km^{2} (30/sq mi)
- Demonym(s): Chulillano, chulillana
- Time zone: UTC+1 (CET)
  - Summer (DST): UTC+2 (CEST)
- Postal code: 46167
- Official language(s): Spanish
- Website: Official website

Chulilla is a municipality in the comarca of Los Serranos in the Valencian Community, Spain. The name in Valencian is Xulilla, but the local language is Spanish, not Valencian.

== See also ==
- List of municipalities in Valencia
