= Calles =

- Municipality
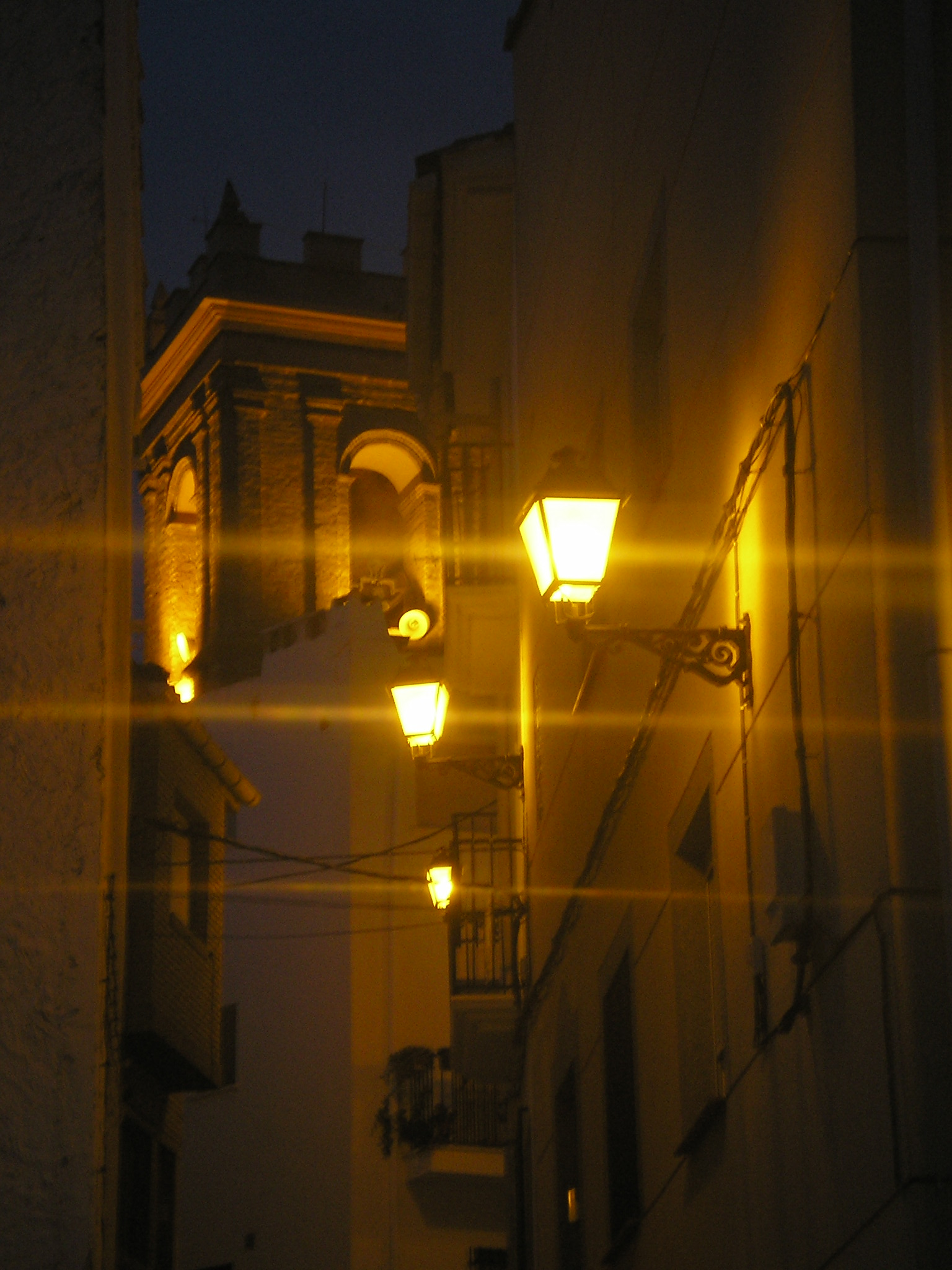

- Coat of arms

- Location in Spain
- Coordinates: 39°43′28″N 0°58′22″W
- Country: Spain
- Autonomous community: Valencian Community
- Province: Valencia
- Comarca: Los Serranos
- Judicial district: Llíria

Government
  - Alcalde: Angel Valero Solaz

Area
  - Total: 64.5 km^{2} (24.9 sq mi)
- Elevation: 351 m (1,152 ft)

Population (2025-01-01)
  - Total: 465
  - Density: 7.21/km^{2} (18.7/sq mi)
- Demonym: Callejano/a
- Time zone: UTC+1 (CET)
  - Summer (DST): UTC+2 (CEST)
- Postal code: 46175
- Official language(s): Spanish
- Website: Official website

Calles is a municipality in the comarca of Los Serranos in the Valencian Community, Spain.

== See also ==
- Sierra de Utiel
- List of municipalities in Valencia
