= Chelva =

- Municipality
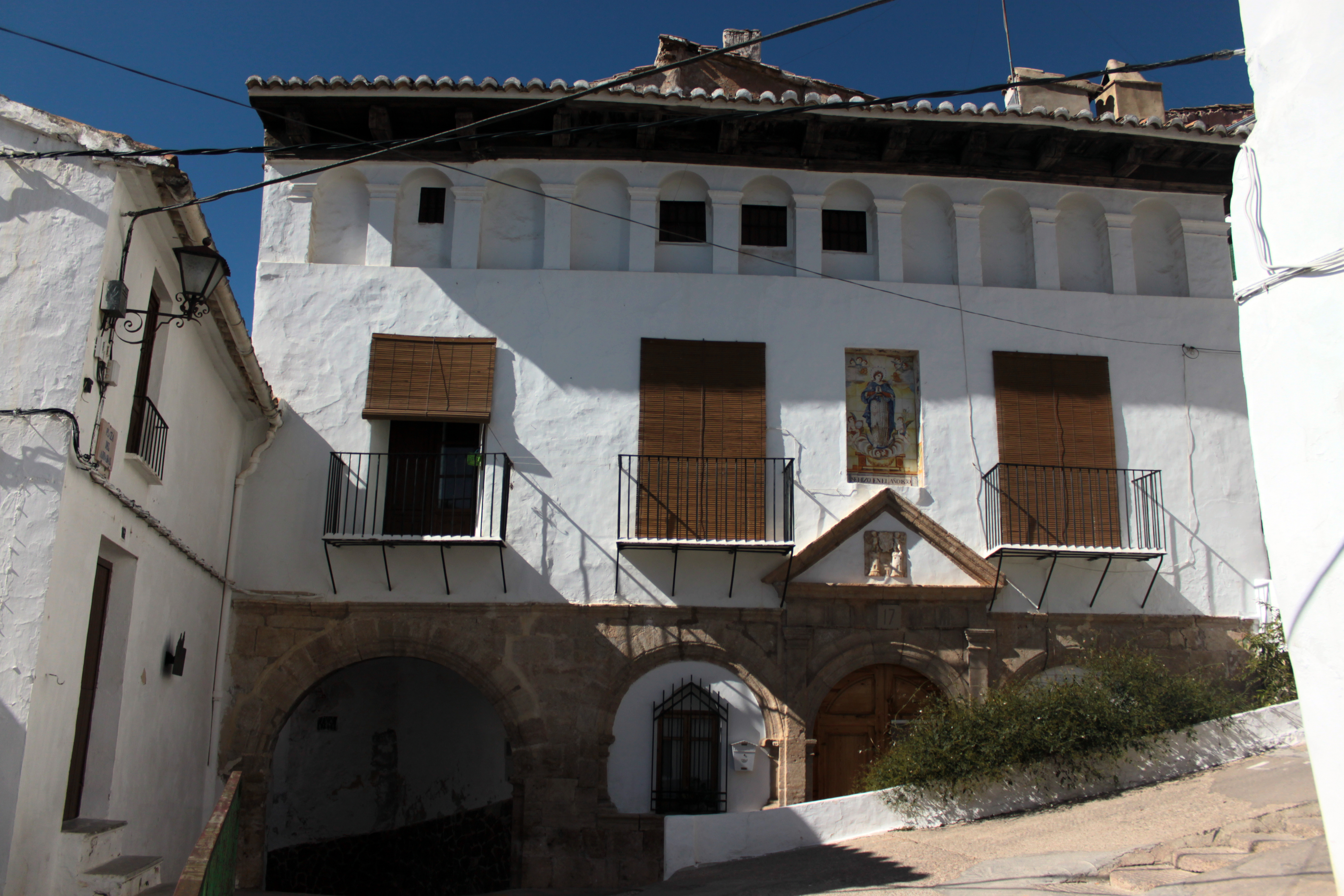
- Town hall

- Coat of arms

- Location in Spain Chelva (Valencian Community) Chelva (Spain)
- Coordinates: 39°44′49″N 0°59′51″W
- Country: Spain
- Autonomous community: Valencian Community
- Province: Valencia
- Comarca: Los Serranos
- Judicial district: Llíria

Government
  - Alcalde: David Cañigueral Belmonte

Area
  - Total: 190.6 km^{2} (73.6 sq mi)
- Elevation: 800 m (2,600 ft)

Population (2025-01-01)
  - Total: 1,863
  - Density: 9.774/km^{2} (25.32/sq mi)
- Demonym(s): Chelvano, chelvana
- Time zone: UTC+1 (CET)
  - Summer (DST): UTC+2 (CEST)
- Postal code: 46176
- Official language(s): Spanish
- Website: Official website

Chelva is a municipality in the comarca of Los Serranos in the Valencian Community, Spain. Its name in Valencian is Xelva, but the local language is Spanish and not Valencian.

== Geography ==
Chelva has an area of about 192 km^{2}. The town is located in the middle of the mountains, and about 52% of its area is covered by typical Mediterranean woodlands. Two rivers flow through the municipality: one with the same name of the village (Chelva), and the other the Turia River, which flows to the Mediterranean via Valencia. The rivers do not meet in Chelva, but rather in adjacent Domeño.

The municipality is also home to several notable summits: the Cerro de la Nevera (1,259 metres or 4,131 feet), La Atalaya (1,157 metres or 3,796 feet), and the Pico del Remedio (1,054 metres or 3,458 feet). There are also several natural springs; the most well known are: Berra, Gitana, Gorgol, Sabina, and Cortina.

Chelva has a semiarid Mediterranean climate, with some rain in autumn and spring. In winter, it is cold, and in parts of the mountains snow is common.

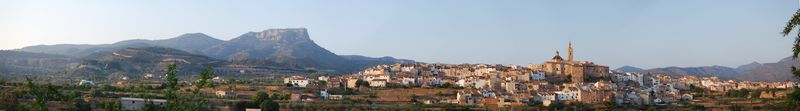
Panorama of Chelva

== Demography ==
Since 1794—when its population was 7,200 inhabitants—the census has registered a gradual decline in population, to a total of fewer than 2000 inhabitants today. The population is distributed in the main city of Chelva as well as a few nearby villages: Villar de Tejas, Ahíllas, Alcotas, Mas de Caballero, Mas de Sancho, and El Cerrito.

=== Demographic evolution ===
1842	1857	1860	1877	1887	1897	1900	1910	1920	1930	1940	1950	1960	1970	1981	1991	2001	2004	2005	2006
4488	4499	4999	5202	4947	4911	5402	5457	5652	4647	4652	4130	3608	3078	2234	2065	2046	1986	1938	1877

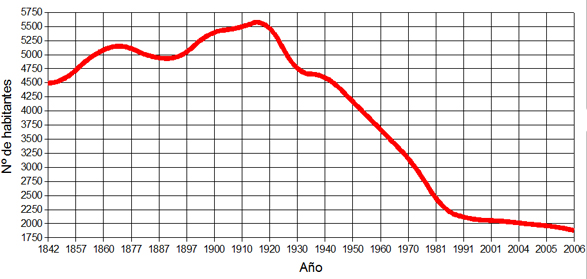

== History ==
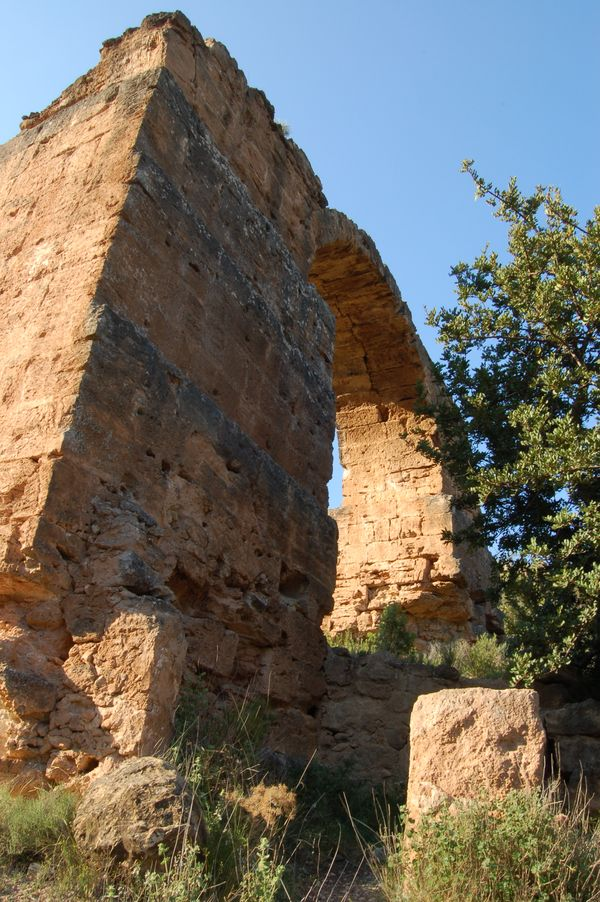
The Peña Cortada aqueduct

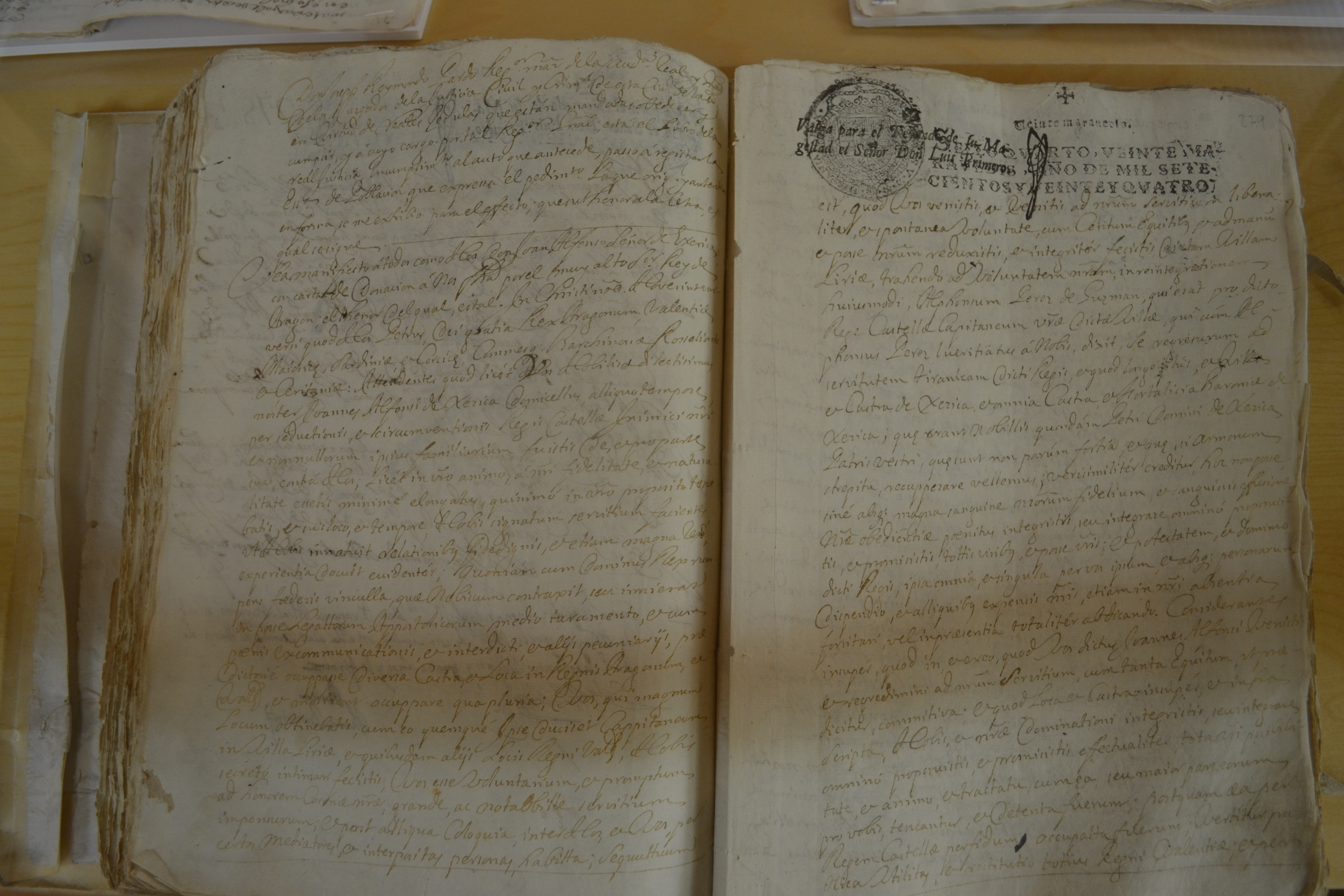
Municipal charter of Chelva (1369).

The oldest archeological finds in Chelva are some paintings from the Neolithic era. From the Bronze Age we find a site in Nieva del Medio. Chelva was home to the ancient Iberians, evidenced by the remains of two villages in Torrecilla and Castillejo de Alcotas. Many examples of pottery, decorated with geometrical designs, have been found there, and some walls can still be seen.

The most important remains to be found in Chelva's limits are from the Roman epoch. From then we find the aqueduct called Peña Cortada, which stretches along Tuejar, Chelva, Calles, and Domeño, but with an unknown destination.

The origins of the present town can be found in the 11th century, when the ruling Moors established a fortress. The original city center was developed adjacent to the castle, and bore the name "Benacacira." It was enclosed by a wall with four gates (one is still visible, San Cristobal). Because of these fortifications, Chelva was a town of considerable importance during the Muslim rule.

Permanent Moorish control of the town ended in 1194, when the city was conquered by Peter II of Aragon. In 1214 the Muslims briefly retook Chelva, but by 1238 Christian troops took permanent control of the town.

The city was repopulated with Christians in 1390 and King John I bestowed upon Pedro Ladron de Vilanova the title of Viscount of Cheva. In later years, this title belonged to the Frigolas family, and finally, to Duke Villahermosa.

During the Revolt of the Brotherhoods in the 16th century, the town was occupied by revolting agermanados troops.

In 1839 during the Carlist War, the city was fortified and converted in a hospital by General Cabrera.

== Local festivals ==
San Antón: 17 January. On the closest weekend to this date people in Chelva make big fires to get the higher amount of "jewels" (live chickens). During this weekend the town also hosts an international oral storytelling festival: Cuentantón.

Holy Week. During the Holy week, apart from regular religious celebrations, Chelva celebrates a special tradition: The first Sunday of Easter, after the procession of the Encuentro, thousands of "aleluyas" are thrown from the top of the church. These little pieces of paper are blessed and have religious inscriptions. People fight to get them because, according to tradition, they bring luck to those who manage to put them behind doors and windows forming a cross.

May fiesta: 30 April. Typical manifestation of traditional folklore. Accompanied by a group of musicians, people go around the city singing "Mayos". These are funny lines that, formerly, boys used to sing to girls in order to seduce them.

Youth week: July. During the week there are many activities, but the most important is the paella competition. On Friday night the townsfolk gather at the Plaza Mayor and compete to make the best paella. After the competition, a band stays in the square, performing the rest of the evening.

Our Lady of Remedio: August. A whole week full of activities, processions, and different bands playing every night. The festival also includes sports competitions like indoor football, marathon, chess, and fishing. There are also fireworks.

== See also ==
- List of municipalities in Valencia
