= Higueruelas =

- Municipality
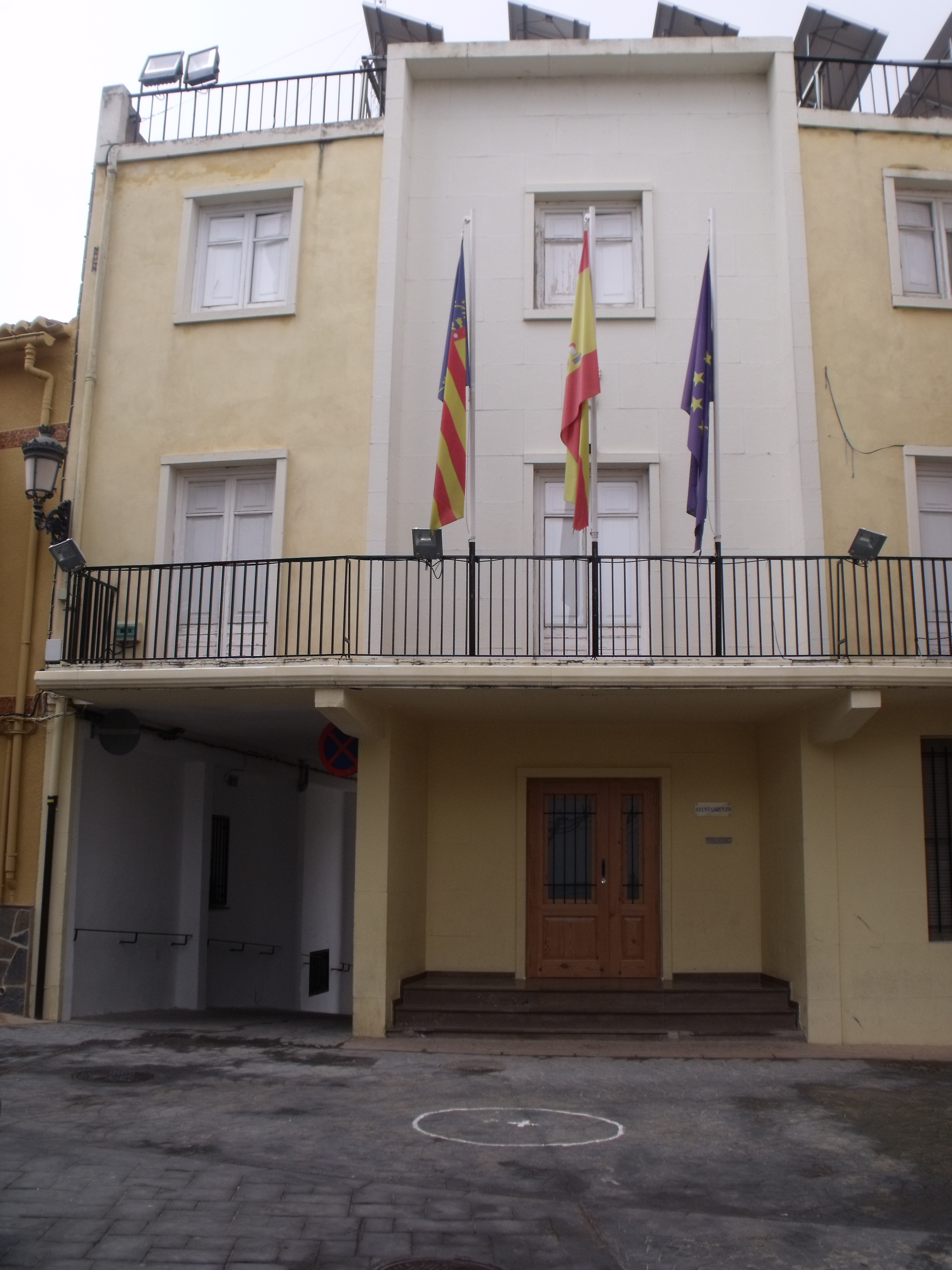
- Town hall

- Coat of arms

- Location in Spain
- Coordinates: 39°47′22″N 0°51′38″W
- Country: Spain
- Autonomous community: Valencian Community
- Province: Valencia
- Comarca: Los Serranos
- Judicial district: Llíria

Government
  - Alcalde: Juan José Solaz Cortés

Area
  - Total: 18.8 km^{2} (7.3 sq mi)
- Elevation: 725 m (2,379 ft)

Population (2025-01-01)
  - Total: 567
  - Density: 30.2/km^{2} (78.1/sq mi)
- Demonym: Higueruelano/a
- Time zone: UTC+1 (CET)
  - Summer (DST): UTC+2 (CEST)
- Postal code: 46170
- Official language(s): Spanish
- Website: Official website

Higueruelas is a municipality in the comarca of Los Serranos in the Valencian Community, Spain. The name in Valencian is Figueroles de Domenyo, but the local language is Spanish, not Valencian.

== See also ==
- List of municipalities in Valencia
