= Villar del Arzobispo =

Municipality in Valencia, Spain

Villar del Arzobispo El Villar
- Municipality
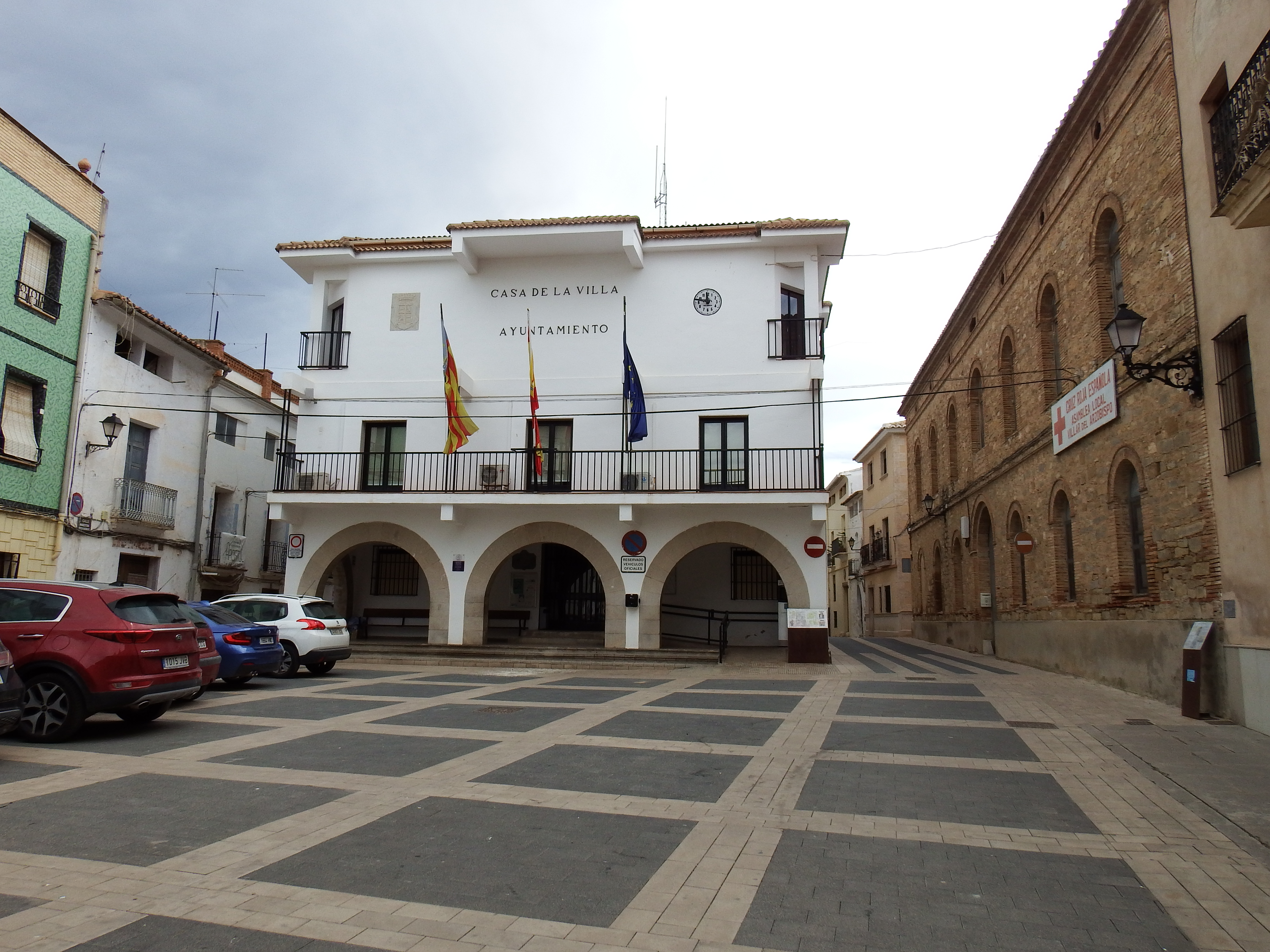
- Town hall

- Coat of arms

- Location in Spain
- Coordinates: 39°43′50″N 0°49′32″W
- Country: Spain
- Autonomous community: Valencian Community
- Province: Valencia
- Comarca: Los Serranos
- Judicial district: Llíria

Government
  - Alcalde: Eduardo Gómez Martínez (2009) (PSOE)

Area
  - Total: 40.7 km^{2} (15.7 sq mi)
- Elevation: 520 m (1,710 ft)

Population (2025-01-01)
  - Total: 3,862
  - Density: 94.9/km^{2} (246/sq mi)
- Demonym: Villarenco/a
- Time zone: UTC+1 (CET)
  - Summer (DST): UTC+2 (CEST)
- Postal code: 46170
- Official language(s): Spanish
- Website: Official website

Villar del Arzobispo (Valencian: El Villar) is a municipality in the comarca of Los Serranos in the Valencian Community, Spain.

== See also ==
- List of municipalities in Valencia
