= Losa del Obispo =

- Municipality
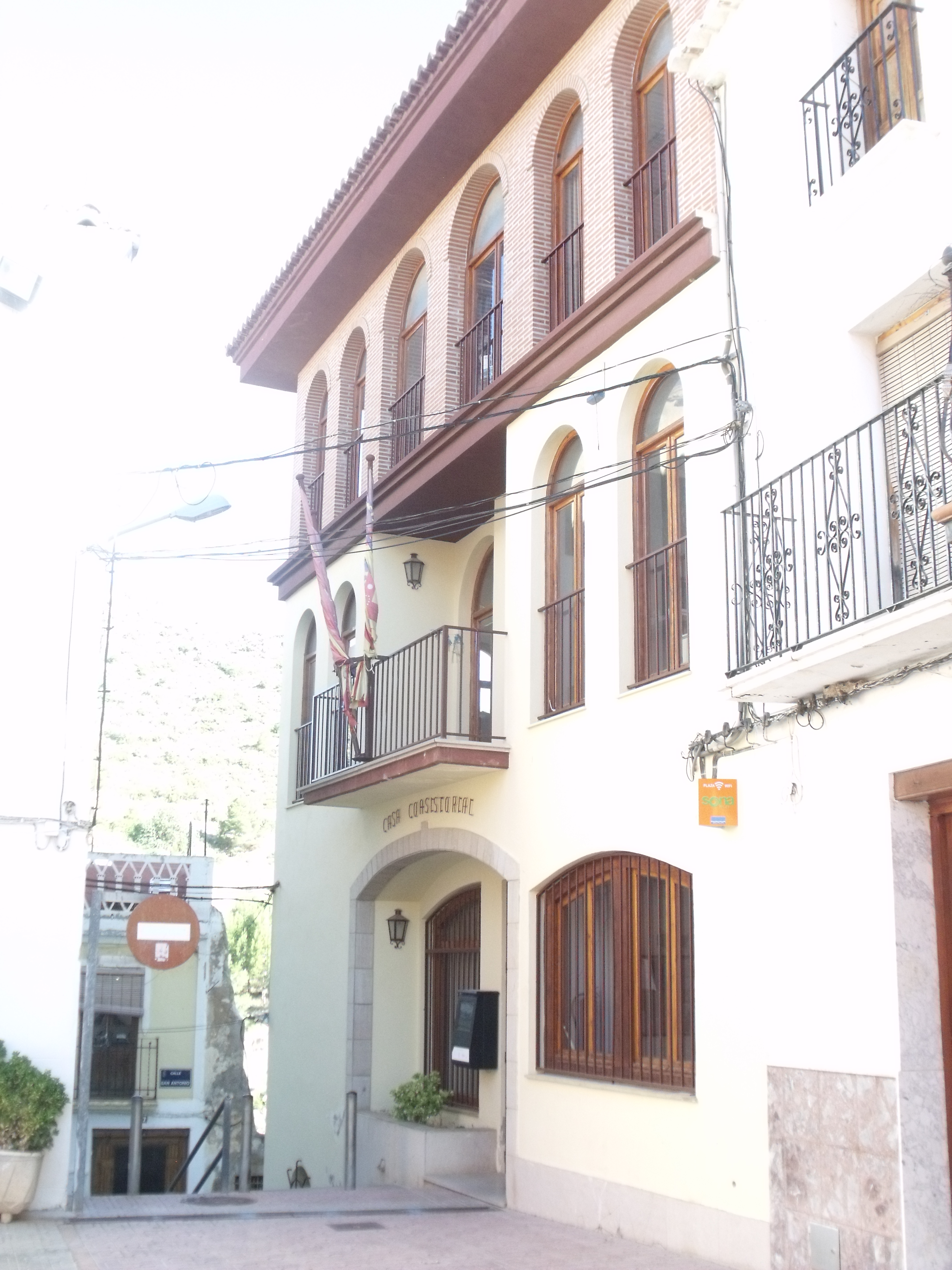
- Town hall

- Coat of arms

- Location in Spain
- Coordinates: 39°41′42″N 0°52′21″W
- Country: Spain
- Autonomous community: Valencian Community
- Province: Valencia
- Comarca: Los Serranos
- Judicial district: Llíria

Government
  - Alcalde: Benjamín M. Aparicio Cervera

Area
  - Total: 12.2 km^{2} (4.7 sq mi)
- Elevation: 350 m (1,150 ft)

Population (2025-01-01)
  - Total: 531
  - Density: 43.5/km^{2} (113/sq mi)
- Demonym: Losano/a
- Time zone: UTC+1 (CET)
  - Summer (DST): UTC+2 (CEST)
- Postal code: 46168
- Official language(s): Spanish
- Website: Official website

Losa del Obispo is a municipality in the comarca of Los Serranos in the Valencian Community, Spain. The name in Valencian is La Llosa del Bisbe, but the local language is Spanish, not Valencian.

== See also ==
- List of municipalities in Valencia
