= Bugarra =

- Municipality
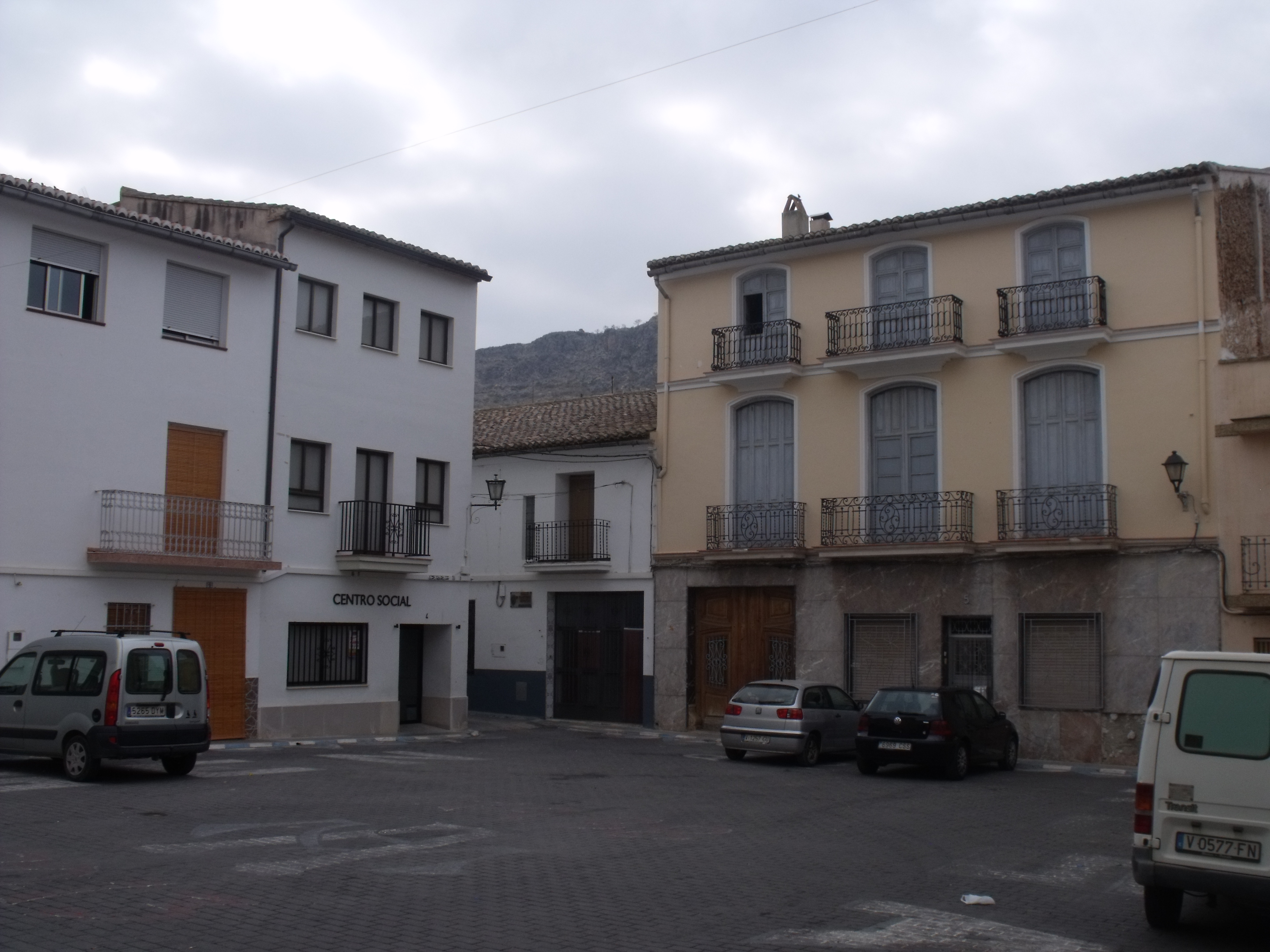

- Flag Coat of arms

- Location in Spain
- Coordinates: 39°36′35″N 0°46′24″W
- Country: Spain
- Autonomous community: Valencian Community
- Province: Valencia
- Comarca: Los Serranos
- Judicial district: Llíria

Government
  - Alcalde: Juan Manuel García Calduch (2003)

Area
  - Total: 40.3 km^{2} (15.6 sq mi)
- Elevation: 165 m (541 ft)

Population (2025-01-01)
  - Total: 774
  - Density: 19.2/km^{2} (49.7/sq mi)
- Demonym: Bugarreño/a
- Time zone: UTC+1 (CET)
  - Summer (DST): UTC+2 (CEST)
- Postal code: 46165
- Official language(s): Spanish
- Website: Official website

Bugarra is a municipality in the comarca of Los Serranos in the Valencian Community, Spain.

== See also ==
- List of municipalities in Valencia
