= Serranos (comarca) =

Coordinates: 39.6876°N 0.915983°W

Serranos Serrans
- Comarca
- Country: Spain
- Autonomous community: Valencian Community
- Province: València / Valencia
- Capital: Chelva
- Municipalities: 19 municipalities: Alcublas, Alpuente, Andilla, Aras de los Olmos, Benagéber, Bugarra, Calles, Chelva, Chulilla, Domeño, Gestalgar, Higueruelas, Losa del Obispo, Pedralba, Sot de Chera, Titaguas, Tuéjar, Villar del Arzobispo, La Yesa

Area
  - Total: 1,405.28 km^{2} (542.58 sq mi)

Population (2006)
  - Total: 17,497
  - Density: 12.451/km^{2} (32.248/sq mi)
- Time zone: UTC+1 (CET)
  - Summer (DST): UTC+2 (CEST)
- Most populated municipality: Villar del Arzobispo

Serranos (Spanish: [seˈranos]; Valencian: Serrans [seˈrans]), also known as Serranía (Spanish: [seraˈni.a]; Valencian: Serrania [seraˈni.a]), is a comarca administrative subdivision in the province of Valencia, Valencian Community, Spain. It is part of the Spanish-speaking area in the Valencian Community.

Geographically and historically Chera (Xera) was part of this comarca. Nowadays, according to the current administrative division pattern of the Valencian Community, Chera is officially part of the Requena-Utiel comarca.

== Municipalities ==
Municipalities of Serranos

- Alcublas
- Alpuente
- Andilla
- Aras de los Olmos
- Benagéber
- Bugarra
- Calles
- Chelva
- Chulilla
- Domeño
- Gestalgar
- Higueruelas
- Losa del Obispo
- Pedralba
- Sot de Chera
- Titaguas
- Tuéjar
- Villar del Arzobispo
- La Yesa

== See also ==
- Requena-Utiel
