= Domeño =

- Municipality
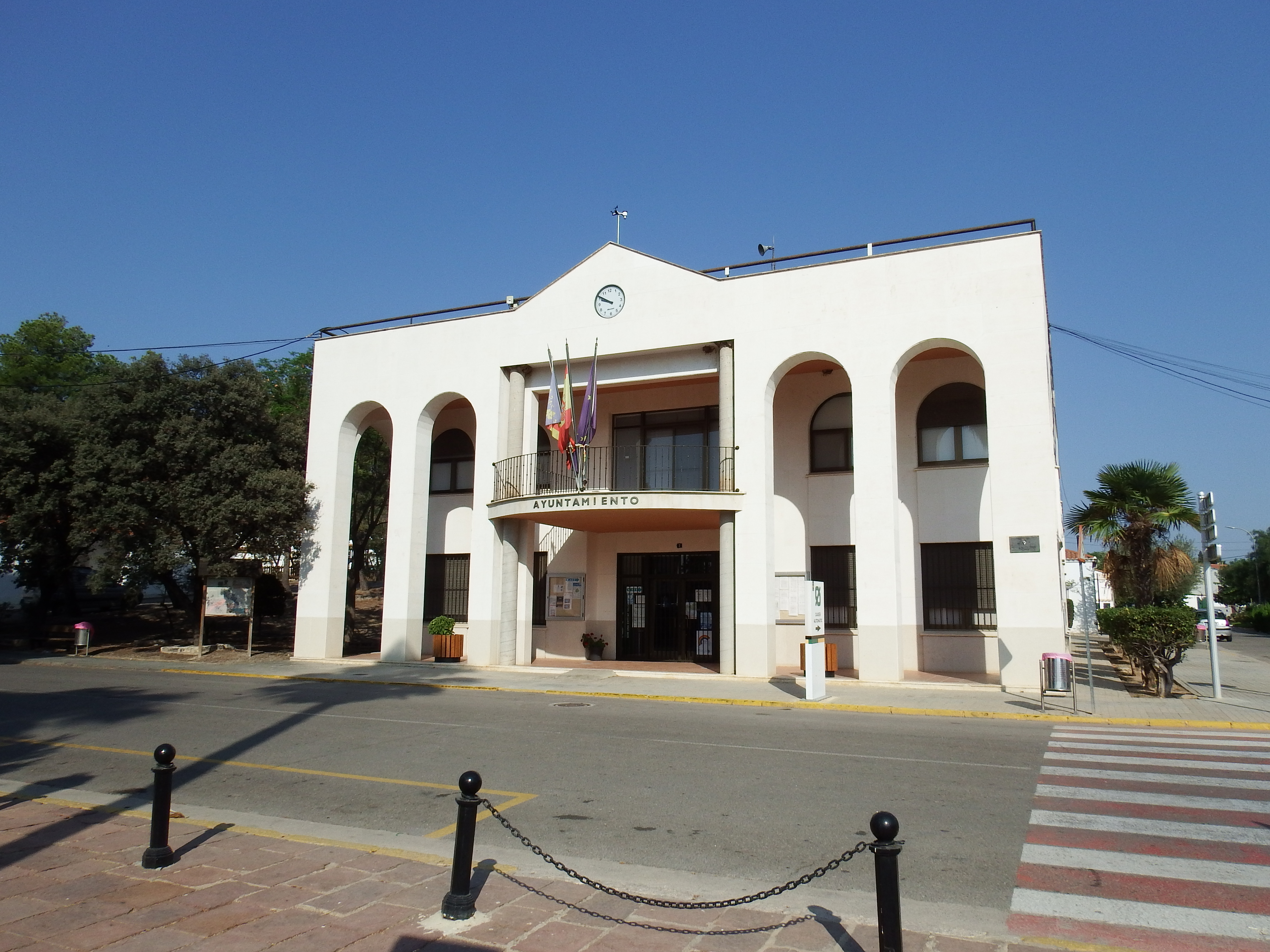
- Town hall

- Coat of arms

- Location in Spain
- Coordinates: 39°42′43″N 0°56′34″W
- Country: Spain
- Autonomous community: Valencian Community
- Province: Valencia
- Comarca: Los Serranos
- Judicial district: Llíria

Government
  - Alcalde: Vicente Madrid Martínez (2007) (PSOE)

Area
  - Total: 68.8 km^{2} (26.6 sq mi)
- Elevation: 250 m (820 ft)

Population (2025-01-01)
  - Total: 723
  - Density: 10.5/km^{2} (27.2/sq mi)
- Demonym: Domeñero/a
- Time zone: UTC+1 (CET)
  - Summer (DST): UTC+2 (CEST)
- Postal code: 46175
- Official language(s): Spanish
- Website: Official website

Domeño is a municipality in the comarca of Los Serranos in the Valencian Community, Spain. The name in Valencian is Domenyo, but the local language is Spanish, not Valencian.

== See also ==
- Sierra de Utiel
- List of municipalities in Valencia
