= Gestalgar =

- Municipality
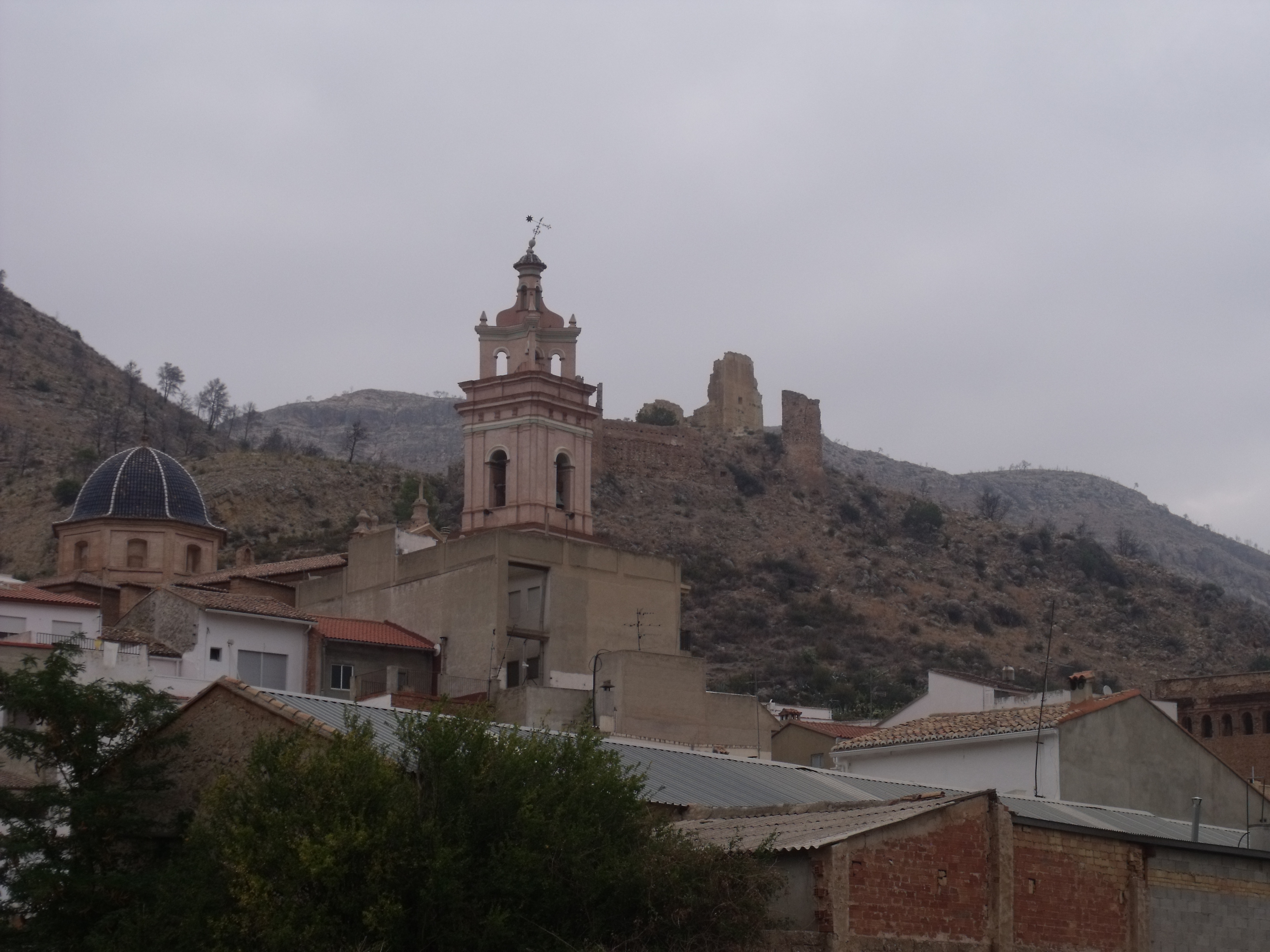

- Coat of arms

- Location in Spain
- Coordinates: 39°36′18″N 0°50′4″W
- Country: Spain
- Autonomous community: Valencian Community
- Province: Valencia
- Comarca: Los Serranos
- Judicial district: Llíria

Government
  - Alcalde: Rafael Pardos Peiró

Area
  - Total: 69.7 km^{2} (26.9 sq mi)
- Elevation: 200 m (660 ft)

Population (2025-01-01)
  - Total: 587
  - Density: 8.42/km^{2} (21.8/sq mi)
- Demonym: Gestalguino/a
- Time zone: UTC+1 (CET)
  - Summer (DST): UTC+2 (CEST)
- Postal code: 46166
- Official language(s): Spanish
- Website: Official website

Gestalgar (Valencian: Xestalgar) is a municipality of the comarca of Los Serranos in the Valencian Community, Spain. The predominant local language in the municipality is Spanish, not Valencian.

== See also ==
- List of municipalities in Valencia
