= Andilla =

- Municipality
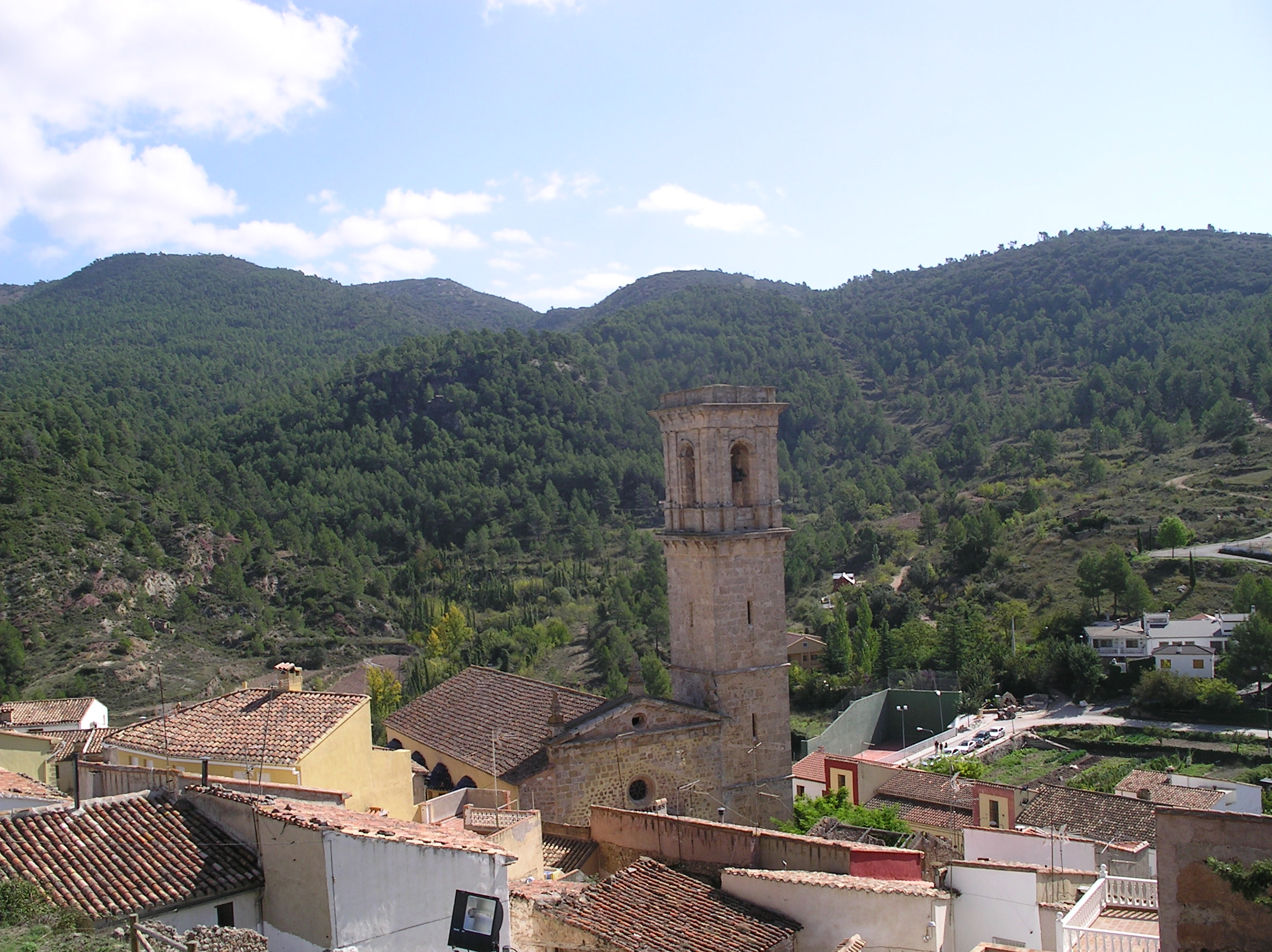

- Coat of arms

- Location in Spain
- Coordinates: 39°50′10″N 0°48′54″W
- Country: Spain
- Autonomous community: Valencian Community
- Province: Valencia
- Comarca: Los Serranos
- Judicial district: Llíria

Government
  - Mayor: Celestino M. Perales Gálvez

Area
  - Total: 142.8 km^{2} (55.1 sq mi)
- Elevation: 895 m (2,936 ft)

Population (2025-01-01)
  - Total: 338
  - Density: 2.37/km^{2} (6.13/sq mi)
- Demonym: Andillanos
- Time zone: UTC+1 (CET)
  - Summer (DST): UTC+2 (CEST)
- Postal code: 46170
- Official language(s): Spanish
- Website: Official website

Andilla is a municipality in the comarca of Los Serranos in the Valencian Community, Spain.

== See also ==
- List of municipalities in Valencia
