= Alpuente =

- Municipality
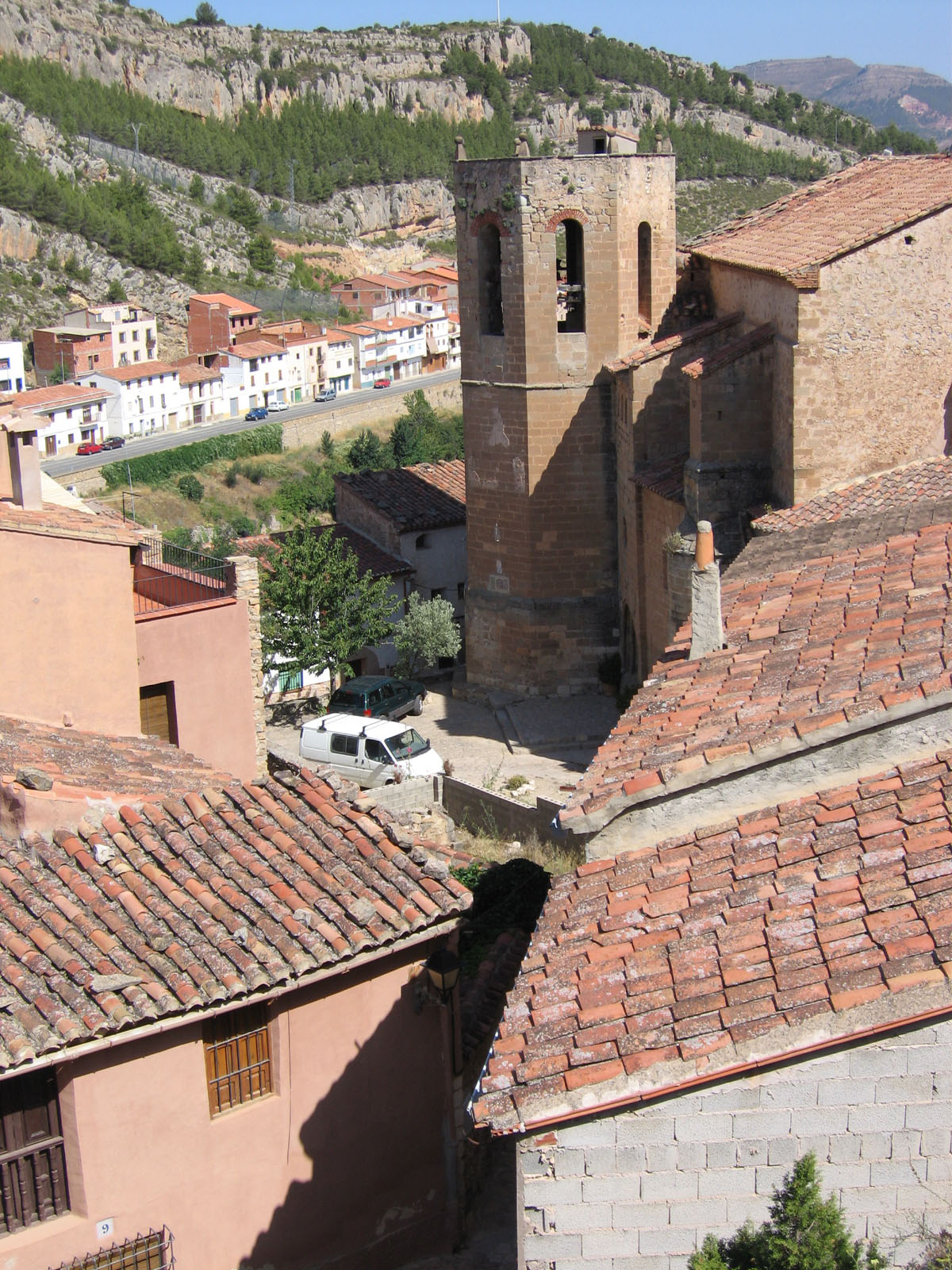

- Coat of arms

- Location in Spain
- Coordinates: 39°52′40″N 1°0′50″W
- Country: Spain
- Autonomous community: Valencian Community
- Province: Valencia
- Comarca: Los Serranos
- Judicial district: Llíria

Government
  - Alcalde: Amparo Rodríguez Sambonet

Area
  - Total: 138.3 km^{2} (53.4 sq mi)
- Elevation: 1,000 m (3,300 ft)

Population (2025-01-01)
  - Total: 688
  - Density: 4.97/km^{2} (12.9/sq mi)
- Demonym: Alpontino/a
- Time zone: UTC+1 (CET)
  - Summer (DST): UTC+2 (CEST)
- Postal code: 46178
- Official language(s): Spanish
- Website: Official website

Alpuente is a town and municipality in the province of Valencia, part of Valencia, Spain.

== History ==
It was the capital of an Iberia Muslim taifa or kingdom in the 11th century, ruled by the dynasty of Beni Kasim. Its name at that time was Arabic: البُنْت, romanized: al-Būnt, which might derive from Altum Pontem, Latin for 'high bridge'.

In 1103, Alpuente fell under the Almoravid dynasty. In 1145, it became part of the emirate of Valencia and was occupied, along with the rest of the emirate, by the Almohads in 1172, then passing as Almohad rule in Iberia collapsed to the emirate of Murcia in 1229. Alpuente was conquered by the king of Aragon in 1229. After the province was created Alpuente became a very common name throughout all of Spain, but mainly in Valencia.

== Demographics ==
Historical Population
1990	1992	1994	1996	1998	2000	2002	2004	2005	2007	2008	2010	2011	2012	2013
1,208	1,174	1,134	985	958	941	916	861	864	828	805	781	698	675	631

== See also ==
- List of municipalities in Valencia
