= Titaguas =

- Municipality
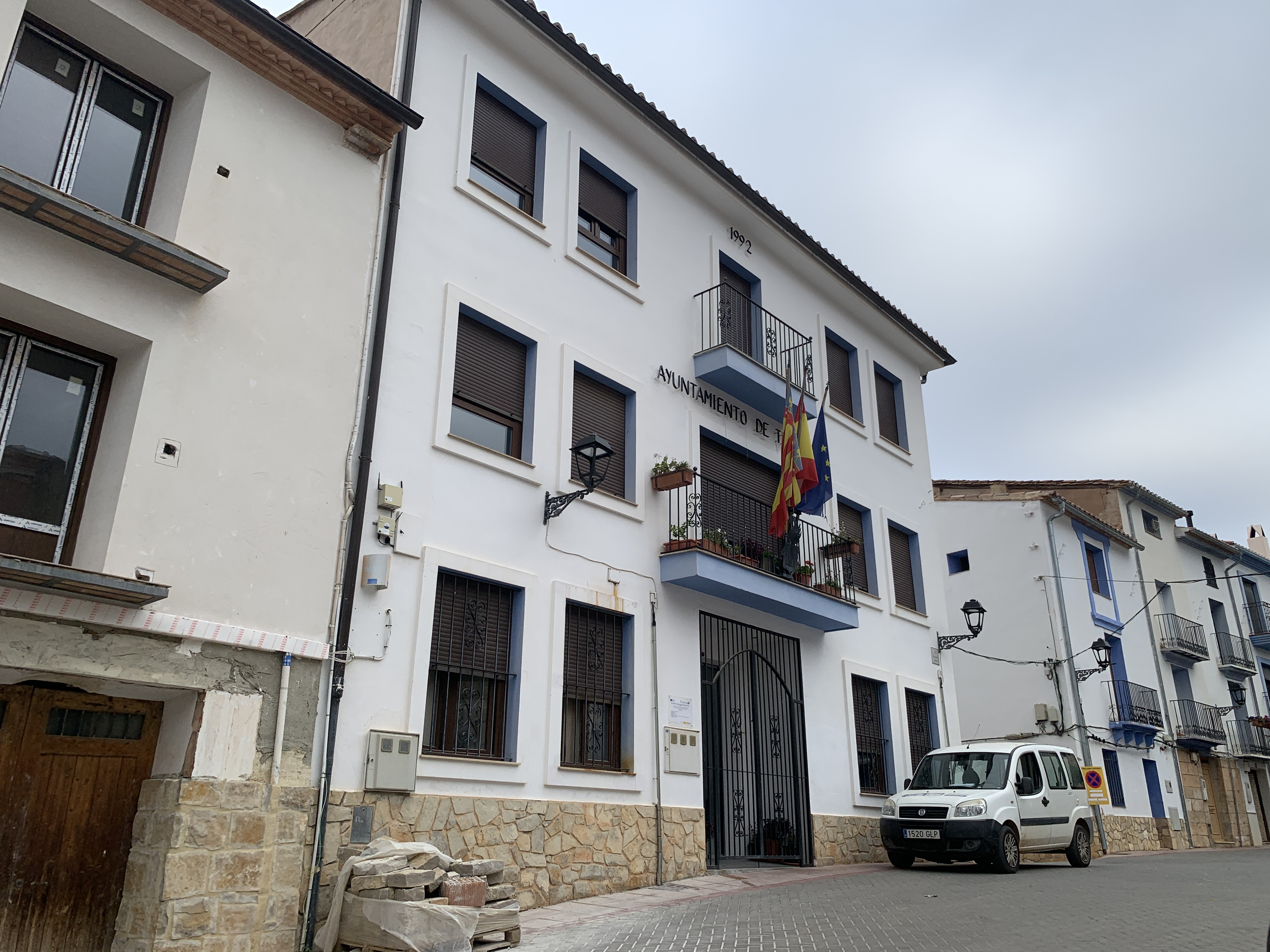
- Town hall

- Coat of arms

- Location in Spain
- Coordinates: 39°52′3″N 1°4′51″W
- Country: Spain
- Autonomous community: Valencian Community
- Province: Valencia
- Comarca: Los Serranos
- Judicial district: Llíria

Government
  - Alcalde: Ramiro Rivera Gracia

Area
  - Total: 63.21 km^{2} (24.41 sq mi)
- Elevation: 720 m (2,360 ft)

Population (2025-01-01)
  - Total: 517
  - Density: 8.18/km^{2} (21.2/sq mi)
- Demonym: Titagüeño/a o Titagüense/a
- Time zone: UTC+1 (CET)
  - Summer (DST): UTC+2 (CEST)
- Postal code: 46178
- Official language(s): Spanish
- Website: Official website

Titaguas is a village and municipality in the comarca of Los Serranos in the Valencian Community, Spain.

== See also ==
- List of municipalities in Valencia
