= List of municipalities in Albacete =

Administrative divisions in Albacete, Spain

Map of Spain with the province of Albacete highlighted

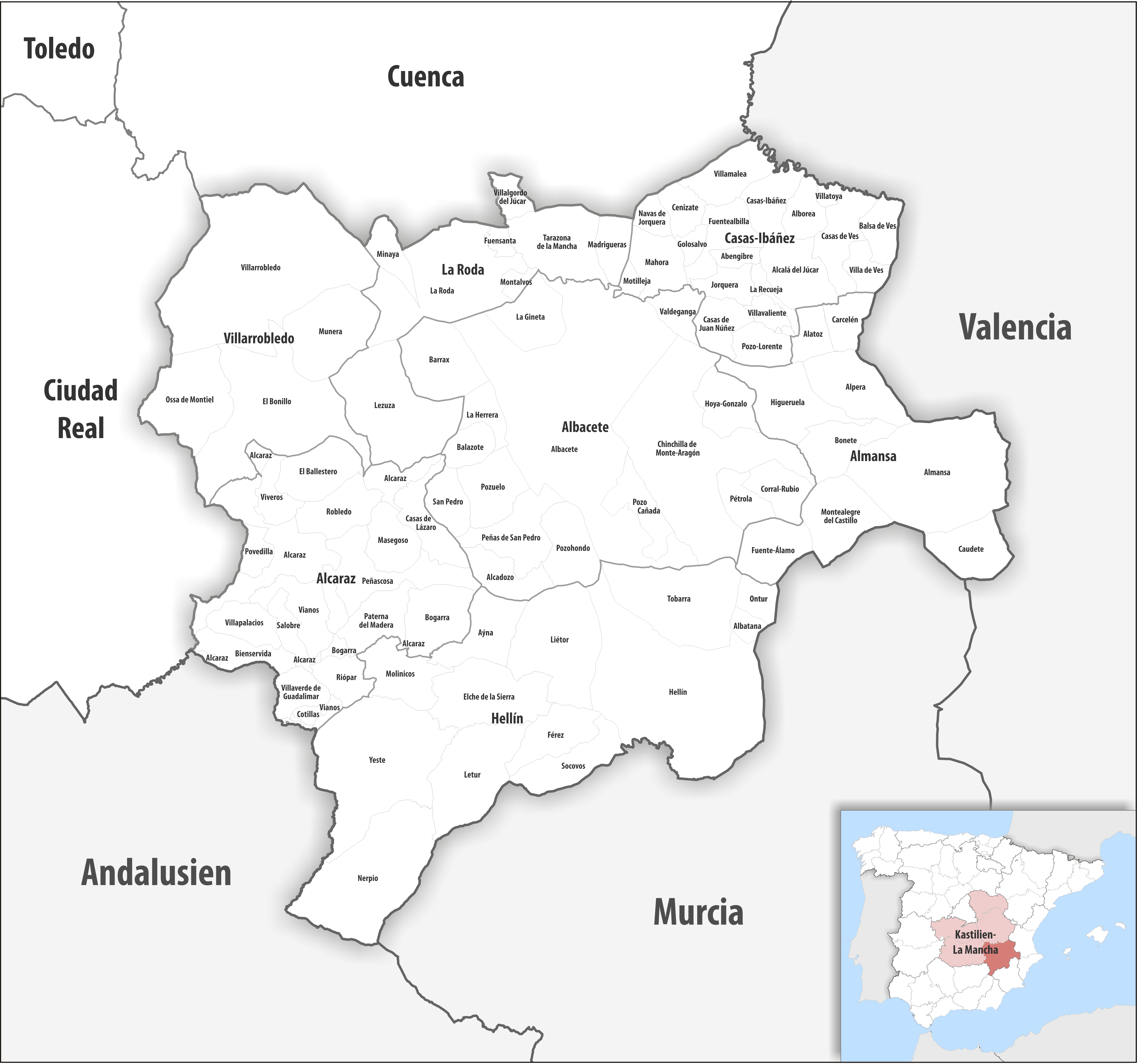
Map of the municipalities in the province of Albacete

Albacete is a province in the autonomous community of Castilla–La Mancha, Spain. The province is divided into 87 municipalities. As of the 2023 Spanish census, Albacete is the 35th most populous of Spain's 50 provinces, with 387,529 inhabitants, and the 9th largest by land area, spanning 14,922.19 km^{2} (5,761.49 sq mi). Municipalities are the most basic local political division in Spain and can only belong to one province. They enjoy a large degree of autonomy in their local administration, being in charge of tasks such as urban planning, water supply, lighting, roads, local police, and firefighting.

The organisation of municipalities in Spain is outlined by the local government law Ley 7/1985, de 2 de abril, Reguladora de las Bases del Régimen Local (transl. Law 7/1985, of 2 April, Regulating the Bases of the Local Administration), which was passed by the Cortes Generales—Spain’s national parliament—on 2 April 1985 and finalised by royal decree on 18 April 1986. Municipalities in Albacete are also governed by the Statute of Autonomy of Castilla-La Mancha, which includes provisions concerning their relations with Castilla–La Mancha's autonomous government. All citizens of Spain are required to register in the municipality in which they reside. Each municipality is a corporation (Note: Within the context of local government in Spain, a corporation is a legal entity representing a municipality. Each municipality is empowered to govern over a specific piece of land and its population.) with independent legal personhood: its governing body is called the ayuntamiento (municipal council or corporation), a term often also used to refer to the municipal offices (city and town halls). The ayuntamiento is composed of the mayor (Spanish: alcalde), the deputy mayors (tenientes de alcalde) and the councillors (concejales), who form the plenary (pleno), the deliberative body. Municipalities are categorised by population for determining the number of councillors: three when the population is up to 100 inhabitants, five for 101–250, seven for 251–1,000, nine for 1,001–2,000, eleven for 2,001–5,000, thirteen for 5,001–10,000, seventeen for 10,001–20,000, twenty-one for 20,001–50,000, and twenty-five for 50,001–100,000. One councillor is added for every additional 100,000 inhabitants, with a further one included if the total would otherwise be even, to avoid tied votes.

The mayor and the deputy mayors are elected by the plenary assembly, which is itself elected by universal suffrage. Elections in municipalities with more than 250 inhabitants are carried out following a proportional representation system with closed lists, whilst those with a population lower than 250 use a block plurality voting system with open lists. The plenary assembly must meet periodically, with meetings occurring more or less frequently depending on the population of the municipality: monthly for those whose population is larger than 20,000, once every two months if it ranges between 5,001 and 20,000, and once every three months if it does not exceed 5,000. Many ayuntamientos also have a local governing board (Spanish: junta de gobierno local), which is appointed by the mayor from amongst the councillors and is required for municipalities of over 5,000 inhabitants. The board, whose role is to assist the mayor between meetings of the plenary assembly, may not include more than one third of the councillors.

The largest municipality by population in the province as of the 2023 Spanish census is Albacete, its capital, with 173,202 residents, while the smallest is Villa de Ves, with 61 residents. The largest municipality by area is also Albacete, which spans 1,126.98 square kilometres (435.13 sq mi), while Cotillas is the smallest at 14.46 square kilometres (5.58 sq mi).

== Municipalities ==
Largest municipalities in the province of Albacete by population

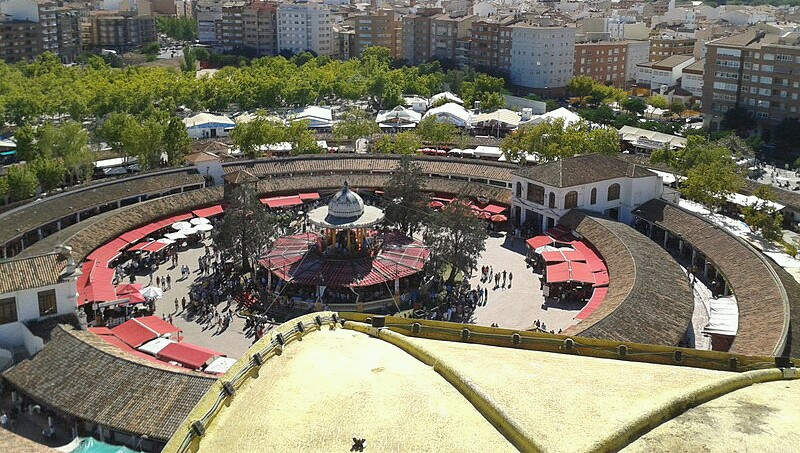
Albacete is the province's capital and largest municipality by population.

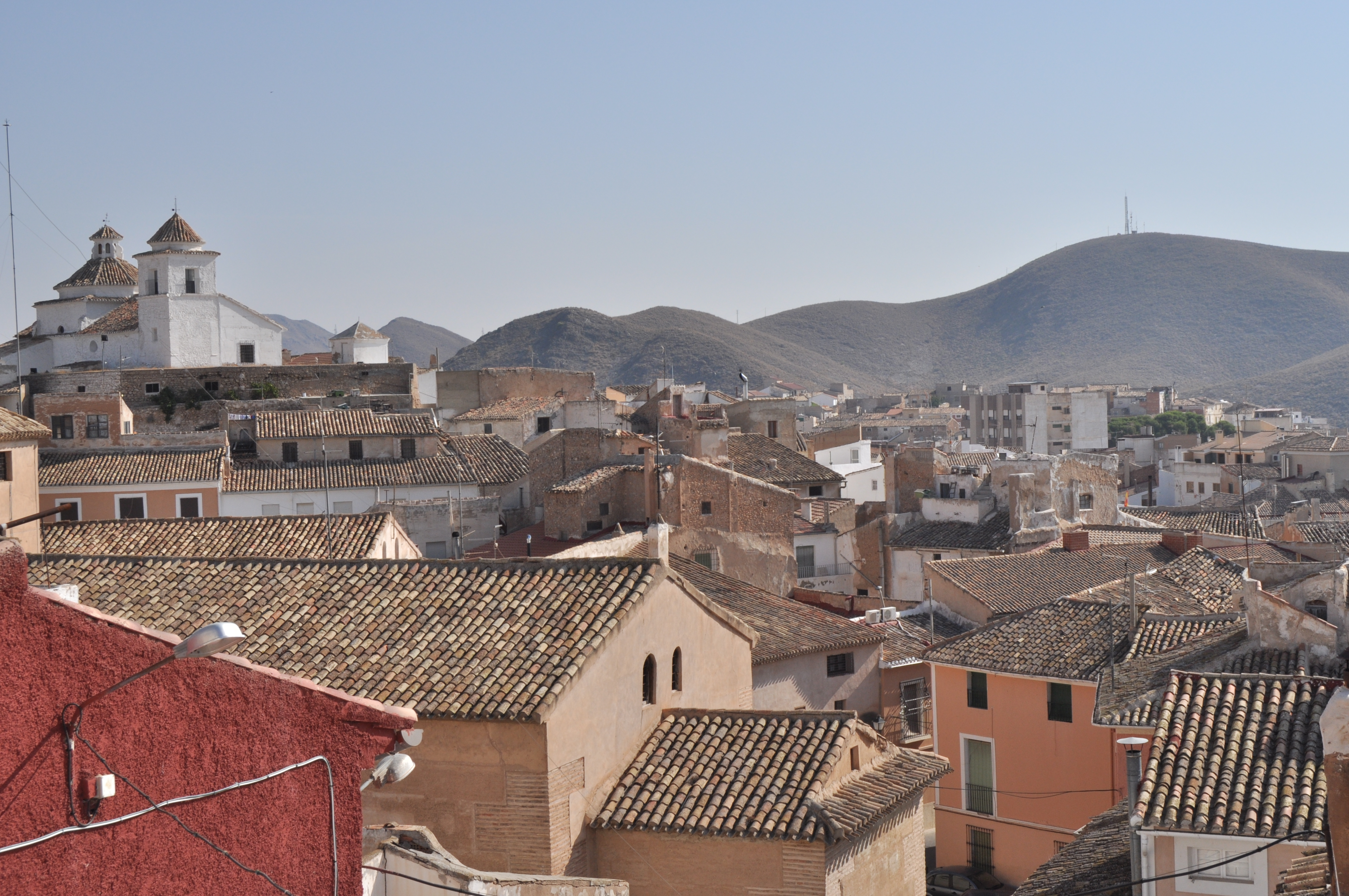
Hellín, the second largest municipality by population in the province of Albacete

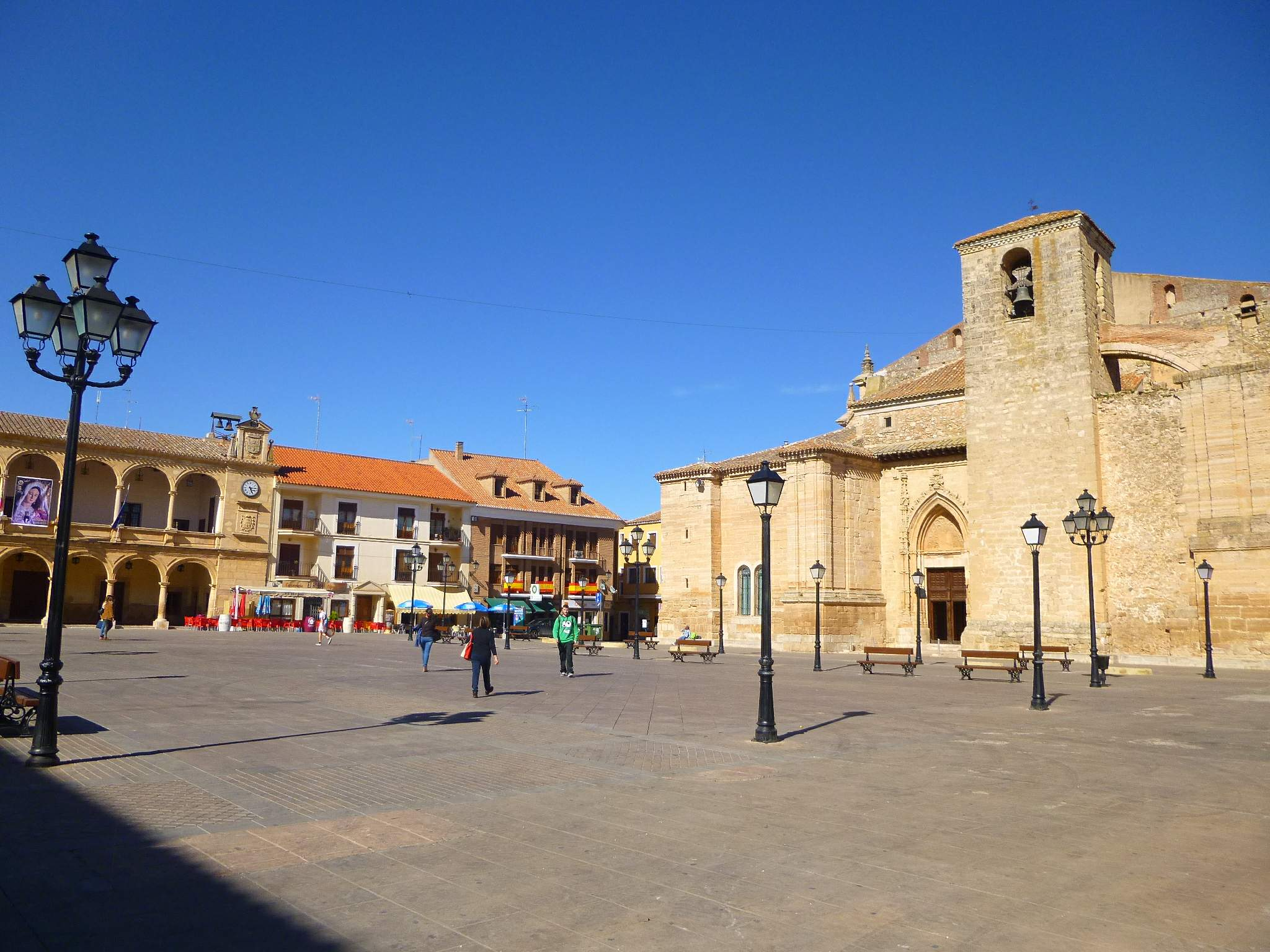
Villarrobledo is the province of Albacete's third largest municipality by population.

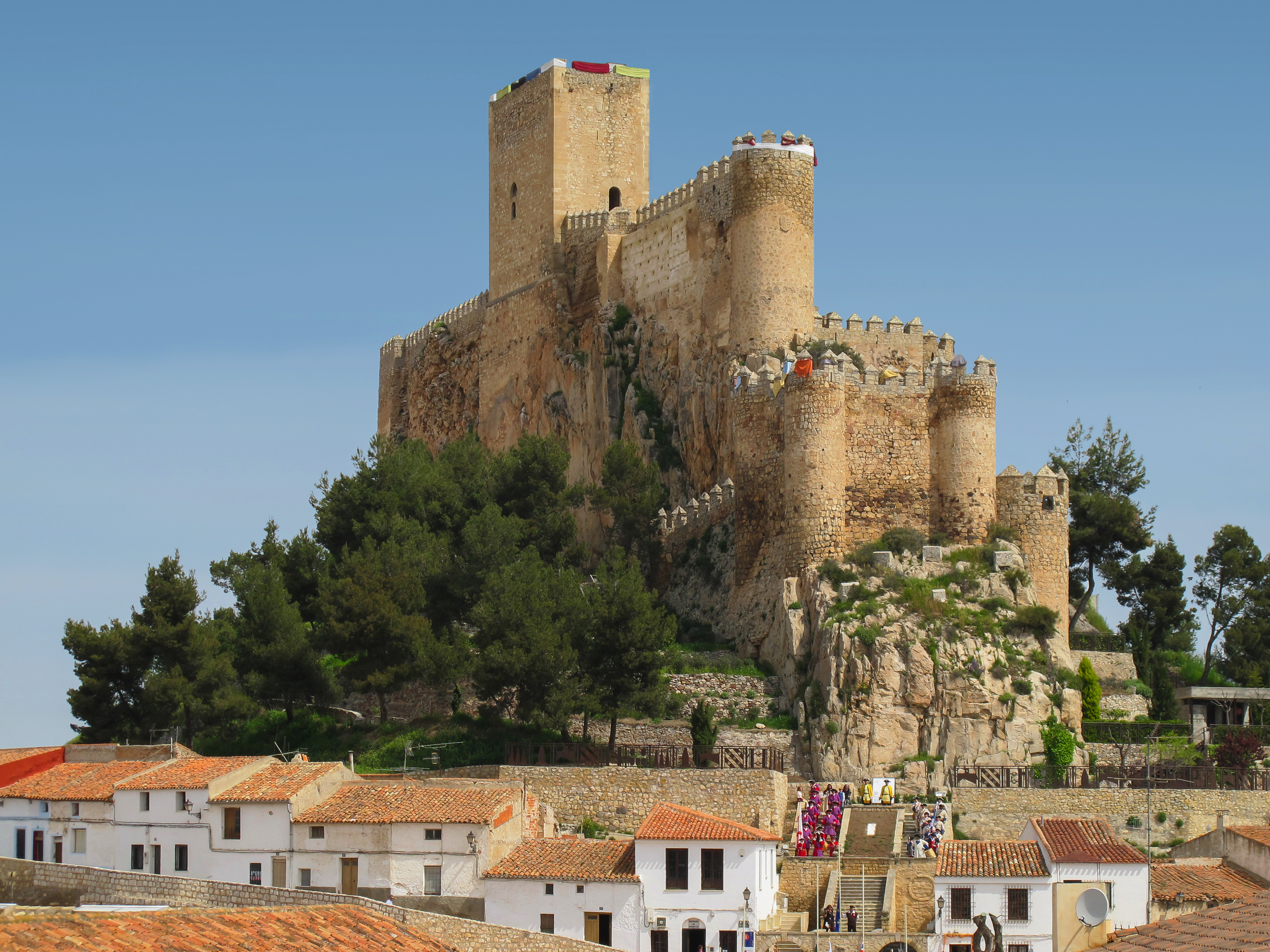
Almansa, the province of Albacete's fourth largest municipality by population

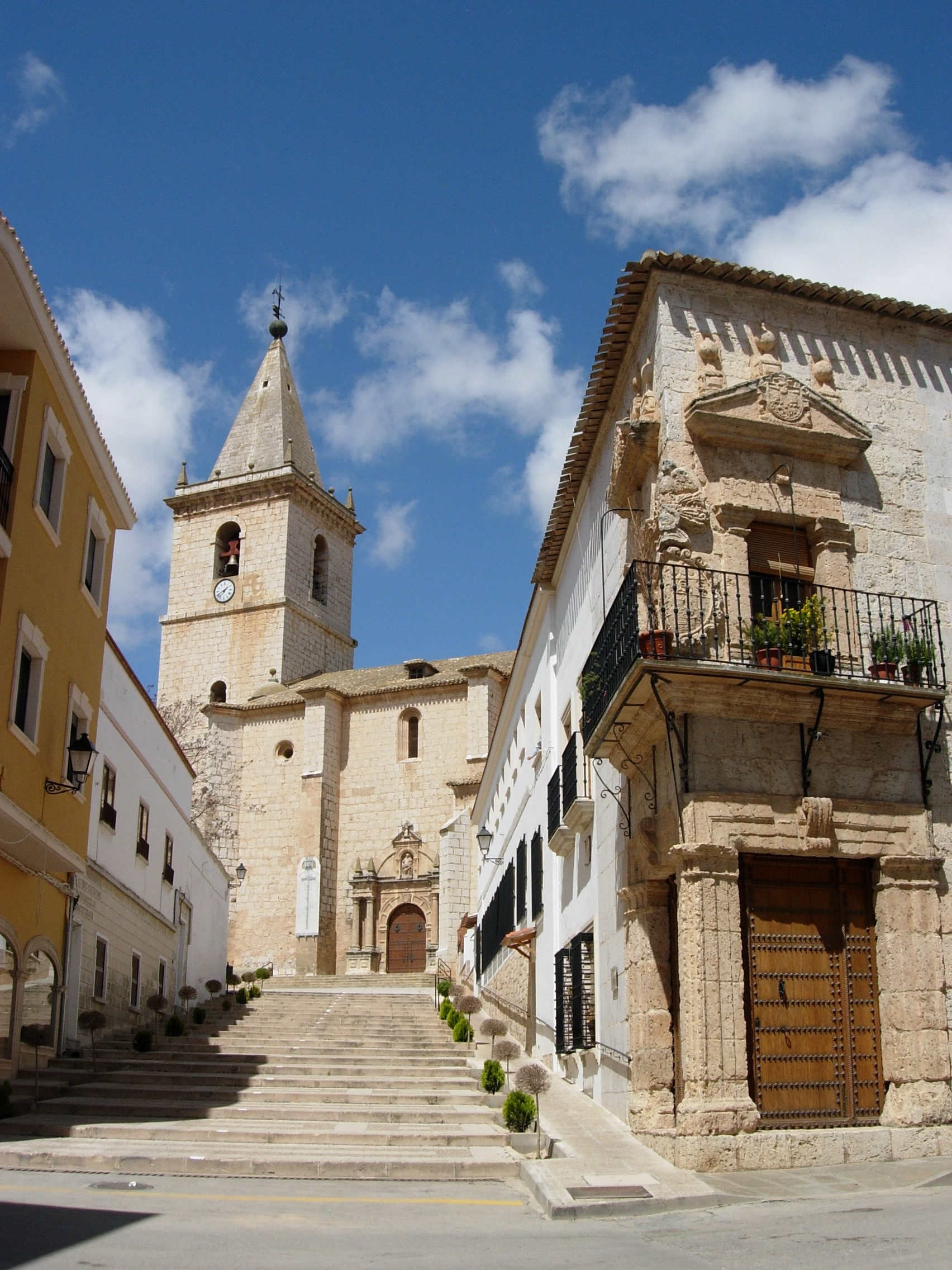
La Roda is the province of Albacete's fifth largest municipality by population.

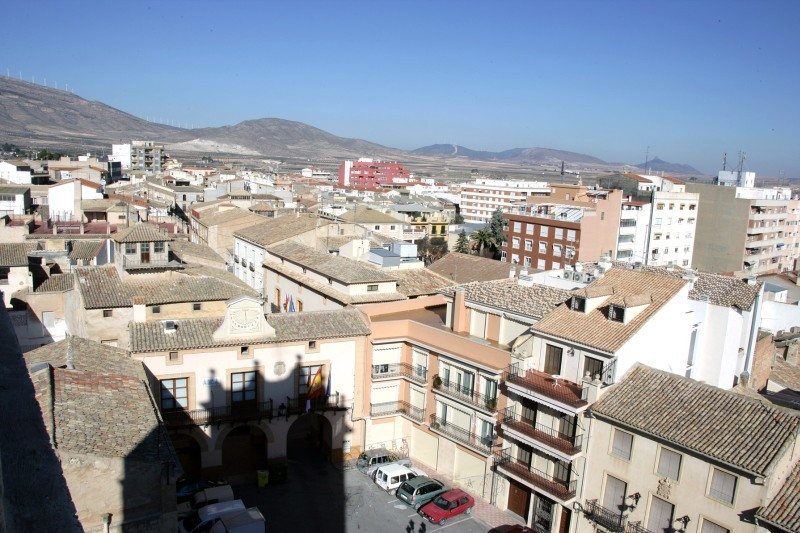
Caudete, the province of Albacete's sixth largest municipality by population

† Provincial capital

Municipalities in the province of Albacete
Name	Population (2023 census)	Population (2011 census)	Population change	Land area (km²)	Population density (2023)
Abengibre	768	859	−10.6%	30.76	25.0/km^{2}
Alatoz	503	587	−14.3%	63.85	7.9/km^{2}
Albacete†	173,202	171,999	+0.7%	1,126.98	153.7/km^{2}
Albatana	660	784	−15.8%	30.52	21.6/km^{2}
Alborea	680	830	−18.1%	71.86	9.5/km^{2}
Alcadozo	649	732	−11.3%	99.58	6.5/km^{2}
Alcalá del Júcar	1,114	1,335	−16.6%	146.82	7.6/km^{2}
Alcaraz	1,305	1,585	−17.7%	370.33	3.5/km^{2}
Almansa	24,246	25,316	−4.2%	532.40	45.5/km^{2}
Alpera	2,288	2,410	−5.1%	178.37	12.8/km^{2}
Aýna	611	788	−22.5%	146.58	4.2/km^{2}
Balazote	2,412	2,410	+0.1%	65.15	37.0/km^{2}
El Ballestero	414	459	−9.8%	138.69	3.0/km^{2}
Balsa de Ves	136	182	−25.3%	75.89	1.8/km^{2}
Barrax	1,877	2,010	−6.6%	189.77	9.9/km^{2}
Bienservida	568	703	−19.2%	91.43	6.2/km^{2}
Bogarra	746	1,007	−25.9%	166.01	4.5/km^{2}
Bonete	980	1,226	−20.1%	125.53	7.8/km^{2}
El Bonillo	2,646	3,010	−12.1%	502.86	5.3/km^{2}
Carcelén	490	633	−22.6%	75.36	6.5/km^{2}
Casas de Juan Núñez	1,350	1,433	−5.8%	88.98	15.2/km^{2}
Casas de Lázaro	326	453	−28.0%	112.31	2.9/km^{2}
Casas de Ves	561	711	−21.1%	125.40	4.5/km^{2}
Casas-Ibáñez	4,575	4,805	−4.8%	103.25	44.3/km^{2}
Caudete	10,171	10,460	−2.8%	141.23	72.0/km^{2}
Cenizate	1,163	1,243	−6.4%	63.26	18.4/km^{2}
Chinchilla de Monte-Aragón	4,606	4,081	+12.9%	679.27	6.8/km^{2}
Corral-Rubio	302	403	−25.1%	94.75	3.2/km^{2}
Cotillas	130	157	−17.2%	14.46	9.0/km^{2}
Elche de la Sierra	3,570	3,937	−9.3%	239.49	14.9/km^{2}
Férez	619	737	−16.0%	126.15	4.9/km^{2}
Fuensanta	297	369	−19.5%	24.11	12.3/km^{2}
Fuente-Álamo	2,438	2,657	−8.2%	133.37	18.3/km^{2}
Fuentealbilla	1,828	1,981	−7.7%	108.29	16.9/km^{2}
La Gineta	2,601	2,576	+1.0%	137.13	19.0/km^{2}
Golosalvo	92	119	−22.7%	28.17	3.3/km^{2}
Hellín	30,499	31,202	−2.3%	779.29	39.1/km^{2}
La Herrera	314	350	−10.3%	63.42	5.0/km^{2}
Higueruela	1,150	1,296	−11.3%	205.45	5.6/km^{2}
Hoya-Gonzalo	624	745	−16.2%	114.57	5.4/km^{2}
Jorquera	345	425	−18.8%	67.94	5.1/km^{2}
Letur	928	1,073	−13.5%	264.40	3.5/km^{2}
Lezuza	1,302	1,585	−17.9%	360.61	3.6/km^{2}
Liétor	1,077	1,406	−23.4%	313.18	3.4/km^{2}
Madrigueras	4,680	4,847	−3.4%	73.34	63.8/km^{2}
Mahora	1,496	1,432	+4.5%	108.14	13.8/km^{2}
Masegoso	139	117	+18.8%	103.87	1.3/km^{2}
Minaya	1,455	1,679	−13.3%	69.98	20.8/km^{2}
Molinicos	829	1,012	−18.1%	143.58	5.8/km^{2}
Montalvos	89	127	−29.9%	24.66	3.6/km^{2}
Montealegre del Castillo	2,041	2,240	−8.9%	177.41	11.5/km^{2}
Motilleja	665	588	+13.1%	23.82	27.9/km^{2}
Munera	3,409	3,753	−9.2%	230.53	14.8/km^{2}
Navas de Jorquera	516	550	−6.2%	42.25	12.2/km^{2}
Nerpio	1,175	1,476	−20.4%	436.74	2.7/km^{2}
Ontur	1,917	2,239	−14.4%	54.40	35.2/km^{2}
Ossa de Montiel	2,213	2,633	−16.0%	243.70	9.1/km^{2}
Paterna del Madera	353	440	−19.8%	112.33	3.1/km^{2}
Peñas de San Pedro	1,458	1,354	+7.7%	158.76	9.2/km^{2}
Peñascosa	331	391	−15.3%	189.25	1.7/km^{2}
Pétrola	670	820	−18.3%	74.60	9.0/km^{2}
Povedilla	396	536	−26.1%	49.42	8.0/km^{2}
Pozo Cañada	2,713	2,865	−5.3%	116.83	23.2/km^{2}
Pozohondo	1,553	1,788	−13.1%	136.42	11.4/km^{2}
Pozo-Lorente	390	449	−13.1%	80.98	4.8/km^{2}
Pozuelo	469	573	−18.2%	133.97	3.5/km^{2}
La Recueja	221	310	−28.7%	29.37	7.5/km^{2}
Riópar	1,323	1,466	−9.8%	81.00	16.3/km^{2}
Robledo	396	459	−13.7%	120.08	3.3/km^{2}
La Roda	15,632	16,325	−4.2%	397.88	39.3/km^{2}
Salobre	435	585	−25.6%	49.52	8.8/km^{2}
San Pedro	1,187	1,297	−8.5%	83.11	14.3/km^{2}
Socovos	1,704	1,952	−12.7%	139.12	12.2/km^{2}
Tarazona de la Mancha	6,156	6,678	−7.8%	212.67	28.9/km^{2}
Tobarra	7,819	8,195	−4.6%	325.21	24.0/km^{2}
Valdeganga	1,968	1,981	−0.7%	70.65	27.9/km^{2}
Vianos	322	405	−20.5%	128.05	2.5/km^{2}
Villa de Ves	61	54	+13.0%	57.75	1.1/km^{2}
Villalgordo del Júcar	1,110	1,230	−9.8%	46.68	23.8/km^{2}
Villamalea	3,953	4,110	−3.8%	128.32	30.8/km^{2}
Villapalacios	556	685	−18.8%	87.47	6.4/km^{2}
Villarrobledo	25,090	26,526	−5.4%	862.39	29.1/km^{2}
Villatoya	114	131	−13.0%	18.67	6.1/km^{2}
Villavaliente	209	271	−22.9%	34.84	6.0/km^{2}
Villaverde de Guadalimar	311	405	−23.2%	69.28	4.5/km^{2}
Viveros	308	358	−14.0%	65.36	4.7/km^{2}
Yeste	2,504	3,183	−21.3%	509.38	4.9/km^{2}
Province of Albacete	387,529	401,580	−3.5%	14,922.19	26.0/km^{2}
Castilla–La Mancha	2,084,086	2,106,331	−1.1%	79,410.62	26.2/km^{2}
Spain	48,085,361	46,815,916	+2.7%	504,755.17	95.3/km^{2}

== See also ==
- Geography of Spain
- List of municipalities of Spain
