= Comarca Mancha del Júcar =

Mancha del Júcar
- Comarca
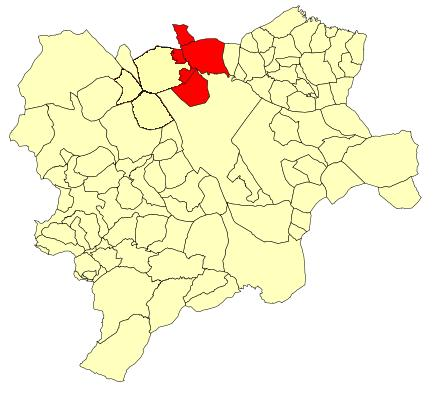

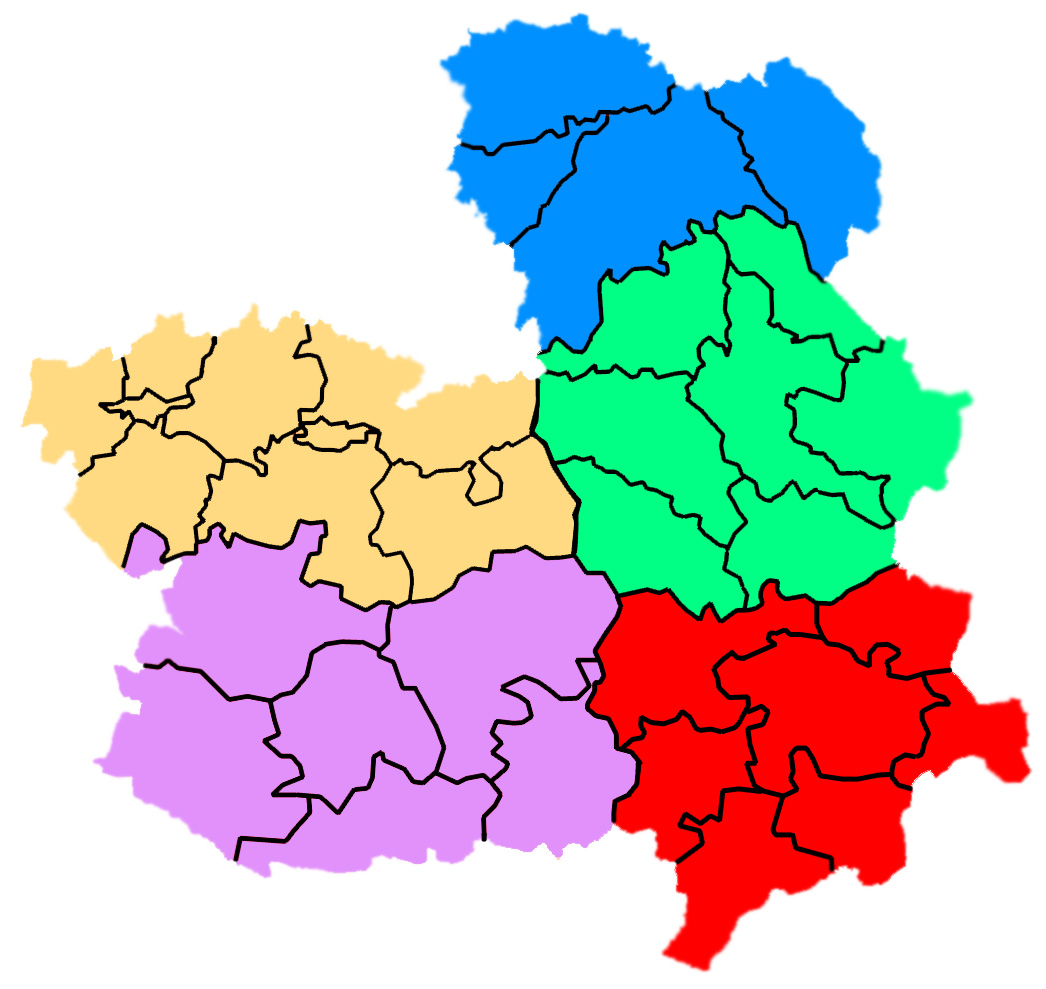
- Country: Spain
- Community: Castilla-La Mancha
- Province: Albacete
- Capital and largest city: Tarazona de la Mancha
- Municipalities: 5 municipalities: Fuensanta; Madrigueras; Montalvos; Tarazona de la Mancha; Villalgordo del Júcar

Area
  - Total: 381 km^{2} (147 sq mi)

Population
  - Total: 12,998
- Source: NSI Spain National Statistics Institute (Spain) (01-01-2005)

Comarca Mancha del Júcar is a comarca of the Province of Albacete, Spain.
