= Almansa (DO) =

Coordinates: 38°51′N 1°05′W

Almansa DOP
- Wine region
- Almansa DOP in the province of Albacete in the region of Castile-La Mancha
- Official name: D.O.P. Almansa
- Type: Denominación de Origen Protegida (DOP)
- Year established: 1966
- Country: Spain
- Size of planted vineyards: 7,200 hectares (17,792 acres)
- No. of wineries: 12
- Wine produced: 39,841 hectolitres
- Comments: Data for 2016 / 2017

Almansa is a Spanish Denominación de Origen Protegida (DOP), known for its red wines, located in the southeast of the province of Albacete (Castile-La Mancha, Spain), in the transition zone between the high central plateau (La Mancha) and the Mediterranean Sea. The vineyards are mostly around the towns of Almansa, Alpera, Bonete, Corral-Rubio, Higueruela, Hoya-Gonzalo, Pétrola and El Villar de Chinchilla.

== History ==
During the Middle Ages, Almansa was a frontier region between Moorish and Christian kingdoms. Almansa Castle (Castillo de Almansa) was built by the Moors to protect the Vinalopo Valley (Valle de Vinalopó) which was for a long time the frontier between the Christian kingdoms of Castile and Aragón.

== Climate ==
The climate is continental (long, hot summers, cold winters). Rainfall is sparse (350 mm per annum) and sporadic usually in spring and autumn in the form of violent storms, often in the form of hail. Temperatures can reach 38 °C in summer and −6 °C in winter.

== Soil ==
Most of the vineyards are on flat land at altitudes of between 700 and 1000 m above sea level, comprising permeable lime-bearing soils that are poor in nutrients.

== Grapes ==
The authorised grape varieties are:

- Red: Monastrell, Cencibel, Garnacha Tintorera, Garnacha, Cabernet Sauvignon, Merlot, Syrah, Petit Verdot
- White: Verdejo, Chardonnay, Sauvignon blanc, Moscatel de Grano Menudo

The vines are planted with a maximum density of 1,600 vines/ha.
