= Tarazona de la Mancha =

Municipality in Albacete, Castile-La Mancha, Spain

Coordinates: 39°15′54″N 1°54′46″W

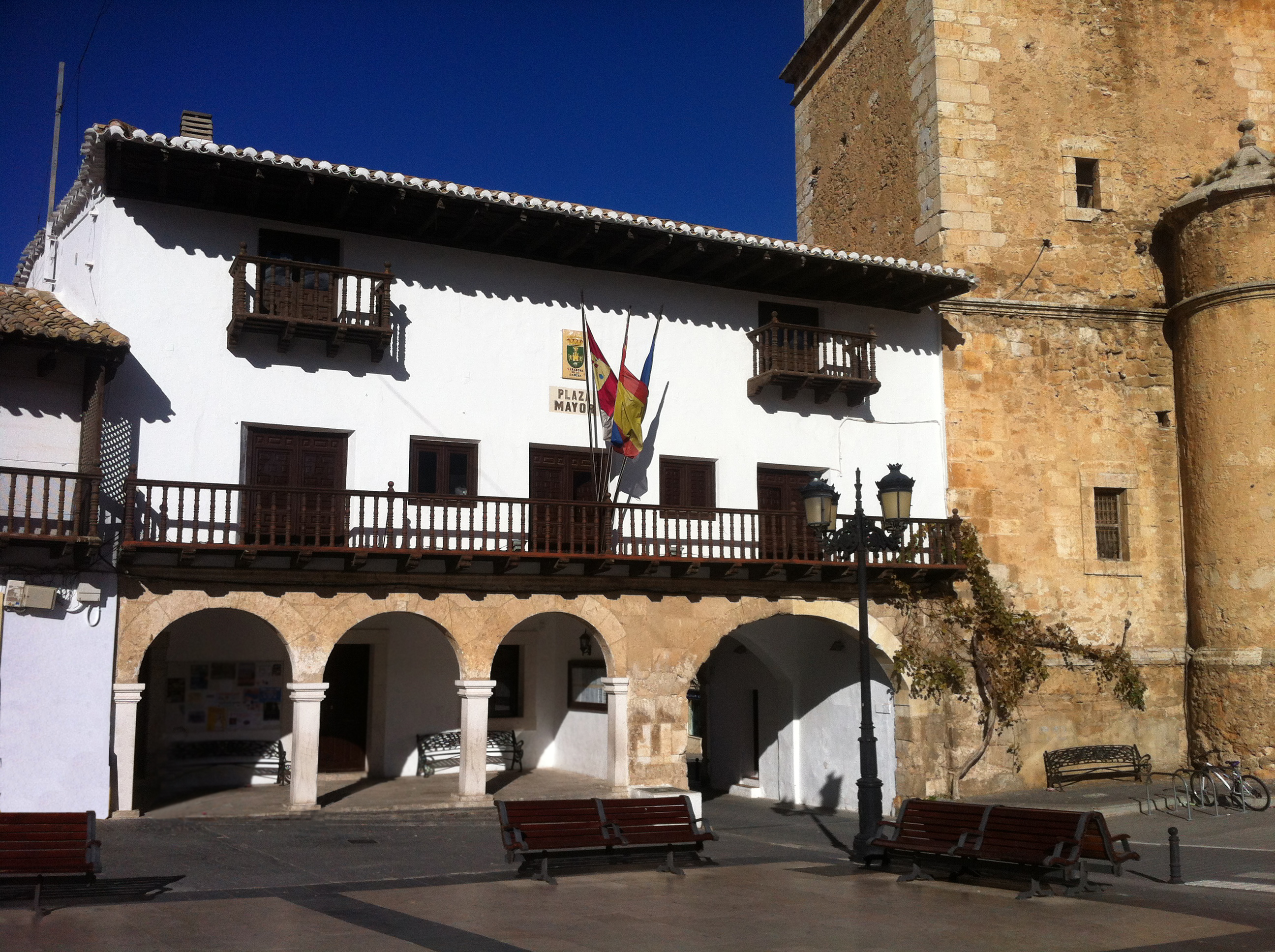
Town Hall of Tarazona de la Mancha

Coat of arms of Tarazona de la Mancha

Tarazona de la Mancha is a municipality in the province of Albacete in the Autonomous community of Castile-La Mancha, Spain. It had a population of 6,647 at the 2011 census.

== Geography ==
Tarazona de la Mancha is located in the north of Albacete along the border with Cuenca Provence. On the south the municipality borders the municipality of La Gineta. On the east it borders Madrigueras. To the west it borders Montalvos, La Roda, Fuensanta and Villalgordo del Júcar. To the north it borders the municipalities of Quintanar del Rey and Villagarcía del Llano located in the province of Cuenca.

The municipality has an area of 212 square kilometers. The Valdemembra River, a tributary of the Júcar River flows through the municipality. The Júcar forms the southern boundary of Tarazona de la Mancha.

== Demographics ==
- 1900 = 4,865
- 1910 = 5,545
- 1920 = 5,955
- 1930 = 6,302
- 1940 = 6,714
- 1950 = 7,111
- 1960 = 6,850
- 1970 = 5,952
- 1981 = 6,011
- 1991 = 5,747
- 1996 = 5,976
- 2001 = 6,179
- 2005 = 6,576
- 2011 = 6,746

At least as late as 1940 a distinct town population was kept, not including the full municipal area but only the central settled part. The town in that year had a population of 5,892.

== History ==
The "Carta arqueológica de Tarazona de la Mancha" made in 1978 by Cayo Tomás González and Matías Muñoz stated that the area was a site of Second Bronze Age culture, Iberian Culture, Roman Culture and Late Medieval Culture based on archeological remains.

There is a bridge over the Valdemembra River built during Roman times. Remains of a Roman villa have also been found here.

The village of Tarazona was settled in the late 15th century by migrants from Villanueva de la Jara. On 11 October 1564 Tarazaona was granted the status of village. The Church of San Bartolomé (Tarazona de la Mancha) was built in the seventeenth century.

When the provinces of Spain were created around 1710, Tarazona was put in the province of Cuenca. It was transferred to Albacete Province in 1833.

During the Spanish Civil War the author Laurie Lee passed through the town while serving in the International Brigades, offering the following description:

Tarazona de la Mancha looked hard and grim, a piece of rusted Castilian iron. The poverty of the snow-daubed hovels, huddled round the slushy square, gave an appearance of almost Siberian dejection. Squat, padded figures crept slowly about, each wrapped in a separate cocoon; and the harsh silence of the place and the people seemed to be sharing one purposeless imprisonment, where nothing soft, warm, tender or charitable could be looked for any more. This was a Spain stretched dead on a slab, a frozen cadaver, where, for all our early enthusiasms, we seemed to have come too late, not as defenders but as midnight scavengers.

== Sources ==
- Tarazona website
