= El Ballestero =

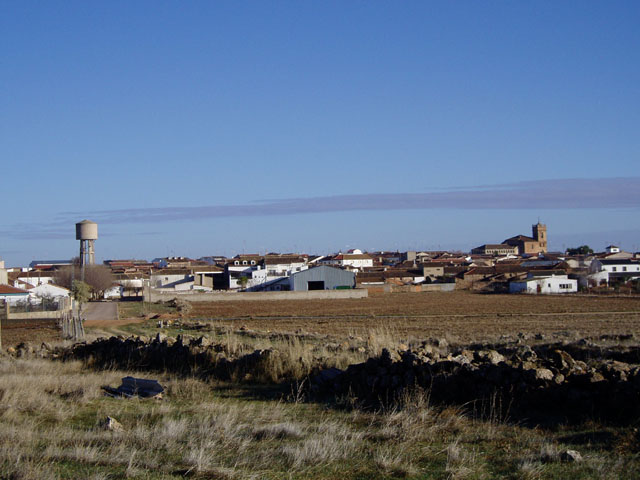

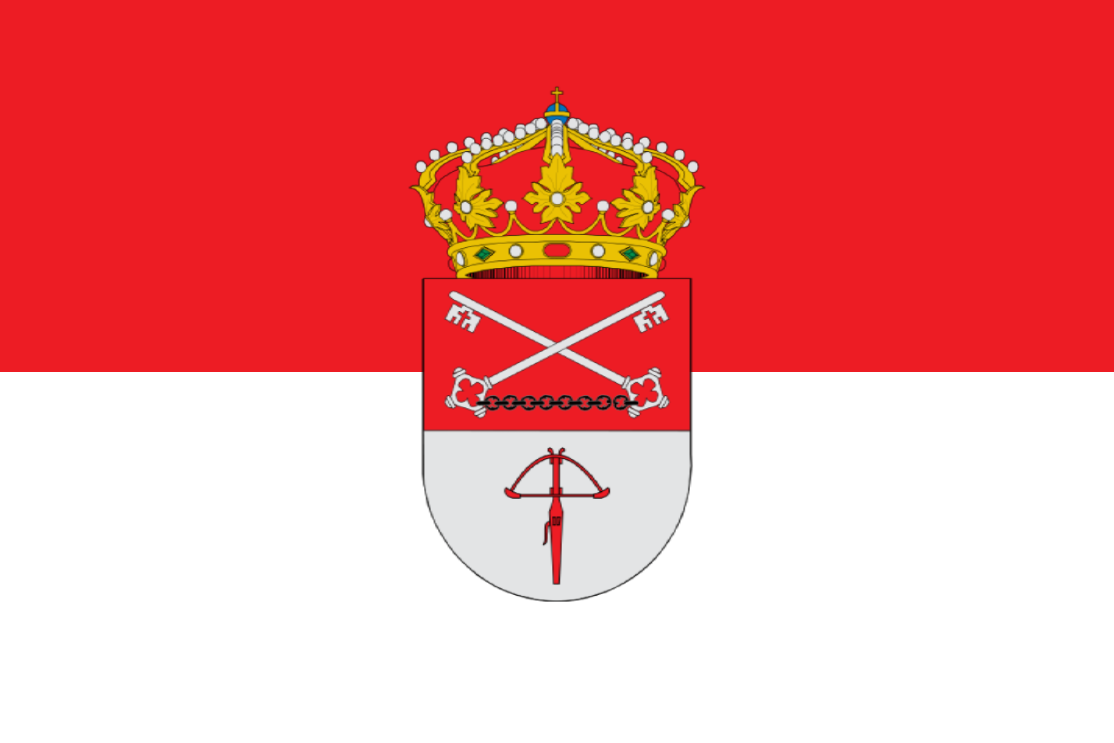
- Flag Coat of arms

- Location of El Ballestero El Ballestero (Castilla-La Mancha) El Ballestero (Spain)
- Coordinates: 38°51′N 2°27′W
- Country: Spain
- Autonomous Community: Castile-La Mancha
- Province: Albacete
- Comarca: Campo de Montiel

Government
  - Mayor (since 2017): Verónica Gómez Gallego (PSOE)

Area
  - Total: 138.69 km^{2} (53.55 sq mi)
- Elevation: 1,029 m (3,376 ft)

Population (2025-01-01)
  - Total: 411
  - Density: 2.96/km^{2} (7.68/sq mi)
- Postal code: 02614
- Area code: 967 38 40

El Ballestero is a municipality in the province of Albacete, located within the autonomous community of Castilla–La Mancha, Spain. It is located 68 km west of Albacete, situated along the main road between Munera and Robledo.

== History ==
The origins of El Ballestero are traditionally linked to a meeting between King Alfonso X of Castile and his son-in-law, Jaime I of Aragón, during which they negotiated the ownership of recently conquered territories. According to local legend, the town was settled by crossbowmen (Spanish: ballesteros) who had become redundant following the cessation of hostilities. Over time, a settlement developed around a strategic crossroads.

Like many small towns in La Mancha, El Ballestero lost a significant share of its population in the mid-20th century. In the 1949 census, El Ballestero had 1,858 inhabitants, and the population shrank over the following decades. In 1964, the peak emigration year, over 500 inhabitants left El Ballestero. Many of these emigrants moved to large cities and the coast, where employment opportunities had increased in the growing tourist industry. In recent years, many abandoned homes in El Ballestero have been purchased by people from Madrid, Valencia, and other urban areas, who have refurbished them as second homes.

== Facilities ==
The town hosts an 18th-century church built in the Renaissance style, two bars serving food, a supermarket, a pharmacy, a bakery, a hairdresser, a public library, a bank, a school, and an Olympic-sized swimming pool which is open to the public in July and August. On weekends, a music bar opens its doors. There is also a small market held on Thursdays. Various guest houses (casas rurales) and a small hotel also exist.

== Economy ==
El Ballestero's main industries include farming (such as wheat and barley) and raising livestock (mostly lamb). There is also an embutidos and ham factory.

El Ballestero uses green energy in the form of wind turbines.

== Tourism ==
The town is on the Ruta de Don Quijote, and nearby attractions include Libisosa, the remains of a Roman town near Lezuza; Alcaraz, a medieval town; Las Lagunas de Ruidera; and the Sierra de Alcaraz, a home to wildlife. El Santuario de Nuestra Señora de Cortes is also nearby.

In addition to the fictional hero Don Quixote, Hannibal, the Carthaginian general famous for having almost conquered Rome in the 3rd century BCE also passed close to the town along a prehistoric track that crosses the Iberian Peninsula; this ancient road was rebuilt by the Romans, and some 800 meters remain in good condition north of town. The Cañada Real de Los Serranos, which forms part of the medieval network of cattle tracks across Spain between Cordoba and Teruel is slightly further north.

== Climate ==
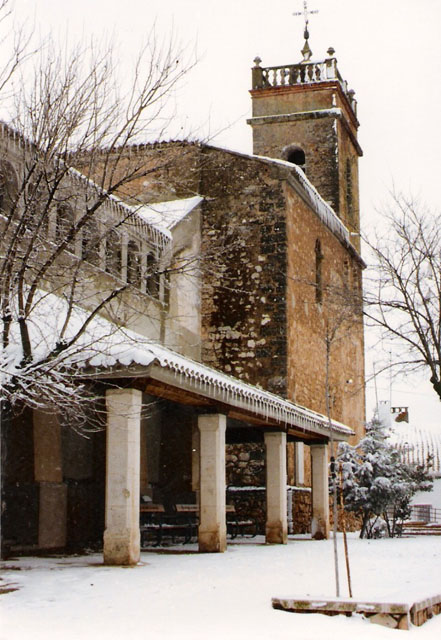
The church of St Laurence

In summer, the temperature during the day is significantly hotter than in coastal towns such as Benidorm. However, because of its elevation of 3,000 feet (1,045 meters) above sea level, the nights stay cool even in midsummer.

In autumn, the town is popular among those who hunt the abundant hares, rabbits, and partridges.

In winter, the temperature can fall well below zero, and snow falls several times a year.

The main local holidays are San Lorenzo (10 August) and San Miguel (29 September).

== Virgen de la Encarnación ==
A local tradition that takes place on Whitsunday and the Feast of St. Michael is the Virgen de la Encarnación, celebrating events that took place 400 years ago. According to tradition, in the 17th century, a severe plague outbreak occurred in Villalgordal, a small village 14 km south of El Ballestero. This epidemic killed most of the population; this was possibly the Great Plague of Seville of 1646 to 1652. Once it was over, the survivors decided to burn down the village on health grounds and moved to the surrounding towns. The majority came to El Ballestero and brought with them their "Virgen de la Encarnación", a statue of the Virgin Mary slightly smaller than life size, to place in the local church. Each Whitsunday, the villagers come together and carry her over the old track to the site of Villalgordal, which is now a stony field, with a small refurbished chapel in the middle of it overlooking a river. Once they get to Villalgordal, the Virgin is returned to her original home in the chapel and a mass is celebrated. The town then provides a meal for all the participants and spectators. Once this is over, the chapel is locked and the townsfolk return home.

On 29 September, during the Fiesta de San Miguel, there is another Mass at Villalgordal, and after another meal, it is carried back to El Ballestero being met at the entrance to the town by floats depicting local life. It is escorted back to the church whilst bonfires are lit in celebration of her return. This is followed by a firework display.

The statue spends the winter in the church and is returned to its summer chapel the following year. This tradition dates to 400 years ago.
