= Campo de Montiel =

Campo de Montiel may refer to:

- Campo de Montiel (Albacete)
- Campo de Montiel (Ciudad Real)
