= Fuensanta =

Fuensanta may refer to:

- Fuensanta, Albacete, a municipality in Albacete, Castile-La Mancha, Spain.
- The Virgin Mary in Murcia, Spain.
- La Fuensanta, a painting by Julio Romero de Torres.
