= Abengibre Creek =

River in Spain

Coordinates: 39°10′N 1°31′W

The arroyo, cañada, or rambla de Abengibre is a seasonal water stream (rambla or arroyo) tributary to the Júcar, discharging into the former in Jorquera, province of Albacete, in the autonomous community of Castilla–La Mancha, Spain.

The upper course is known as arroyo de Ledaña. The final stretch of the rambla features embedded meanders and steep gorges produced by river erosion.
