= Province of Albacete =

Province of Spain

Province of Albacete Provincia de Albacete
- Province
- Flag Coat of arms

- Location of the Province of Albacete in Spain
- Coordinates: 38°50′N 2°00′W
- Country: Spain
- Autonomous community: Castilla–La Mancha
- Capital: Albacete
- Municipalities: 87 (list)

Government
  - Type: Diputación
  - Body: Provincial Deputation of Albacete
  - President: Santiago Cabañero Masip (PSOE)

Area
  - Total: 14,931.74 km^{2} (5,765.18 sq mi)
  - Rank: 9th in Spain
- 3.0% of Spain
- Highest elevation (La Atalaya): 2,083 m (6,834 ft)

Population (2025)
  - Total: 390,751
  - Rank: 34th in Spain
  - Density: 26.1692/km^{2} (67.7778/sq mi)
- 0.8% of Spain
- Demonym(s): Albaceteño/-a, albacetense
- Time zone: UTC+1 (CET)
  - Summer (DST): UTC+2 (CEST)
- Website: dipualba.es

The Province of Albacete (Spanish: Provincia de Albacete [albaˈθete]) is a province of central Spain, in the southern part of the autonomous community of Castile–La Mancha. Its capital, the homonymous city of Albacete, is 262 kilometres (163 mi) by road southeast of Madrid.

The province has a population of 390,751 in an area of 14,931.74 square kilometres (5,765.18 sq mi) across its 87 municipalities.

== History ==
The territory occupied by the province of Albacete has been inhabited since ancient times, as evidenced by cave paintings in the Cueva del Niño and Cueva de la Vieja. In Roman times, the territory of the present province of Albacete was part of Carpetania and Celtiberia, Contestania, Bastetania and Oretania. The Romans built a significant settlement at Libisosa, and during the age of the Visigoths, Tolmo de Minateda grew in prominence.

During the Muslim era, territories of the province were under different zones of influence, and numerous farmhouses, castles and watchtowers developed to fight off invaders. A number of battles were held here in the Middle Ages, and on April 25, 1707, the Battle of Almansa was held in the vicinity of the town of Albacete, a major Spanish battle which culminated in the triumph of Philip V who ascended to the throne, establishing the monarchy for the House of Bourbon in Spain.

In 1822, the short-lived Province of Chinchilla was created, composed of municipalities in the provinces of La Mancha, Cuenca and the Kingdom of Murcia. Its capital at Chinchilla de Monte-Aragón, very close to the city of Albacete, would be the basis on which the province of Albacete was created in 1833 as dictated by Javier de Burgos. Following the adoption of the Constitution in 1978, the province of Albacete joined the Castile-La Mancha Region from the Murcia Region, and its Statute of Autonomy was approved in 1982.

== Geography ==
Located in the southeast of the Central Plateau, the province of Albacete is bordered by the provinces of Granada, Murcia, Alicante, Valencia, Cuenca, Ciudad Real and Jaén. The province is divided into 87 municipalities and seven judicial districts. Its seat of government is Albacete. Other important towns (with more than 10,000 inhabitants) are: Hellín, Villarrobledo, Almansa, La Roda and Caudete. The main river of the province is the Jucar river, which crosses the province in the northeast, renowned for its deep gorges and trees. The Lagunese de Ruidera flows in the west. Other rivers of note include the Cabriel on the far northeastern border, the Salobral, Navalcudi, and Tajo-Segura in the central part, the Corcoles in the northwest, and the Guadalmena, Mundo, Tus, Segura, and Taibilla rivers in the south. It is also home to seasonal rivers, including Abengibre Creek. The highest point of the province is La Atalaya standing at 2083 metres above sea level in the Sierra de las Cabras.

=== Municipalities ===
The province has 87 municipalities:

- Abengibre
- Alatoz
- Albacete
- Albatana
- Alborea
- Alcadozo
- Alcalá del Júcar
- Alcaraz
- Almansa
- Alpera
- Aýna
- Balazote
- El Ballestero
- Balsa de Ves
- Barrax
- Bienservida
- Bogarra
- Bonete
- El Bonillo
- Carcelén
- Casas de Juan Núñez
- Casas de Lázaro
- Casas de Ves
- Casas-Ibáñez
- Caudete
- Cenizate
- Chinchilla de Monte-Aragón
- Corral-Rubio
- Cotillas
- Elche de la Sierra
- Férez
- Fuensanta
- Fuente-Álamo
- Fuentealbilla
- La Gineta
- Golosalvo
- Hellín
- La Herrera
- Higueruela
- Hoya-Gonzalo
- Jorquera
- Letur
- Lezuza
- Liétor
- Madrigueras
- Mahora
- Masegoso
- Minaya
- Molinicos
- Montalvos
- Montealegre del Castillo
- Motilleja
- Munera
- Navas de Jorquera
- Nerpio
- Ontur
- Ossa de Montiel
- Paterna del Madera
- Peñas de San Pedro
- Peñascosa
- Pétrola
- Povedilla
- Pozo Cañada
- Pozohondo
- Pozo-Lorente
- Pozuelo
- La Recueja
- Riópar
- Robledo
- La Roda
- Salobre
- San Pedro
- Socovos
- Tarazona de la Mancha
- Tobarra
- Valdeganga
- Vianos
- Villa de Ves
- Villalgordo del Júcar
- Villamalea
- Villapalacios
- Villarrobledo
- Villatoya
- Villavaliente
- Villaverde de Guadalimar
- Viveros
- Yeste

== Demographics ==
As of 2025, the population is 390,751, of which 50.2% are male, and 49.8% are female. Minors make up 16.1% of the population, and seniors make up 20.8%.

Historical population

Year	Pop.	±%
1842	189,120	—
1857	201,118	+6.3%
1877	219,009	+8.9%
1887	231,591	+5.7%
1900	241,244	+4.2%
1910	271,716	+12.6%
1920	296,712	+9.2%
1930	334,371	+12.7%
1940	379,169	+13.4%

Year	Pop.	±%
1950	400,731	+5.7%
1960	375,175	−6.4%
1970	340,720	−9.2%
1981	339,373	−0.4%
1991	342,677	+1.0%
2001	364,835	+6.5%
2011	401,580	+10.1%
2021	386,726	−3.7%

Source: INE

=== Immigration ===
As of 2025, immigrants make up 11.8% of the population. The 5 largest foreign countries of birth are Morocco, Colombia, Romania, Bolivia, and Ecuador.

== Economy ==
In 2020, the total value of products produced in Albacete was US$1.03 billion.
