= Tus (river) =

River in Spain

Coordinates: 38°23′N 2°13′W

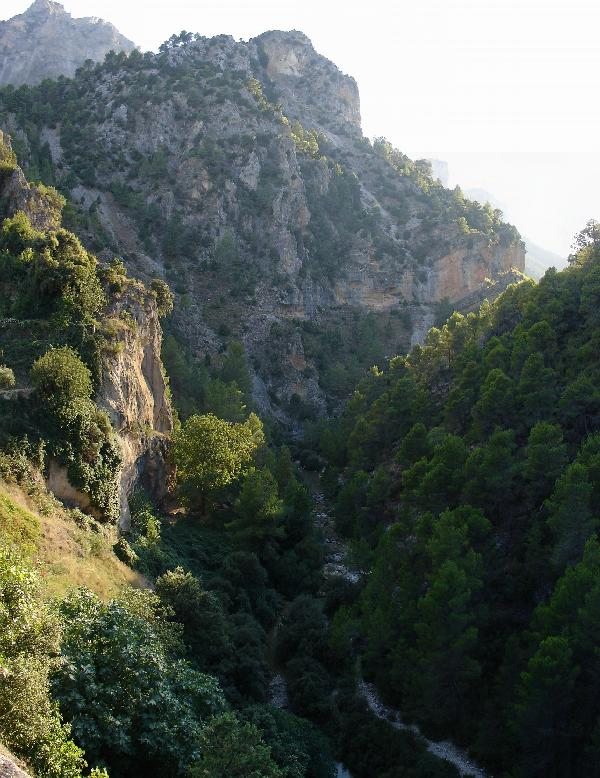
Tus (river)

Tus is a river of the Province of Albacete, Spain.
