= San Pedro, Albacete =

San Pedro
- Municipality
- Coat of arms

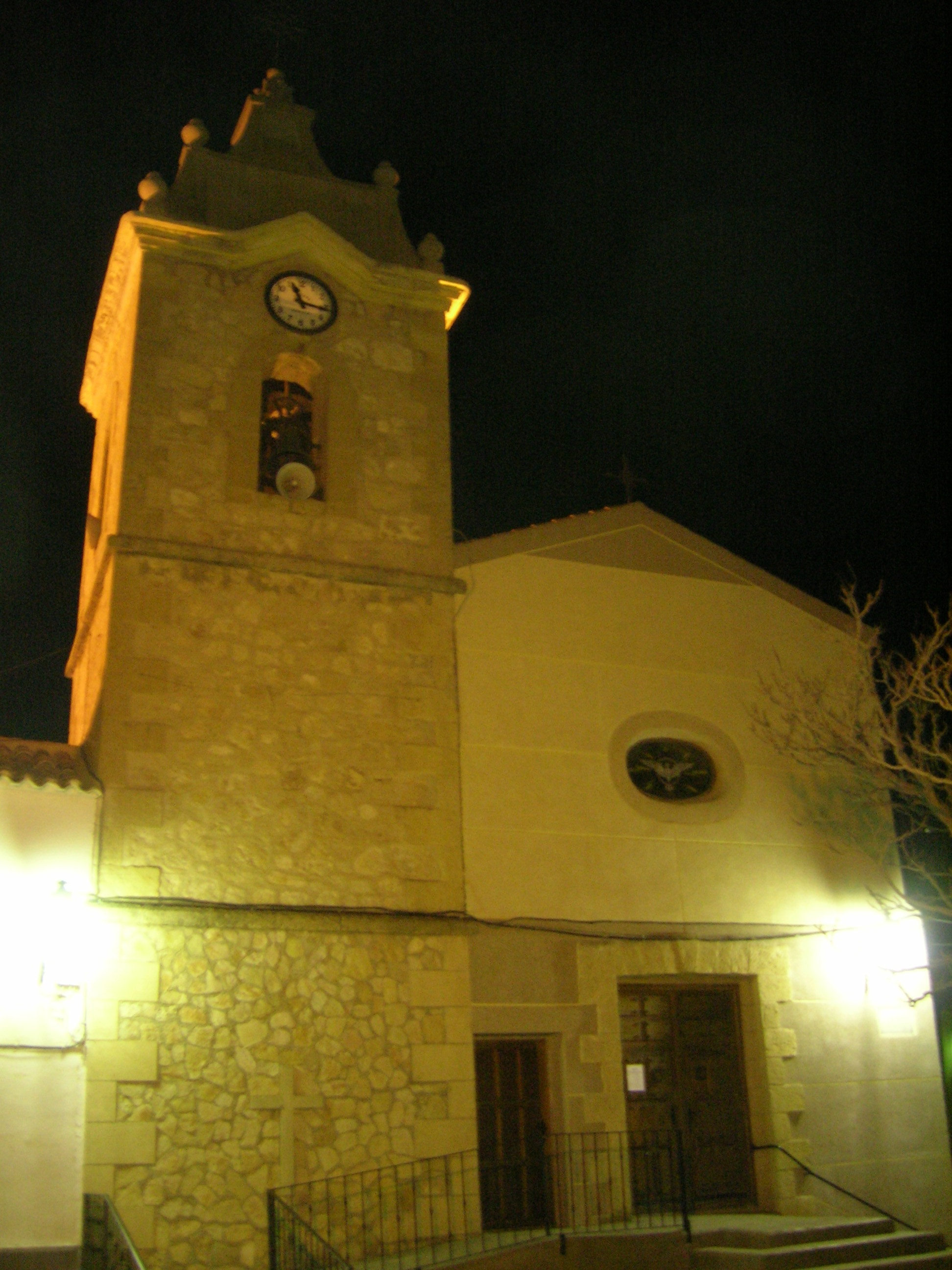

- Location in Spain
- Coordinates: 38°49.6′N 2°11.2′W
- Country: Spain
- Autonomous community: Castilla–La Mancha
- Province: Albacete
- Judicial district: Albacete
- Commonwealth: Sierra de Alcaraz y Campo de Montiel

Government
  - Alcalde: El pueblo

Area
  - Total: 83.12 km^{2} (32.09 sq mi)
- Elevation: 836 m (2,743 ft)

Population (2025-01-01)
  - Total: 1,155
  - Density: 13.90/km^{2} (35.99/sq mi)
- Demonym(s): Sampedreño,-ña
- Time zone: UTC+1 (CET)
  - Summer (DST): UTC+2 (CEST)
- Postal code: 02326
- Dialing code: (+34) 967 35 ** **
- Official language(s): Spanish

San Pedro, Albacete is a municipality in Albacete, Castilla–La Mancha, Spain. It has a population of 1,319. It is located 36 kilometers from Albacete. Nearby towns: Pozuelo, Balazote or Casas de Lázaro.

San Pedro was once a watering hole for animals with water from the river Quéjola. It was also a stopping place for hikers and herders.

== Places of interest ==
In San Pedro stands the church of St. Peter the Apostle. Its construction is based on a central nave and the tower of the church, which was completed in 1846, the year in which San Pedro became independent and was established as a municipality.

The parks of La fuente and Cañada juncosa give opportunity for rest and spending the day. Peñica, a small lookout rock where there are the water tanks of the village, provides a viewing point of San Pedro and the municipality.

== Celebrations and customs ==
San Pedro has the festivities in honor of Saint Peter (29 June) from late June to early July. At this time, the procession of the image pattern is celebrated by taking the streets. It also has the festivities of Pilar (12 October), also patron of the town.

Iluminarias in honor of Santa Lucia where they make many fires around town. The day of San Isidro, which hosts competitions food and tractors, etc..

Highlights of gastronomy include fritillas, ajo de mataero, caracoles en su salsa, atascaburras, tajás de cerdo, ajopringue and pisto.

== Curiosities ==
"La Luz del Pardal" is a paranormal phenomenon that occurs in the road connecting the town of San Pedro with Casas de Lázaro, near the river Quéjola.
