= Sierra de Alcaraz y Campo de Montiel =

Comarca in Spain

Coordinates: 38°45′36″N 2°23′03″W

Sierra de Alcaraz y Campo de Montiel is a comarca of the Province of Albacete, Spain.
