= Masegoso =

Coordinates: 38°57′0″N 2°21′0″W

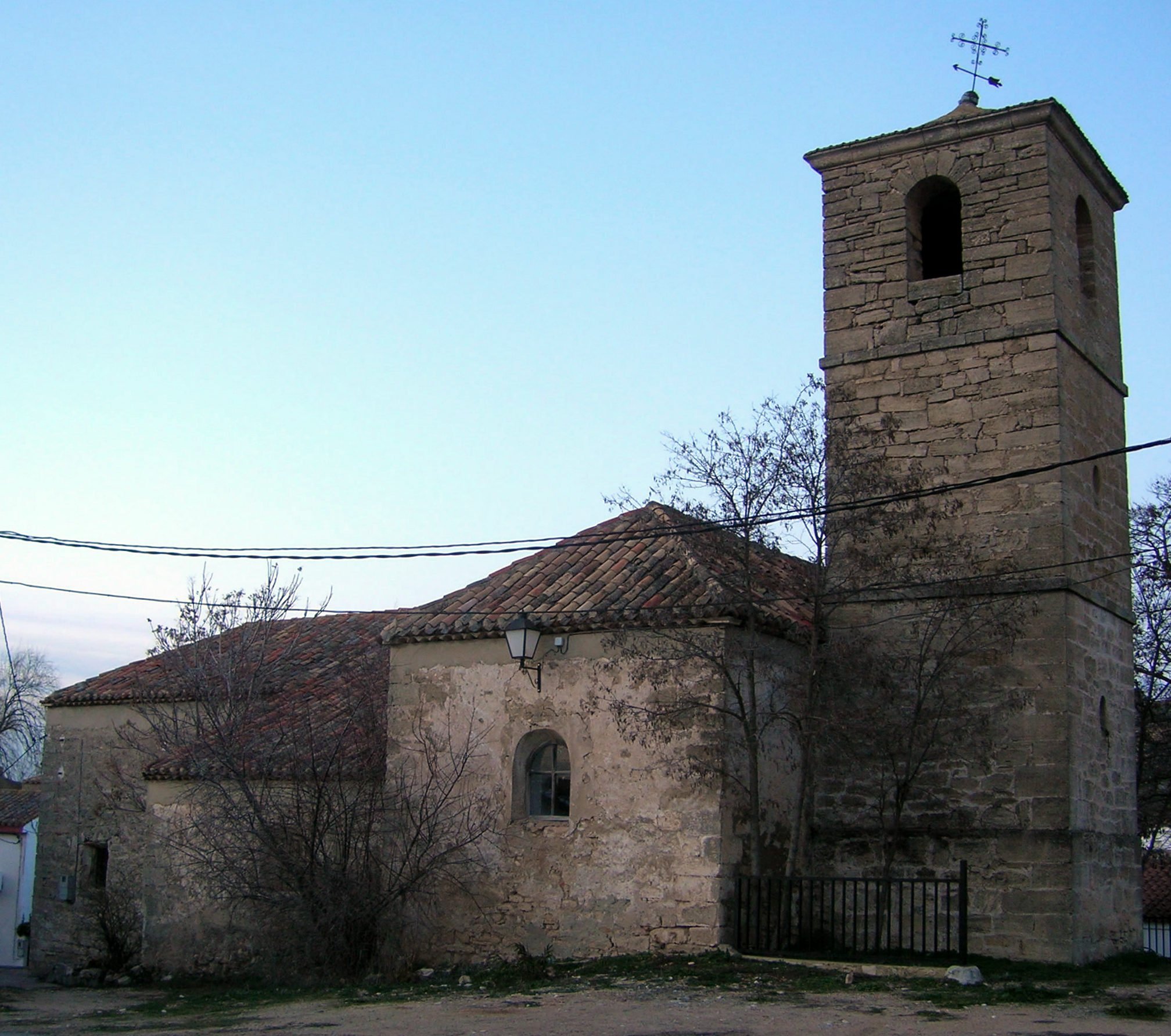

Masegoso is a small village in Albacete, Castile-La Mancha, Spain. It has a population of around 115. It is located 60 km from the provincial capital. In Masegoso, there are many natural spaces such as Los Ojos de la Laguna del Arquillo, declared a Natural Monument, and the Alcaraz Greenway.
