= Munera =

- Municipality
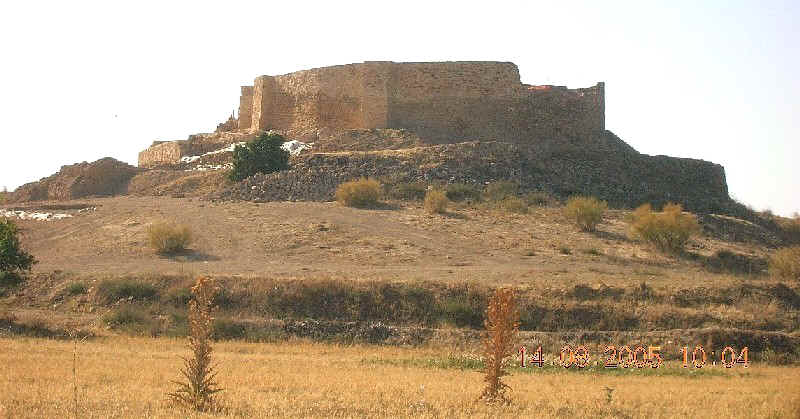
- Casares Castle in Munera

- Coat of arms

- Location of Munera Munera (Spain)
- Coordinates: 39°02′N 2°28′W
- Country: Spain
- Autonomous community: Castile-La Mancha
- Province: Albacete
- Comarca: Campo de Montiel

Government
  - Mayor: Desiderio Martínez (PSOE)

Area
  - Total: 230.54 km^{2} (89.01 sq mi)

Population (2024)
  - Total: 3,409
  - Density: 14.79/km^{2} (38.30/sq mi)
- Time zone: UTC+1 (CET)
  - Summer (DST): UTC+2 (CEST)
- Postal code: 02612
- Website: www.munera.es

Munera is a town and municipality in the province of Albacete, Spain; part of the autonomous community of Castile-La Mancha.
