= Pozo Cañada =

- Municipality
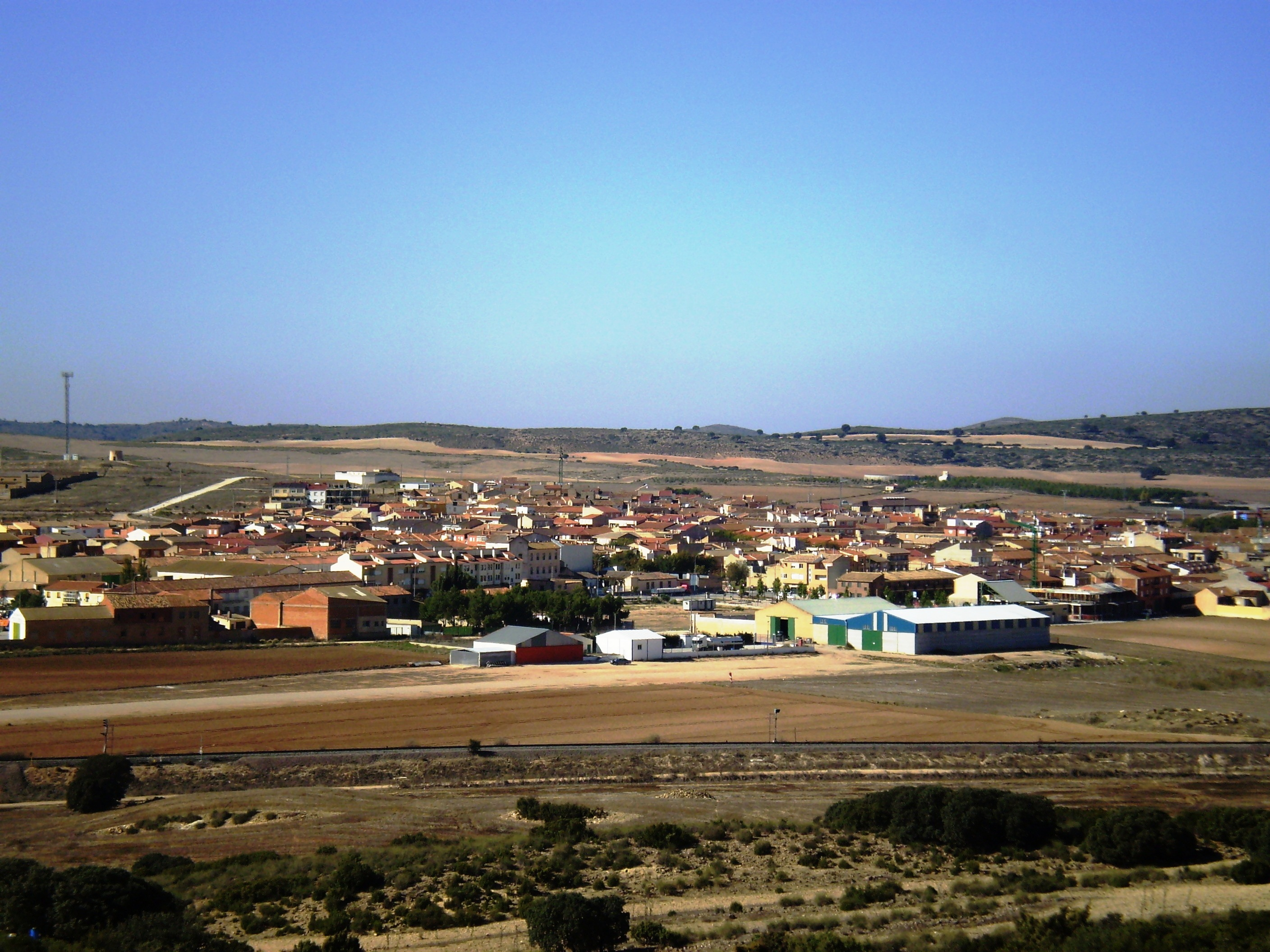
- View of Pozo Cañada.

- Flag Coat of arms

- Location of Pozo Cañada. Pozo Cañada (Castilla-La Mancha)
- Coordinates: 38°55′0″N 1°43′0″W
- Country: Spain
- Community: Castilla-La Mancha
- Province: Albacete

Government
  - Mayor: Francisco García Alcaraz

Area
  - Total: 116.83 km^{2} (45.11 sq mi)

Population (2023)
  - Total: 2,703
  - Density: 23.14/km^{2} (59.92/sq mi)
- Time zone: UTC+1 (CET)
  - Summer (DST): UTC+2 (CEST)
- Postal code: 02510
- Website: xn--pozocaada-q6a.es

Pozo Cañada is a municipality in Albacete, Castile-La Mancha, Spain. It has a population of 2,703 as of 2023.
