= Vianos =

Coordinates: 38°38′N 2°30′W

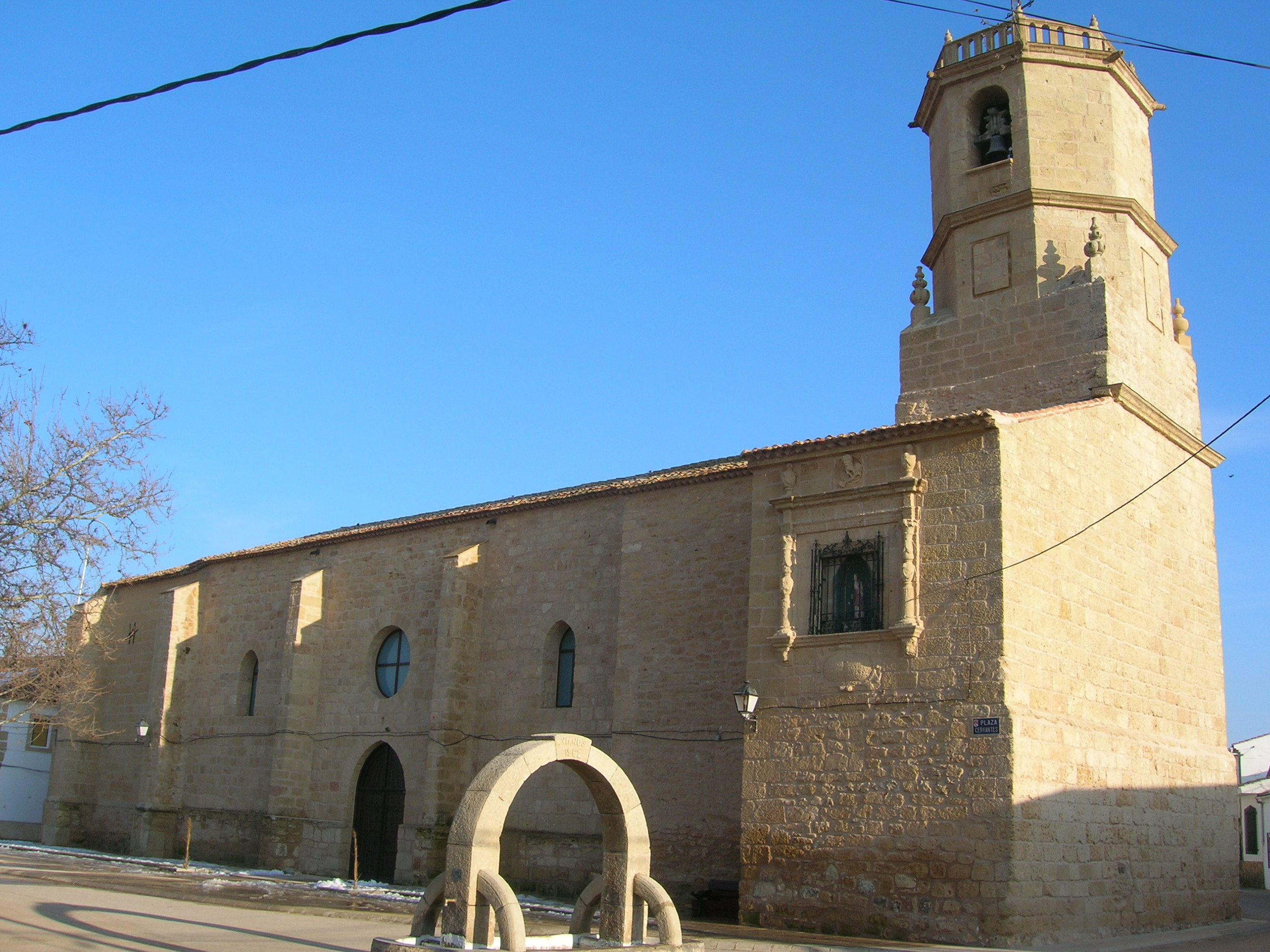
San Sebastián Church (Vianos)

Vianos is a Spanish municipality situated in Albacete, inside Castile-La Mancha. It is situated around 89 kilometres away from the city of Albacete. According to the National Statistics Institute, it has a population of 322 in 2010. It is integrated inside the natural park of "Los calares del río Mundo y de la Sima", being the municipality with the biggest area and having a great botanical variety.
