= Peñascosa =

- Municipality
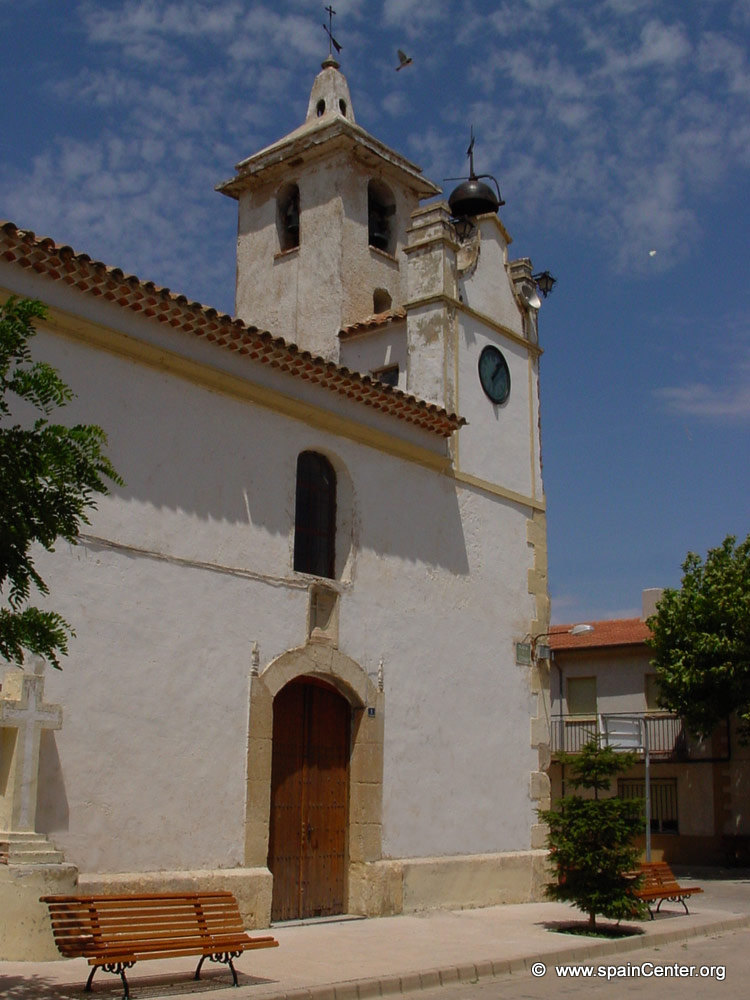
- A church in Peñascosa.

- Coat of arms

- Location of Peñascosa. Peñascosa (Castilla-La Mancha)
- Coordinates: 38°40′N 2°24′W
- Country: Spain
- Community: Castilla-La Mancha
- Province: Albacete

Government
  - Mayor: Pedro Rodríguez Córcoles (IU-Ganemos)

Area
  - Total: 189.26 km^{2} (73.07 sq mi)

Population (2023)
  - Total: 329
  - Density: 1.74/km^{2} (4.50/sq mi)
- Time zone: UTC+1 (CET)
  - Summer (DST): UTC+2 (CEST)
- Postal code: 02313

Peñascosa is a municipality in Albacete, Castile-La Mancha, Spain. It has a population of 329 as of 2023.
