= Bienservida =

Coordinates: 38°31′N 2°36′W

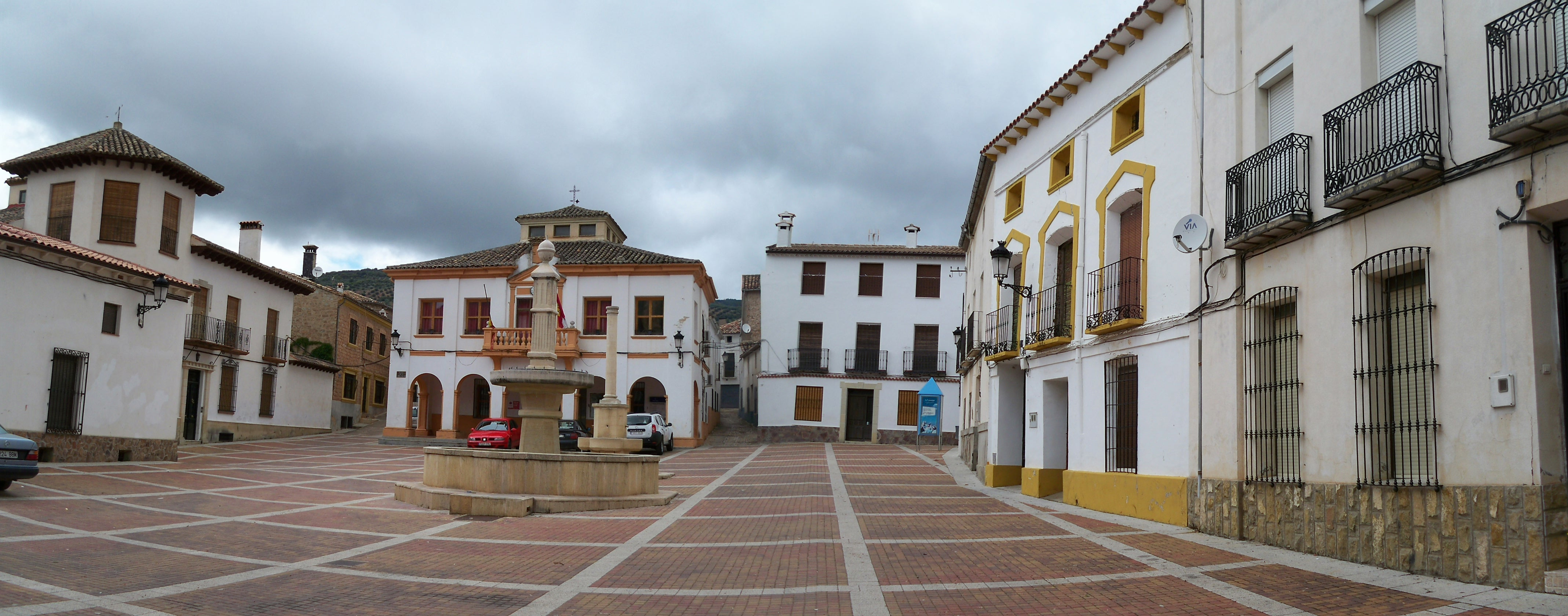

Coat of arms of Bienservida

Bienservida is a municipality in the Province of Albacete, Castile-La Mancha, Spain. It has a population of 567 as of 2023.
