= Salobre =

Town and municipality in Albacete, Spain

Coordinates: 38°36′N 2°33′W

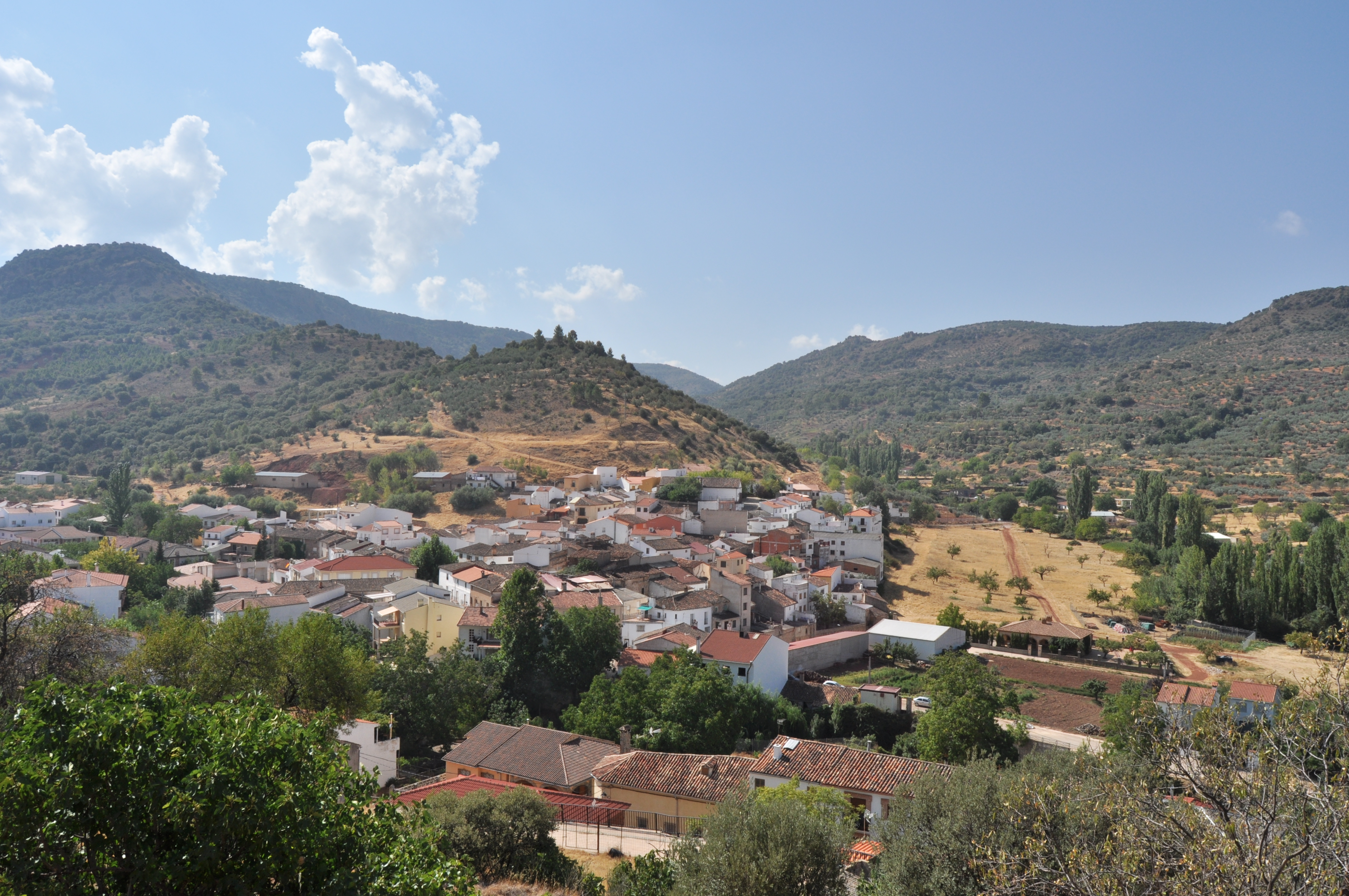
Panoramic view of Salobre

Flag of Salobre

Coat of arms of Salobre

Salobre is a town and municipality in the province of Albacete, Spain. It also contains the small village of Reolid.

In 2017, the municipality had a population of 523 inhabitants, according to statistics released by the National Statistics Institute of Spain. The inhabitants are distributed between the village of Reolid, with 173 inhabitants, and the town of Salobre, with 350 inhabitants.
