= Casas de Lázaro =

Municipality in Castile-La Mancha, Spain

- Municipality
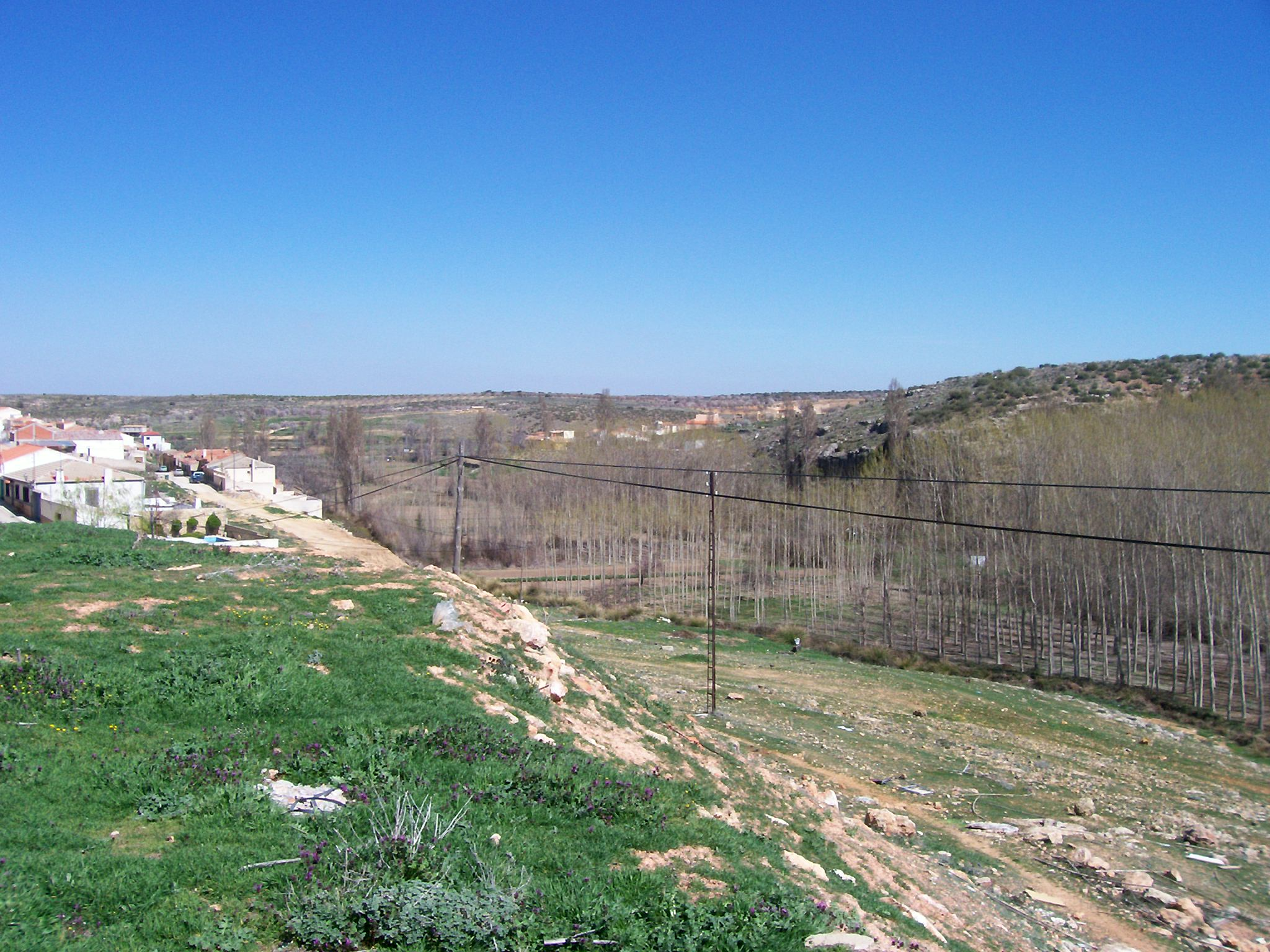
- Plains of Casas de Lázaro.

- Coat of arms

- Location of Casas de Lázaro. Casas de Lázaro (Castilla-La Mancha)
- Coordinates: 38°46′N 2°14′W
- Country: Spain
- Community: Castilla-La Mancha
- Province: Albacete

Government
  - Mayor: Eugenia Cuartero Garrido (Ind.)

Area
  - Total: 112.32 km^{2} (43.37 sq mi)

Population (2023)
  - Total: 324
  - Density: 2.88/km^{2} (7.47/sq mi)
- Time zone: UTC+1 (CET)
  - Summer (DST): UTC+2 (CEST)
- Postal code: 02329
- Website: www.casasdelazaro.es

Casas de Lázaro is a municipality in Albacete, Castile-La Mancha, Spain. It has a population of 324.
