= Casas de Ves =

- Municipality
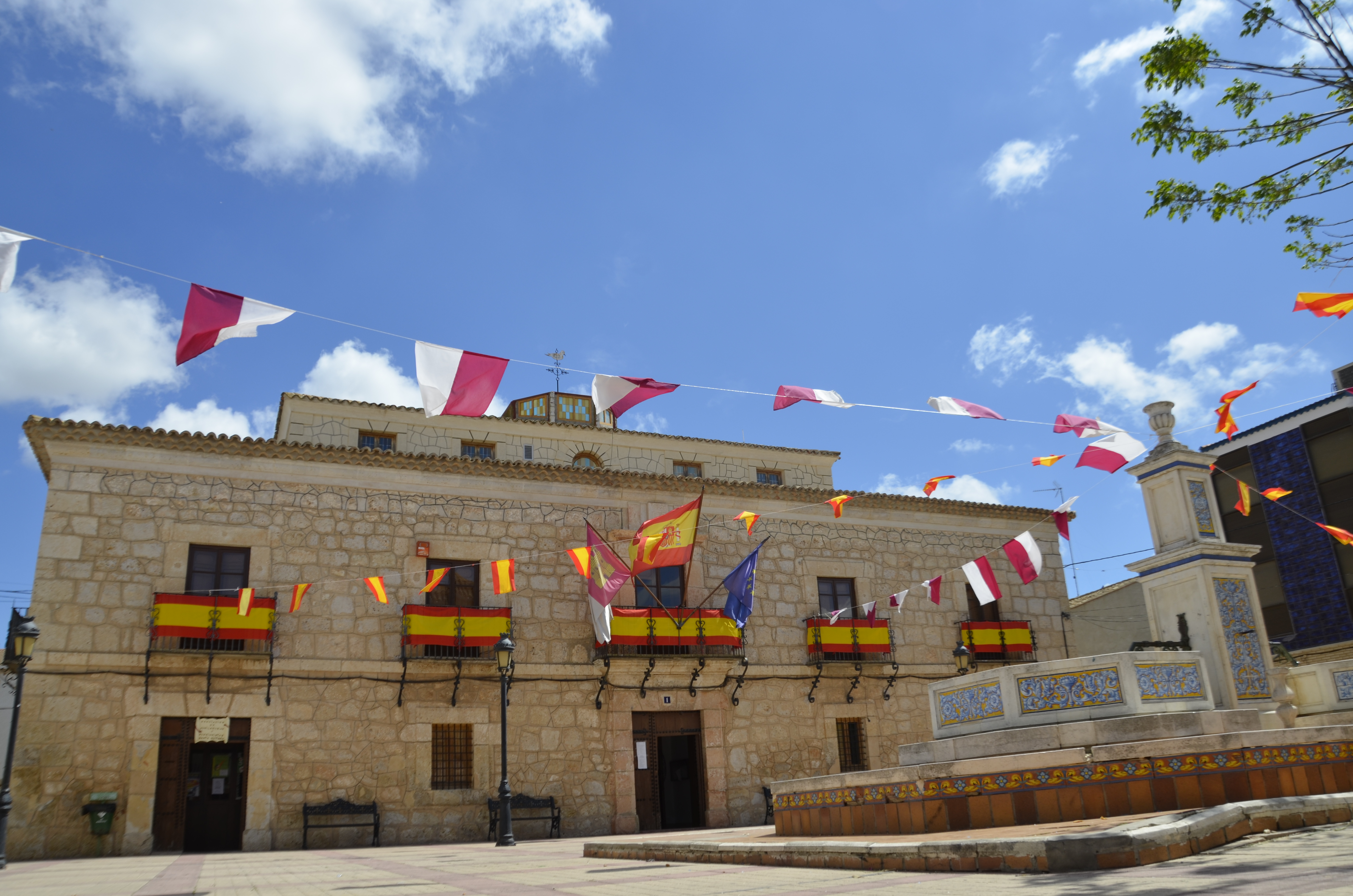
- Town hall

- Coat of arms

- Location of Casas de Ves. Casas de Ves (Castilla-La Mancha)
- Coordinates: 39°15′N 1°20′W
- Country: Spain
- Community: Castilla-La Mancha
- Province: Albacete

Government
  - Mayor: Marisa Martínez Gómez

Area
  - Total: 125.41 km^{2} (48.42 sq mi)

Population (2023)
  - Total: 556
  - Density: 4.43/km^{2} (11.5/sq mi)
- Time zone: UTC+1 (CET)
  - Summer (DST): UTC+2 (CEST)
- Postal code: 02212
- Website: www.casasdeves.es

Casas de Ves is a municipality in Albacete, Castile-La Mancha, Spain. It has a population of 556.
