= Cotillas =

- Municipality
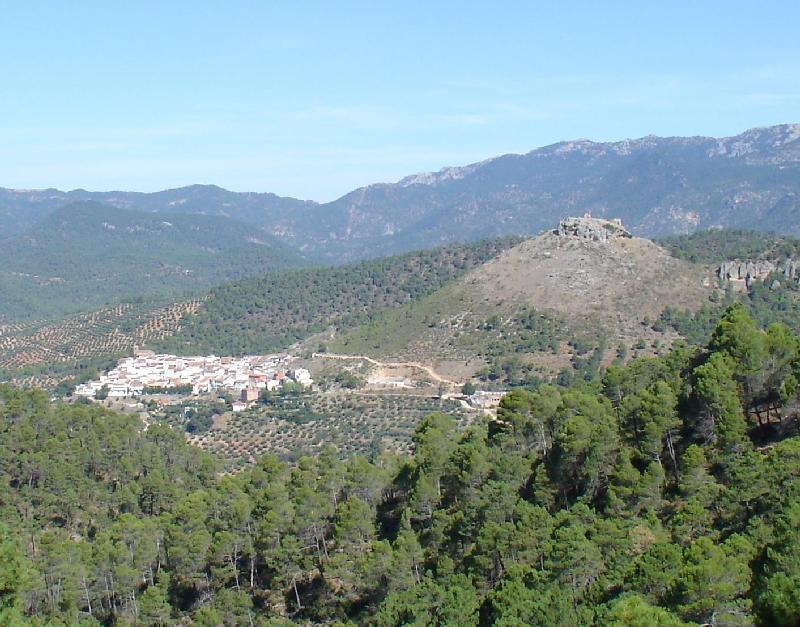
- An overview of Cotillas.

- Coat of arms

- Location of Cotillas. Cotillas (Castilla-La Mancha)
- Coordinates: 38°26′N 2°30′W
- Country: Spain
- Community: Castilla-La Mancha
- Province: Albacete

Government
  - Mayor: Francisco Zamora López (PSOE)

Area
  - Total: 14.47 km^{2} (5.59 sq mi)

Population (2023)
  - Total: 131
  - Density: 9.05/km^{2} (23.4/sq mi)
- Time zone: UTC+1 (CET)
  - Summer (DST): UTC+2 (CEST)
- Postal code: 02461

Cotillas is a municipality in Albacete, Castile-La Mancha, Spain. It has a population of 131.
