= Pozohondo =

- Municipality
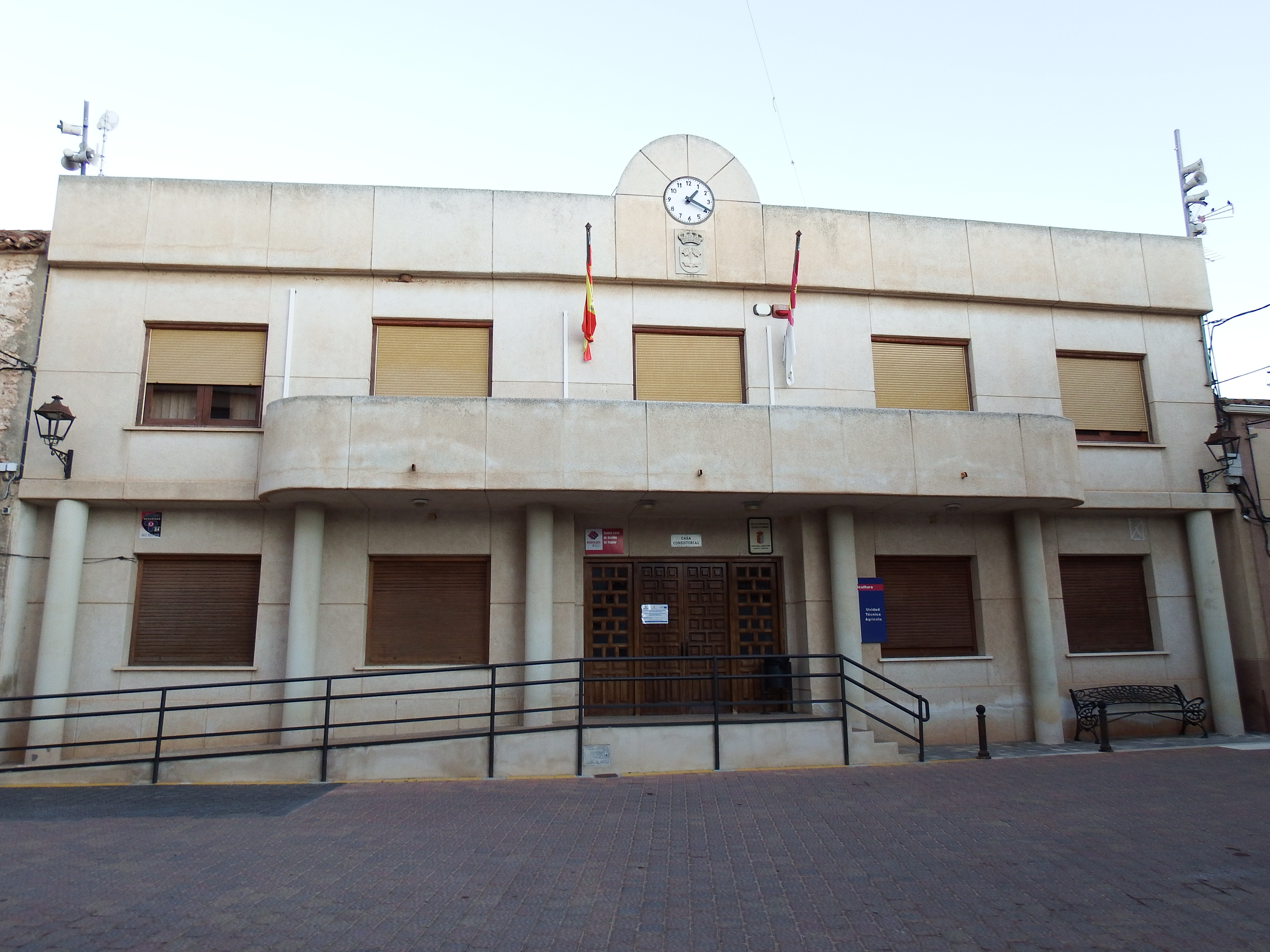
- The town hall of Pozohondo.

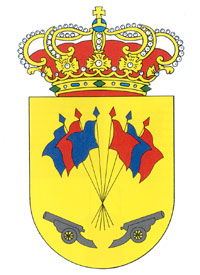
- Coat of arms

- Location of Pozohondo. Pozohondo (Castilla-La Mancha)
- Coordinates: 38°43′N 1°55′W
- Country: Spain
- Community: Castilla-La Mancha
- Province: Albacete

Government
  - Mayor: Julia Sánchez Gómez (PSOE)

Area
  - Total: 136.42 km^{2} (52.67 sq mi)

Population (2023)
  - Total: 1,551
  - Density: 11.37/km^{2} (29.45/sq mi)
- Time zone: UTC+1 (CET)
  - Summer (DST): UTC+2 (CEST)
- Postal code: 02141
- Website: www.pozohondo.es

Pozohondo is a municipality in Albacete, Castile-La Mancha, Spain. It has a population of 1,551 as of 2023. It is located just about 30 minutes from the city of Albacete.
