= Jorquera =

- municipality
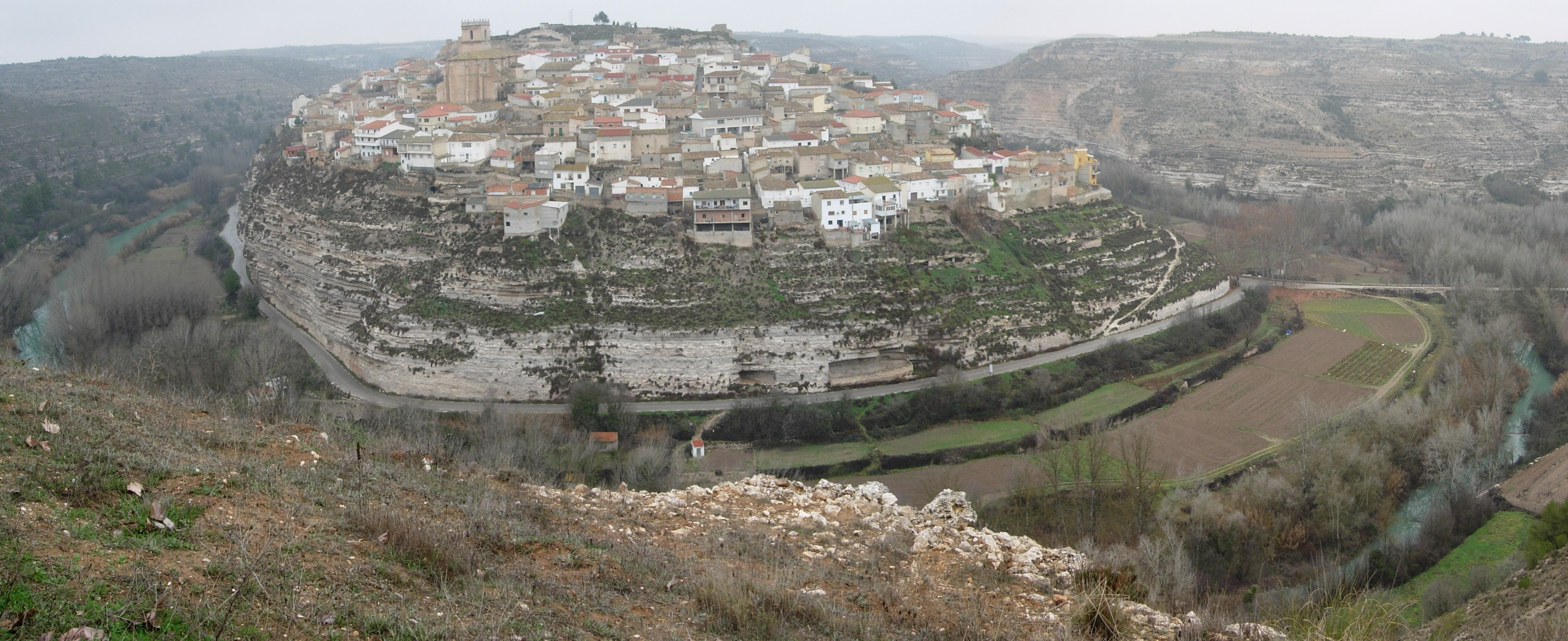

- Flag Coat of arms

- Location in Spain.
- Coordinates: 39°10′N 1°31′W
- Country: Spain
- Autonomous community: Castilla-La Mancha
- Province: Albacete

Government
  - Mayor: Jesús María Jiménez Sánchez

Area
  - Total: 67.97 km^{2} (26.24 sq mi)
- Elevation: 682 m (2,238 ft)

Population (2025-01-01)
  - Total: 356
  - Density: 5.24/km^{2} (13.6/sq mi)
- Demonym: Jorqueranos
- Time zone: UTC+1 (CET)
  - Summer (DST): UTC+2 (CEST)

Jorquera is a municipality in the province of Albacete, Castile-La Mancha, Spain. It has a population of 529.

It is located on a spur sided by the Júcar river. The upper side of the hill is sided by 12th century walls built by the Almohads.
