= Hoya-Gonzalo =

Coordinates: 38°57′N 1°33′W

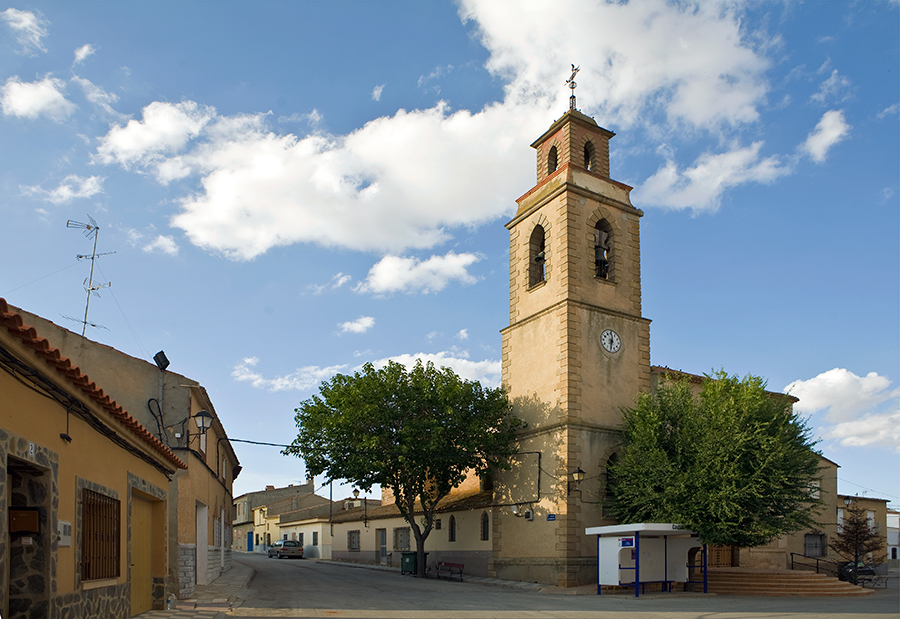
View of the church square of Hoya Gonzalo

Coat of arms of Hoya-Gonzalo

Hoya-Gonzalo is a municipality in Albacete, Castile-La Mancha, Spain. It has a population of 768.
