= Corral-Rubio =

Municipality in Castile-La Mancha, Spain

- Municipality
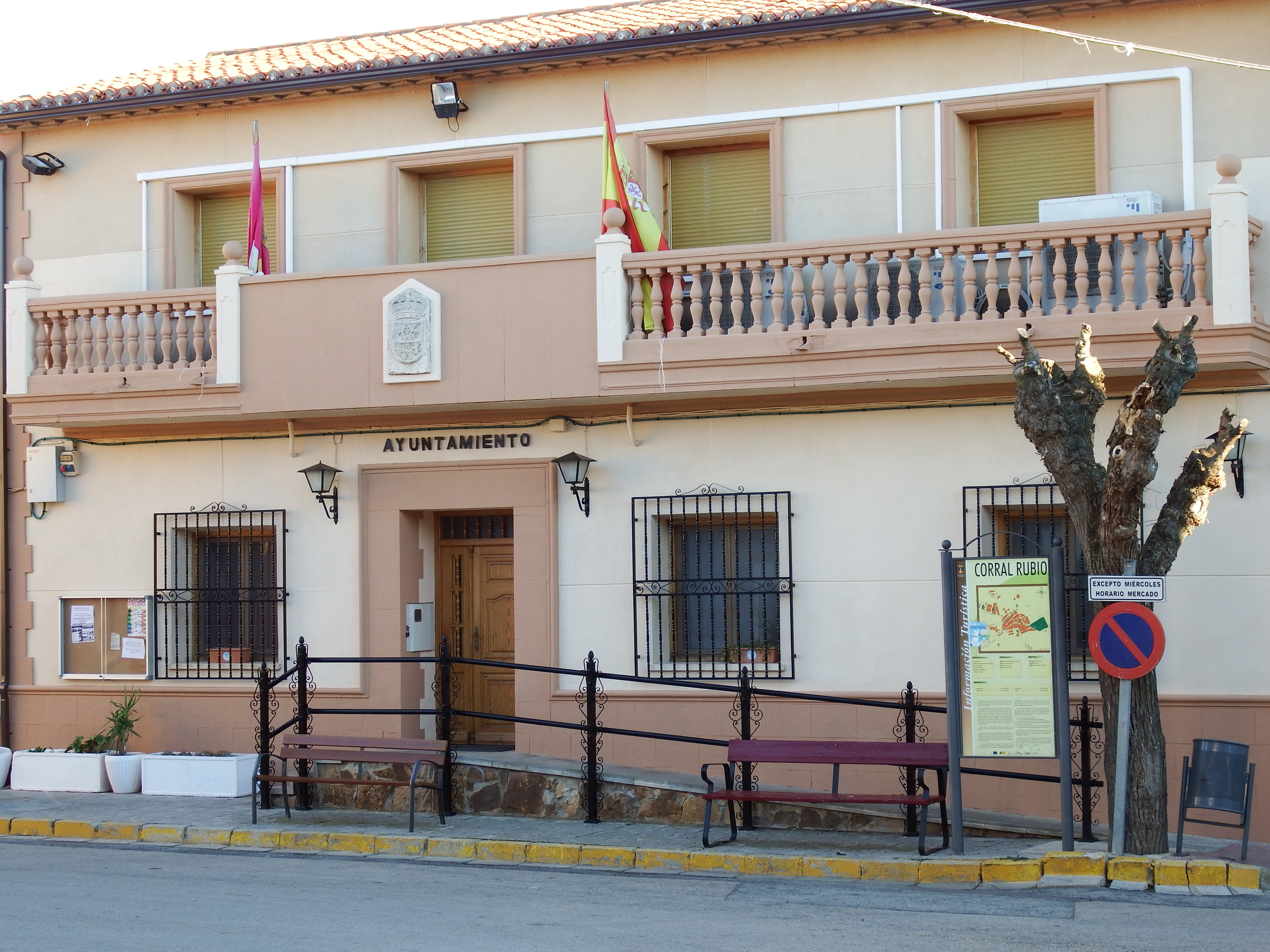
- The town hall of Corral-Rubio.

- Coat of arms

- Location of Corral-Rubio. Corral-Rubio (Castilla-La Mancha)
- Coordinates: 38°50′N 1°27′W
- Country: Spain
- Community: Castilla-La Mancha
- Province: Albacete

Government
  - Mayor: Eugenio Farías Alcantud (PP)

Area
  - Total: 94.76 km^{2} (36.59 sq mi)

Population (2023)
  - Total: 302
  - Density: 3.19/km^{2} (8.25/sq mi)
- Time zone: UTC+1 (CET)
  - Summer (DST): UTC+2 (CEST)
- Postal code: 02693
- Website: corralrubio.es

Corral-Rubio is a municipality in Albacete, Castile-La Mancha, Spain. It has a population of 302 as of 2023.Corral-Rubio is located 39.02 km (24.2 mi) away from the centre of Albacete.
