= Nerpio =

Municipality in Castilla–La Mancha, Spain

Coordinates: 38°09′N 2°18′W

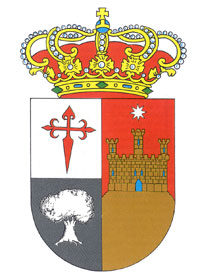
Nerpio's coat of arms

Nerpio is a municipality in Albacete, Castile-La Mancha, Spain. It has a population of 1,692.
