= Campo de Montiel (Albacete) =

Campo de Montiel (Albacete) is a comarca of the Province of Albacete, Spain.
