= Pétrola =

- Municipality
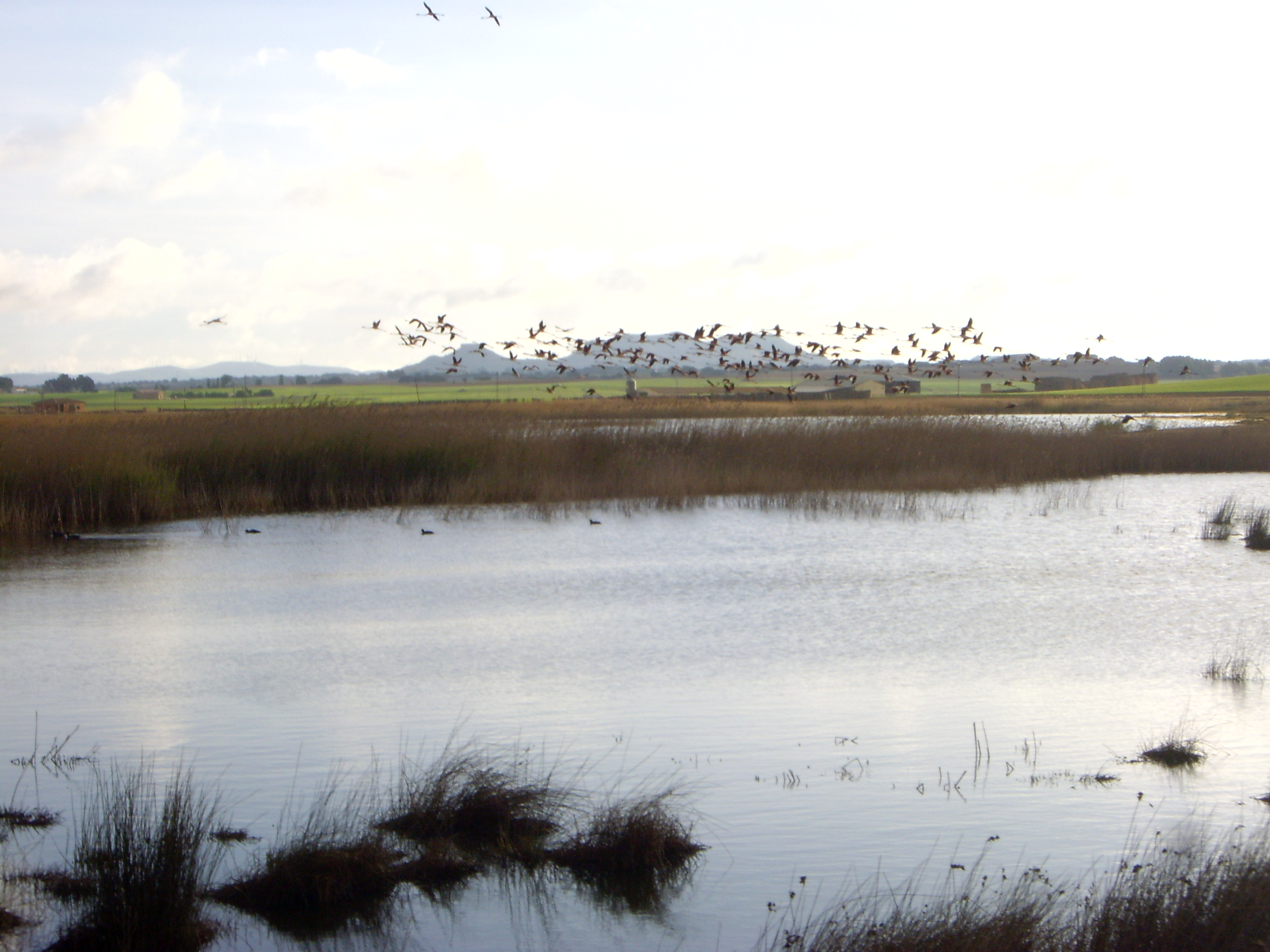
- The salt walter lagoon of Pétrola.

- Location of Pétrola. Pétrola (Castilla-La Mancha)
- Coordinates: 38°49′N 1°33′W
- Country: Spain
- Community: Castilla-La Mancha
- Province: Albacete

Government
  - Mayor: Enriqueta Hoyos Cantos (PP)

Area
  - Total: 74.61 km^{2} (28.81 sq mi)

Population (2023)
  - Total: 669
  - Density: 8.97/km^{2} (23.2/sq mi)
- Time zone: UTC+1 (CET)
  - Summer (DST): UTC+2 (CEST)
- Postal code: 02692
- Website: petrola.es

Pétrola is a municipality in Albacete, Castile-La Mancha, Spain. It is 35 km from Albacete, capital of the province. The town's name comes from the ancient Roman word "petra", meaning 'stone'.

== Environment ==
Pétrola is located in a fertile valley watered by cascades and small rivers. It is famous because of its salt water lagoon, which is located in a nature reserve.

== Demographics ==
It has a population of 669 people. In the summertime, its population increases to nearly 2,000 people due to the tourists, most of them sons of the people that emigrate.

== Economy ==
The economy is mainly based in agriculture (cereals and vines) and farming and have lambs and sheep mainly.

== Politics ==
The current mayor of the town is Enriqueta Hoyos Cantos, who is a member of the PP.
