= Robledo, Spain =

Robledo
- Municipality
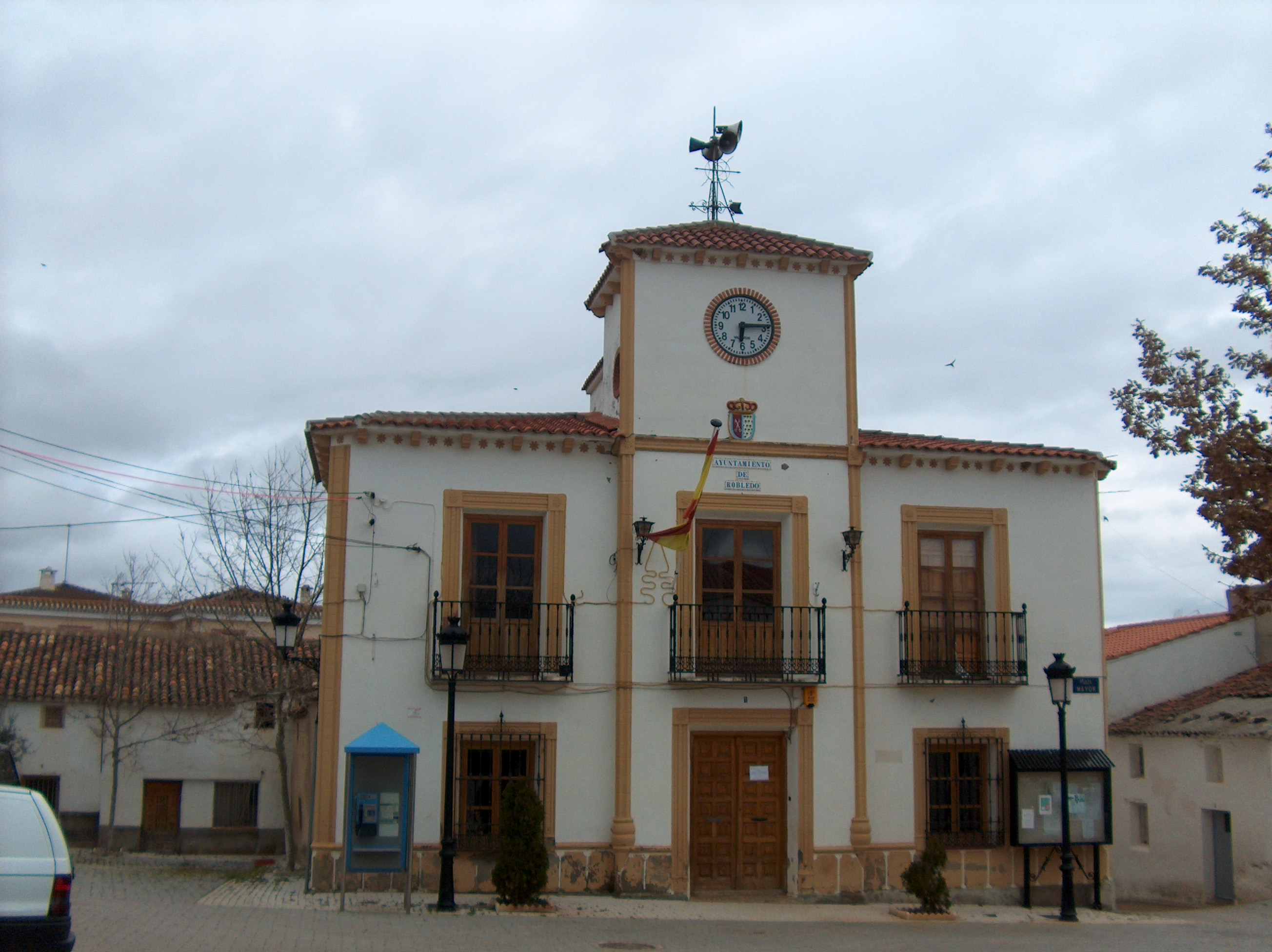
- The town hall of Robledo.

- Coat of arms

- Location of Robledo. Robledo (Castilla-La Mancha)
- Coordinates: 39°07′N 2°00′W
- Country: Spain
- Community: Castilla-La Mancha
- Province: Albacete

Government
  - Mayor: Cristian Cuerda González

Area
  - Total: 120.08 km^{2} (46.36 sq mi)

Population (2023)
  - Total: 394
  - Density: 3.28/km^{2} (8.50/sq mi)
- Time zone: UTC+1 (CET)
  - Summer (DST): UTC+2 (CEST)
- Postal code: 02340
- Website: www.robledo.es

Robledo is a municipality in Albacete, Castile-La Mancha, Spain. It has a population of 394 as of 2023.
