= Férez =

Spanish commune

Coordinates: 38°21′N 2°00′W

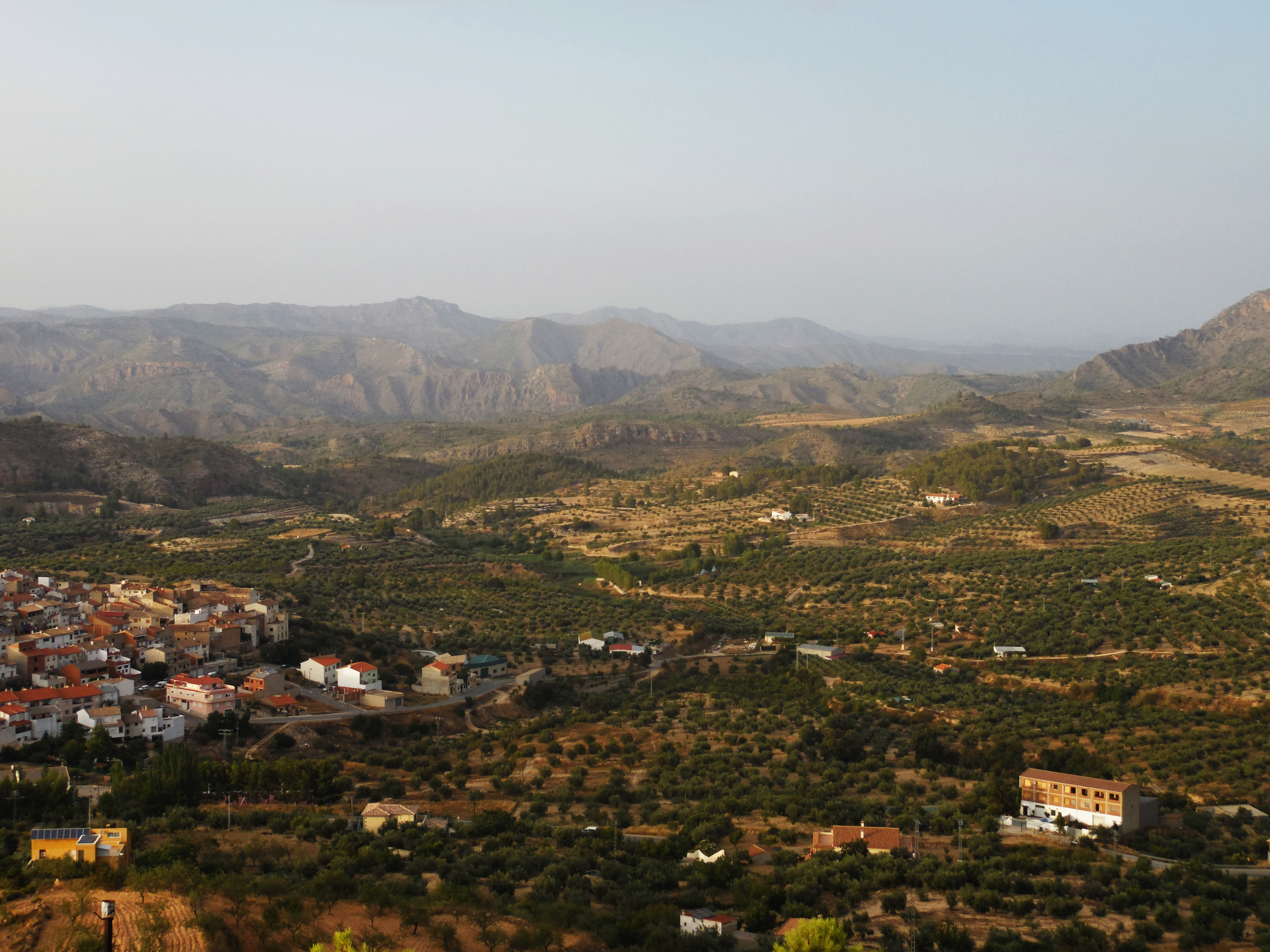
Férez (left of the picture) and surroundings

Coat of arms of Férez

Férez is a municipality in Albacete, Castile-La Mancha, Spain. It has a population of 617 as of 2023.
