= Montalvos =

- Municipality
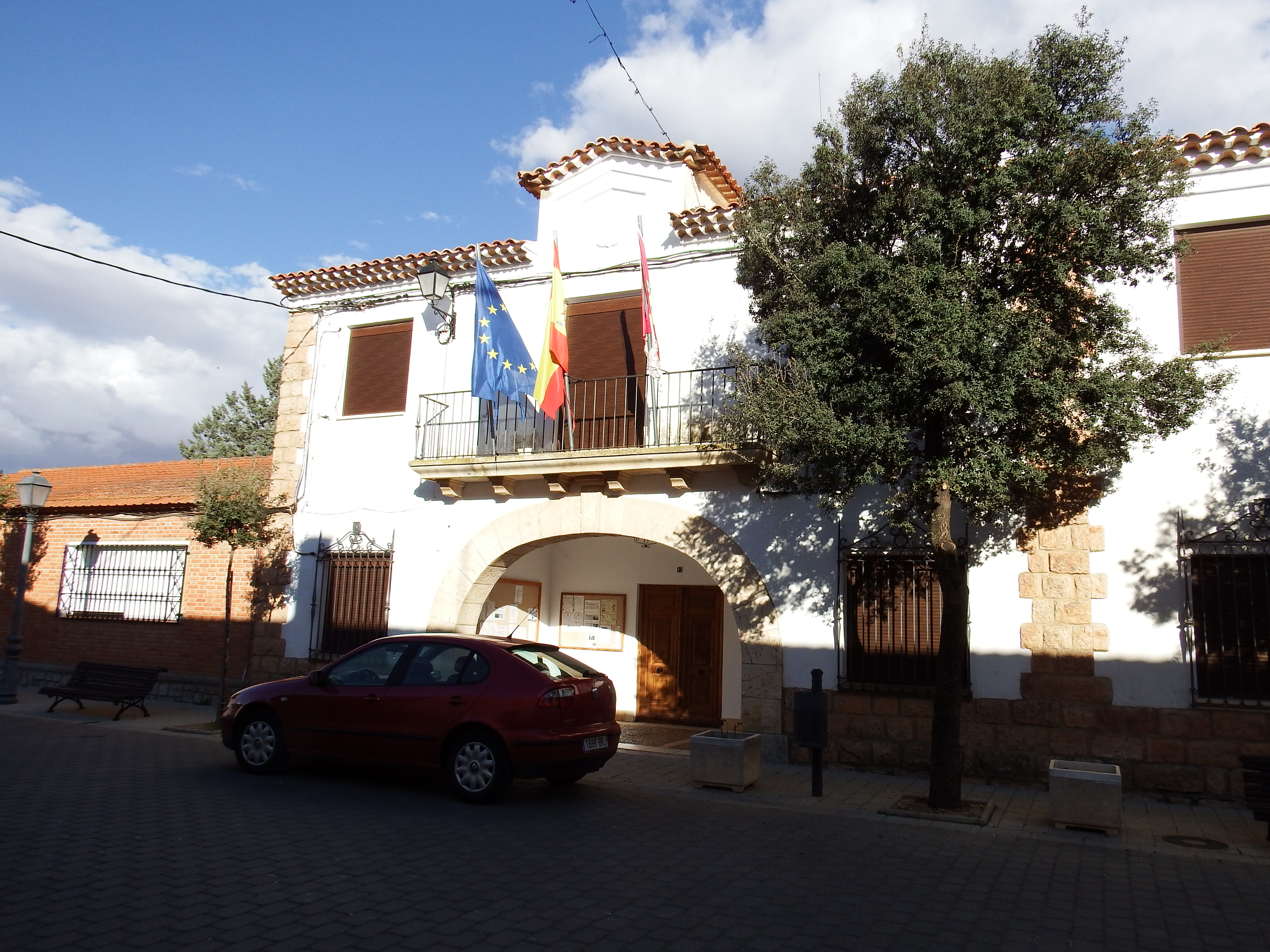
- The town hall of Montalvos.

- Coat of arms

- Location of Montalvos. Montalvos (Castilla-La Mancha)
- Coordinates: 39°10′N 2°01′W
- Country: Spain
- Community: Castilla-La Mancha
- Province: Albacete

Government
  - Mayor: José Angel Fragoso Motos (PP)

Area
  - Total: 24.66 km^{2} (9.52 sq mi)

Population (2023)
  - Total: 89
  - Density: 3.6/km^{2} (9.3/sq mi)
- Time zone: UTC+1 (CET)
  - Summer (DST): UTC+2 (CEST)
- Postal code: 02638
- Website: www.montalvos.es

Montalvos is a municipality in Albacete, Castile-La Mancha, Spain. It has a population of 89.
