= Peñas de San Pedro =

Municipality of Spain

Coordinates: 38°44′N 2°00′W

Peñas de San Pedro is a municipality in Albacete, Castile-La Mancha, Spain.

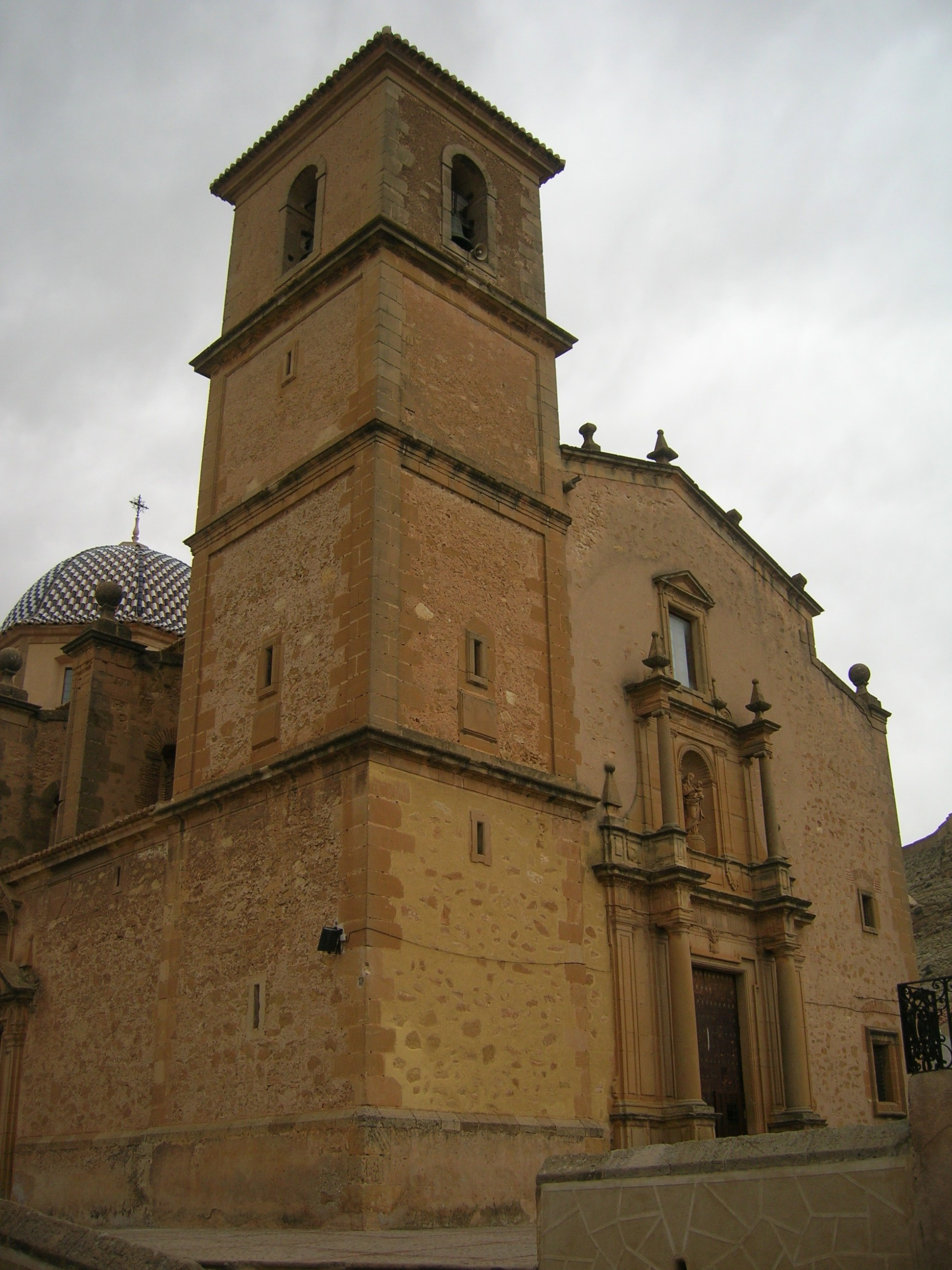
Peñas de San Pedro

Coat of arms of Peñas de San Pedro

Peñas de San Pedro is 66.41 sq miles (172 km^{2}) located south of CM-313 and west of CM-3203. It has a population of 1,405 (2014). It has an average altitude of 1.015 meters or 0.0006 miles above sea level.

It was once home to the Castle of San Pedro Peñas, which is now demolished. Many people considered the castle to be very strong and impenetrable.

The area is very religious, with a parish church honoring Lady of La Esperanza as well as a temple in baroque style. The settlement is also home to the sanctuary of Christ Crucified Sahuco.
