= Villalgordo del Júcar =

Coordinates: 39°18′N 2°04′W

Villalgordo del Júcar is a municipality in Albacete, Castile-La Mancha, Spain. It has a population of 1,275. Palacio de los Gosálvez was built in 1902 by Enrique Gosálvez.
