= Fuensanta, Spain =

Fuensanta
- Municipality
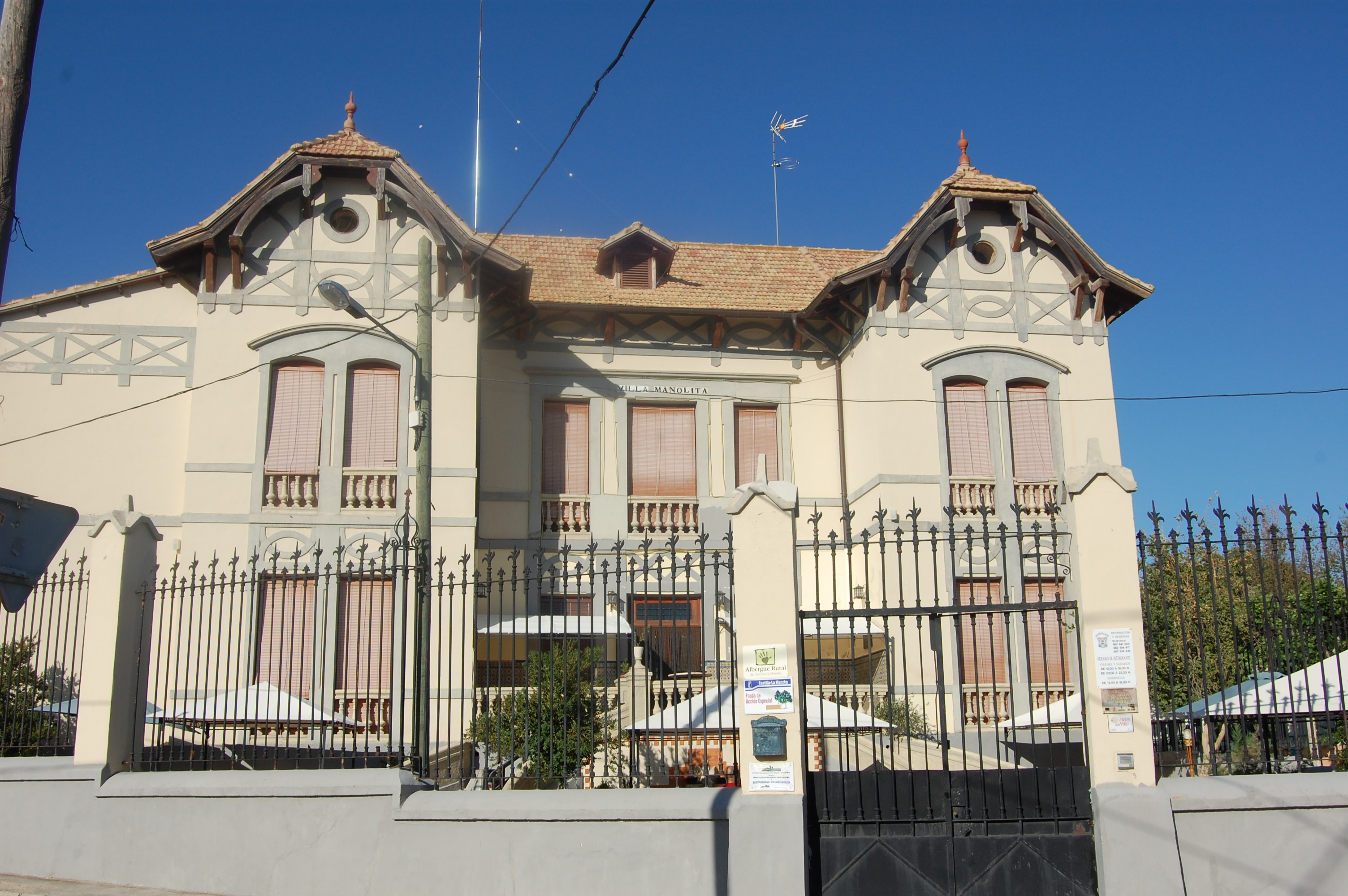
- Villa Manolita

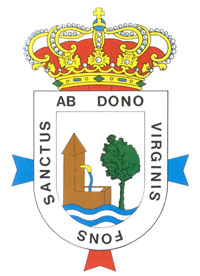
- Coat of arms

- Location within Spain
- Coordinates: 39°14′42.4″N 2°04′08.0″W
- Country: Spain
- A. community: Castilla-La Mancha
- Province: Albacete

Government
  - Mayor: José Manuel Núñez

Area
  - Total: 23.96 km^{2} (9.25 sq mi)

Population (January 1, 2021)
  - Total: 284
  - Density: 11.85/km^{2} (30.7/sq mi)
- Time zone: UTC+01:00
- Postal code(s): 02637
- MCN: 02032
- Website: Official website

Fuensanta is a municipality located to the north of the province of Albacete. This province belongs to the Independent Community of Castilla-La Mancha (Spain). The locality is in the Federeation of La Mancha del Júcar-Centro. The municipality has 366 inhabitants, is 36 km. from the provincial capital, and occupies an area of 23,96 km^{2}.

== History ==
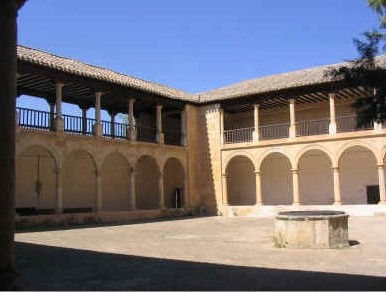
Cloister of the Trinitario convent located in Fuensanta.

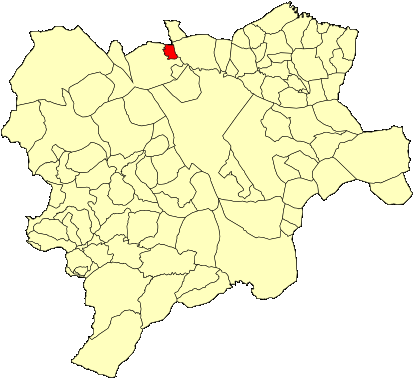

After a supposed Consecrated virgin's appearance in 1482 that gave rise to the birth of a spring, a small hermitage was based here that belonged to the population of La Roda. Towards 1561 the Trinitaria Order was able to buy the hermitage to build a monastery, after a long conflict with the parish of La Roda.

With time the people of the environs began to go to receive baths in the holy spring, and the maiden went away, creating a small village that would give rise to the birth of the municipality. In 1579 it had 20 people.

In 1671 the population already had 40 people, due to the segregation of La Roda and its constitution in an independent town after the payment of 337,500 maravedíes to the king. The Stem initiated a lawsuit against this decision that ended the confirmation of the segregation of the Fuen Santa in 1672.

With the confiscation of the goods of the Church at the beginning of the 19th century, the Monastery of the Trinitarios was abandoned, with time becoming the property of the City council, while its temple will become the local parish, replacing the old one.

== Monuments ==
In the locality of Fuensanta is a parish, the old convent of Trinitarios friars, in whom it venerates Our Lady of the Remedies of Fuensanta. At the moment the temple is formed by two parts, the temple and the cloister.

The temple is formed by a rectangular square covered with vaults. The top supports a dome which is adorned with medallions of Trinitarios saints in plaster relief. The entry room of the temple is covered by a dome with pictorial decorations. The outside is of simple construction, of baroque style.

The cloister of the temple was constructed in the 16th century, and is composed of an ample space squared with double porticada galleries; arches with columns that maintain the thresholds of corridors.

In the old orchards of the convent, a small chapel is conserved with great devotion from the population since it was in the spring where the appearance of the Virgin occurred.

Another religious building of the town of Fuensanta is the old parish of San Gregorio Nacianceno, constructed in the 17th century that at the moment is a particular property turned into warehouse.

Barroca of the 18th-century style exists in the town in one old compound divided into three distinct houses, in which it emphasizes its Rococo facade and good rejería. Also a small palace exists of modernist style known as Villa Manolita or the House the Mannas that was reconstructed in 2003 to turn it into a rural shelter.

== Celebrations ==
- May 9: Day of Saint Gregory of Nazianzus
- The Saturday following San Gregorio: celebration of the Return of the Virgin of the Remedies to La Roda
- Three weeks later: celebration of the return of the Virgin to Fuensanta
- Culture week from August 9 through the 15th
- September 8: Fair of the Virgin of the Remedies
