= Manchuela =

Coordinates: 39°13′N 1°21′W

- Comarca
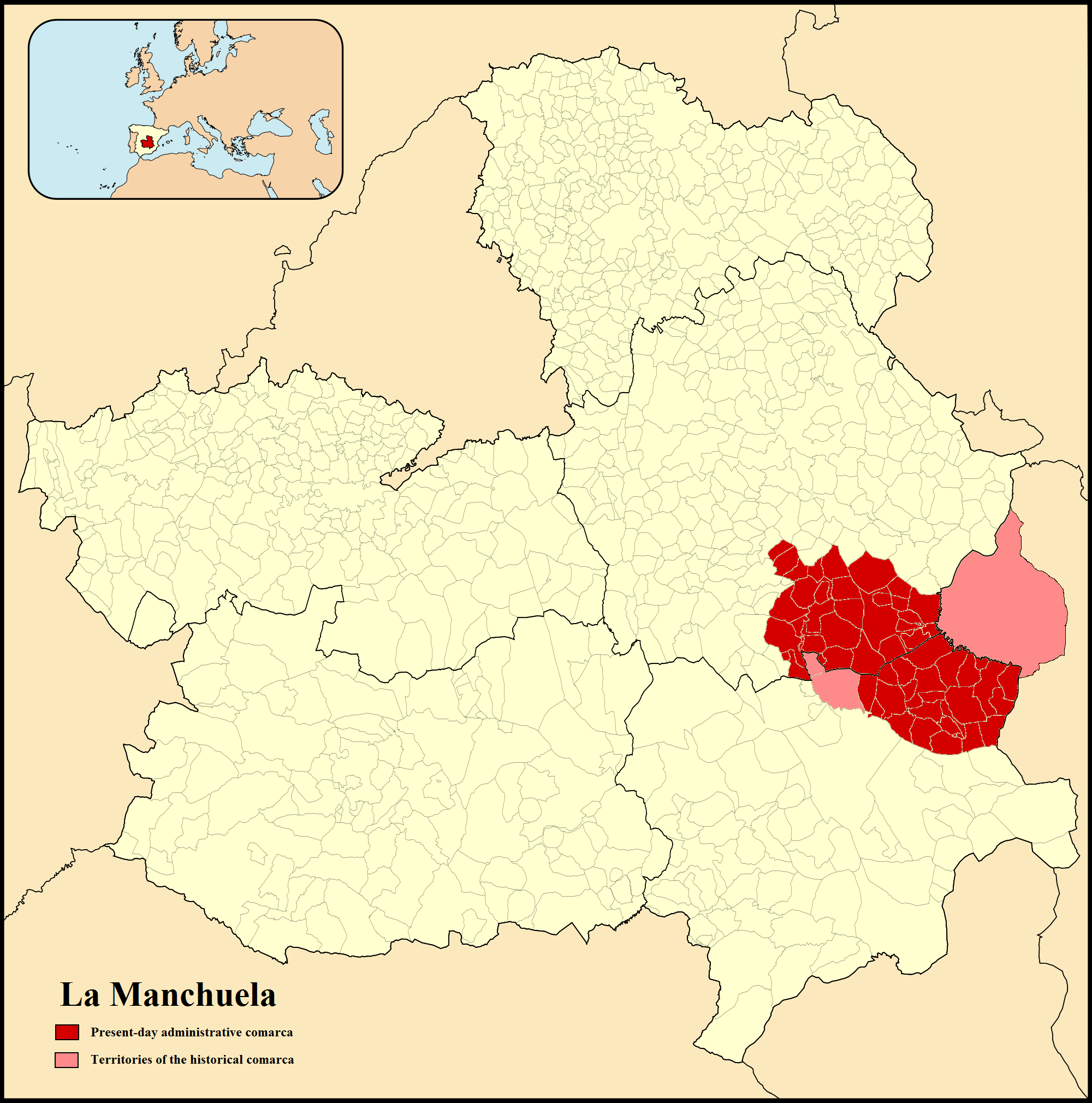
- Country: Spain
- Autonomous community: Castile-La Mancha Valencian Community
- Province: Albacete, Cuenca, Valencia
- Municipalities: List: See text

Area
  - Total: 5,658.55 km^{2} (2,184.78 sq mi)
- Elevation: 715 m (2,346 ft)

Population
  - Total: 115,674
  - Density: 20.4423/km^{2} (52.9454/sq mi)
- Time zone: UTC+1 (CET)
  - Summer (DST): UTC+2 (CEST)
- Largest municipality: Requena

Manchuela or La Manchuela ("lesser La Mancha") is a comarca located in Castile-La Mancha and Valencian Community, Spain.

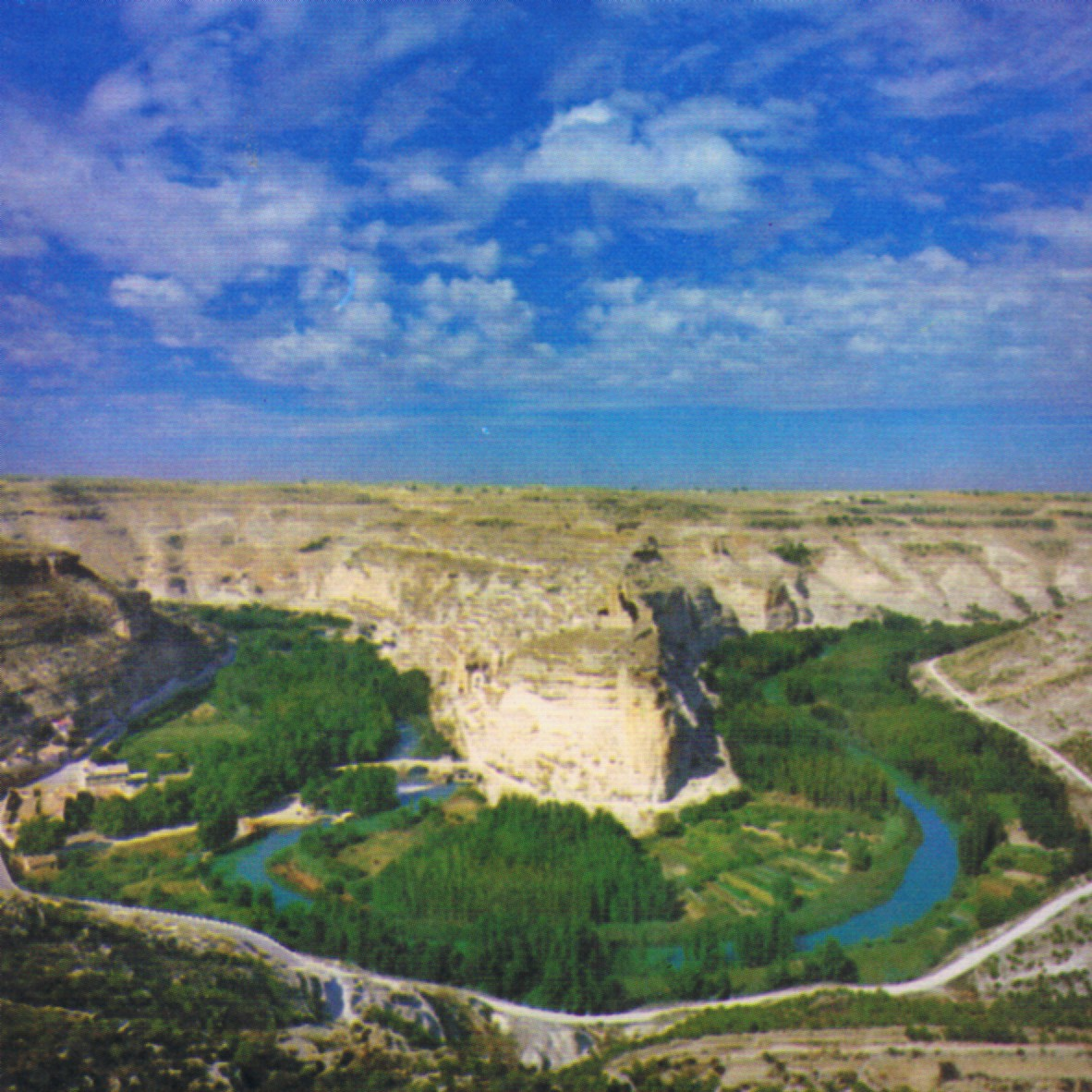
Landscape of the Júcar gorges

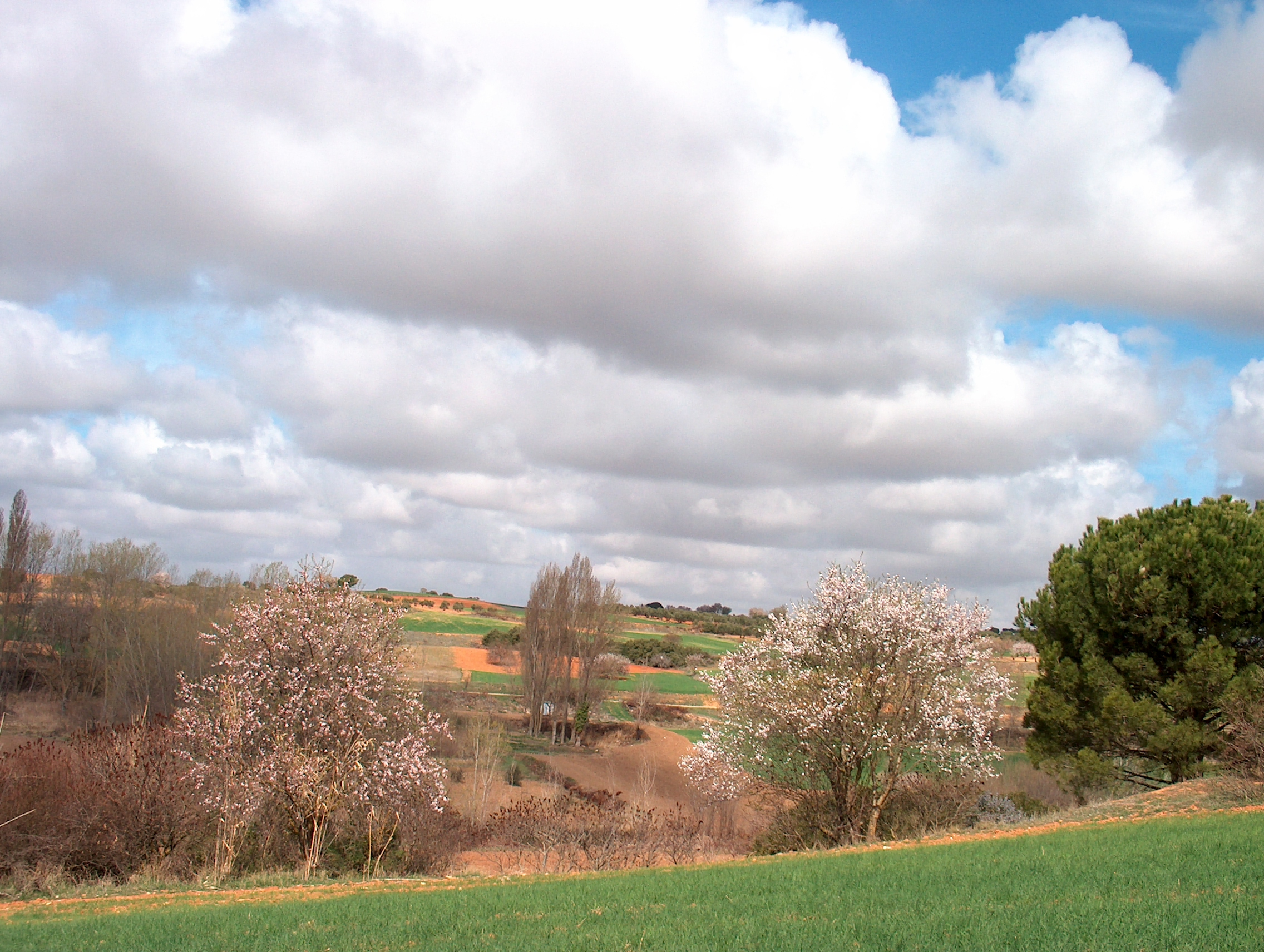
Manchuela landscape in Buenache de Alarcón

== Historical comarca ==
The historical Manchuela comarca included the municipalities of Tarazona de la Mancha and Villalgordo del Júcar, and the Requena-Utiel comarca which had been part of the Cuenca Province until 1851 and is now part of the province of Valencia, Valencian Community, except for Mira.

This comarca has been traditionally a place of wheat, olive and wine growers, along with some cattle rearing. There are two wine Designations of Origin in the comarca, Manchuela DO and Ribera del Júcar DO.

== Present-day comarca ==
The present-day Manchuela comarca is divided between Manchuela Albaceteña in Albacete Province, the Manchuela Conquense in Cuenca Province and the Valencian Manchuela (Requena-Utiel) in the Valencia Province. The Júcar River cuts across the high plateau of La Meseta forming deep gorges (Hoces del Júcar) offering spectacular landscapes. The Serranía de Cuenca forms the northern boundary of the comarca, and the Sierra de las Cabrillas the eastern. The western boundary is formed by a section of the Júcar River and the southern Almansa corridor.

== Municipal terms and villages ==
=== Albacete province ===
Abengibre, Alatoz, Alborea, Alcalá del Júcar, Balsa de Ves, Carcelén, Casas-Ibáñez, Casas de Juan Núñez, Casas de Ves, Cenizate, Fuentealbilla, Golosalvo, Jorquera, Madrigueras, Mahora, Motilleja, Navas de Jorquera, Pozo-Lorente, La Recueja, Valdeganga, Villamalea, Villatoya, Villavaliente and Villa de Ves.

=== Cuenca province ===
Alarcón, Almodóvar del Pinar, Buenache de Alarcón, Campillo de Altobuey, Casasimarro, Casas de Benítez, Casas de Guijarro, Castillejo de Iniesta, El Herrumblar, Enguídanos, Gabaldón, Graja de Iniesta, Hontecillas, Iniesta, Ledaña, Minglanilla, Motilla del Palancar, Olmedilla de Alarcón, Paracuellos, El Peral, La Pesquera, El Picazo, Pozoamargo, Pozorrubielos de la Mancha, Puebla del Salvador, Quintanar del Rey, Sisante, Tébar, Valhermoso de la Fuente, Valverdejo, Villagarcía del Llano, Villalpardo, Villanueva de la Jara and Villarta.

=== Valencia province ===
Camporrobles, Villalgordo, Fuenterrobles, Venta del Moro, Caudete de las Fuentes, Utiel, San Antonio, Requena, Sinarcas, and Chera.

== See also ==
- Manchuela DO
