= Still Life with Ghosts =

- Film poster
- Spanish: Bodegón con fantasmas
- Directed by: Enrique Buleo
- Written by: Enrique Buleo
- Produced by: Alejandra Mora; Alicia Yubero; Juan Cavestany; Álvaro F. Armero
- Starring: Consuelo Trujillo; Fernando Sansegundo; Gloria Martínez; Eduardo Antuña; Patty Nonet; Cristina García; Pilar Matas; Nuria Mencía; Jordi Aguilar; José Carabias
- Edited by: Raúl de Torres
- Music by: Sergio Bertran
- Production companies: Quatre Films; Cuidado con el perro; Sideral; This and That
- Distributed by: Sideral Cinema
- Release dates: 7 October 2024 (Sitges); 7 February 2025 (Spain)
- Countries: Spain; Serbia
- Language: Spanish

Still Life with Ghosts (Spanish: Bodegón con fantasmas) is a 2024 Spanish-Serbian ensemble comedy film written and directed by Enrique Buleo.

== Plot ==
Structured in five episodes, the plot follows the mishaps of townsfolk and ghosts in a village of La Mancha.

== Cast ==
- Consuelo Trujillo
- Fernando Sansegundo
- Enric Benavent
- Gloria Martínez
- Eduardo Antuña
- Patty Bonet
- Cristina García
- Pilar Matas
- Bianca Kovacs
- Nuria Mencía
- Jordi Aguilar
- José Carabias

== Production ==
A Spanish-Serbian co-production, the film was produced by Quatre Films alongside Cuidado con el perro, Sideral, and This and That. Shooting locations in the province of Cuenca included Villanueva de la Jara, El Picazo, Casasimarro, Iniesta and Almodóvar del Pinar. Filming also took place in Castellón and Valencia.

== Release ==
Sideral acquired Spanish distribution rights to the film in advance of the film's release. The film had its world premiere at the 57th Sitges Film Festival on 7 October 2024. Its festival run also included selections for screenings at the 26th Abycine Albacete Independent Film Festival, the Gijón International Film Festival, and the Warsaw International Film Festival. It was released theatrically in Spain on 7 February 2025.

== Reception ==
Júlia Olmo of Cineuropa deemed Still Life with Ghosts to be "a film full of humour, an irregular film, at times bold and captivating, and at others too hackneyed".

== Accolades ==
Year	Award	Category	Nominee(s)	Result	Ref.
2025	12th Feroz Awards	Best Comedy Film		Nominated	
2025	7th Lola Gaos Awards	Best Film		Nominated	
2025	7th Lola Gaos Awards	Best Screenplay	Enrique Buleo	Nominated	
2025	7th Lola Gaos Awards	Best Actress	Pilar Matas	Nominated	
2025	7th Lola Gaos Awards	Best Art Direction	Lucía de Lope	Nominated	
2025	7th Lola Gaos Awards	Best Sound	José Manuel Sospedra, Martin Touron	Nominated	
2025	7th Lola Gaos Awards	Best Original Song	"Te Jubesk Din Injima Mja" by Dejan Pejovic	Nominated	

== See also ==
- List of Spanish films of 2025
