= Alcalá del Júcar =

Coordinates: 39°12′N 1°26′W

- municipality
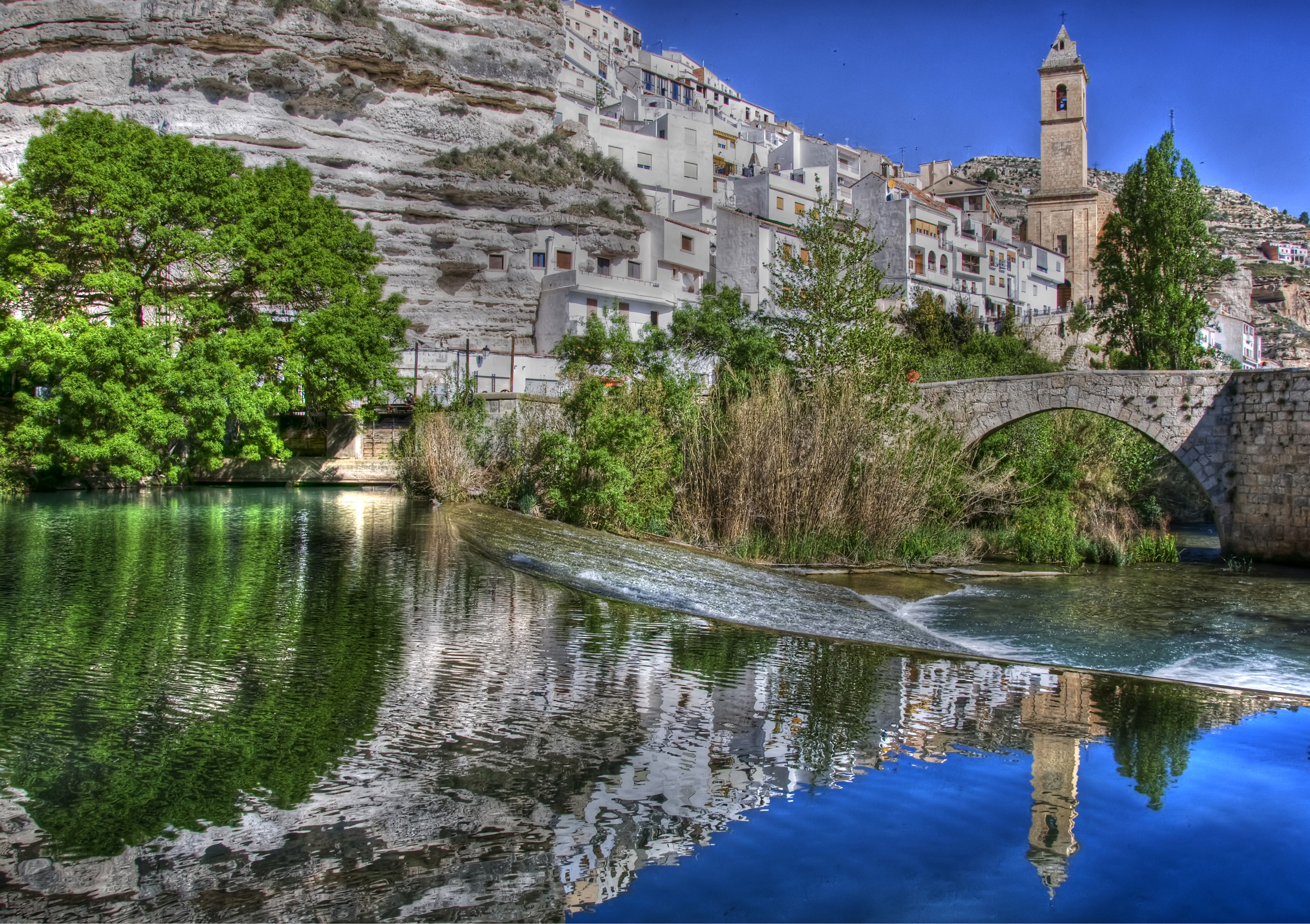

- Coat of arms
- Interactive map of Alcalá del Júcar
- Country: Spain
- Autonomous community: Castile-La Mancha
- Province: Albacete
- Comarca: Manchuela

Area
  - Total: 146.82 km^{2} (56.69 sq mi)
- Elevation: 596 m (1,955 ft)

Population (2025-01-01)
  - Total: 1,130
  - Density: 7.70/km^{2} (19.9/sq mi)
- Time zone: UTC+1 (CET)
  - Summer (DST): UTC+2 (CEST)

Alcalá del Júcar (Spanish: [alkaˈla ðel ˈxukaɾ]) is a Spanish municipality located in the southeastern part of the Iberian Peninsula, within the Province of Albacete, in the autonomous community of Castile-La Mancha. It has a population of 1,148 inhabitants (INE, 2022). The town, situated 64 kilometres (40 miles) from Albacete, was declared Conjunto histórico in 1982.

== Etymology ==
Alcalá is a Spanish toponym that refers to various localities associated with the presence of a castle. The word is a Castilian adaptation of the Arabic al-qala'a (القلعة), which literally means "the castle." Therefore, the name of the town Alcalá del Júcar would mean "castle of the Júcar."

== Geography ==
=== Location ===
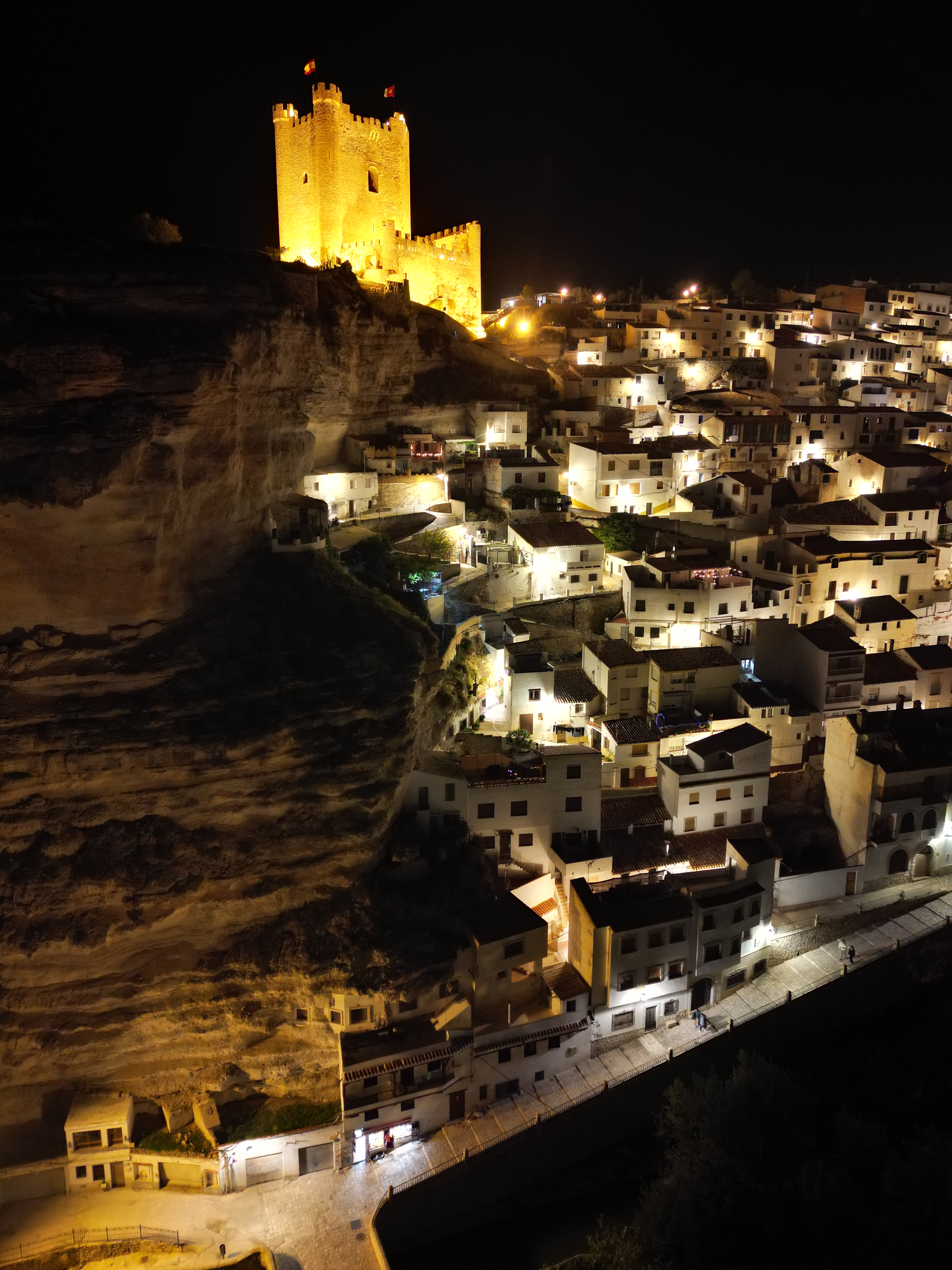
Alcalá del Júcar at night

The town of Alcalá del Júcar is situated within a deep gorge formed by the Júcar River, which traverses the region. The landscape is notable for its dramatic terrain, with the river meandering through steep limestone cliffs. Alcalá del Júcar is built on the sides of these cliffs, creating a distinctive visual impression, with its whitewashed houses appearing to cling to the rock face. The town is located in the Manchuela region, an area renowned for its rugged natural beauty and unique geological formations.

Alcalá del Júcar is bordered by several municipalities within the province of Albacete. Abengibre, Alatoz, Alborea, Carcelén, Casas de Ves, Casas-Ibáñez, Fuentealbilla and La Recueja.

== History ==
In 1211, a swift military campaign led by Alfonso VIII of Castile succeeded in wresting control of the strongholds of Garadén, Jorquera, and Alcalá from the Muslims, bringing them under the Crown of Castile. The conquest was solidified two years later, following the decisive victories over the Almohads at the Battle of Las Navas de Tolosa (1212) and the Battle of Alcaraz (1213). These victories dismantled the Arab defenses, paving the way for the repopulation of the lands in La Mancha and the present-day province of Albacete. After its definitive conquest, settlers from Alarcón established themselves in Alcalá.

Initially, Alcalá was a dependent village of Jorquera. However, on April 18, 1364, Peter of Castile, known as Pedro the Cruel, issued a charter in Grao de Valencia, granting Alcalá del Júcar the status of a town and its separation from Jorquera. This charter also provided Alcalá with a set of laws, municipal governance, and other rights.

Like other nearby settlements, Alcalá del Júcar became part of the Marquisate of Villena and experienced the various challenges associated with this peculiar lordship. The Marquisate of Villena played a significant role in the Middle Ages and in the formation of the modern Castilian monarchy until its dissolution following the Castilian Civil War in 1475.

Alcalá del Júcar was part of the Kingdom of Murcia within the Crown of Castile until the territorial reorganization of Spain in 1833, led by Minister Javier de Burgos, which created the province of Albacete. Ecclesiastically, Alcalá del Júcar belonged to the Diocese of Cartagena until the establishment of the Diocese of Albacete in 1949.

The town of Alcalá del Júcar was declared a Conjunto histórico (Historic-Artistic Site) by Royal Decree 2335/1982 on July 30 (published in the Official State Gazette No. 226 on September 1). The site is registered as a Bien de Interés Cultural (Cultural Heritage Site) with the identification number RI-53-0000261, as recognized by the Ministry of Culture of Spain.

Since 2014, Alcalá del Júcar has been officially recognized as one of "The Most Beautiful Villages in Spain" and has been a member of the association of the same name since that year.
