= Paracuellos =

Paracuellos may refer to:

== Places ==
- Paracuellos de Jarama;
- Paracuellos de Jiloca;
- Paracuellos de la Ribera;
- Paracuellos, Cuenca;
- Paracuellos massacres;

== In fiction ==
- Paracuellos (comics), comics by Carlos Giménez
