= Higinio García =

Spanish footballer

Personal information
- Full name: Higinio García Fernández
- Date of birth: 11 January 1956
- Place of birth: Valverdejo, Spain
- Date of death: 17 December 2017 (aged 61)
- Height: 1.90 m (6 ft 3 in)
- Position: Defender

Senior career*
Years	Team	Apps	(Gls)
1975–1977	Mestalla		
1976–1977	→ Gandía (loan)	27	(1)
1977–1980	Valencia	14	(1)
1980–1985	Murcia	124	(0)
1985–1987	Recreativo de Huelva	61	(4)
1987–1989	Villarreal	65	(3)
1989–1991	Orihuela Deportiva	53	(3)
Total		344	(12)

Managerial career
- 1997: Valencia B
- * Club domestic league appearances and goals

Higinio García Fernández (11 January 1956 – 17 December 2017) was a Spanish professional footballer who played for Valencia, Murcia, Recreativo de Huelva, Villarreal and Orihuela Deportiva, as a defender.
