= Villagarcia =

Villagarcia may refer to:

- Vilagarcía de Arousa, a municipality in Pontevedra, Galicia, Spain
- Villagarcía de Campos, a municipality in Valladolid, Castile and León, Spain
- Villagarcía del Llano, a municipality in Cuenca, Castile-La Mancha, Spain
- Villagarcía de la Torre, a municipality in Badajoz, Extremadura, Spain
- Villa García, a barrio of Montevideo, Uruguay
- Villa Garcia, a municipality in Zacatecas, Mexico
- Battle of Villagarcia or Llerena, 1812 in Spain, between Britain and France during the Peninsular War
