= Madrigueras =

Municipality of Spain

Coordinates: 39°14′N 1°48′W

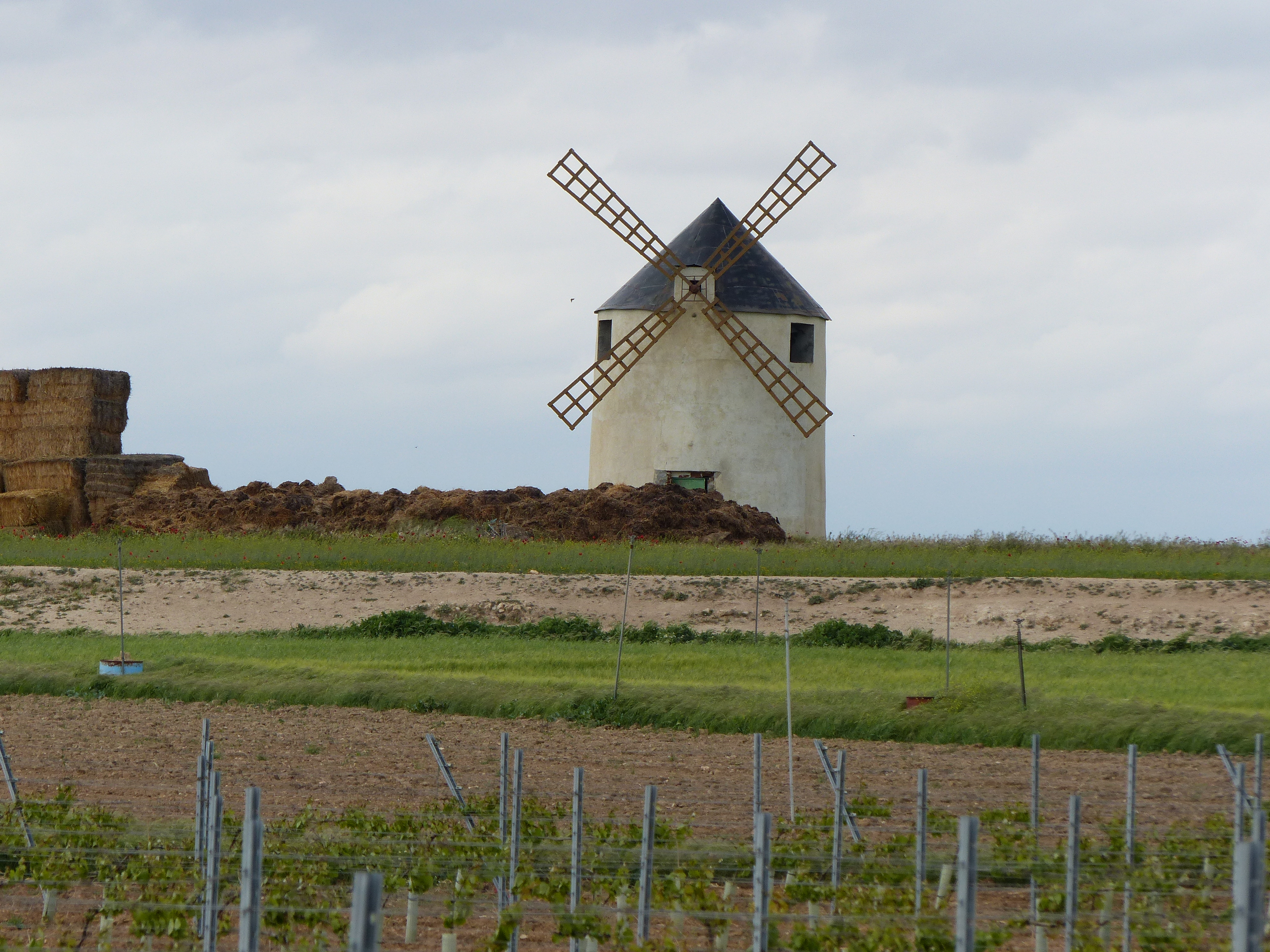

Madrigueras is a municipality in Albacete, Castile-La Mancha, Spain. It has a population of 4,917 according to the official statistics by the National Statistics Institute of Spain (INE). The principal productions of this village are wine, knives and spatulas. Madrigueras is referred to as "Little China" due to the great number of inhabitants who use bikes for transportation.

It was hit by major flooding in October 2026.

== Place names ==
It's common to hear that Madrigueras comes from the fact that this was a place rich in game and practically deserted, so rabbits and hares ran wild. Apart from the fact that this region doesn't seem to have been as deserted as was supposed in the Middle Ages, since the occupation of some places suggests just the opposite, it's surprising that two other places within the old Kingdom of Toledo, that is, within the La Mancha region in the broadest sense, have similar names: Madrid and Madridejos .

== Geography ==
Its municipal area covers an area of 73.31 km² and is bordered to the south by the Júcar River, which separates it from Albacete . To the southeast, it borders Motilleja . To the east, it borders Mahora and Villagarcía del Llano ( Cuenca ). To the north and west, it borders Tarazona de la Mancha.
