= Casas de Juan Núñez =

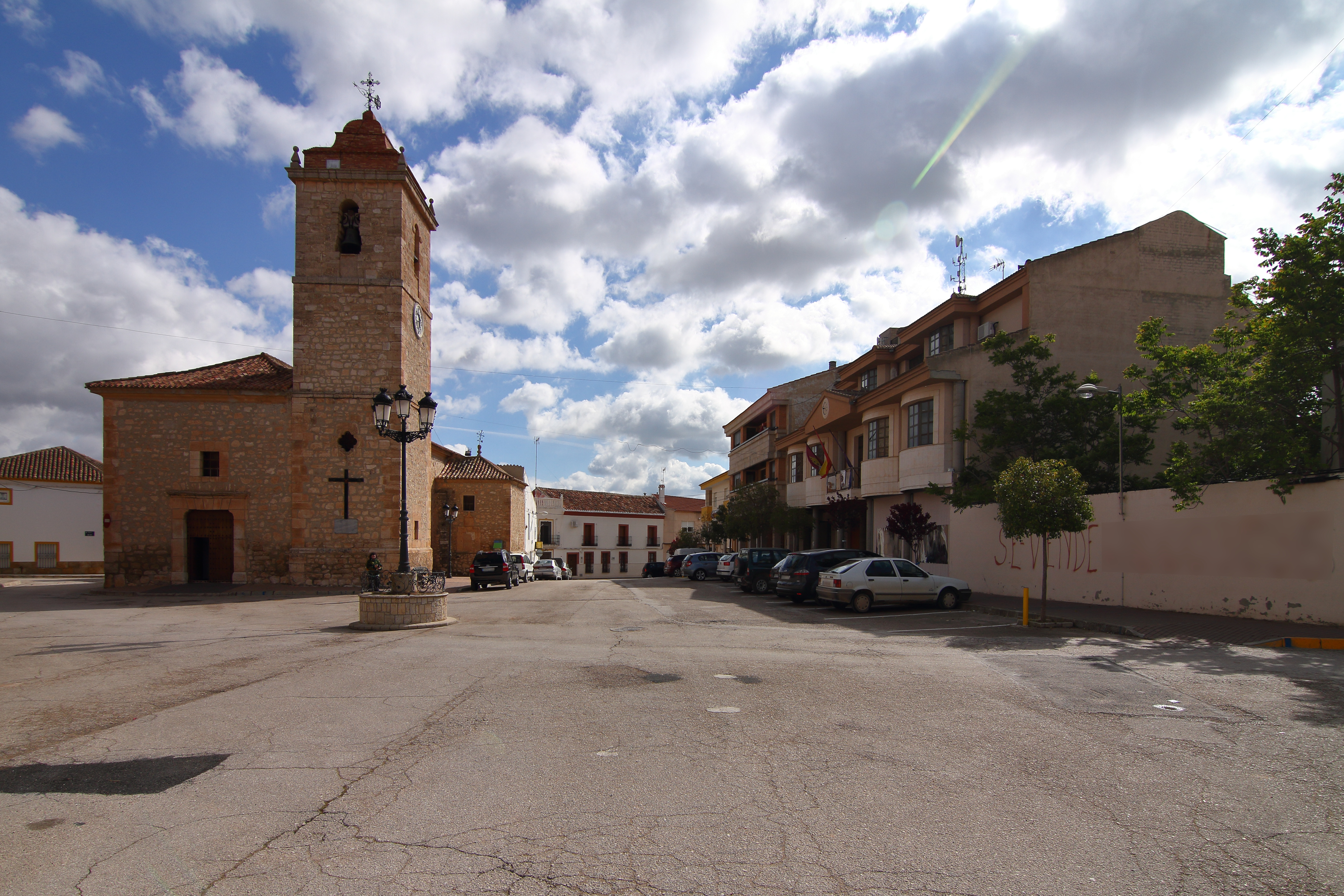

- Coat of arms

- Location in Albacete Location in Castilla-La Mancha Location in Spain
- Coordinates: 39°07′N 1°33′W
- Country: Spain
- Autonomous community: Castilla–La Mancha
- Province: Albacete
- Comarca: Manchuela

Government
  - Mayor: Juan Carlos Gómez González (PSOE)

Area
  - Total: 88.98 km^{2} (34.36 sq mi)
- Elevation: 705 m (2,313 ft)

Population (2025-01-01)
  - Total: 1,409
  - Density: 15.84/km^{2} (41.01/sq mi)
- Time zone: UTC+1 (CET)
  - Summer (DST): UTC+2 (CEST)
- Website: casasdejuannunez.es

Casas de Juan Núñez is a municipality in Albacete, Castile-La Mancha, Spain. It has a population of 1,372.

== See also ==
- Manchuela
