= Balsa de Ves =

Coordinates: 39°16′N 1°12′W

- Municipality
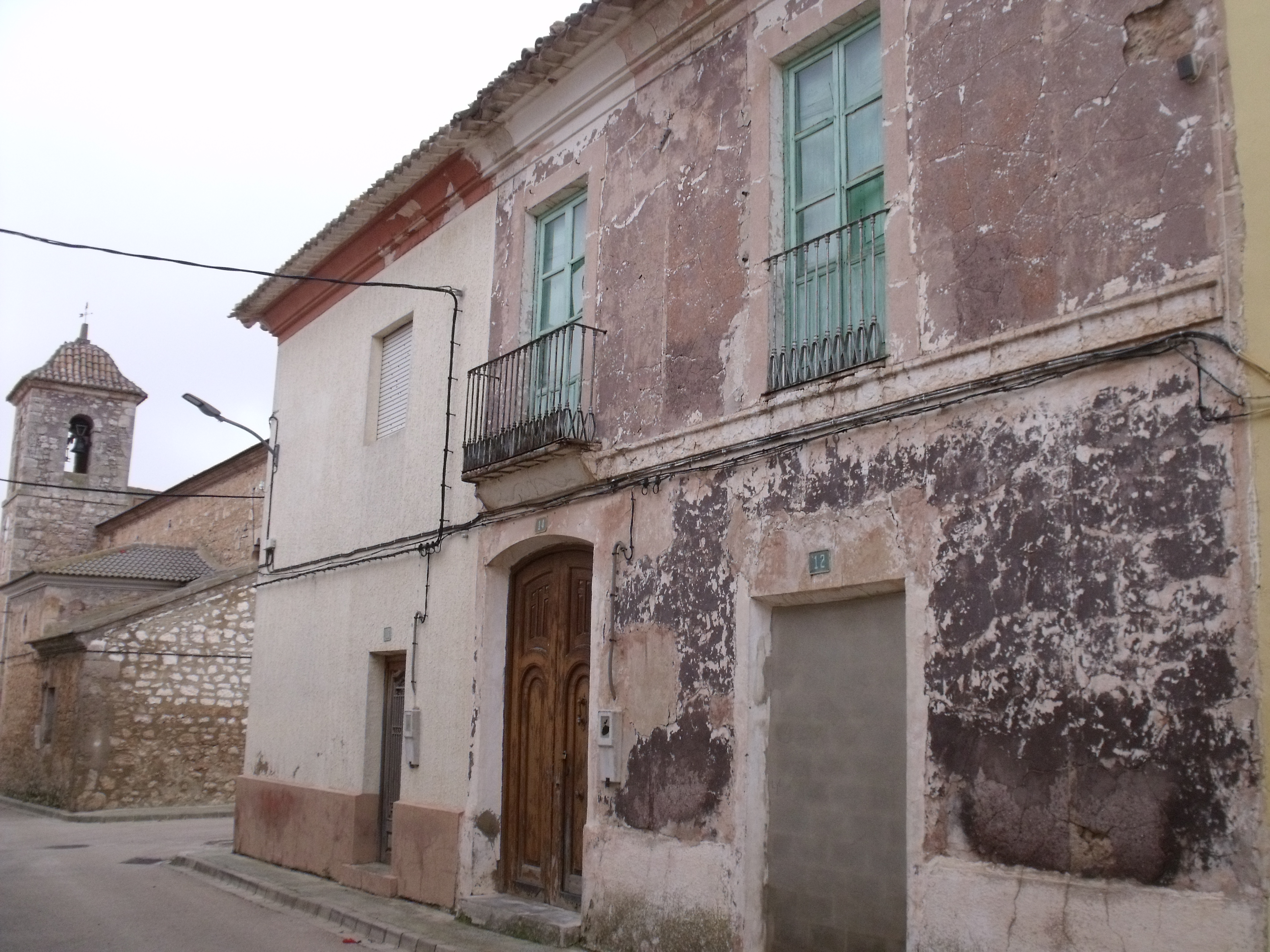

- Coat of arms
- Interactive map of Balsa de Ves
- Country: Spain
- Autonomous community: Castile-La Mancha
- Province: Cuenca
- Comarca: Manchuela

Area
  - Total: 76.3 km^{2} (29.5 sq mi)
- Elevation: 739 m (2,425 ft)

Population (2025-01-01)
  - Total: 121
  - Density: 1.59/km^{2} (4.11/sq mi)
- Time zone: UTC+1 (CET)
  - Summer (DST): UTC+2 (CEST)

Balsa de Ves is a municipality in Albacete, Castile-La Mancha, Spain. It has a population of 226.

== See also ==
- Manchuela
