= Golosalvo =

Municipality of Spain

- Municipality
- Golosalvo
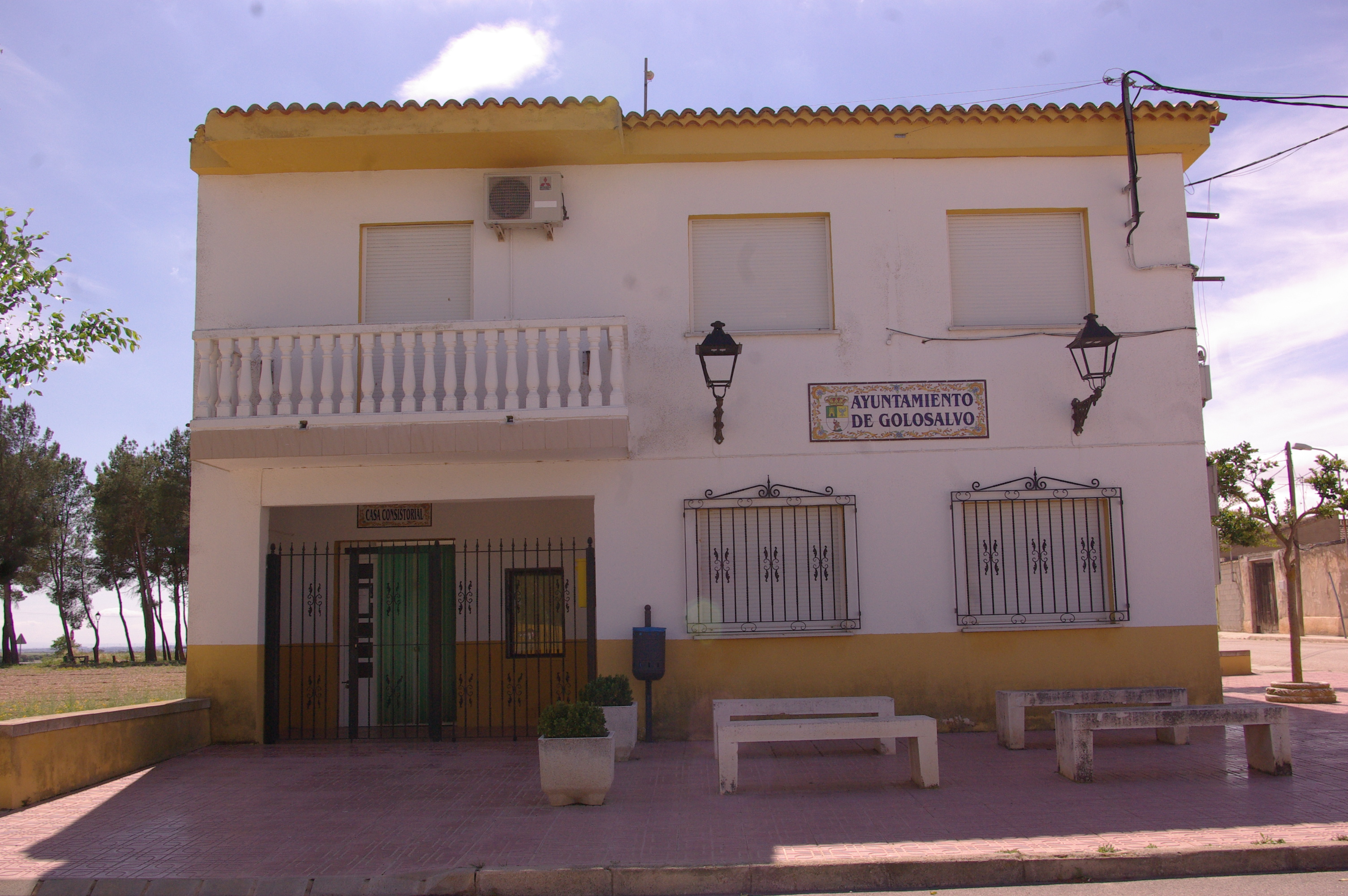
- Town hall

- Coat of arms

- Location in Spain Golosalvo (Spain)
- Coordinates: 39°14′N 1°38′W
- Country: Spain
- Autonomous community: Castile-La Mancha
- Province: Albacete
- Comarca: Manchuela

Government
  - Mayor: José Antonio Piqueras García

Area
  - Total: 28 km^{2} (11 sq mi)
- Elevation: 739 m (2,425 ft)

Population (2025-01-01)
  - Total: 79
  - Density: 2.8/km^{2} (7.3/sq mi)
- Time zone: UTC+1 (CET)
  - Summer (DST): UTC+2 (CEST)
- Postal code: 02253
- Official language(s): Castilian
- Website: golosalvo.es

Golosalvo is a municipality in Albacete, Castile-La Mancha, Spain. It has a population of 107.
