= Nuria Mencía =

Spanish actress

Nuria Mencía (born 1972) is a Spanish stage and screen actress. She won the Max Award for Best Actress for La respiración.

== Life and career ==
Mencía was born in Madrid in 1972 and spent her childhood in Puente de Vallecas. She studied in a high school around Tribunal and later received training at the RESAD and in Venice.

She made her professional debut onstage in a play of The Servant of Two Masters in 1995. Her debut was followed by credits in En la luna, Boston Marriage, Madre (el drama padre) and San Juan, for which she earned several nominations for the Max Awards and the Actors Union Awards.

She appeared in films such as Solitary Fragments, Fill Me with Life, Stones, The Murmuring Coast, The Night of the Sunflowers, My Prison Yard, The Tunnel Gang, Still Life with Ghosts, and La bola negra. Her television work include appearances in Vota Juan and Jakarta.

For her performance in the play La respiración she won the Max Award for Best Actress.

In 2017, she was living in Lisbon, Portugal. In 2011, she had one daughter with the actor Filipe Duarte (died 2020).

== Accolades ==
Year	Award	Category	Work	Result	Ref.
2017	20th Max Awards	Best Actress	La respiración	Won	
2020	29th Actors and Actresses Union Awards	Best Television Actress in a Secondary Role	Vota Juan	Nominated	
