= Quintanar del Rey =

- Municipality
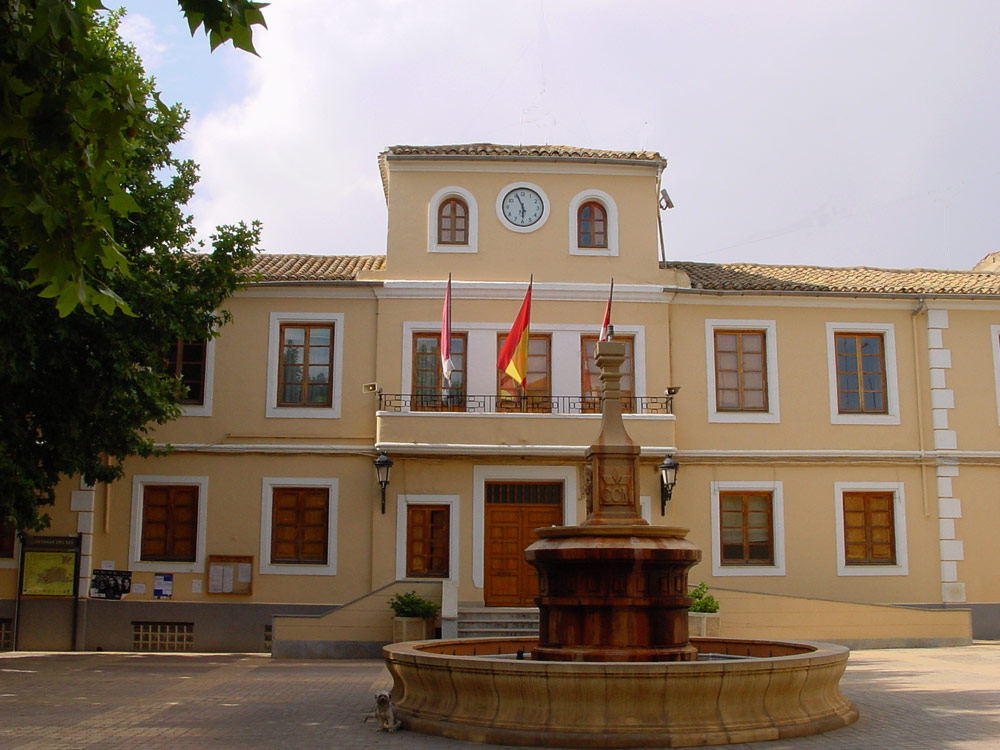
- Old Town Hall of Quintanar del Rey

- Flag Coat of arms

- Location in Spain
- Coordinates: 39°20′44″N 1°55′41″W
- Country: Spain
- Autonomous Community: Castile-La Mancha
- Province: Cuenca
- Comarca: Manchuela

Government
  - Mayor: Martín Cebrián López (PSOE)

Area
  - Total: 80 km^{2} (31 sq mi)
- Elevation (AMSL): 728 m (2,388 ft)

Population (2025-01-01)
  - Total: 7,508
  - Density: 94/km^{2} (240/sq mi)
- Time zone: UTC+1 (CET)
  - Summer (DST): UTC+2 (CEST (GMT +2))
- Postal code: 16220
- Area code: +34 (Spain) + 969 (Cuenca)
- Website: quintanardelrey.es

Quintanar del Rey is a municipality in Cuenca, Castile-La Mancha, Spain. It has a population of 8,043.
