= Pozo-Lorente =

Coordinates: 39°05′00″N 1°31′00″W

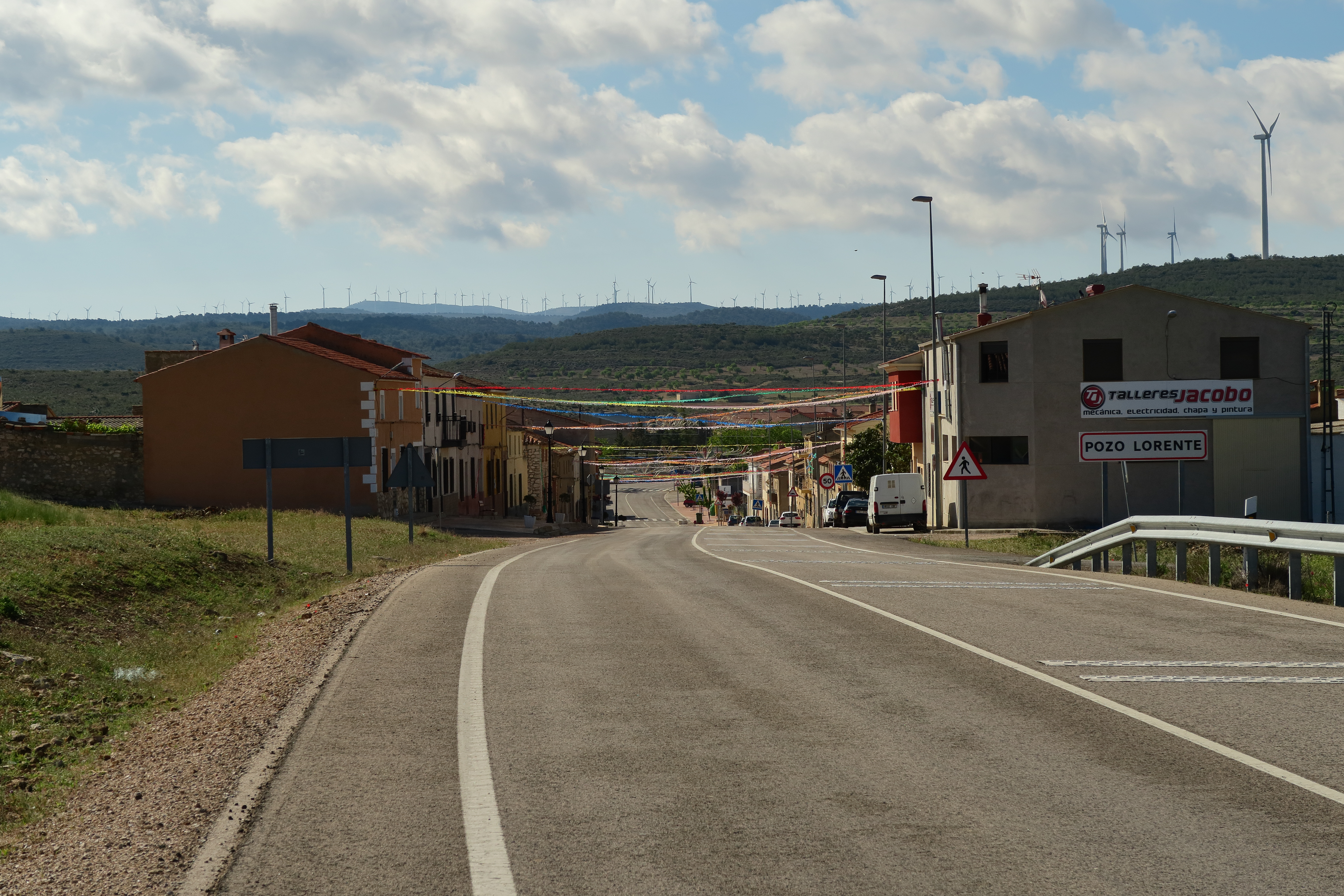

Coat of arms of Pozo-Lorente

Pozo-Lorente is a municipality in Albacete, Castile-La Mancha, Spain. It has a population of 292 as of 2023.
