= Villanueva de la Jara =

- municipality
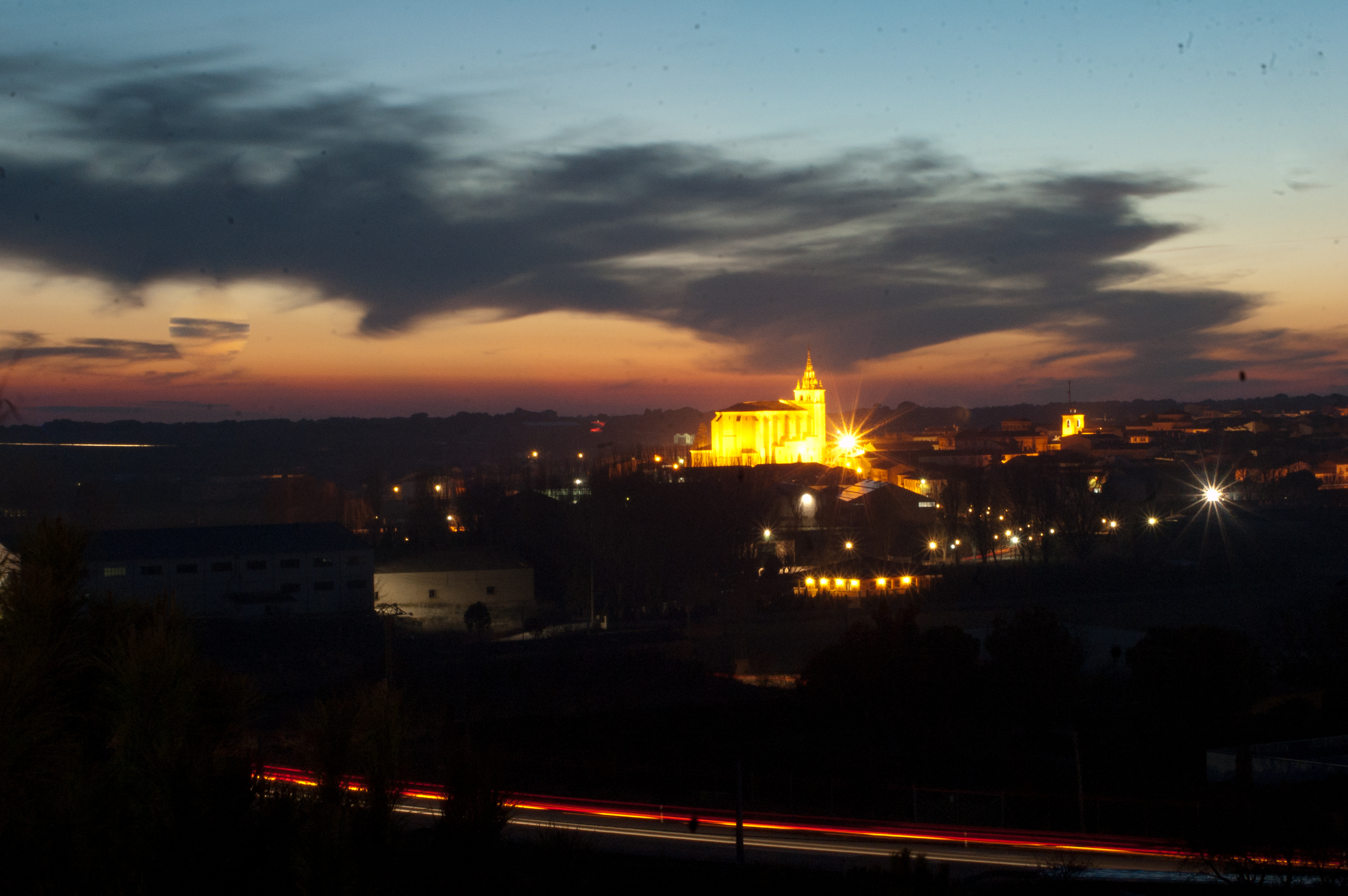

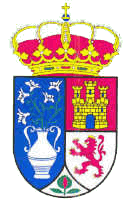
- Flag Coat of arms
- Nickname: Spanish: Jareño, jareña
- Interactive map of Villanueva de la Jara
- Coordinates: 36°28′N 6°12′W
- Country: Spain
- Autonomous community: Castile-La Mancha
- Province: Cuenca
- Comarca: La Manchuela
- Comarca: Manchuela Conquense
- Municipality: Villanueva de la Jara
- Founded: Roman remains. Grant of villa since 1476

Government
  - Mayor: Mercedes Herreras Fogarty (PP)

Area
  - Total: 156 km^{2} (60 sq mi)

Population (2025-01-01)
  - Total: 2,396
  - Density: 15.4/km^{2} (39.8/sq mi)
- Time zone: UTC+1 (CET)
  - Summer (DST): UTC+2 (CEST)

Villanueva de la Jara, popularly called La Jara, is a town and municipality in the Manchuela Conquense comarca, this in turn is part of the La Manchuela comarca, province of Cuenca, in Castile-La Mancha, Spain. It is known for the cultivation of portobellos and other edible fungi which is the main economic activity of the locality.

== History ==
Villanueva de la Jara was founded by Alarcón's inhabitants in the 13th or 14th century. It became independent in 1476 thanks to the Catholic Monarchs. The village participated actively in the Castilian War of the Communities. In the War of the Spanish Succession Charles VI, Holy Roman Emperor looted and burned part of the village. In the Spanish Civil War the village had an aerodrome that was used by International Brigades.

== Huellas de Teresa de Ávila ==
The town is part of the Tracks of Saint Teresa of Ávila, route of pilgrimage, tourism, culture and heritage which brings together the 17 cities where Saint Teresa of Ávila left her track in form of foundations the route does not have an established order or limited time as each pilgrim or visitor can do it.

== Distance to other cities in Spain ==
- Albacete – 60.5 km (37.6 mi)
- Cuenca – 84.6 km (52.6 mi)
- Madrid – 219.8 km (136.6 mi)
- Toledo – 207.8 km (129.1 mi)
- Valencia – 156.7 km (97.4 mi)

== Main sights ==
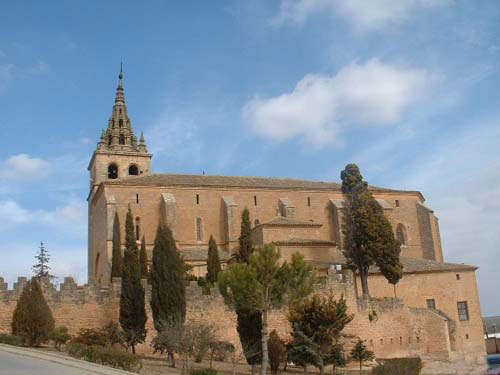
Basílica de Nuestra Señora de la Asunción, inside has a beautiful Rococo chapel

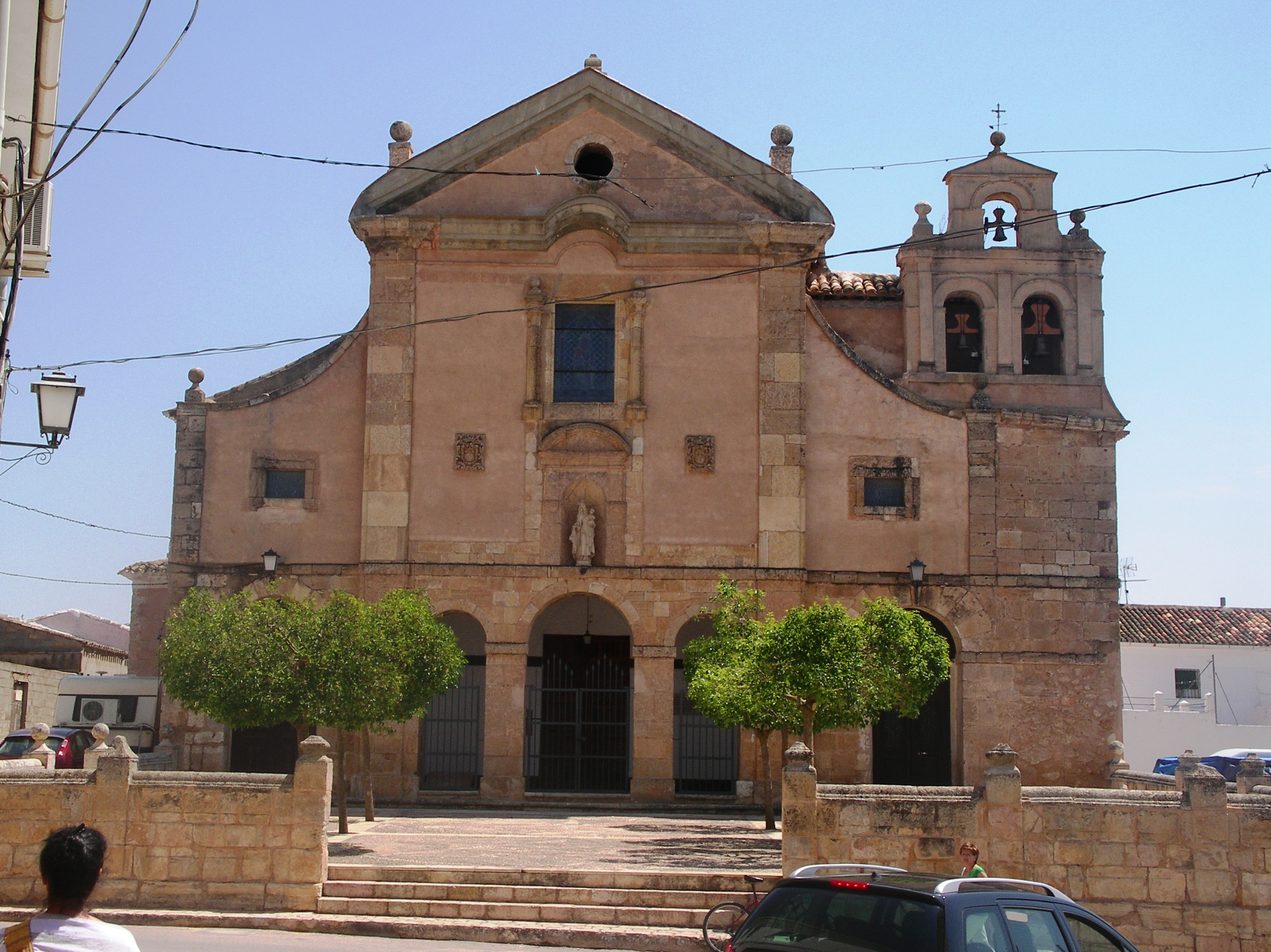
Iglesia de El Carmen

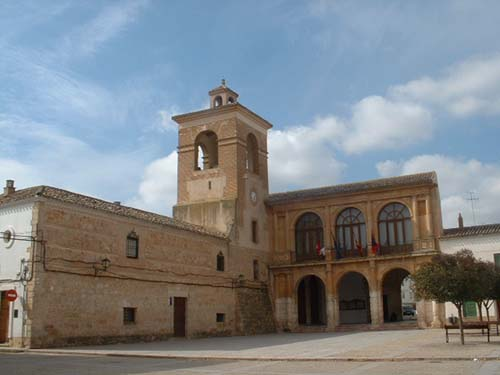
Town hall

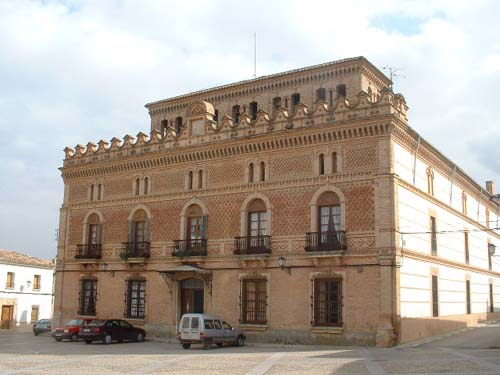
Villa Enriqueta

- Rollo de Justicia, built in 15th century, when Queen Isabella I of Castile "the Catholic" won the War of the Castilian Succession, compensated the locals in 1479 with the Privilege of Town and its Fuero and the following year with the letter of Demarcation, separating it from the town de Alarcón and giving them rights of town and whose symbol those privileges included to impart justice is this Rollo de Justicia it see the arrival in town. In this historic monument formerly it executed who violated the old laws. It is located on a base of three steps, it is a cylindrical roll with approximately 3.5 meters high, led by four holes, one for each side.
- Plaza Mayor (Main square), It is the central element of the town, there include the following buildings:

- On one side is the Town Hall, 16th century Renaissance building, this is attributed to the Italian architect Andrea Roddi.

- The old Granary, built in 15th-16th centuries, next to Town Hall and today is a Medical Center.

- Stands the Torre del Reloj (Clock Tower), vestige of the medieval headquarters building of the primitive Town Hall, of three floors.

- Also here is the Posada Massó, Renaissance style, which is one of the best examples of typical Castilian inn, that occupied for years both travelers and outsiders who came to work or to stay in the town. The building and its wooden deck are of the 16th century. Also has portals in brick and keystone marked with hollow rectangular frame.

- In the same square, in front of the Town Hall, is the Villa Enriqueta, a Neo-Mudéjar palatial house of 19th century. The building, which according to the inscription on the facade dates from 1899 and is named as Villa Enriqueta, was commissioned by Jesús Casanova for use as his private residence. And if at first it was a palace, then it became a military hospital during the Spanish Civil War and is now owned by several families whose homes are situated around a central courtyard. Factory made in brick of two colors placed mostly decoratively creating cruciform, floral motifs, etc., decorating the crenellated shot on the cover of lower volume of the building, the arches of the five balconies on the first floor and of the ten wickets paired in the second. Also of brick, the volume that tops the building, rectangular as a covered hipped tower, seems to be a kind of gallery or covered corridor whose walls are pierced by windows arches and under midpoint arches.

- In the square also is a 20th-century Guardia Civil Barracks House.

- Basílica de Nuestra Señora de la Asunción, built in 15th century with the stones of the Moorish castle stood here and that remains only some towers of the wall around it and looking the near river. What see today is a reconstruction of it made in the 16th century, with the stones of the walls of the former castle, but lower than that of the primitive castle. The bell tower of the church is topped by a pinnacle. In its normal access to it, see the primitive cour d'honneur of the castle in access by the compass of the basilica. The main entrance of the basilica is a big Neoclassical portal of 17th-18th centuries. Inside the Basilica presents a wide 16th century main nave, with rib vaults and a 17th-century Baroque altarpiece of presiding over the high altar, presided over by a replica carving of the Assumption, the original image of this virgin possibly was of 17th century and was burned during the Spanish Civil War. The basilica has an 18th-century Rococo chapel, that of the Virgin of the Rosary, of Greek cross, of highly decorated dome and reredos, and beautiful murals on the sides. In the main nave has a 17th-century pulpit. It also has a 16th-century christ sculpture Cristo de las Llagas. Also it highlights a Gothic cover of a small chapel, and a 16th-century reredos that can see on one side of the nave with St. Martin of Tours and the Coronation of the Virgin. The basilica has its museum Museo de la Sacristía.
- Iglesia del Carmen, some years after the visit of Teresa of Ávila, the Discalced Carmelites Friars who were in La Roda came over here and founded a convent that now only remains this church. The building is a single nave with a Latin cross and semicircular dome. In one of the chapels (not been able to locate) was buried the anchorite Catherine of Cardona. The building built in 1587 is likely to be by some disciple of Juan Gómez de Mora or Friar Alberto de la Madre de Dios, simple facade with belfry in a side and simple interior of its main nave, with a dome, and whose high altar is a simple reredos, in whose center is the virgin Virgen de las Nieves patron of the town's Catholics, a 14th-century Gothic image sitting on an armless chair with a knob on the right hand and holding on her left to her Child. The church has an 18th-century pulpit.
- Convento de las Carmelitas, It was founded by St. Teresa of Ávila in 1580. It consists of church, convent and cloister. It is an isolated building that is a whole town block and surrounded by walls. Inside are 17th-century paintings of the reredos and a Mudéjar wooden roof that covers the presbytery forming a star with 32 points. It also highlights the sepulcher of its first abbess Sor Ana de San Agustín, to whose charge was the convent once Saint Teresa left Villanueva de la Jara.
- Casa de la Música.
- Convento de Concepcionistas, a 16th-century Rennasaince convent.
- Ermita de San Antonio Abad, an 18th-century hermitage.
- Laundries of the Valdemembra river.
- Colegio de la Latinidad, a 19th-century Eclectic college.
- Manor houses.

== Other towns within the municipality ==
- Casas de Santa Cruz
- Ribera de San Benito
