= Valverdejo =

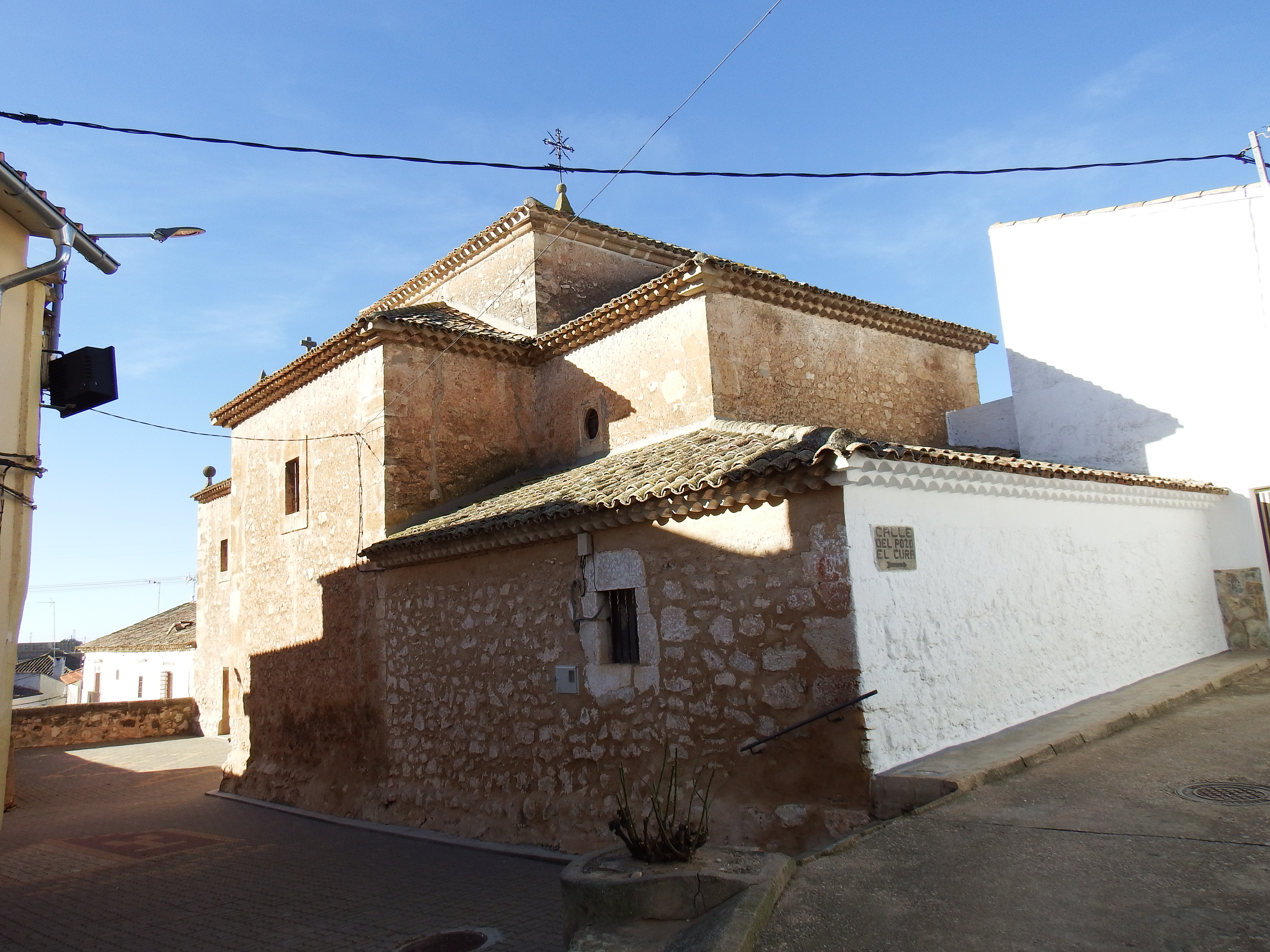

- Flag Coat of arms

- Location within Spain Location within Castilla-La Mancha
- Coordinates: 39°37′N 2°01′W
- Country: Spain
- Autonomous community: Castile-La Mancha
- Province: Cuenca
- Comarca: Manchuela

Area
  - Total: 32 km^{2} (12 sq mi)

Population (2025-01-01)
  - Total: 86
  - Density: 2.7/km^{2} (7.0/sq mi)
- Time zone: UTC+1 (CET)
  - Summer (DST): UTC+2 (CEST)

Valverdejo is a municipality located in the province of Cuenca, Castile-La Mancha, Spain. According to the 2004 census (INE), the municipality has a population of 129.

== See also ==
- Manchuela
