= Almodóvar del Pinar =

- municipality
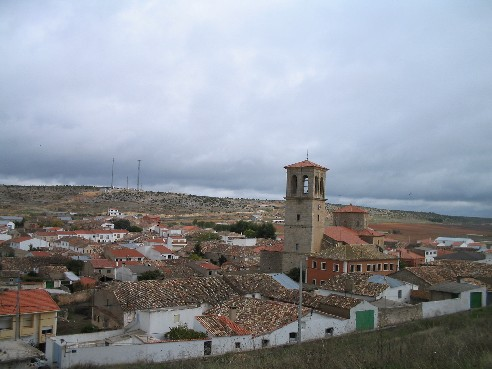

- Coat of arms

- Location in Spain
- Coordinates: 39°43′N 1°15′W
- Country: Spain
- Autonomous community: Castile-La Mancha
- Province: Cuenca
- Comarca: Manchuela

Government
  - Mayor: Francisco Jesus Ibañez Monedero

Area
  - Total: 95.03 km^{2} (36.69 sq mi)
- Elevation: 993 m (3,258 ft)

Population (2025-01-01)
  - Total: 401
  - Density: 4.22/km^{2} (10.9/sq mi)
- Demonyms: Almodovareños, Pinocheros
- Time zone: UTC+1 (CET)
  - Summer (DST): UTC+2 (CEST)
- ISO 3166 code: ESP

Almodóvar del Pinar is a municipality in Cuenca, Castile-La Mancha, Spain. It had a population of 393 as of 2020.
