= Villarta =

Villarta, Spain
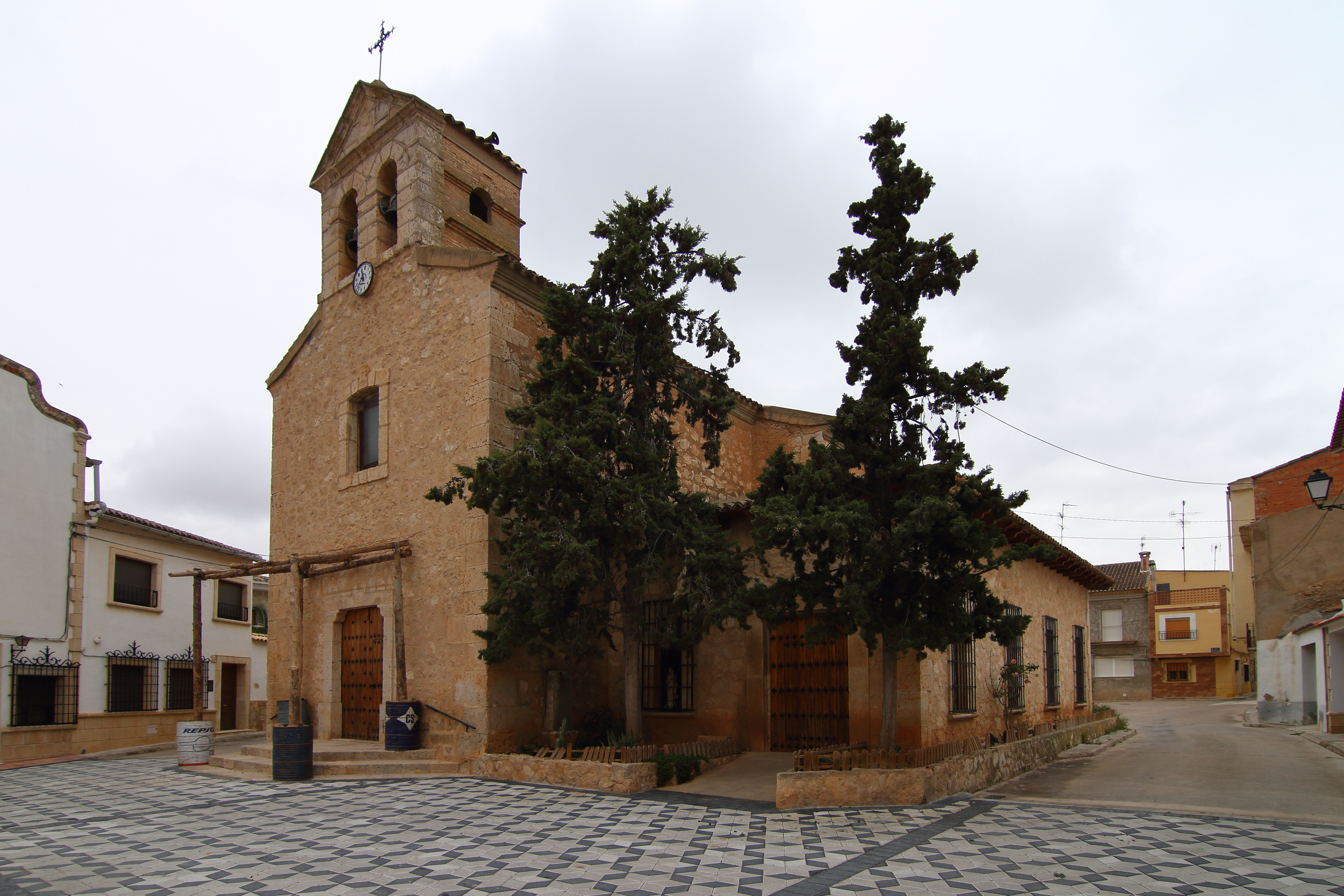
- The Church of Villarta

- Flag Coat of arms

- Location within Spain Location within Castilla-La Mancha
- Coordinates: 39°27′N 1°39′W
- Country: Spain
- Autonomous community: Castile-La Mancha
- Province: Cuenca
- Municipality: Villarta

Area
  - Total: 25 km^{2} (9.7 sq mi)

Population (2025-01-01)
  - Total: 853
  - Density: 34/km^{2} (88/sq mi)
- Time zone: UTC+1 (CET)
  - Summer (DST): UTC+2 (CEST)

Villarta is a municipality located in the province of Cuenca, Castile-La Mancha, Spain. According to the 2004 census (INE), the municipality has a population of 820 inhabitants.
