= Alborea =

- municipality
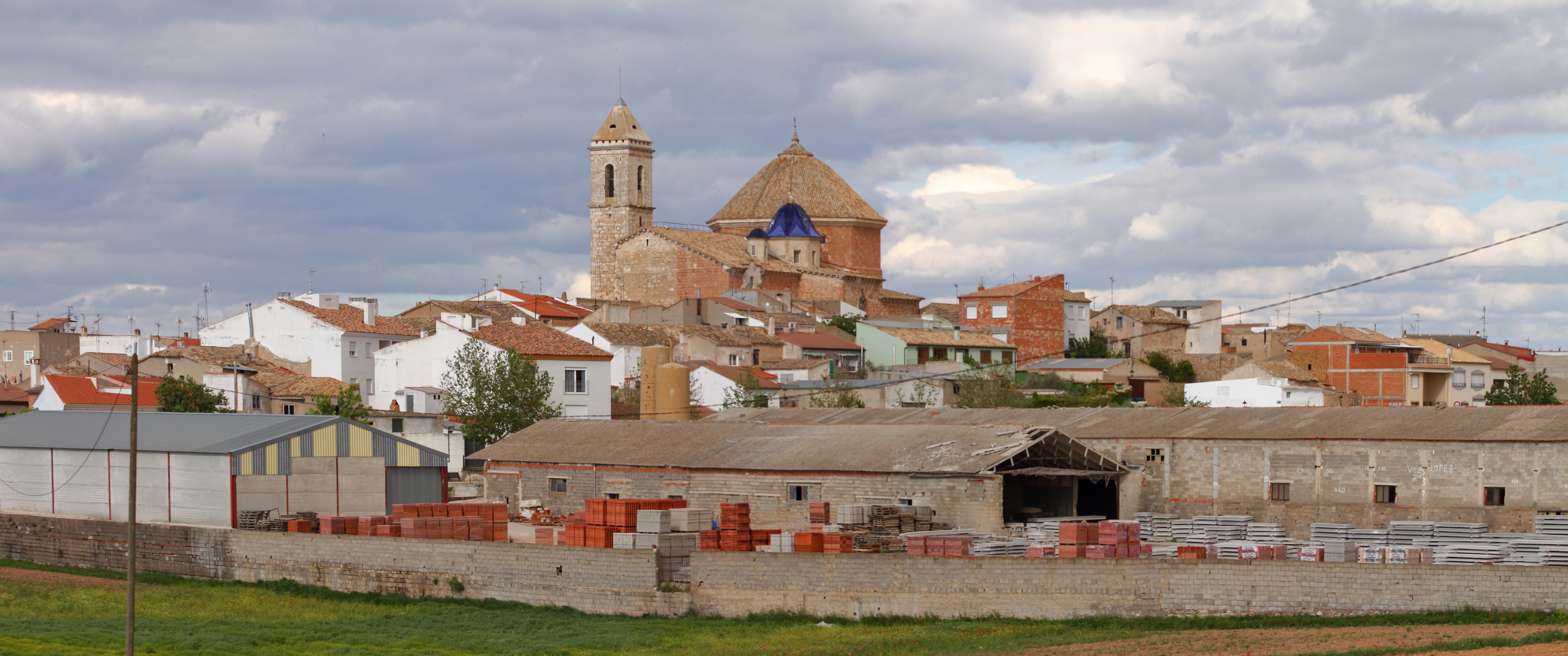

- Coat of arms

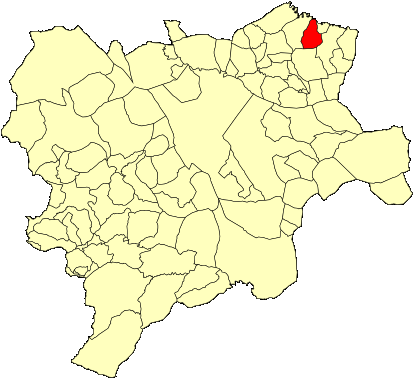
- Alborea in the province of Albacete
- Coordinates: 39°16′46″N 1°23′45″W
- Country: Spain
- Autonomous community: Castile-La Mancha
- Province: Cuenca
- Comarca: Manchuela

Area
  - Total: 72 km^{2} (28 sq mi)
- Elevation: 710 m (2,330 ft)

Population (2025-01-01)
  - Total: 672
  - Density: 9.3/km^{2} (24/sq mi)
- Time zone: UTC+1 (CET)
  - Summer (DST): UTC+2 (CEST)

Alborea is a municipality in Albacete, Castile-La Mancha, Spain. It has a population of 870.

== See also ==
- Manchuela
