= Carcelén =

Coordinates: 39°06′N 1°19′W

- municipality
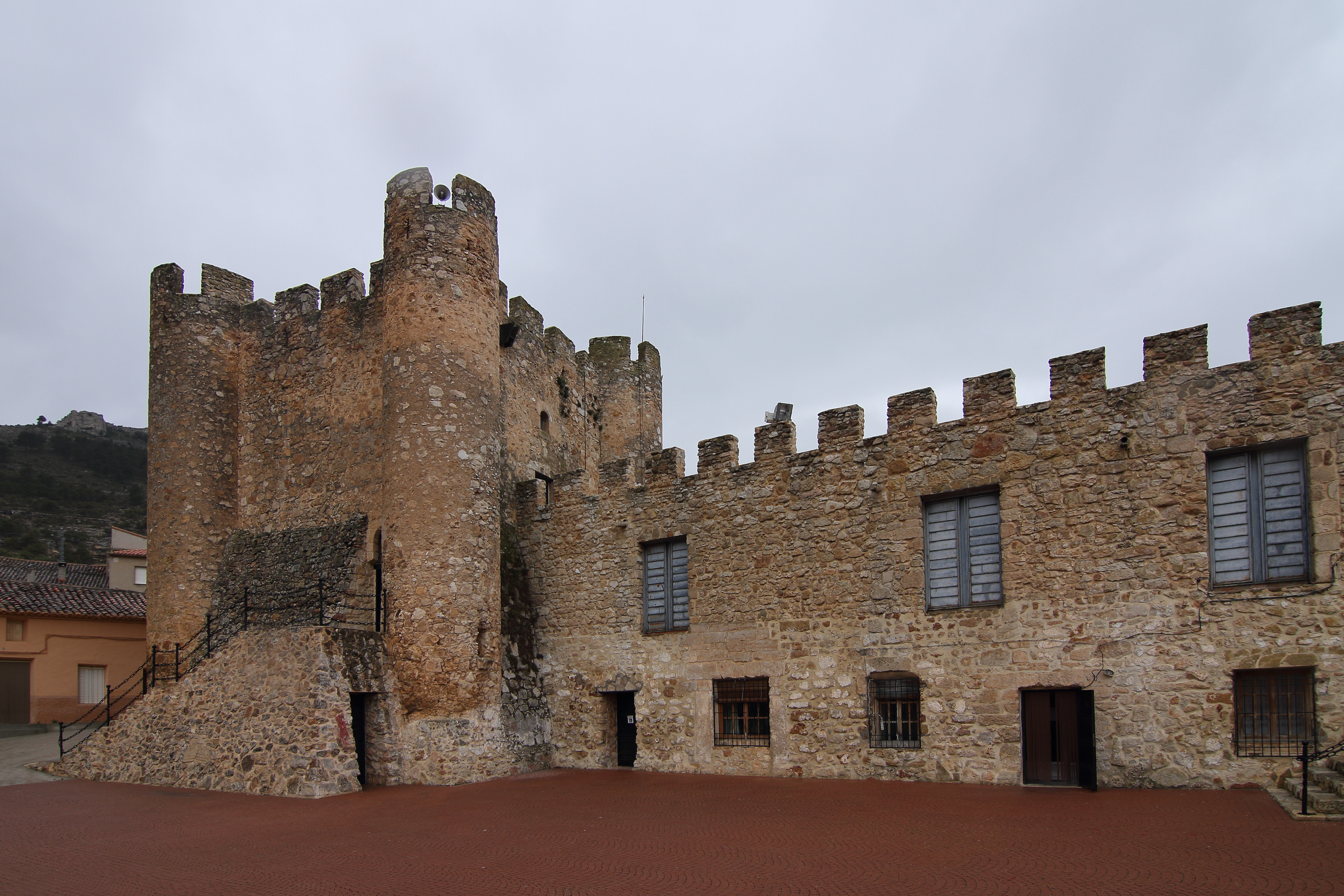
- Castle of Carcelén

- Coat of arms
- Interactive map of Carcelén
- Country: Spain
- Autonomous community: Castile-La Mancha
- Province: Cuenca
- Comarca: Manchuela

Area
  - Total: 75.3 km^{2} (29.1 sq mi)
- Elevation: 902 m (2,959 ft)

Population (2025-01-01)
  - Total: 483
  - Density: 6.41/km^{2} (16.6/sq mi)
- Time zone: UTC+1 (CET)
  - Summer (DST): UTC+2 (CEST)

Carcelén is a municipality in Albacete, Castile-La Mancha, Spain. It has a population of 508.

== Villages ==
- Carcelén
- Casas de Juan Gil

== Politics ==
Antonio Moreno (politician) got elected mayor of the city in 2023.

== See also ==
- Manchuela
