= Iniesta, Cuenca =

Iniesta
- municipality
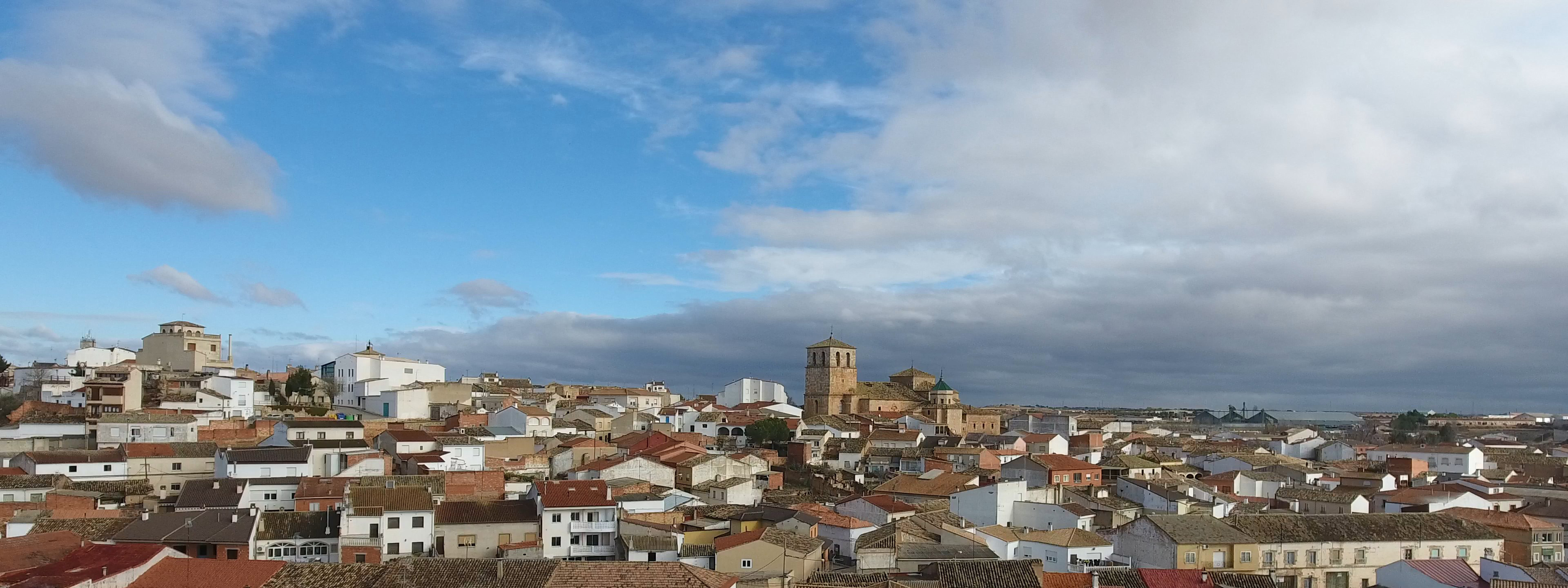

- Coat of arms

- Location within Spain Location within Castilla-La Mancha
- Coordinates: 39°26′30″N 1°44′59″W
- Country: Spain
- Autonomous community: Castile-La Mancha
- Province: Cuenca
- Comarca: Manchuela

Area
  - Total: 232.3 km^{2} (89.7 sq mi)
- Elevation: 969 m (3,179 ft)

Population (2025-01-01)
  - Total: 4,567
  - Density: 19.66/km^{2} (50.92/sq mi)
- Time zone: UTC+1 (CET)
  - Summer (DST): UTC+2 (CEST)

Iniesta is a municipality located in the province of Cuenca, Castile-La Mancha, Spain. According to the 2009 census (INE), the municipality has a population of 4,685 inhabitants.

== Villages ==
- Iniesta
- Alcahozo
- Casas de Juan Fernández

== See also ==
- Manchuela
