= Pozorrubielos de la Mancha =

- municipality
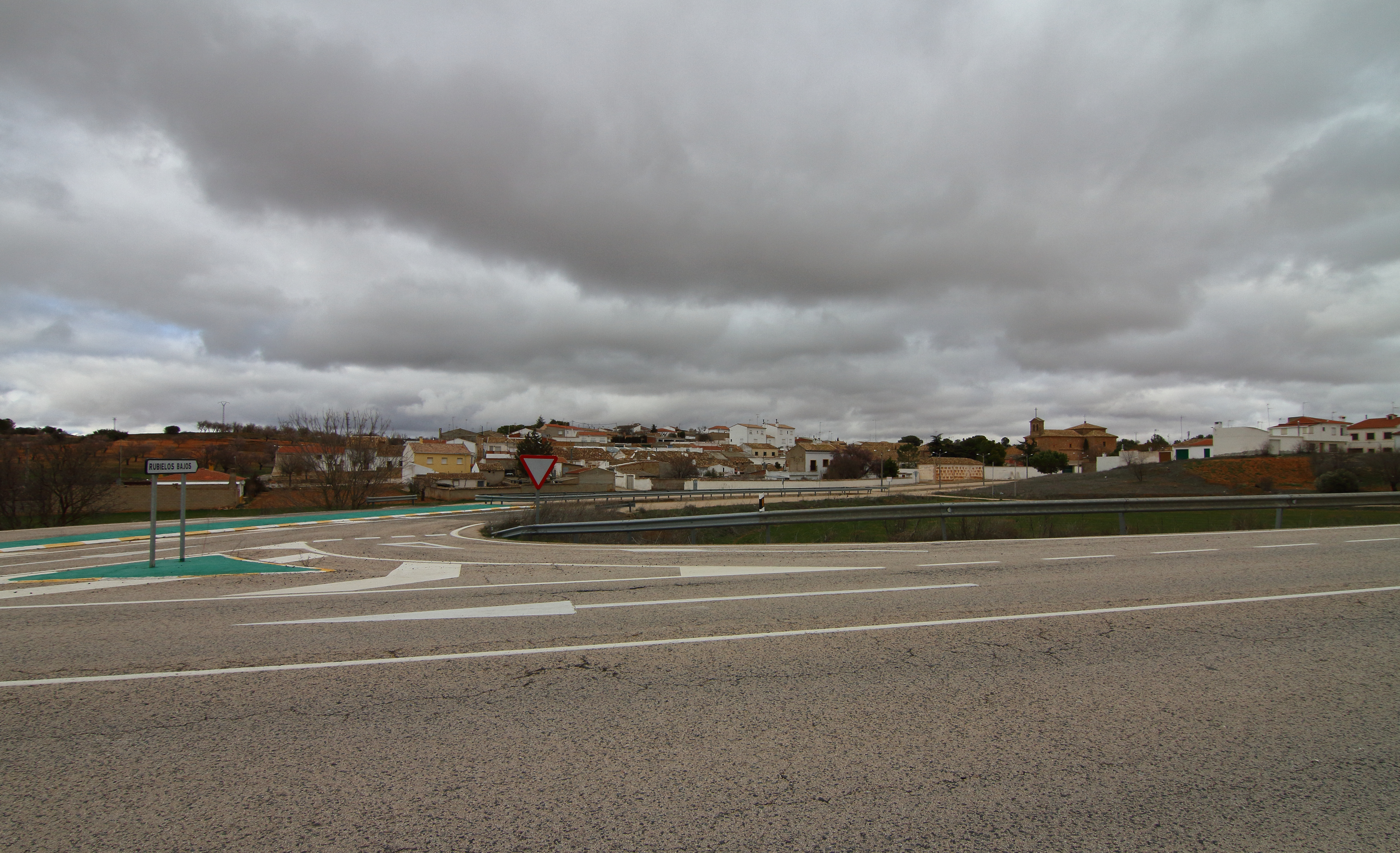

- Location within Spain Location within Castilla-La Mancha
- Coordinates: 39°26′45″N 2°02′19″W
- Country: Spain
- Autonomous community: Castile-La Mancha
- Province: Cuenca
- Municipality: Pozorrubielos de la Mancha

Area
  - Total: 73 km^{2} (28 sq mi)

Population (2025-01-01)
  - Total: 166
  - Density: 2.3/km^{2} (5.9/sq mi)
- Time zone: UTC+1 (CET)
  - Summer (DST): UTC+2 (CEST)

Pozorrubielos de la Mancha is a municipality located in the province of Cuenca, Castile-La Mancha, Spain. According to the 2004 census (INE), the municipality has a population of 276 inhabitants.
