= Buenache de Alarcón =

Municipality in Cuenca Province, Castile-La Mancha, Spain

- Municipality
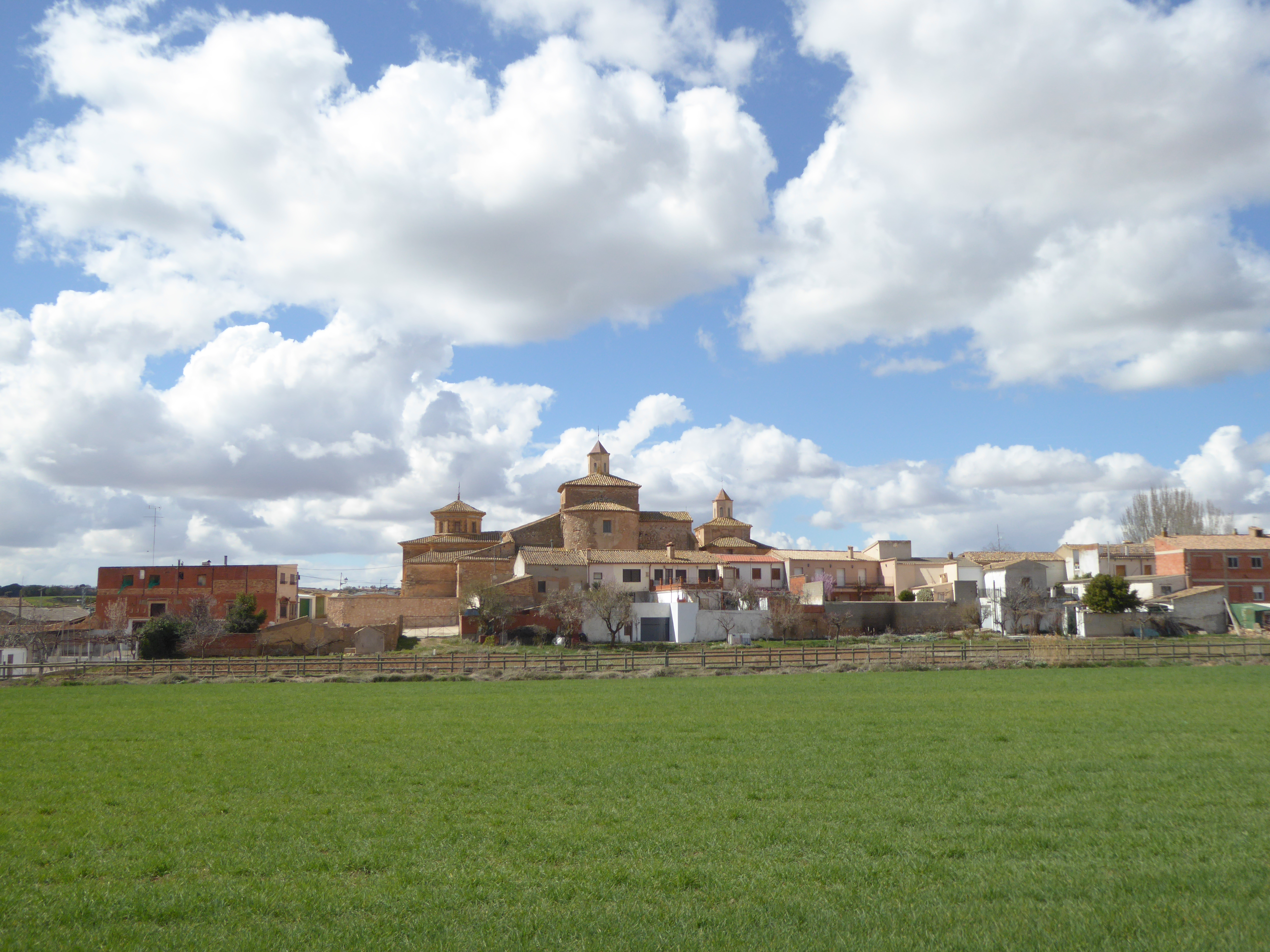

- Flag Coat of arms

- Location within Spain Location within Castilla-La Mancha
- Coordinates: 39°39′N 2°10′W
- Country: Spain
- Autonomous community: Castile-La Mancha
- Province: Cuenca

Population (2025-01-01)
  - Total: 447
- Time zone: UTC+1 (CET)
  - Summer (DST): UTC+2 (CEST)

Buenache de Alarcón is a municipality in the province of Cuenca, Castile-La Mancha, Spain. It has a population of 616.
