= Villalpardo =

Villalpardo, Spain
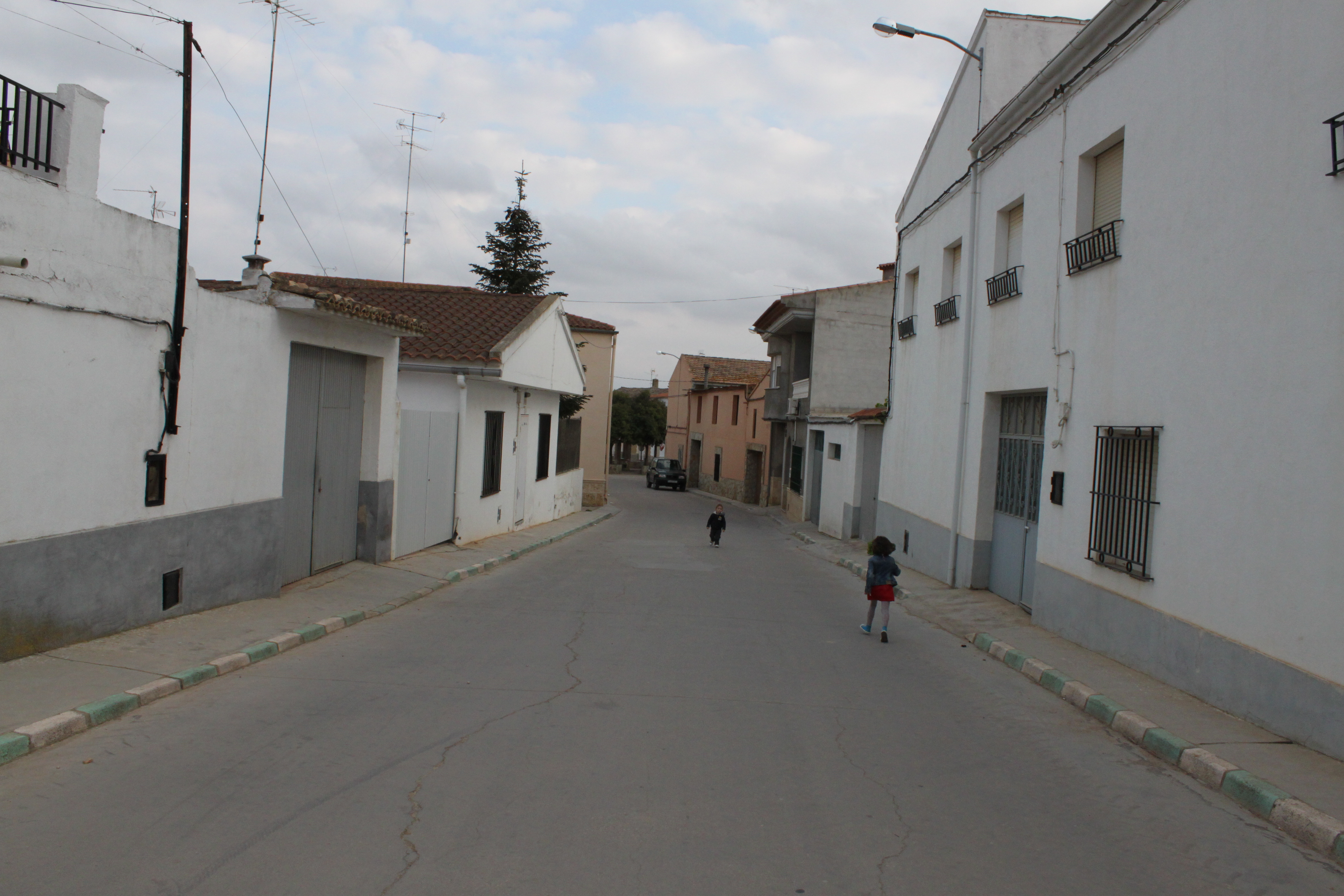

- Coat of arms

- Location within Spain Location within Castilla-La Mancha
- Country: Spain
- Autonomous community: Castile-La Mancha
- Province: Cuenca
- Municipality: Villalpardo

Area
  - Total: 31 km^{2} (12 sq mi)

Population (2025-01-01)
  - Total: 979
  - Density: 32/km^{2} (82/sq mi)
- Time zone: UTC+1 (CET)
  - Summer (DST): UTC+2 (CEST)

Villalpardo is a municipality located in the province of Cuenca, Castile-La Mancha, Spain. According to the 2004 census (INE), the municipality has a population of 1,141 inhabitants.
