= Pozoamargo =

- municipality
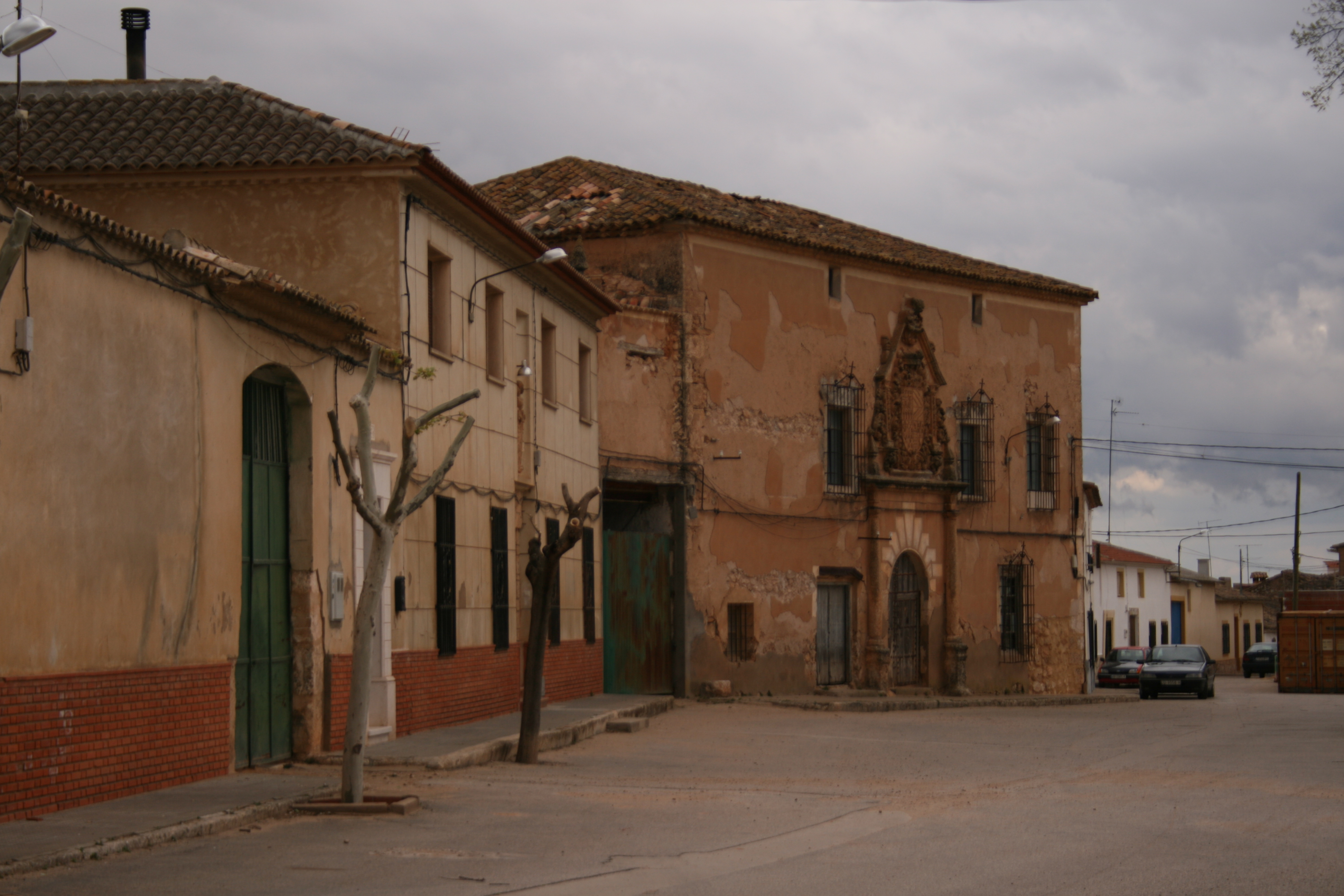
- Street of Pozoamargo

- Location within Spain Location within Castilla-La Mancha
- Coordinates: 39°22′N 2°12′W
- Country: Spain
- Autonomous community: Castile-La Mancha
- Province: Cuenca
- Municipality: Pozoamargo

Area
  - Total: 52 km^{2} (20 sq mi)
- Elevation: 752 m (2,467 ft)

Population (2025-01-01)
  - Total: 255
  - Density: 4.9/km^{2} (13/sq mi)
- Time zone: UTC+1 (CET)
  - Summer (DST): UTC+2 (CEST)

Pozoamargo is a municipality located in the province of Cuenca, Castile-La Mancha, Spain. According to the 2006 census (INE), the municipality has a population of 382 inhabitants.
