= Abengibre =

Coordinates: 39°13′N 1°32′W

- municipality
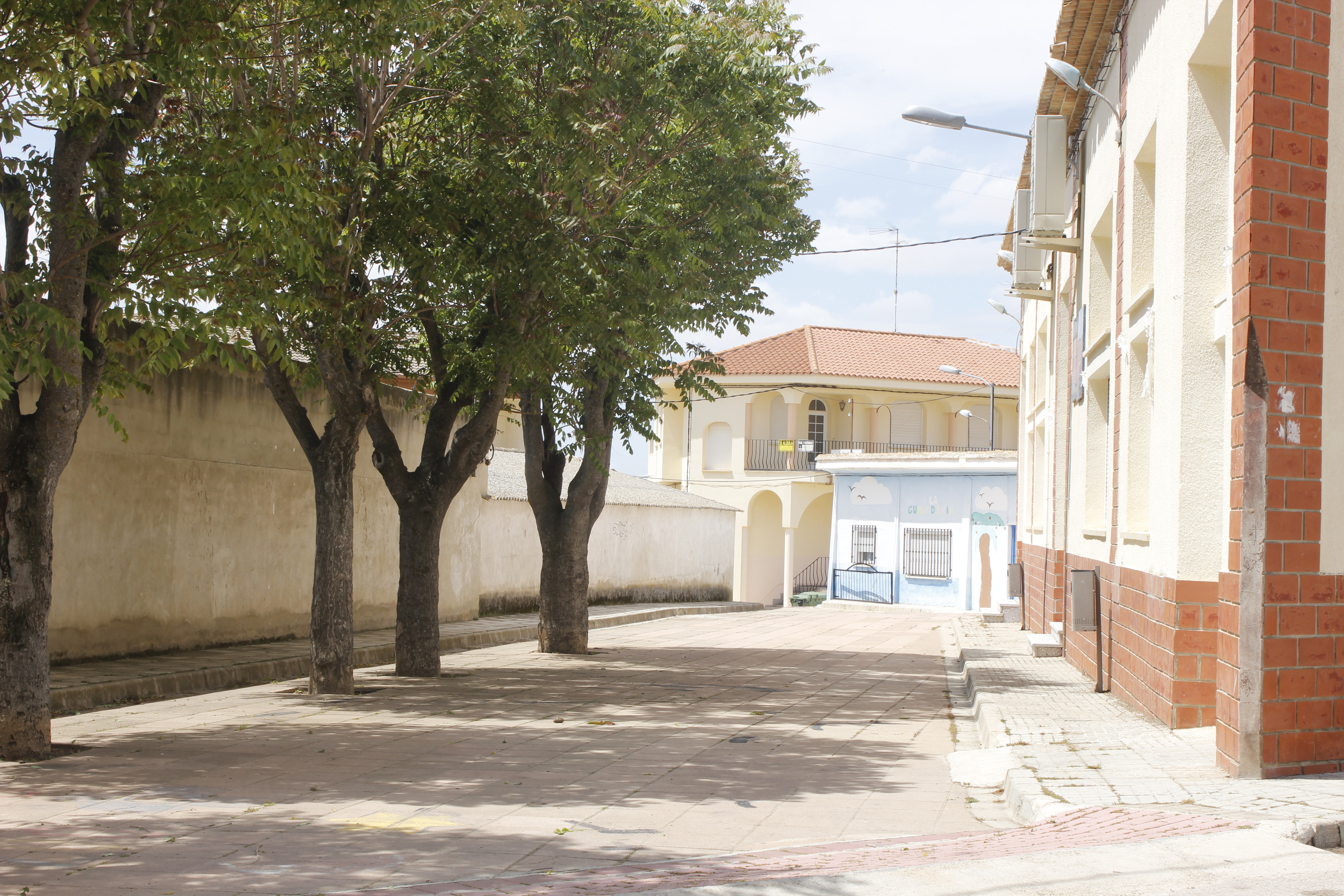

- Coat of arms

- Country: Spain
- Autonomous community: Castile-La Mancha
- Province: Cuenca
- Comarca: Manchuela

Area
  - Total: 30.7 km^{2} (11.9 sq mi)
- Elevation: 637 m (2,090 ft)

Population (2025-01-01)
  - Total: 753
  - Density: 24.5/km^{2} (63.5/sq mi)
- Time zone: UTC+1 (CET)
  - Summer (DST): UTC+2 (CEST)
- Climate: BSk

Abengibre is a municipality in the Province of Albacete, Castile-La Mancha, Spain. It has a population of 972.

== See also ==
- Manchuela
