= La Recueja =

- municipality
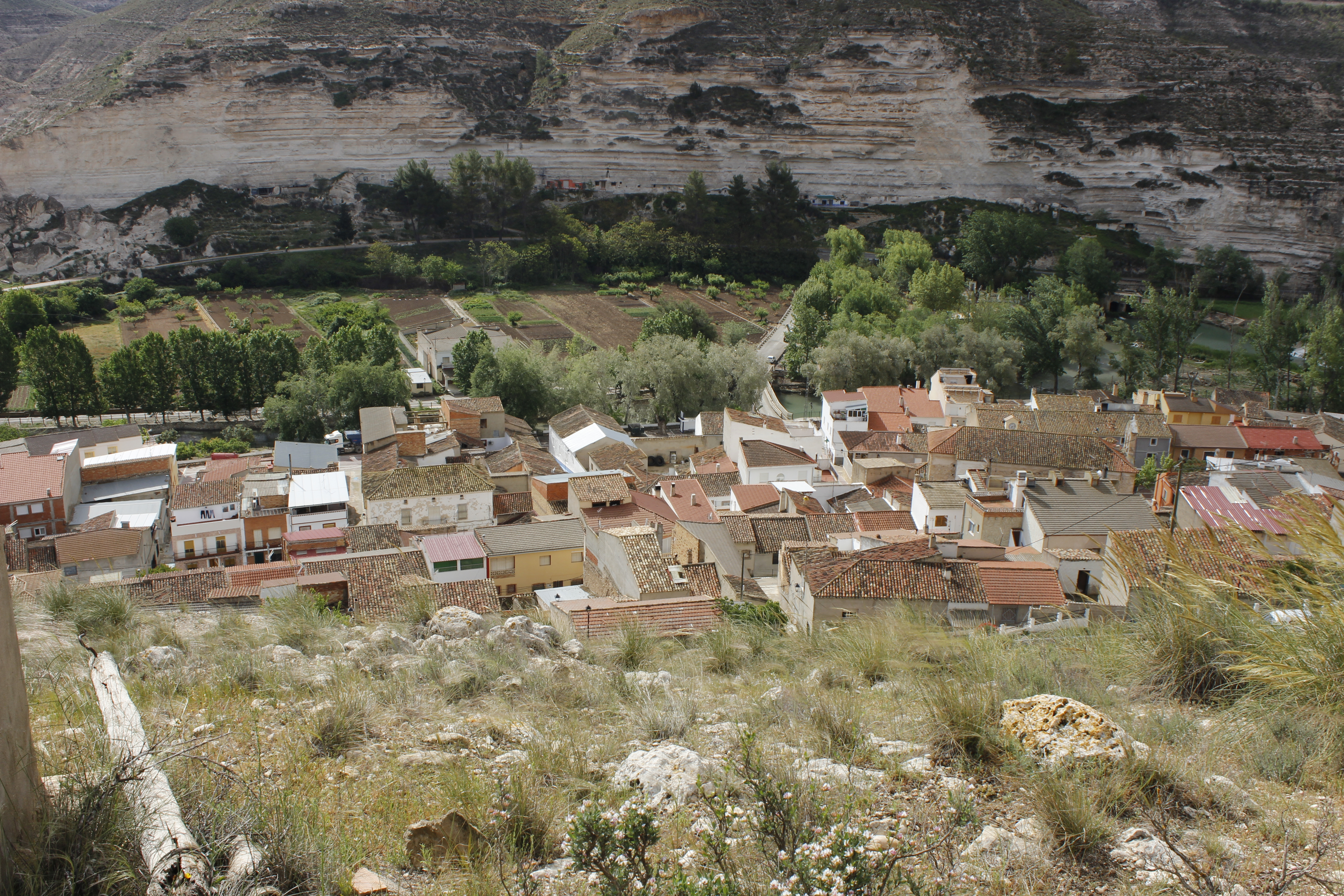
- La Recueja and Júcar valley

- Coat of arms

- Coordinates: 39°11′N 1°29′W
- Country: Spain
- Autonomous community: Castile-La Mancha
- Province: Albacete
- Comarca: Manchuela

Government
  - Mayor: María Llanos Haya López

Area
  - Total: 29.74 km^{2} (11.48 sq mi)
- Elevation: 542 m (1,778 ft)

Population (2025-01-01)
  - Total: 215
  - Density: 7.23/km^{2} (18.7/sq mi)
- Time zone: UTC+1 (CET)
  - Summer (DST): UTC+2 (CEST)
- Postal code: 02249
- Website: www.larecueja.es

La Recueja is a municipality in La Manchuela county, province of Albacete in Castile-La Mancha, Spain. It has a population of 330. It is located in the Júcar riverside.
