= La Pesquera =

- municipality
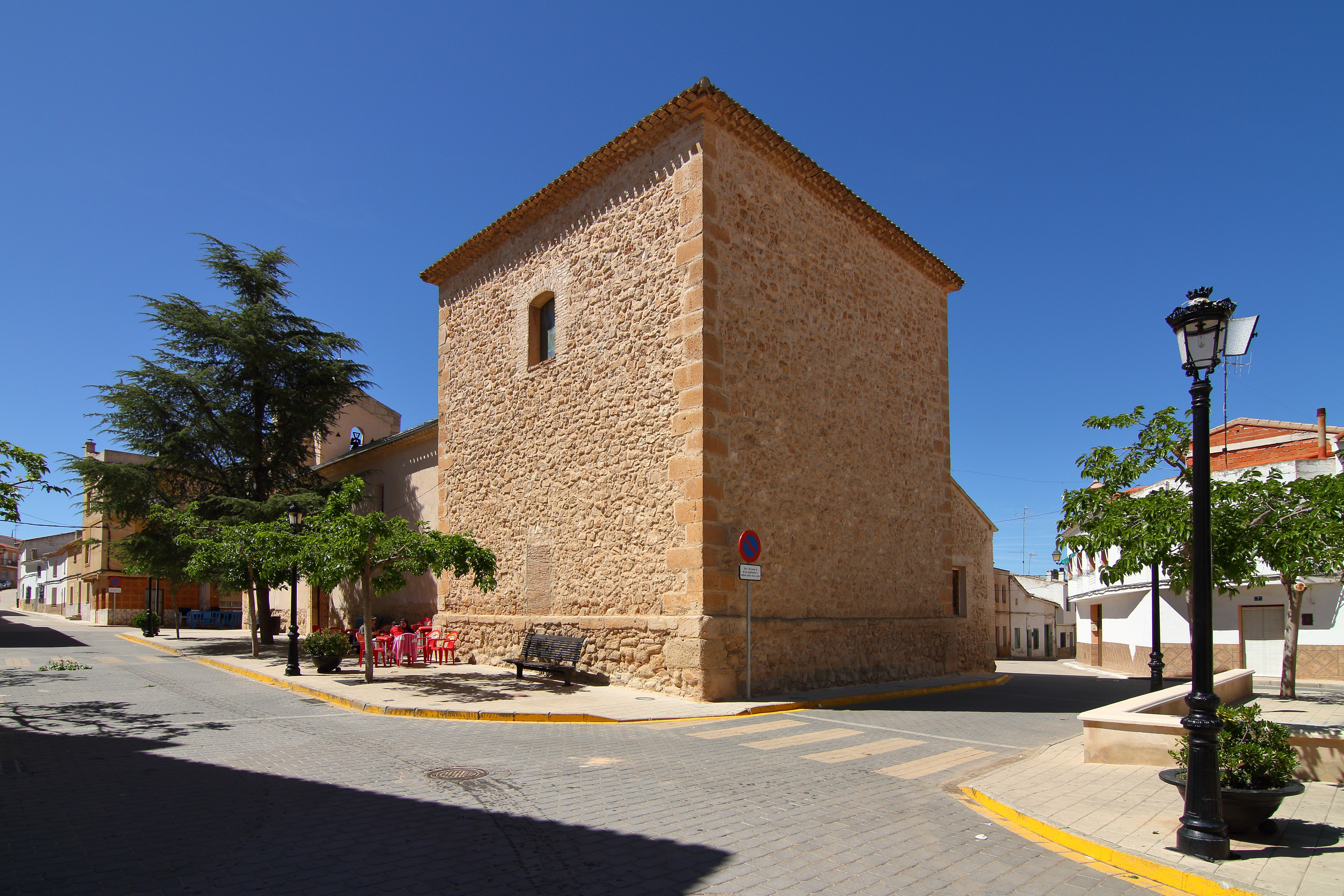
- La Pesquera, Church of Purification of Mary

- Flag Coat of arms

- Location within Spain Location within Castilla-La Mancha
- Coordinates: 39.5833°N 1.5667°W
- Country: Spain
- Autonomous community: Castile-La Mancha
- Province: Cuenca

Area
  - Total: 72 km^{2} (28 sq mi)

Population (2025-01-01)
  - Total: 228
  - Density: 3.2/km^{2} (8.2/sq mi)
- Time zone: UTC+1 (CET)
  - Summer (DST): UTC+2 (CEST)

La Pesquera is a municipality located in the province of Cuenca, Castile-La Mancha, Spain. According to the 2004 census (INE), the municipality has a population of 268 inhabitants.
