= El Picazo =

- municipality
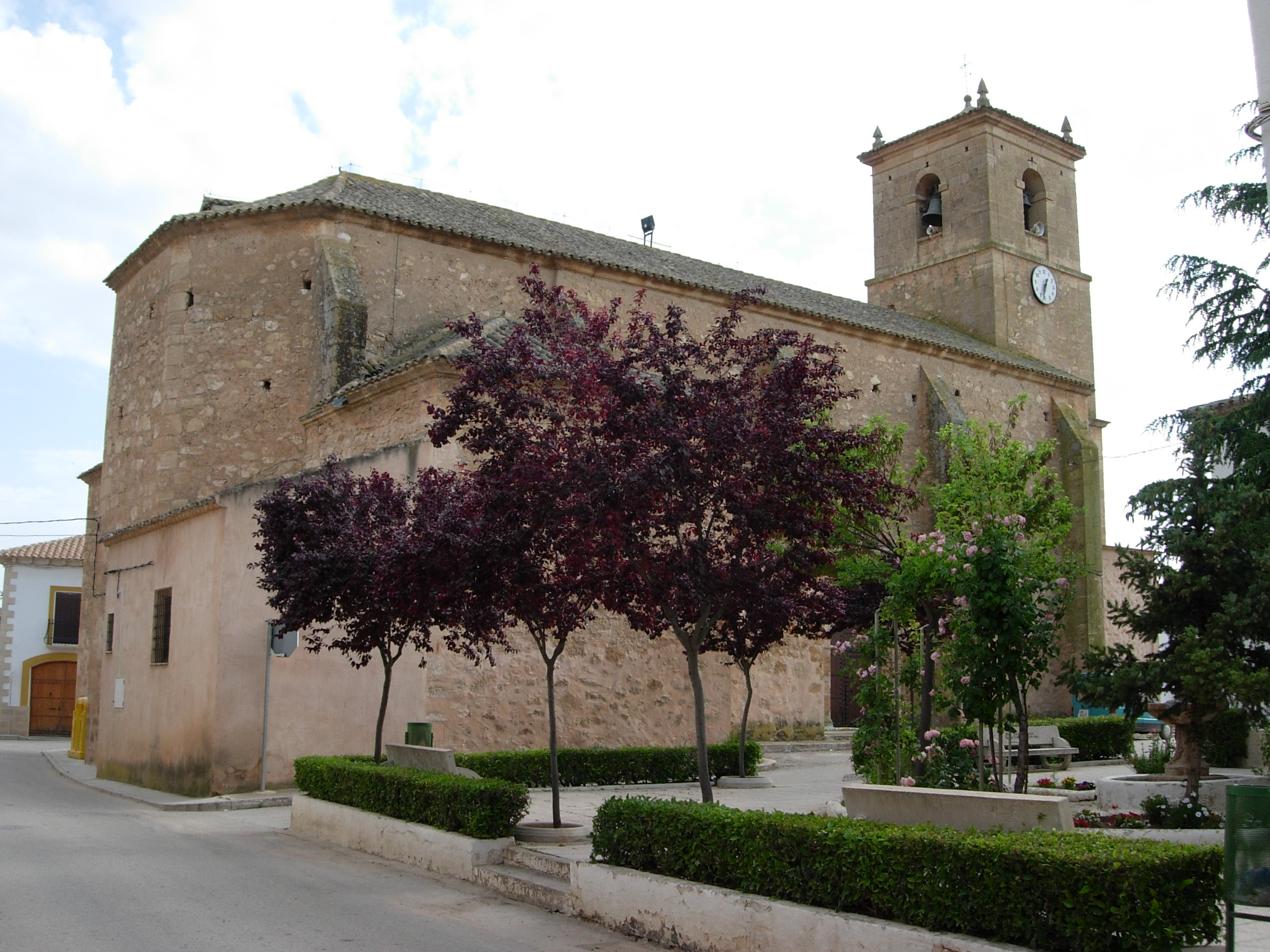
- View of the church of El Picazo in the Town Hall Square

- Flag Coat of arms

- Location within Spain Location within Castilla-La Mancha
- Country: Spain
- Autonomous community: Castile-La Mancha
- Province: Cuenca
- Comarca: Manchuela

Area
  - Total: 24.9 km^{2} (9.6 sq mi)
- Elevation: 698 m (2,290 ft)

Population (2025-01-01)
  - Total: 693
  - Density: 27.8/km^{2} (72.1/sq mi)
- Time zone: UTC+1 (CET)
  - Summer (DST): UTC+2 (CEST)

El Picazo is a municipality located in the province of Cuenca, Castile-La Mancha, Spain. According to the 2006 census (INE), the municipality has a population of 872 inhabitants.

== See also ==
- Manchuela
