= Villagarcía del Llano =

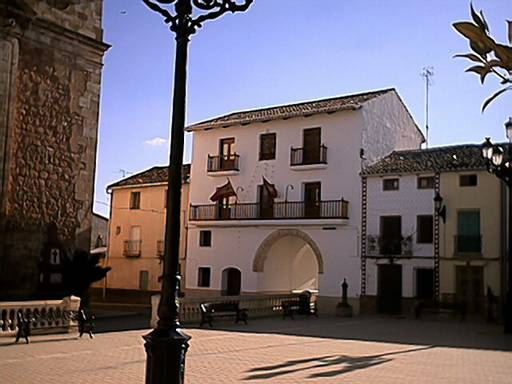
- Town hall

- Coat of arms

- Location of Villagarcía del Llano within Spain
- Coordinates: 39°19′36.3″N 1°50′47.2″W
- Country: Spain
- Autonomous community: Castile-La Mancha
- Province: Cuenca
- Comarca: Manchuela conquense

Government
  - Mayor: Juan Francisco García Juncos (PP)

Area
  - Total: 117 km^{2} (45 sq mi)

Population (2025-01-01)
  - Total: 763
  - Density: 6.52/km^{2} (16.9/sq mi)
- Time zone: UTC+1 (CET)
  - Summer (DST): UTC+2 (CEST)

Villagarcía del Llano is a municipality located in the province of Cuenca, Castile-La Mancha, Spain. According to the 2004 census (INE), the municipality has a population of 939 inhabitants.
