= Casasimarro =

- Municipality
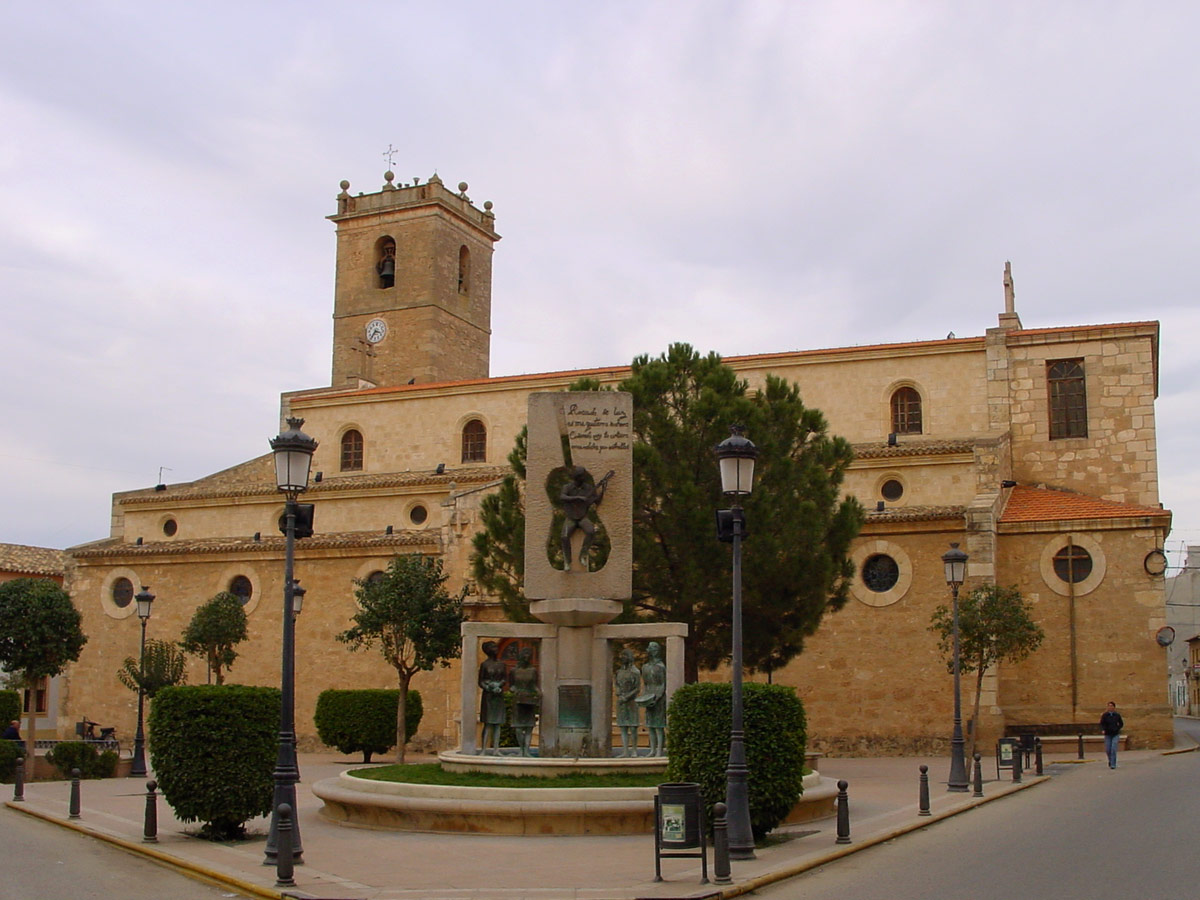

- Flag Coat of arms

- Location within Spain Location within Castilla-La Mancha
- Coordinates: 39°22′N 2°02′W
- Country: Spain
- Autonomous community: Castile-La Mancha
- Province: Cuenca

Population (2025-01-01)
  - Total: 3,177
- Time zone: UTC+1 (CET)
  - Summer (DST): UTC+2 (CEST)

Casasimarro is a municipality in the Province of Cuenca, in the autonomous community of Castile-La Mancha, Spain.

The area has an elevation of 750 metres (2,460 ft) and a continental climate, 40 °C (104 °F) in summer and −10 °C (14 °F) in winter. As of 2003, the municipality had a population of just over 3,000. The area of Casasimarro is about 50 km.[2]

The local economy is based on agriculture and cattle raising, with the main produce being mushrooms, cereals, wine and olive oil. Industries include guitar- and carpet-making.

Casasimarro is a relatively new municipality. The oldest document that acknowledges it, is Felipe II's "Relación Topográfica" in 1598. This document states the foundation of a village of the "House of the Simarros" ("Casa de los Simarro") in 1470.
