= San Nicolás, Requena =

Church in Requena, Spain

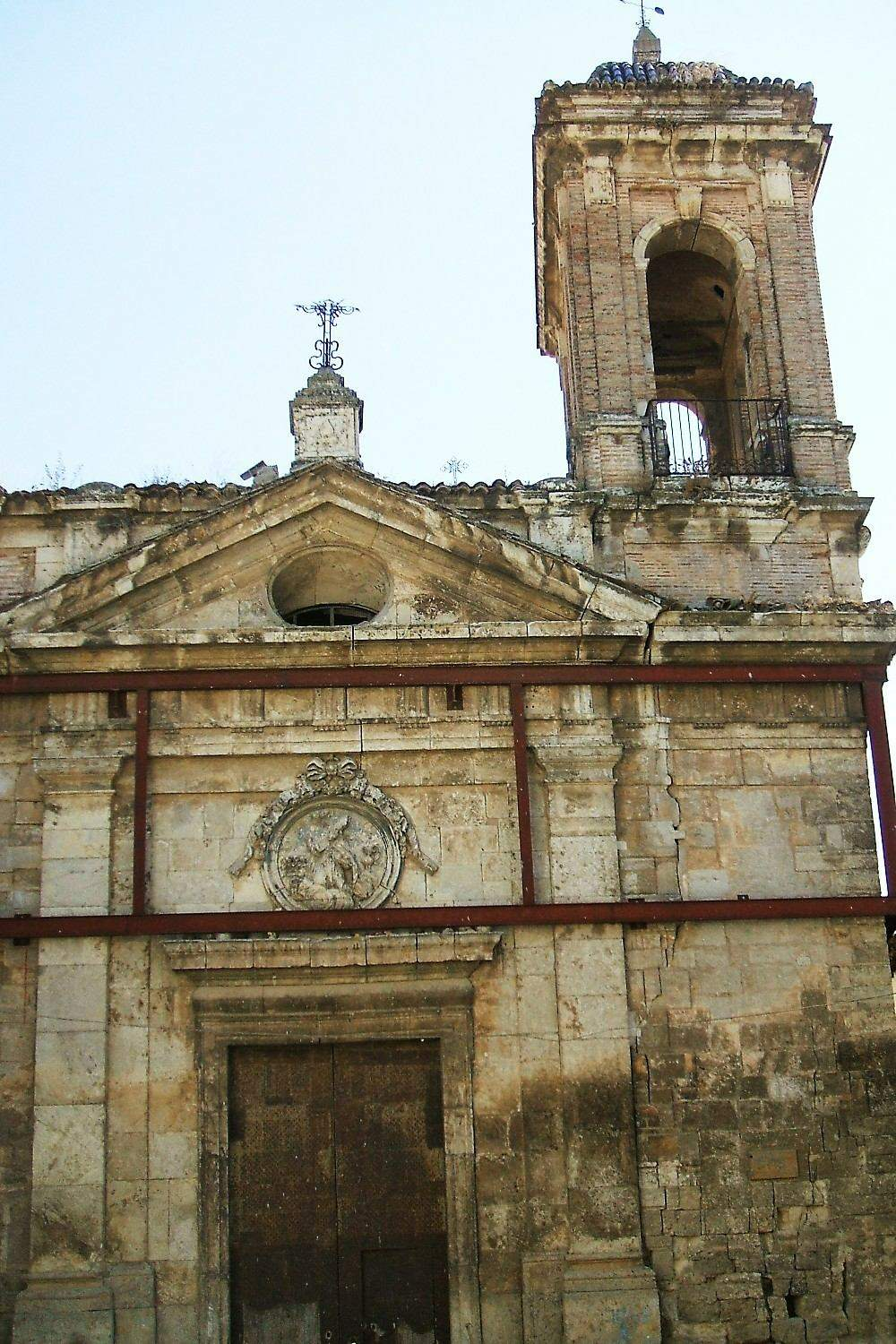
A view of the church

San Nicolás (St Nicholas) is Neoclassic-style, Roman Catholic church located in the Plaza de San Nicolás in Requena, province of Valencia, Spain. The church is dedicated to San Nicolás de Bari.

The church was erected in the late 14th century, contemporary will the San Salvador and Santa María. In 1706, the church façade was damaged during the siege of the town during the War of the Spanish Succession. This led to a refurbishment of the entire church, and a neoclassic façade, based on a design by Padre Tosca. The dome was completed in 1788. The flanks of the church maintain gothic buttresses. The church was declared Bien de interes cultural in 2008. the church is being restored.
