= Casas de Sotos =

Coordinates: 39°20′N 1°04′W

- Interactive map of Casas de Sotos
- Country: Spain
- Province: Valencia
- Municipality: Requena
- Comarca: Requena-Utiel

Population (2015)
  - Total: 19

Casas de Sotos is a village in Valencia, Spain. It is part of the municipality of Requena and belongs to the comarca Requena-Utiel.

It is located less than 2 km away from Los Pedrones.
