= María Teresa Oller =

Spanish composer and folklorist

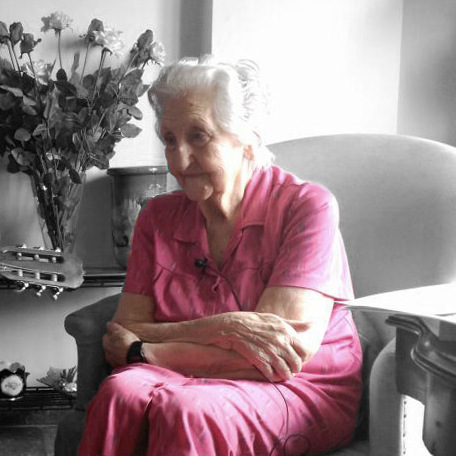
- (2015)
- Born: María Teresa Oller Benlloch; 1920; Valencia, Spain
- Died: 2 September 2018 (aged 97)
- Occupations: composer; folklorist
- Organization: Real Academia de Bellas Artes de San Carlos de Valencia
- Awards: Joaquín Rodrigo Prize

María Teresa Oller (1920 – 2 September 2018) was a Spanish composer and folklorist of the Valencian Community. Since the 1950s, she carried out extensive fieldwork to collect traditional Valencian music, highlight it, and make it known in numerous publications. Oller was a member of the Real Academia de Bellas Artes de San Carlos de Valencia.

== Biography ==
María Teresa Oller Benlloch was born in Valencia in 1920.

From a very young age, she developed an interest in popular music. She was attracted to the music she heard on the street, mainly the party music performed by the dulzaina and the tabalet at city festivities as well as the street songs like the ones sung by the street sweeper, the carpenter, or those sung by children. Likewise, during her stays with her family in Alcoy, she became aware of popular rural music.

She studied at the Conservatori Superior de Música Joaquín Rodrigo and obtained the "Extraordinary Prize" in the disciplines of piano and composition. Manuel Palau was her teacher in composition, choir and orchestra conducting, musicology, and music pedagogy, and she became a favorite disciple. She followed Palau's advice and furthered her music studies with Professor Ernet Jarnack, with the Walker Wagenheim Orchestra and with the choral specialist, Rafael Benedito. In 1954, she obtained a grant from the Diputación de Valencia to perfect her composition studies.

Highlights of her early works include the research carried out in the Vall d'Albaida region where Oller visited all the towns while collecting songs such as the fandango of El Palomar or the dances of Bèlgida. She also did extensive work in the Ribera Alta comarca documenting the music of Algemesí. The collection of dances of the Porrots of Silla is also from that time. She researched and transcribed polyphonies from the 16th, 17th, and 18th centuries in the archives of the Valencia Cathedral and in the archives of the Real Colegio Seminario del Corpus Christi.

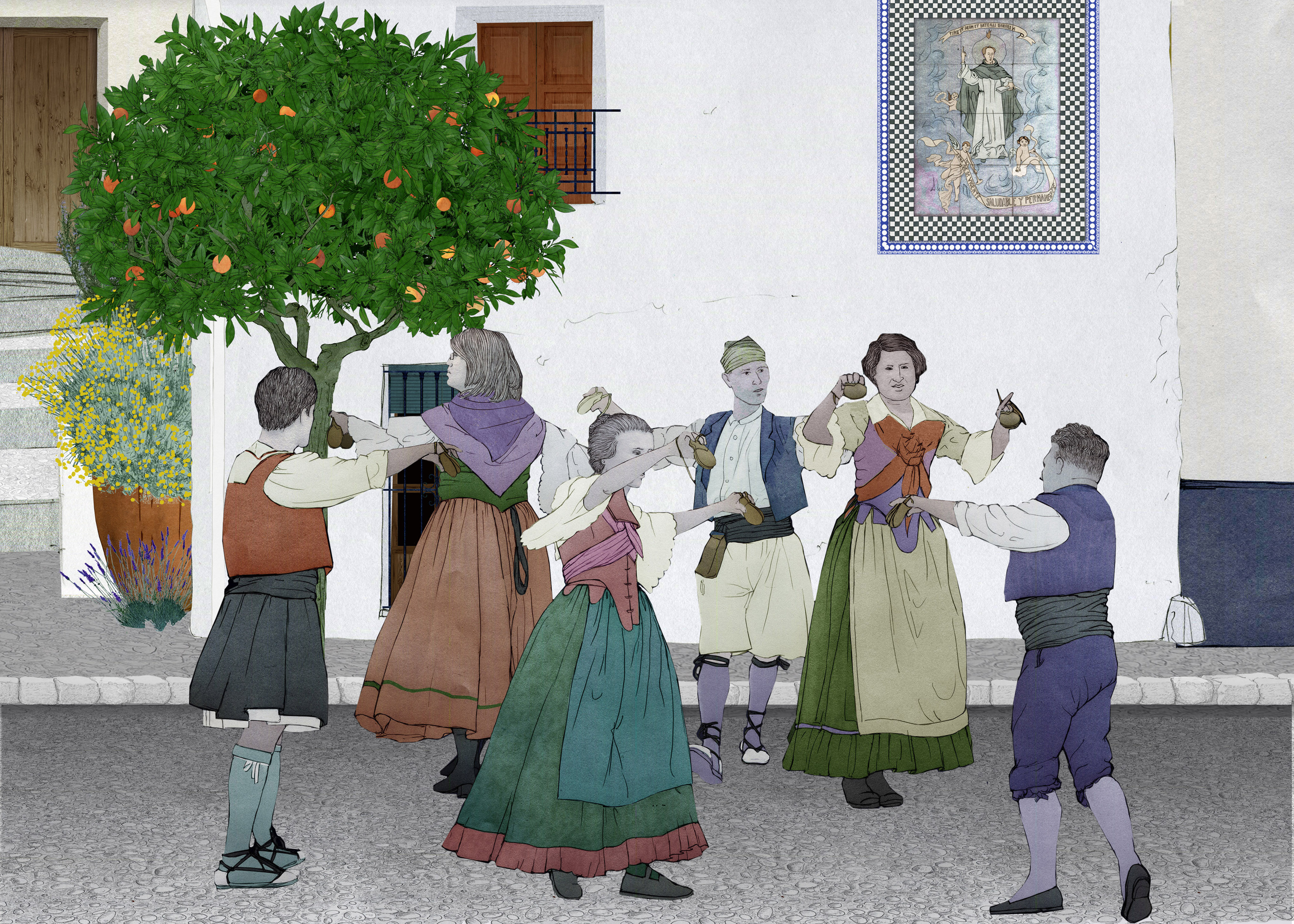
Traditional Valencian dance (Valencian Museum of Ethnology)

From 1974, she began working exclusively as a transcriber with a team of compilers coordinated by musicologist Salvador Seguí Pérez, which also included Fermín Pardo, Sebastián Garrido, Ricardo Pitarch, and José Luis López. The Fundación Juan March financed this group through a grant made to the musicologist Salvador Seguí to travel to the different comarques of the province of Valencia to collect songs and melodies. Oller was in charge of touring the villages of the Los Serranos, Camp de Túria, Vall d'Albaida, and Horta de Gandia. In 1976, the Institució Alfons el Magnànim - Centre Valencià d'Estudis i d'Investigació, of which the Cancionero Musical de la provincia de Valencia (Folk Music Section of the Valencian Institute of Ethnology) was a part, decided to help the group to expand their research with an interest in making a traditional musical songbook of Castelló and Valencia and thus complete the task developed in recent years by Salvador Seguí with the publication of the Cançoner de la província d'Alacant (Songbook of the province of Alicante). As a culmination of all the work of this period, in 1980, the Institució Alfons el Magnànim published the Cancionero Musical de la provincia de Valencia (Musical Songbook of the province of Valencia) in which Oller collaborated. During this period, the team collected materials, texts and mayos (songs) tunes from many towns in the Requena-Utiel, Valle de Ayora, some localities in the Horta of Valencia, the Serrania del Túria, and the Rincón de Ademuz.

In 1988, Oller and Pardo teamed up again to present to the Institució Valenciana d'Estudis i Investigació a monographic project dedicated to the singing of the mayos in the Valencian comarques. The institution granted them financial aid that made it possible to increase the collection of texts and melodies that Oller transcribed and analyzed. Oller's research projects on Valencian musical traditions, such as the Rosario de la aurora, have been an important source of recovery and documentation of Valencian musical culture.

Oller participated in numerous publications related to Cant valencià d'estil (Valencian style singing) as well as in congresses and conferences. She was a contributor to the newspaper Levante where she published various research papers and reviews of music criticism of concerts and operas held in Valencia. Oller died on September 2, 2018, at the age of 97.

== Awards and honours ==
In 1969, Oller was awarded the Joaquín Rodrigo Prize for the work Veus del blau i del grisenc (Voices of blue and grey), for mixed choir, where she set to music three poems by Maria Ibars i Ibars: "Mar dormida", "Plany", and "Cançoneta del Montgó", published in 1974.

== Selected works ==
- Armiñana, Rosa; Oller, María Teresa. Voces de un pueblo : Bechí. Valencia: Institut d'Estudis Valencians, 1983.
- Oller, María Teresa; Palau, Manuel. Madrigales y canciones polifónicas : autores anónimos de los siglos XVI y XVII: Archivo de la S. I. M. Catedral de. [Valencia]: Instituto Valenciano de Musicología, 1958.
- Oller, María Teresa. Las canciones de trilla del arroz en la valenciana Ribera del Júcar. Zaragoza: Institución "Fernando el Católico", 1969.
- Oller, María Teresa. La música coral valenciana. Madrid: Sociedad Española de Acústica, [can. 1972].
- Oller, María Teresa; Calatayud, Vicent Ramon. Contar y cantar : recoge de narraciones y canciones populares valencianas. Valencia: Lo Rat Penado, D.L. 1994.
- Oller, María Teresa. Panorámica de la canço i la dansa tradicional : conferencia pronunciada amb motiu de la clausura del curs academic 1996-97. Madrid: Lo Rat Penat, 1998.
- Oller, María Teresa; Martí, Enric. Panorámica de la música y danza tradicional valenciana.. [Valencia]: Universidad Politécnica, D.L. 1998.
- Oller, María Teresa. Cançons narratives valencianes. Valencia: Lo Rat Penat, 2000.
- Bartual, Rosa; Oller, María Teresa; Madrid, Jesús A. L'albà de l'Alcora. Valencia: Lo Rat Penat, 2003.
- Oller, María Teresa. La navidad en Valencia. Valencia: Aula de Cultura Tradicional Valenciana, Universidad Politécnica de Valencia, D.L. 2004.
- Oller, María Teresa. Canciones tradicionales valencianas infantiles y de cuna. Valencia: Aula de Cultura Tradicional Valenciana, Universidad Politécnica de Valencia, [2006].
- Oller, María Teresa. La canción campesina en el folclore musical valenciano. Valencia: Aula de Cultura Tradicional Valenciana, Universidad Politécnica de València, [2007].
- Oller, María Teresa; Bartual, Rosa. Tot menos apurarse : canciones humóristicas valencianes. [Valencia]: Aula de Cultura Tradicional Valenciana, Universidad Politécnica de Valencia, D.L. 2007..
- Oller, María Teresa; Martí, Enric. Panorámica de la música y danza tradicional valenciana.. [Valencia]: Aula Enric Martí de Cultura Tradicional Valenciana, Universidad Politécnica de Valrncia, D.L. 2007.
- Oller, María Teresa. Los "gozos" en la tradición musical del pueblo valenciano. Valencia: Aula Enric Martí de Cultura Tradicional Valenciana, Universitat Politècnica de València, D.L. 2009.
- Oller, María Teresa. La Pasión de Jesús de Nazareth en la canción tradicional valenciana. Valencia: Aula Enric Martí de Cultura Tradicional Valenciana, Universidad Politécnica de Valencia, [2010].
- Oller, María Teresa. Canciones tradicionales valencianas, pascueras. Valencia: Aula Enric Martí de Cultura Tradicional Valenciana, Universidad Politécnica de Valencia, [2011].
- Oller, María Teresa. Frases, sentències i dites valencianes. Valencia: Lo Rat Penat, D.L. 2011.
- Pardo, Fermín; Oller, María Teresa. Los mayos en el Campo de Requena-Utiel y otras comarcas valencianas. [Requena]: Centro de Estudios Requenenses, D.L. 1997.
- Seguí, Salvador; Oller, María Teresa; Pardo, Fermín; Jesús-María, José A. Danzas de Titaguas. Valencia: Sección Folclore Musical. Instituto de Etnología Valenciana. Institución Alfons el Magnánimo, 1979 (Cuadernos de música folclórica valenciana. Segunda época; 2).
- Seguí, Salvador; Oller, María Teresa; López, José Luis; Pardo, Fermín; Garrido, Sebastián. Cancionero musical de la provincia de Valencia. Valencia: Institución Alfonso el Magnánimo, 1980.
