= Fermín Pardo Pardo =

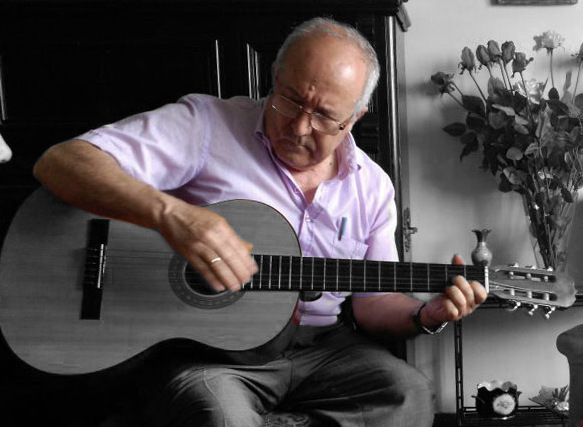
- Fermín Pardo

Background information
- Born: 20 April 1945 (age 79); Requena, Valencia
- Occupation: Folklorist
- Fermín Pardo Pardo's voice Recorded 17 October 2016 (in Spanish)

Fermín Pardo Pardo (born 20 April 1945) is a Spanish folklore researcher, and is one of the most notable scholars of traditional music in the Land of Valencia.

Pardo was born in Hortunas, Requena. In 1974 he joined a research group under the coordination of Salvador Seguí Pérez who collected folk songs throughout the Province of Valencia. In 1976, with the patronage of Institució Alfons el Magnànim, the collection was completed with records from the whole Land of Valencia.

Throughout his life, he has collected about 11,700 musical pieces recorded in more than 300 cassette tapes. Since 2008, his collection is kept in Requena's Archive.
