= Los Cojos =

Coordinates: 39.4207°N 1.3068°W

- Interactive map of Los Cojos
- Country: Spain
- Province: Valencia
- Municipality: Requena
- Comarca: Requena-Utiel

Population (2015)
  - Total: 113

Los Cojos is a village in Valencia, Spain. It is part of the municipality of Requena and belongs to the comarca Requena-Utiel.
