= Los Duques =

Coordinates: 39.4339°N 1.2057°W

- Interactive map of Los Duques
- Country: Spain
- Province: Valencia
- Municipality: Requena
- Comarca: Requena-Utiel

Population (2022)
  - Total: 92

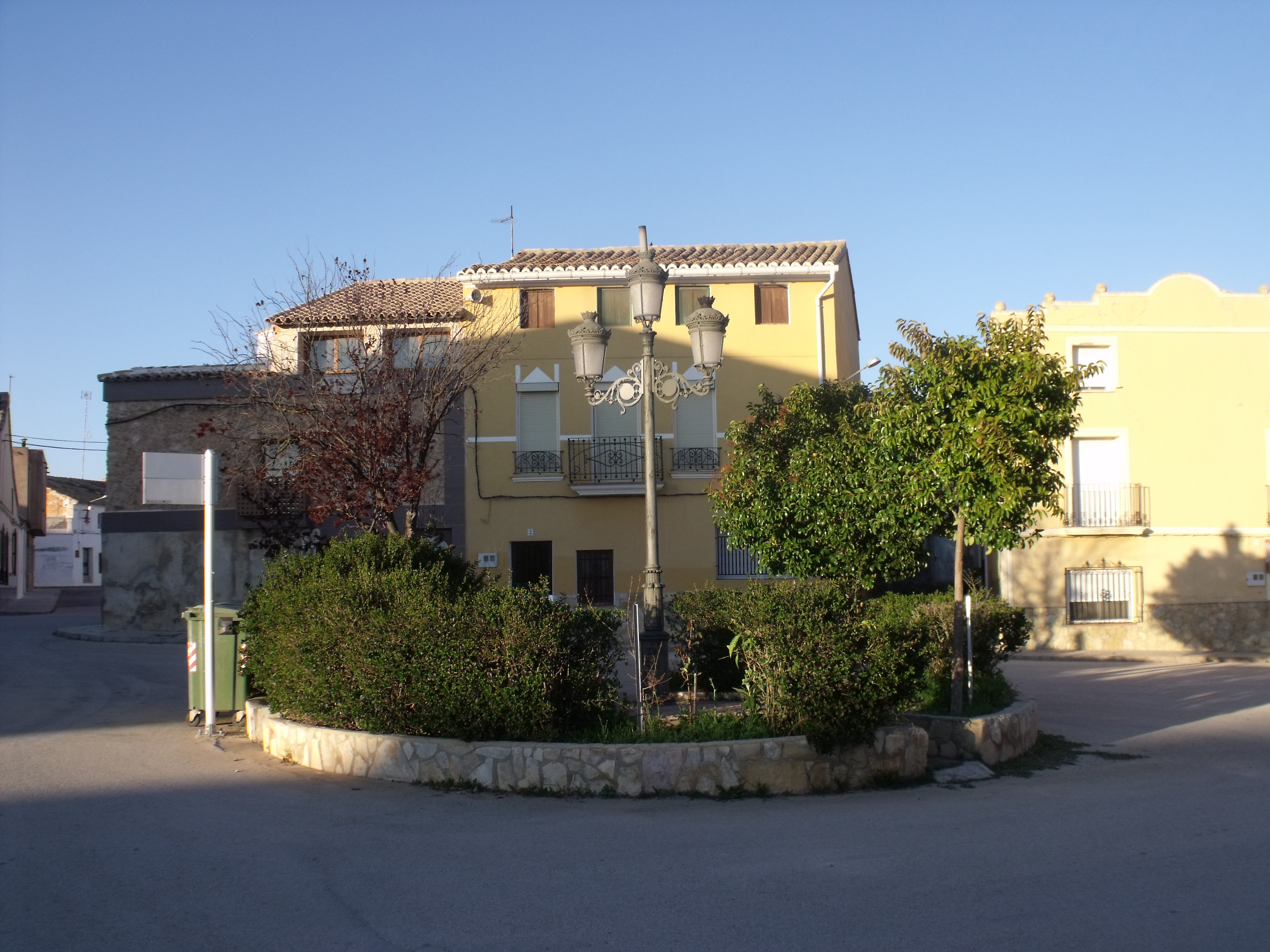
Los Duques 14

Los Duques is a village in Valencia, Spain. It is part of the municipality of Requena. In January 2022, its registered population was 92 inhabitants.
