= Penén de Albosa =

Coordinates: 39.4036°N 1.2764°W

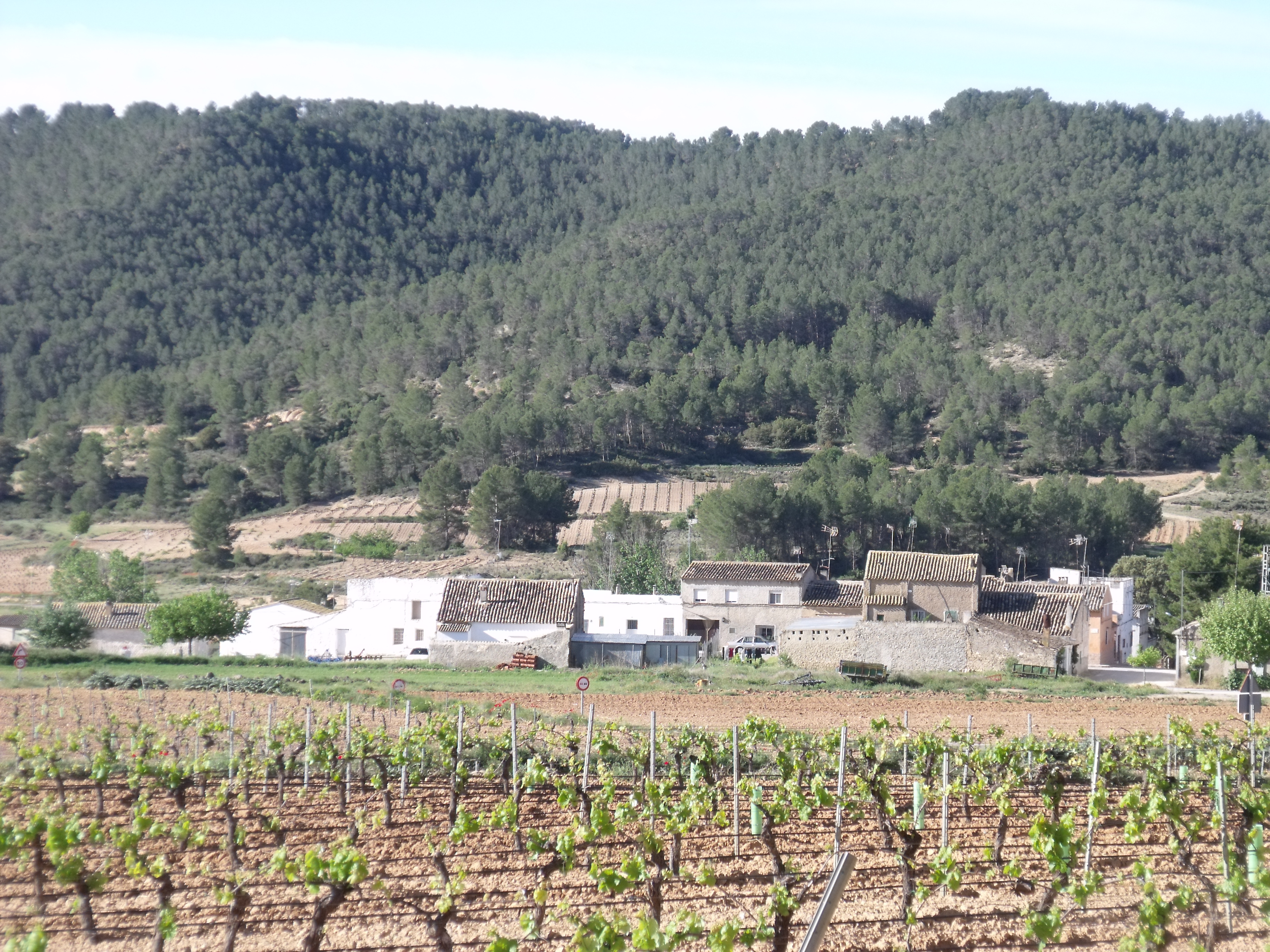
- General view of Penén de Albosa
- Interactive map of Penén de Albosa
- Country: Spain
- Province: Valencia
- Municipality: Requena
- Comarca: Requena-Utiel

Population (2015)
  - Total: 23

Penén de Albosa is a village in Valencia, Spain. It is part of the municipality of Requena and belongs to the comarca Requena-Utiel.
