= Barrio Arroyo =

Coordinates: 39°31′N 1°10′W

Barrio Arroyo Villalefa
- Interactive map of Barrio Arroyo
- Country: Spain
- Province: Valencia
- Municipality: Requena
- Comarca: Requena-Utiel

Population (2015)
  - Total: 75

Barrio Arroyo is a village in Valencia, Spain. It is part of the municipality of Requena and belongs to the comarca Requena-Utiel.
