= Los Isidros =

Coordinates: 39°25′N 1°17′W

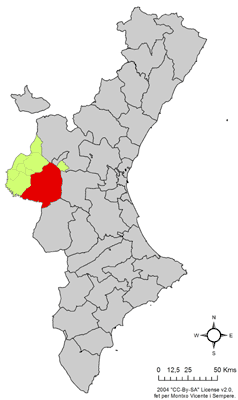
- Requena in the Valencian Community
- Interactive map of Los Isidros
- Country: Spain
- Province: Valencia
- Municipality: Requena
- Comarca: Requena-Utiel

Population (2015)
  - Total: 337

Los Isidros is a village in Valencia, Spain. It is part of the municipality of Requena.
