= Calderón (disambiguation) =

Calderón is a Spanish surname.

Calderón may also refer to:

- Calderón (Requena), a village in Valencia, Spain
- Calderón, Quito, a rural parish of Quito Canton, Pichincha Province, Ecuador
- Calderón River, in Mexico
- Vicente Calderón Stadium, Argazuela, Madrid, Spain
