= Casas de Cuadra =

Coordinates: 39.4519°N 1.2542°W

- Interactive map of Casas de Cuadra
- Country: Spain
- Province: Valencia
- Municipality: Requena
- Comarca: Requena-Utiel

Population (2015)
  - Total: 13

Casas de Cuadra is a village in Valencia, Spain. It is part of the municipality of Requena and belongs to the comarca Requena-Utiel.

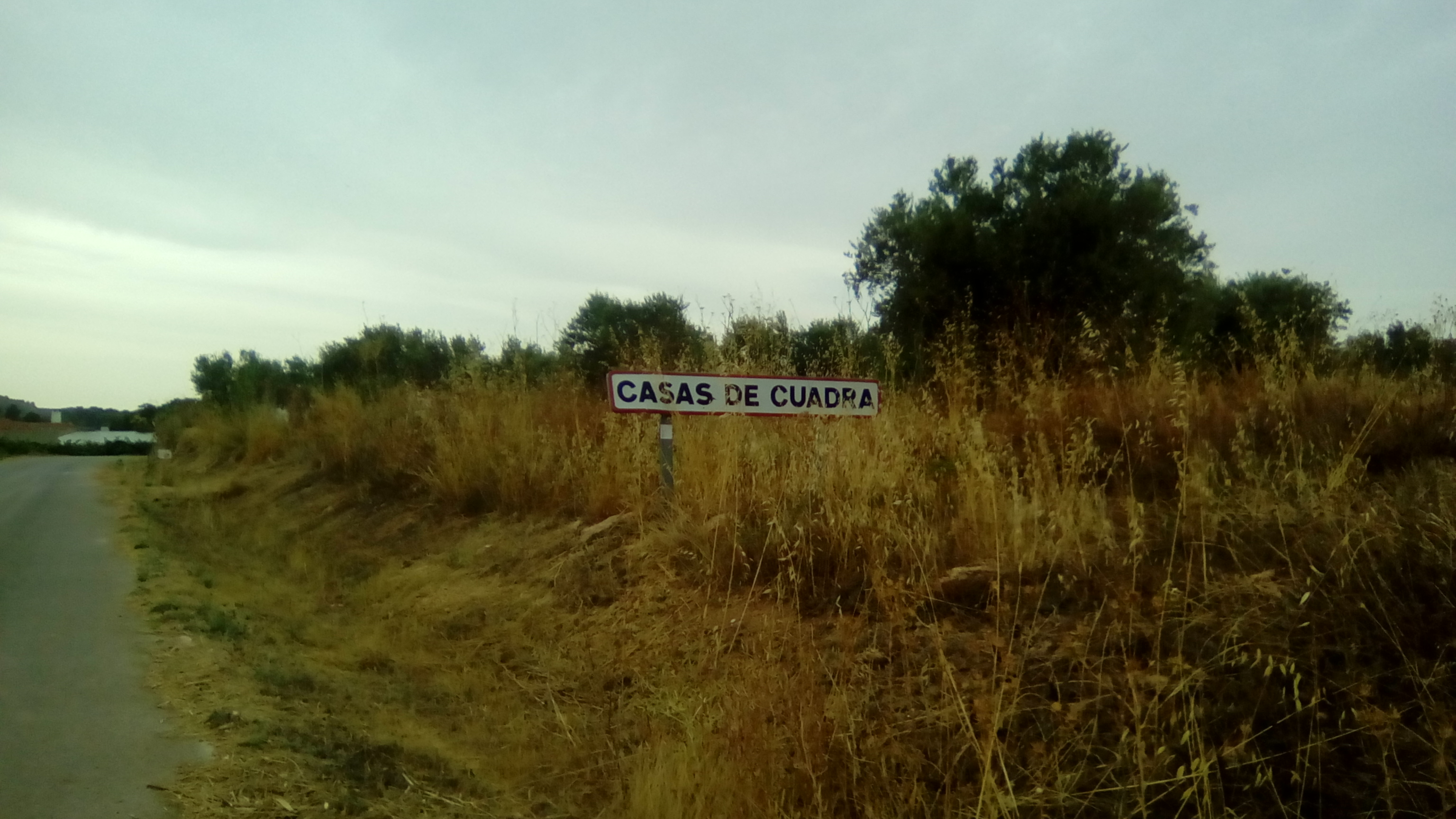
Village sign

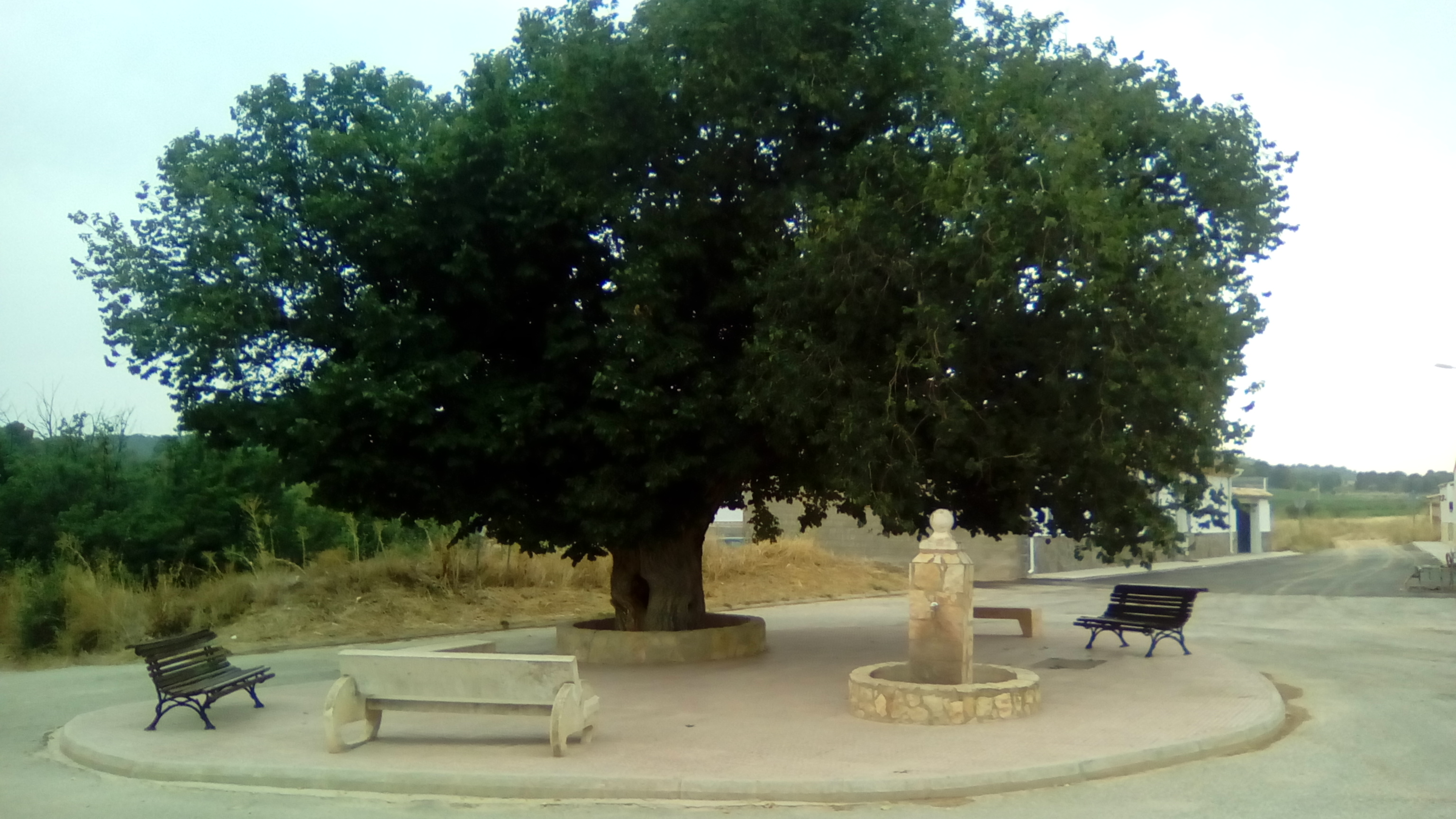
Fountain and tree

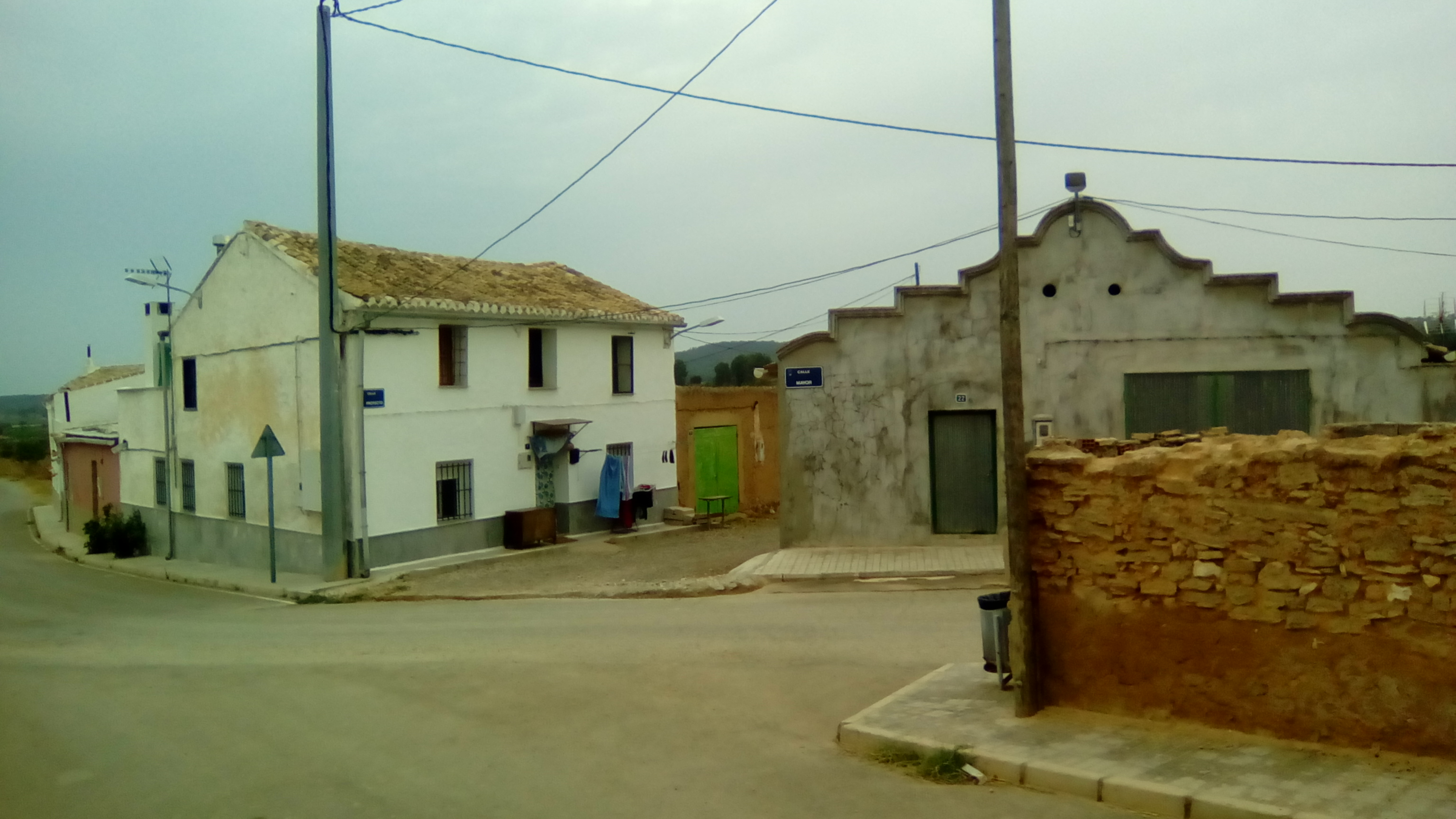
Houses
