= El Pontón =

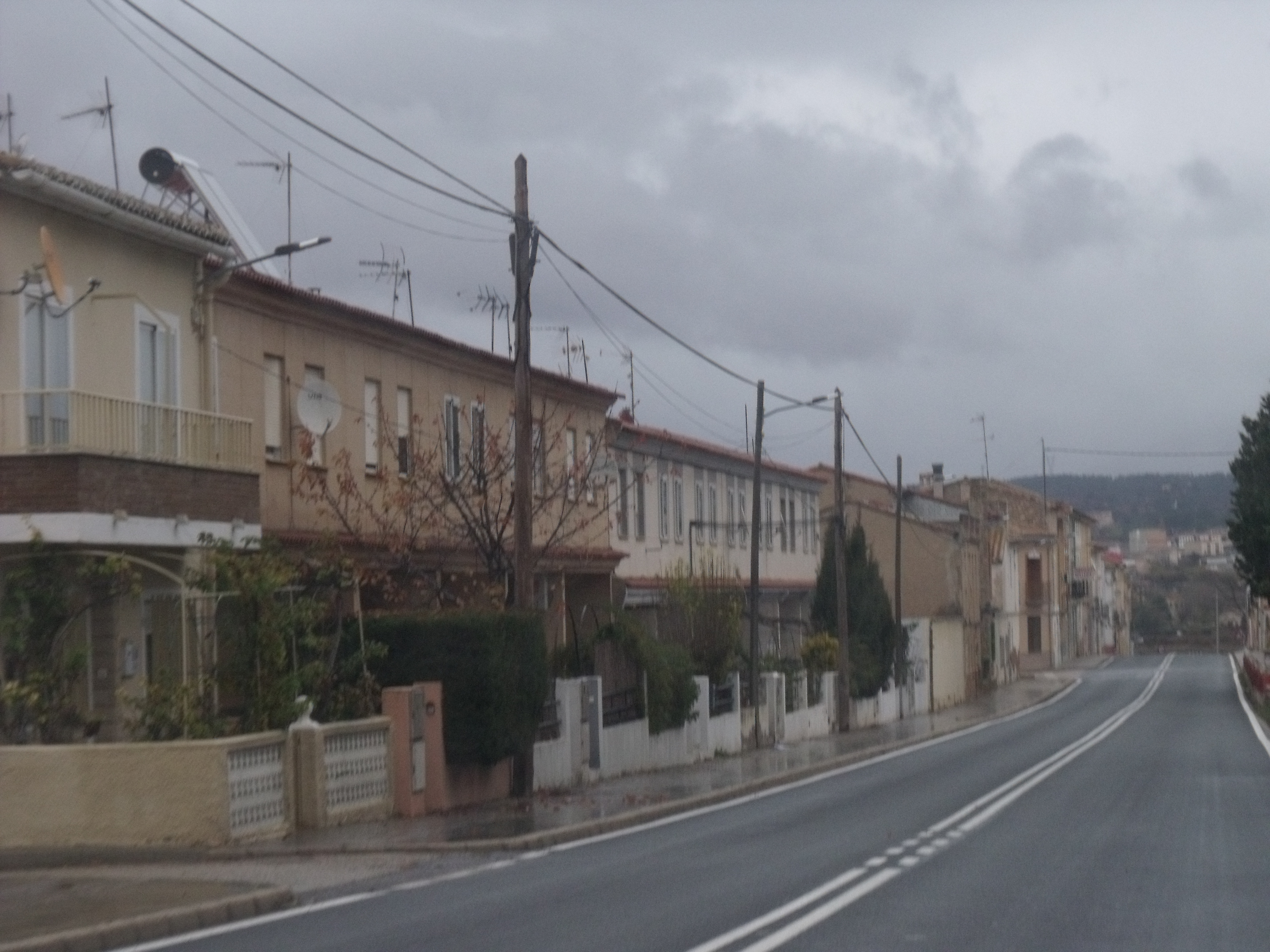

- Location in Spain
- Coordinates: 39.476°N 1.122°W
- Country: Spain
- Province: Valencia
- Municipality: Requena
- Comarca: Requena-Utiel

Population (2015)
  - Total: 378

El Pontón is a village in Valencia, Spain. It is part of the municipality of Requena and belongs to the comarca Requena-Utiel.
