= Las Nogueras =

Coordinates: 39.5855°N 1.0848°W

- Interactive map of Las Nogueras
- Country: Spain
- Province: Valencia
- Municipality: Requena
- Comarca: Requena-Utiel

Population (2015)
  - Total: 16

Las Nogueras is a village in Valencia, Spain. It is part of the municipality of Requena and belongs to the comarca Requena-Utiel.
