= Casas de Eufemia =

Coordinates: 39.4493°N 1.2118°W

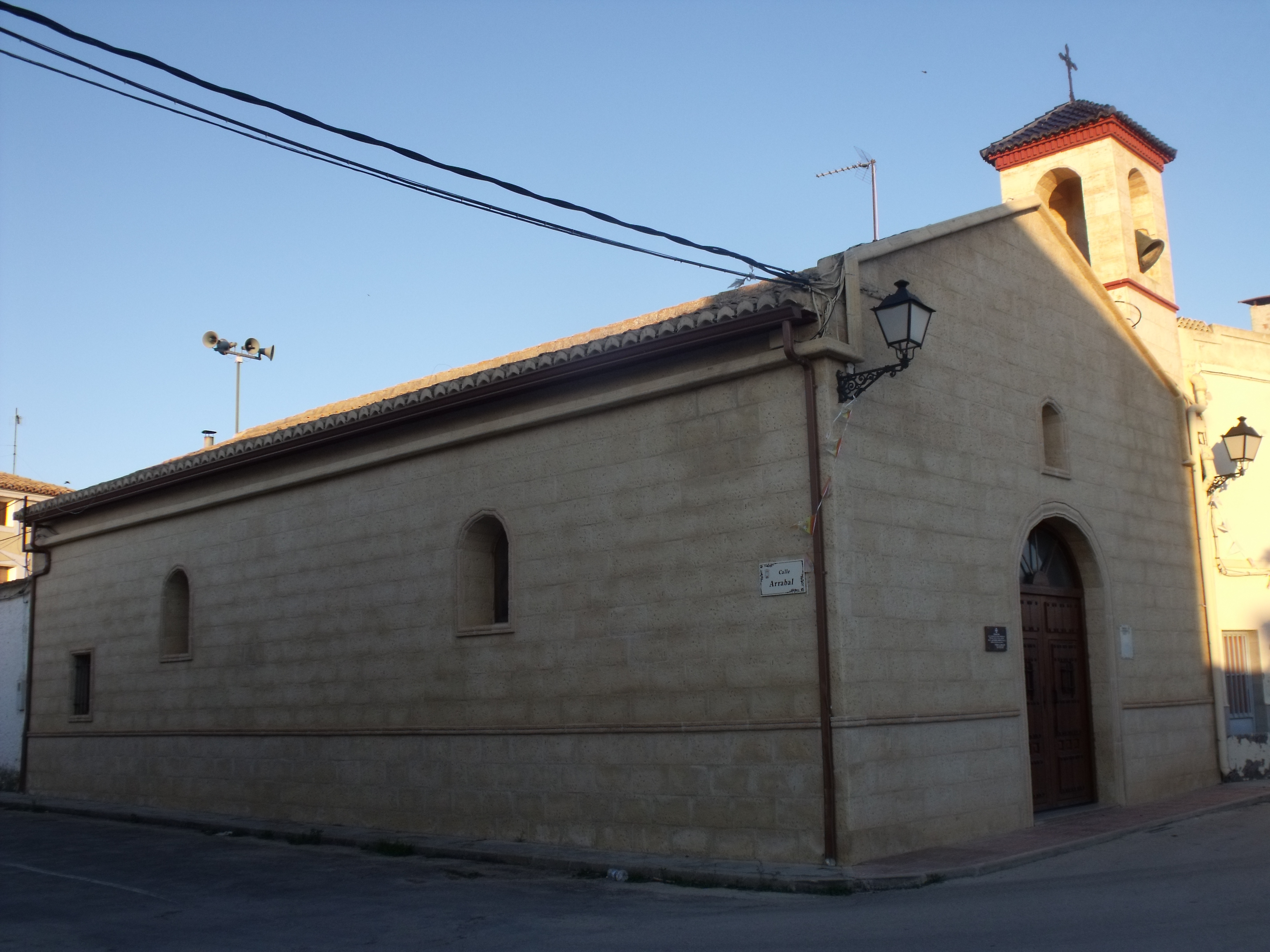
- Interactive map of Casas de Eufemia
- Country: Spain
- Province: Valencia
- Municipality: Requena
- Comarca: Requena-Utiel

Population (2020)
  - Total: 116

Casas de Eufemia is a village in Valencia, Spain. It is part of the municipality of Requena and belongs to the comarca Requena-Utiel.
