= Roma (Requena) =

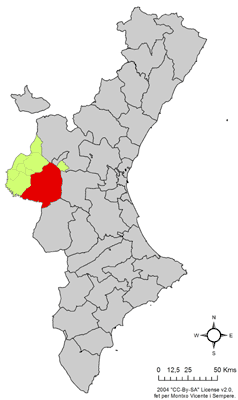
- Roma (Requena)
- Interactive map of Roma
- Country: Spain
- Province: Valencia
- Municipality: Requena
- Comarca: Requena-Utiel

Population (2015)
  - Total: 80

Roma is a village in Valencia, Spain. It is part of the municipality of Requena and belongs to the comarca Requena-Utiel.
