= Villar de Olmos =

Coordinates: 39°36′N 1°04′W

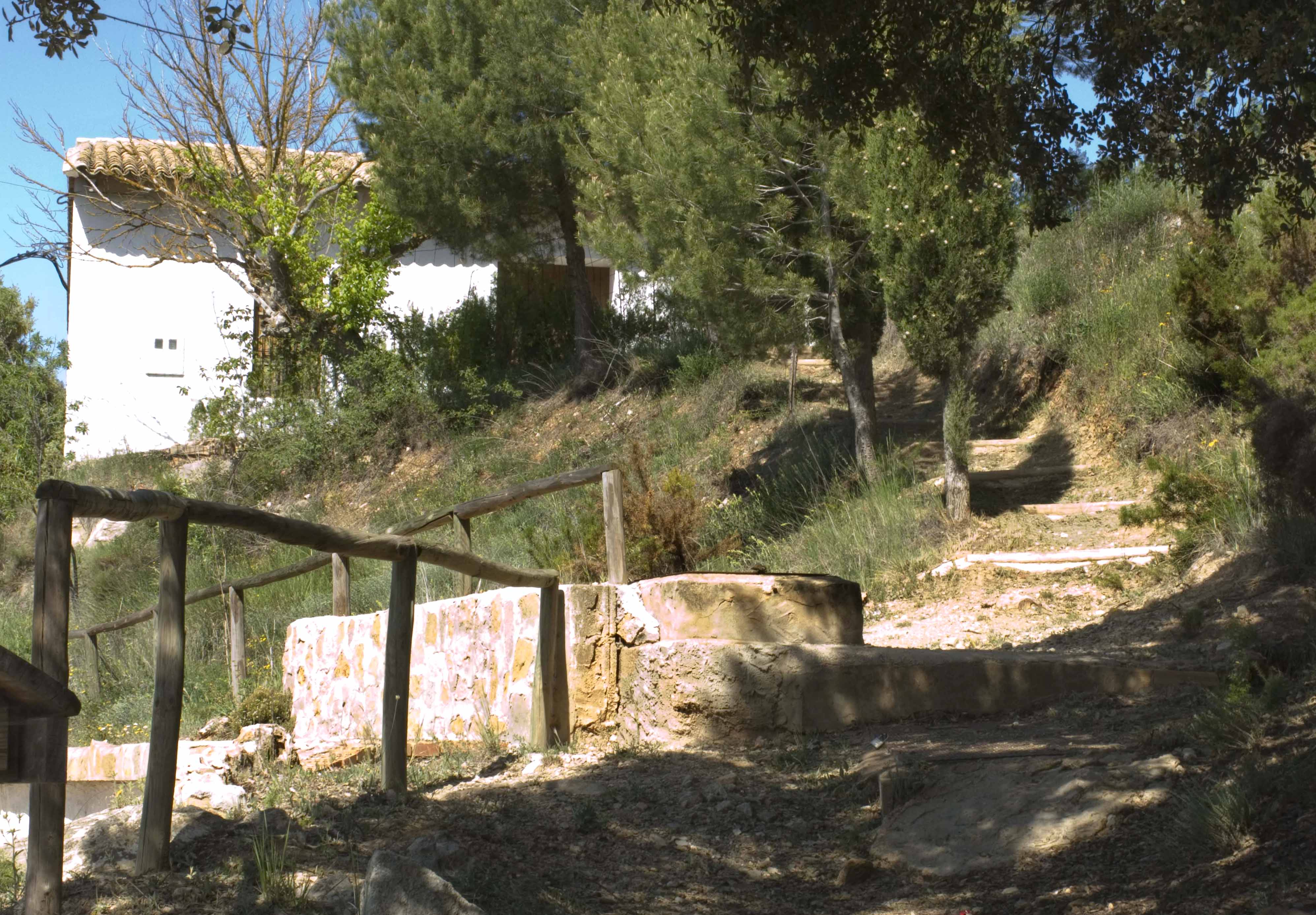
- Interactive map of Villar de Olmos
- Country: Spain
- Province: Valencia
- Municipality: Requena
- Comarca: Requena-Utiel

Population (2015)
  - Total: 17

Villar de Olmos is a village in Valencia, Spain. It is part of the municipality of Requena and belongs to the comarca Requena-Utiel.
