= San Antonio (Requena) =

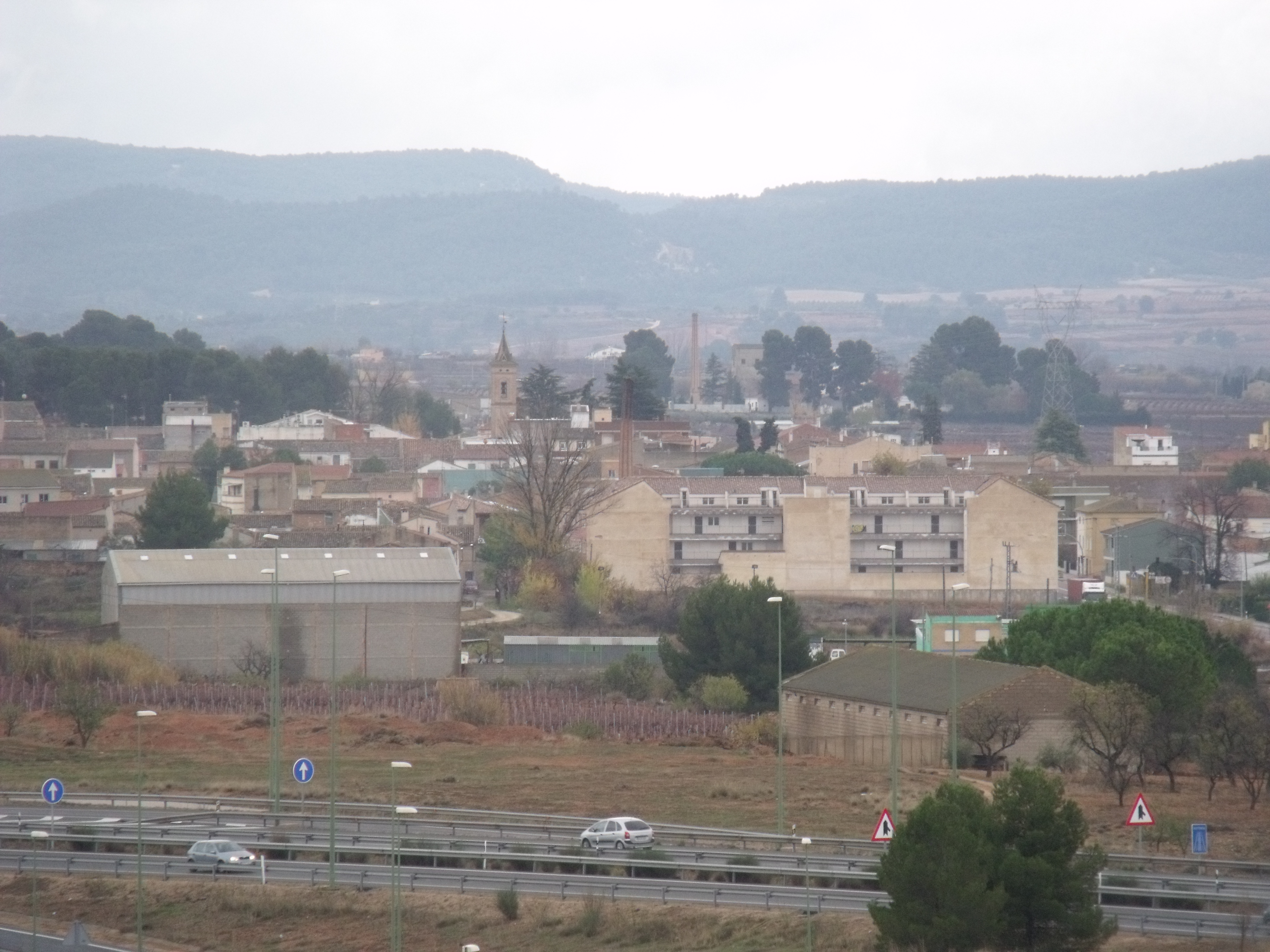
- Interactive map of San Antonio
- Coordinates: 39.521111°N 1.151944°W
- Country: Spain
- Province: Valencia
- Municipality: Requena
- Comarca: Requena-Utiel

Population (2015)
  - Total: 1,840

San Antonio is a village in Valencia, Spain. It is part of the municipality of Requena and belongs to the comarca Requena-Utiel. It had 1840 inhabitants in 2015.
