= El Derramador (Requena) =

- Flag Coat of arms

- Country: Spain
- Province: Valencia
- Municipality: Requena
- Comarca: Requena-Utiel

Population
  - Total: 455
- Area code: 03

El Derramador is a village in Valencia, Spain. It is part of the municipality of Requena and belongs to the comarca Requena-Utiel. It is one of the least populated areas which is more dedicated to irrigation. After the urban boom of Alicante, more and more villas appeared and old farmhouses are rehabilitated as a second homes.
