= La Portera =

Coordinates: 39°24′N 1°06′W

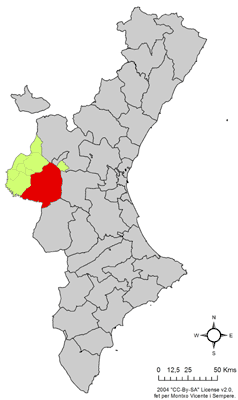
- La Portera
- Interactive map of La Portera
- Country: Spain
- Province: Valencia
- Municipality: Requena
- Comarca: Requena-Utiel

Population (2015)
  - Total: 134

La Portera is a village in Valencia, Spain. It is part of the municipality of Requena.
