= Utiel =

- Municipality
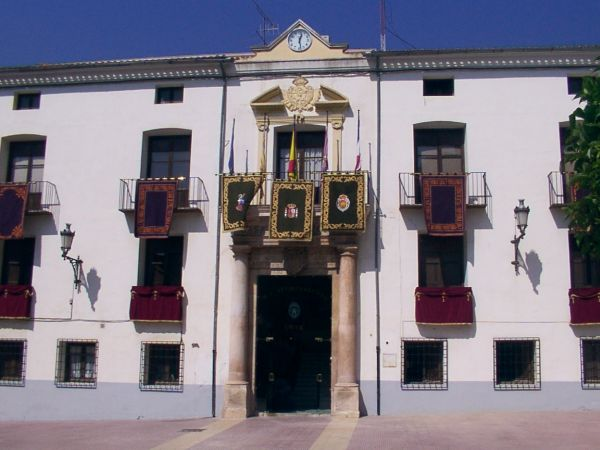
- Town hall

- Flag Coat of arms

- Location in Spain Utiel (Spain)
- Coordinates: 39°34′2″N 1°12′24″W
- Province: Valencia
- Comarca: Plana de Utiel
- Judicial district: Requena

Government
  - Alcalde: José Luis Ramírez Ortiz (2011) (PP)

Area
  - Total: 236.9 km^{2} (91.5 sq mi)
- Elevation: 720 m (2,360 ft)

Population (2025-01-01)
  - Total: 11,663
  - Density: 49.23/km^{2} (127.5/sq mi)
- Demonym(s): Utielano, Utielana
- Time zone: UTC+1 (CET)
  - Summer (DST): UTC+2 (CEST)
- Postal code: 46300
- Official language(s): Spanish
- Website: Official website

Utiel is a municipality in the comarca of Plana de Utiel in the Valencian Community, Spain.

According to the 2014 census, the municipality has a population of 12,082 inhabitants.

The Shrine of El Remedio is located on top of the Sierra de Utiel range, near Utiel.

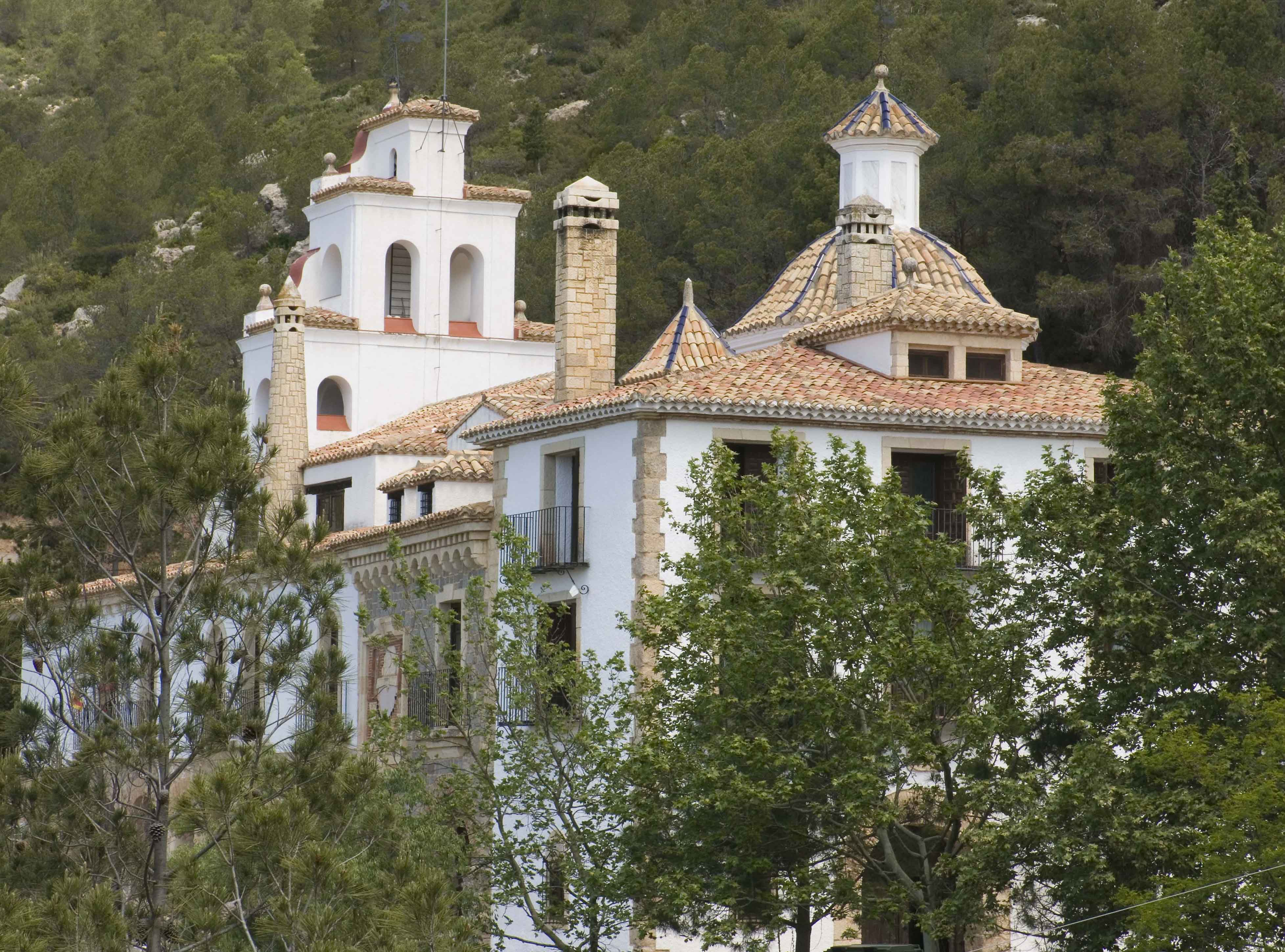
The Shrine of El Remedio

== Population centres ==
- Utiel town.
- Las Casas, at the feet of the Sierra de la Bicuerca, with 350 inhabitants.
- Los Corrales^{es}, about 5 km from Utiel town, with 327 inhabitants
- Las Cuevas, with 607 inhabitants. The railway station of the Cuenca-Valencia line is located in this village.
- Estenas, in the Sierra del Negrete, with 34 inhabitants
- La Torre, about 13 km NW of Utiel town, with 145 inhabitants
- Other minor settlements include El Remedio, Casas de Medina and El Hontanar.

== Climate ==
Utiel has a cold semi-arid climate (Köppen climate classification: BSk) with precipitation being irregular in some years. Winters are cool to mild, while the summers are hot, although the nights can be relatively cool. It is one of the driest cities in the Province of Valencia.

Climate data for Utiel (1991–2020), extremes (1991-present)
Month	Jan	Feb	Mar	Apr	May	Jun	Jul	Aug	Sep	Oct	Nov	Dec	Year
Record high °C (°F)	23.2 (73.8)	23.8 (74.8)	29.8 (85.6)	32.0 (89.6)	38.0 (100.4)	40.3 (104.5)	41.6 (106.9)	43.3 (109.9)	39.3 (102.7)	32.5 (90.5)	26.8 (80.2)	21.6 (70.9)	43.3 (109.9)
Mean daily maximum °C (°F)	11.8 (53.2)	13.4 (56.1)	16.4 (61.5)	19.2 (66.6)	24.0 (75.2)	29.4 (84.9)	33.3 (91.9)	32.5 (90.5)	27.1 (80.8)	21.5 (70.7)	15.1 (59.2)	12.1 (53.8)	21.3 (70.4)
Daily mean °C (°F)	5.8 (42.4)	6.8 (44.2)	9.5 (49.1)	12.1 (53.8)	16.4 (61.5)	20.6 (69.1)	23.7 (74.7)	23.4 (74.1)	19.3 (66.7)	14.5 (58.1)	9.1 (48.4)	6.4 (43.5)	14.0 (57.1)
Mean daily minimum °C (°F)	−0.3 (31.5)	0.2 (32.4)	2.5 (36.5)	4.9 (40.8)	8.6 (47.5)	11.8 (53.2)	14.1 (57.4)	14.2 (57.6)	11.5 (52.7)	7.4 (45.3)	3.0 (37.4)	0.6 (33.1)	6.5 (43.8)
Record low °C (°F)	−17.4 (0.7)	−10.5 (13.1)	−8.4 (16.9)	−5.4 (22.3)	−0.9 (30.4)	1.1 (34.0)	6.1 (43.0)	5.9 (42.6)	0.6 (33.1)	−1.6 (29.1)	−10.7 (12.7)	−10.7 (12.7)	−17.4 (0.7)
Average precipitation mm (inches)	27.8 (1.09)	16.2 (0.64)	26.7 (1.05)	37.0 (1.46)	43.8 (1.72)	26.5 (1.04)	7.1 (0.28)	11.6 (0.46)	32.0 (1.26)	40.2 (1.58)	36.0 (1.42)	30.6 (1.20)	335.5 (13.2)
Average precipitation days (≥ 1 mm)	4.0	3.0	4.8	5.5	5.5	3.0	1.3	2.0	4.1	4.9	5.1	4.7	47.9
Source: Agencia Estatal de Meteorologia

== Economy ==
- Bodegas Vicente Gandia, Valencian wine producer and seller company founded in 1885

== See also ==
- List of municipalities in Valencia
