= Fuen Vich =

Coordinates: 39.3522°N 1.0561°W

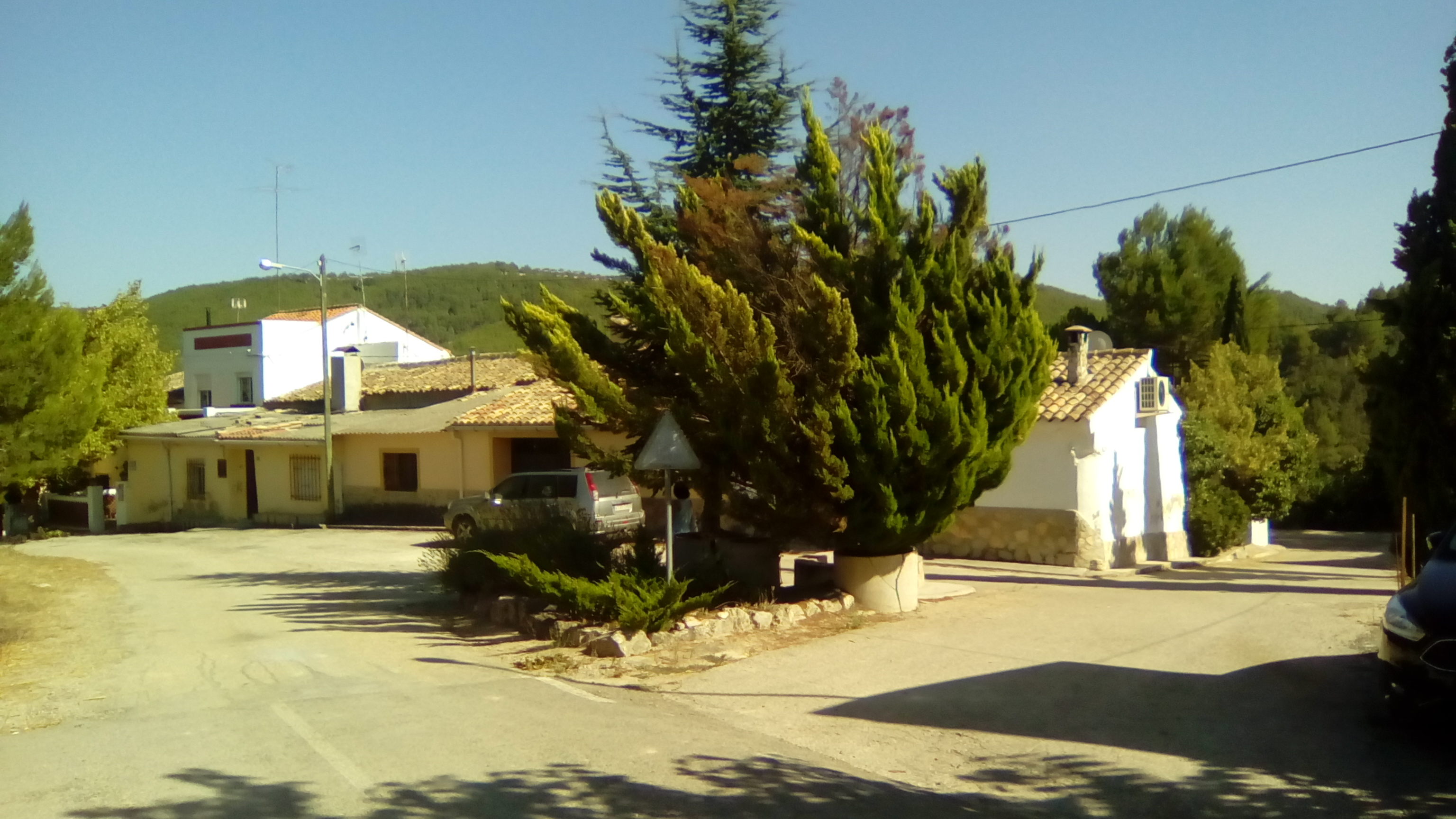
- Fuen Vich
- Interactive map of Fuen Vich
- Country: Spain
- Province: Valencia
- Municipality: Requena
- Comarca: Requena-Utiel

Population (2015)
  - Total: 3

Fuen Vich is a village in Valencia, Spain. It is part of the municipality of Requena and belongs to the comarca of Requena-Utiel.
