= Camporrobles =

- Municipality
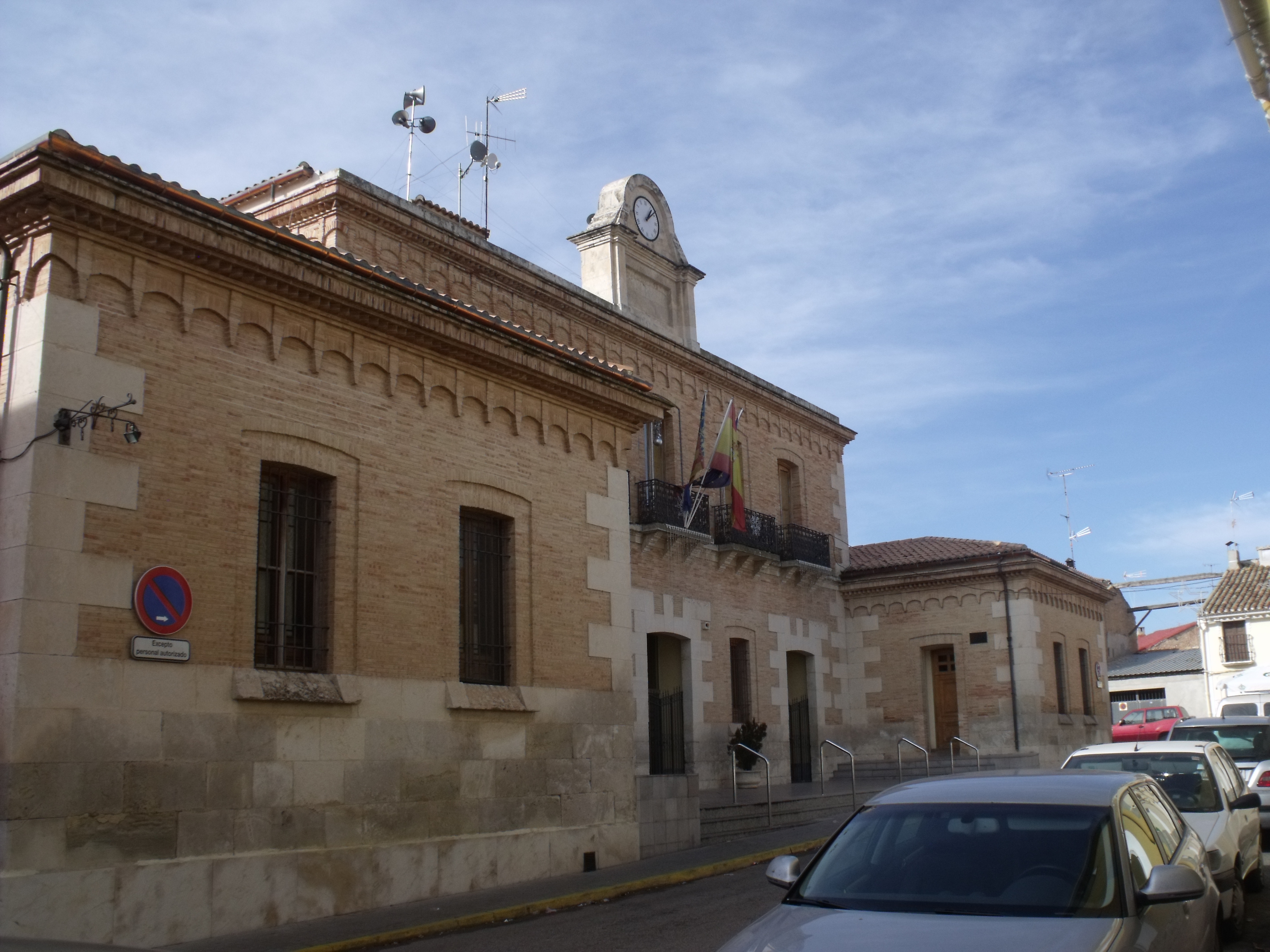
- Town hall

- Coat of arms

- Location in Spain
- Coordinates: 39°38′53″N 1°23′43″W
- Country: Spain
- Autonomous community: Valencian Community
- Province: Valencia
- Comarca: Requena-Utiel
- Judicial district: Requena

Government
  - Alcalde: Miguel Ángel Lorente Berlanga (PSPV-PSOE)

Area
  - Total: 89.5 km^{2} (34.6 sq mi)
- Elevation: 908 m (2,979 ft)

Population (2025-01-01)
  - Total: 1,183
  - Density: 13.2/km^{2} (34.2/sq mi)
- Demonym: Camporruteño/a
- Time zone: UTC+1 (CET)
  - Summer (DST): UTC+2 (CEST)
- Postal code: 46330
- Official language(s): Spanish
- Website: Official website

Camporrobles is a municipality in the comarca of Requena-Utiel in the Valencian Community, Spain.

== See also ==
- List of municipalities in Valencia
