= Maria Ibars i Ibars =

Valencian writer and teacher

- Born: February 29, 1892; Valencia, Spain
- Died: January 9, 1965 (aged 72); Valencia, Spain
- Occupations: writer, teacher
- Writing career
- Language: Spanish, Catalan

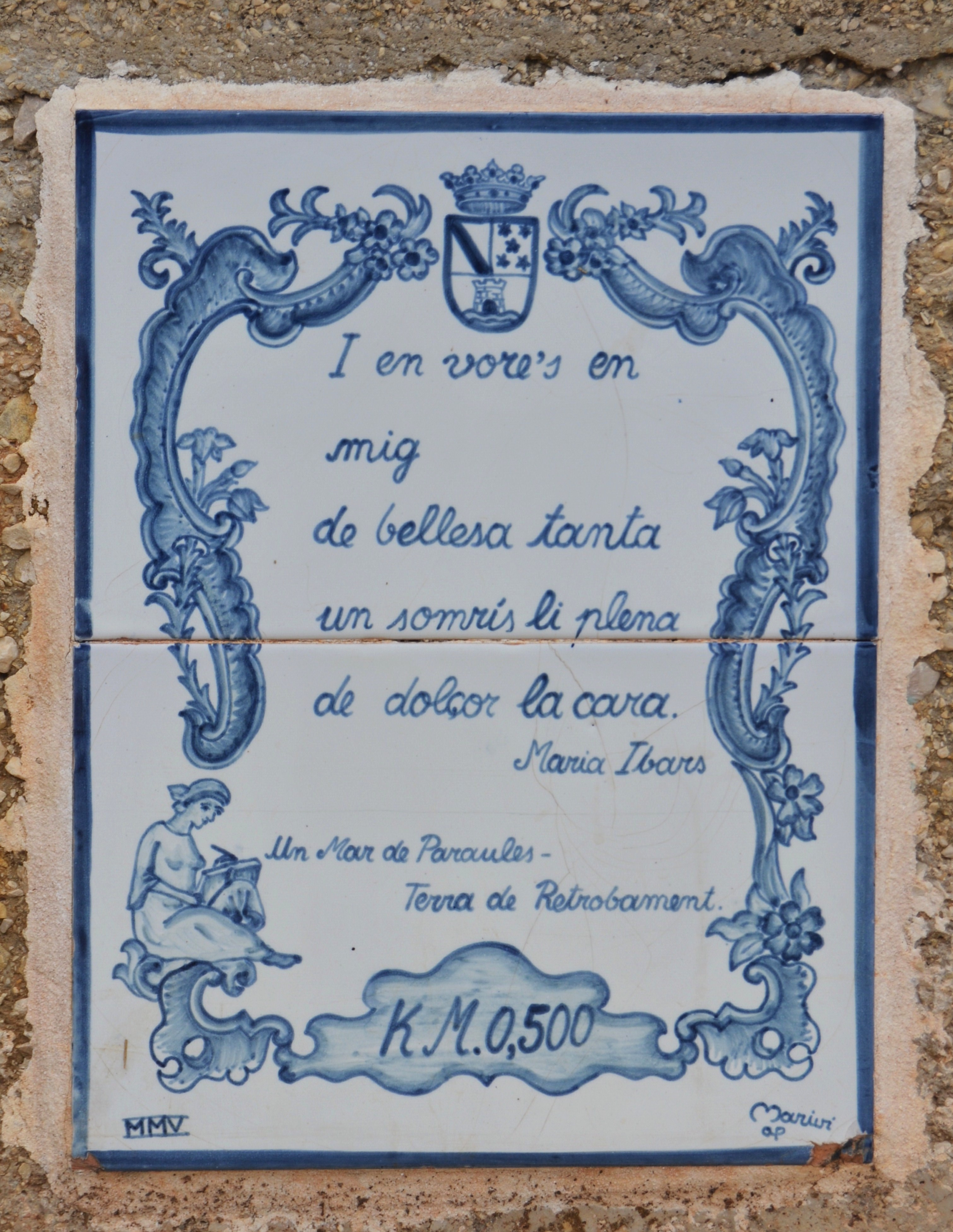
A plaque with a poem by Ibars i Ibars, Dénia

Maria Ibars i Ibars (1892–1965) was a Valencian writer and teacher who wrote in Spanish and Catalan.

== Early life and education ==
Maria Ibars i Ibars was born on February 29, 1892, in Valencia, and grew up in Dénia. She studied in Valencia to become a teacher.

== Career ==
Between 1916 and 1934, Ibars i Ibars taught at La Font de la Figuera, then moved to Valencia, where she continued teaching and focused on literary and pedagogical activities. She participated in the activities of the literary and philological section of Lo Rat Penat.

Ibars i Ibars wrote in Spanish and Catalan and published in Las Provincias, El Vers Valencià, Pensat i Fet, L'Altar del Mercat, Glorieta, Sicània and La Marina. Her body of work consists mostly of novels, but she also wrote poetry and theatre pieces. Many of her works were inspired by Dénia and its surroundings.

== Death and legacy ==
Ibars i Ibars died on January 9, 1965, in Valencia. A school in Dénia bears her name, she was also officially named the adopted daughter of the city. María Teresa Oller set three of her poems to music.

== Works ==
- Poemas de Penyamar, 1949
- Como una garra, 1961
- La descalumniada, 1961
- Camp d’ús, 1961
- Vides planes, 1962
- Graciamar, 1963
- L’últim serv, 1963
- La fe dels altres, 1965
- La presa, 1966
- El miracle de Teulada (play), 1992
- Contalles a l’ombra del Montgó (contains: La descalumniada, Camp d’ús, La fe dels altres and La presa), 1994
