= Los Pedrones =

Coordinates: 39.3354°N 1.0834°W

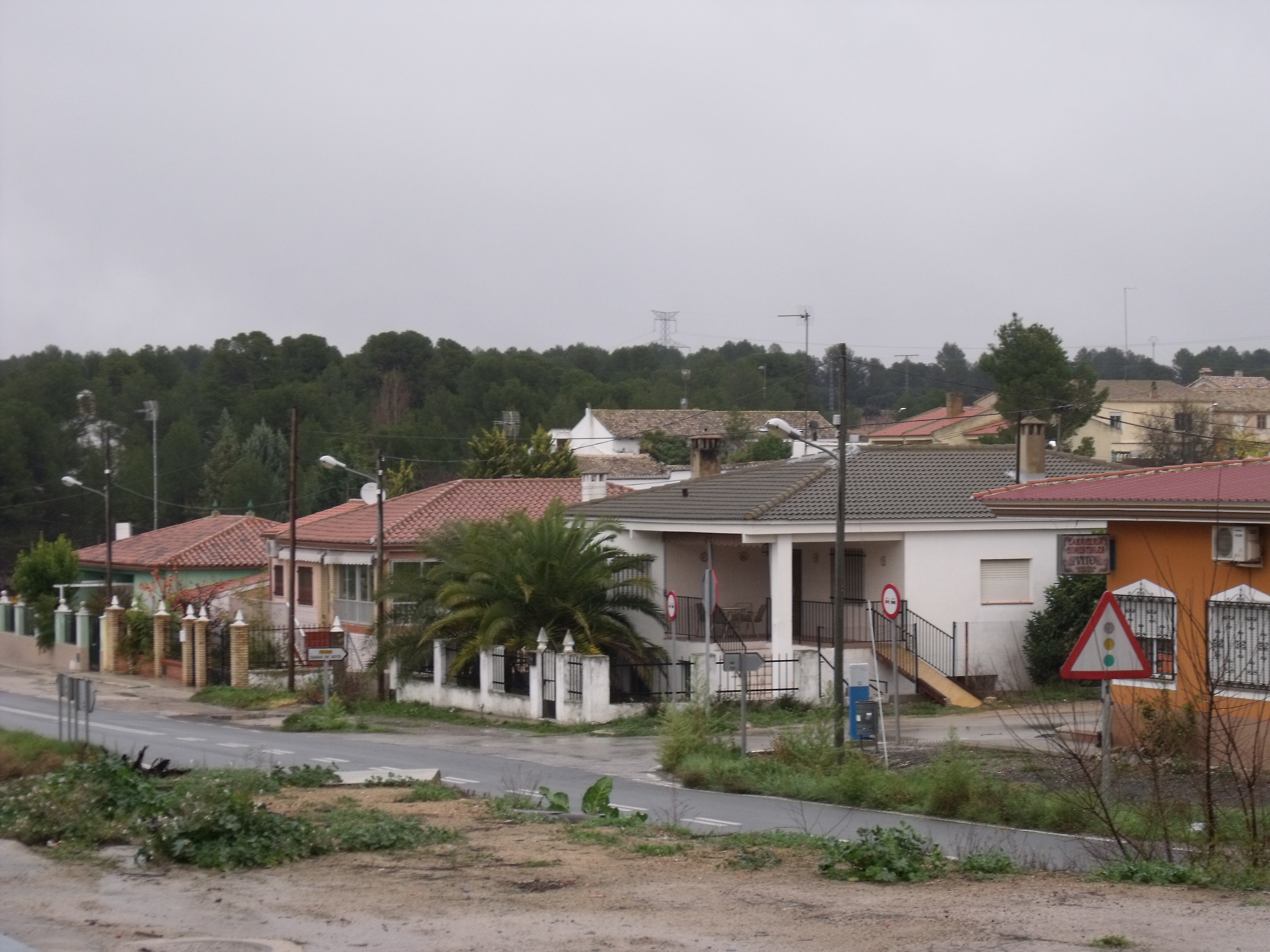
- Interactive map of Los Pedrones
- Country: Spain
- Province: Valencia
- Municipality: Requena
- Comarca: Requena-Utiel

Population (2015)
  - Total: 170

Los Pedrones is a village in Valencia, Spain. It is part of the municipality of Requena and belongs to the comarca Requena-Utiel.
