= Caudete de las Fuentes =

- Municipality
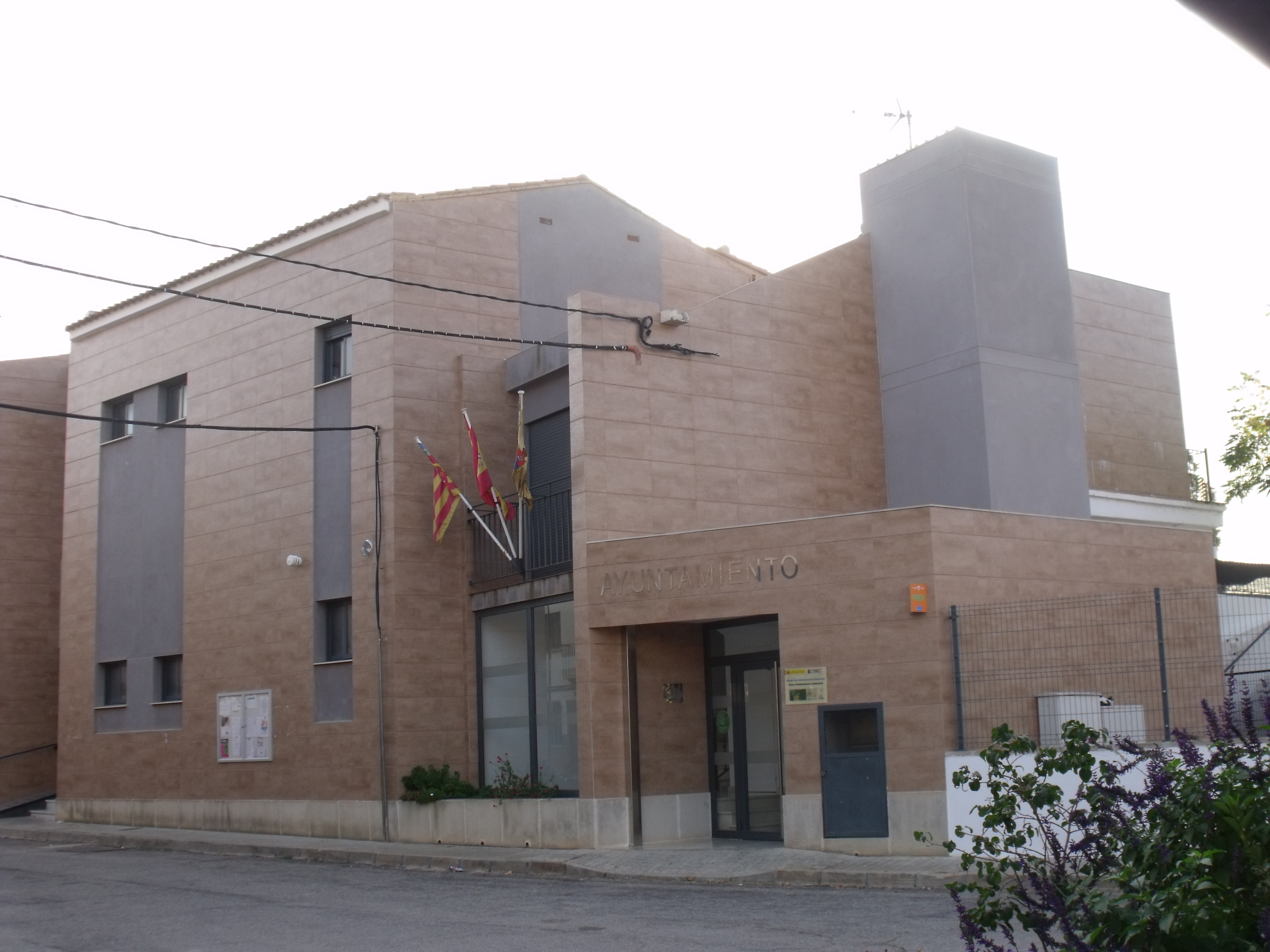
- Town hall

- Coat of arms

- Location in Spain
- Coordinates: 39°33′30″N 1°16′43″W
- Country: Spain
- Autonomous community: Valencian Community
- Province: Valencia
- Comarca: Requena-Utiel
- Judicial district: Requena

Government
  - Alcalde: Rafael Cerveró Vicente

Area
  - Total: 34.6 km^{2} (13.4 sq mi)
- Elevation: 771 m (2,530 ft)

Population (2025-01-01)
  - Total: 725
  - Density: 21.0/km^{2} (54.3/sq mi)
- Demonym(s): caudeteño, -a
- Time zone: UTC+1 (CET)
  - Summer (DST): UTC+2 (CEST)
- Postal code: 46315
- Official language(s): Spanish
- Website: Official website

Caudete de las Fuentes is a municipality in the comarca of Requena-Utiel in the Valencian Community, Spain.

== See also ==
- List of municipalities in Valencia
