= Iglesia del Salvador, Requena =

Church in Requena, Spain

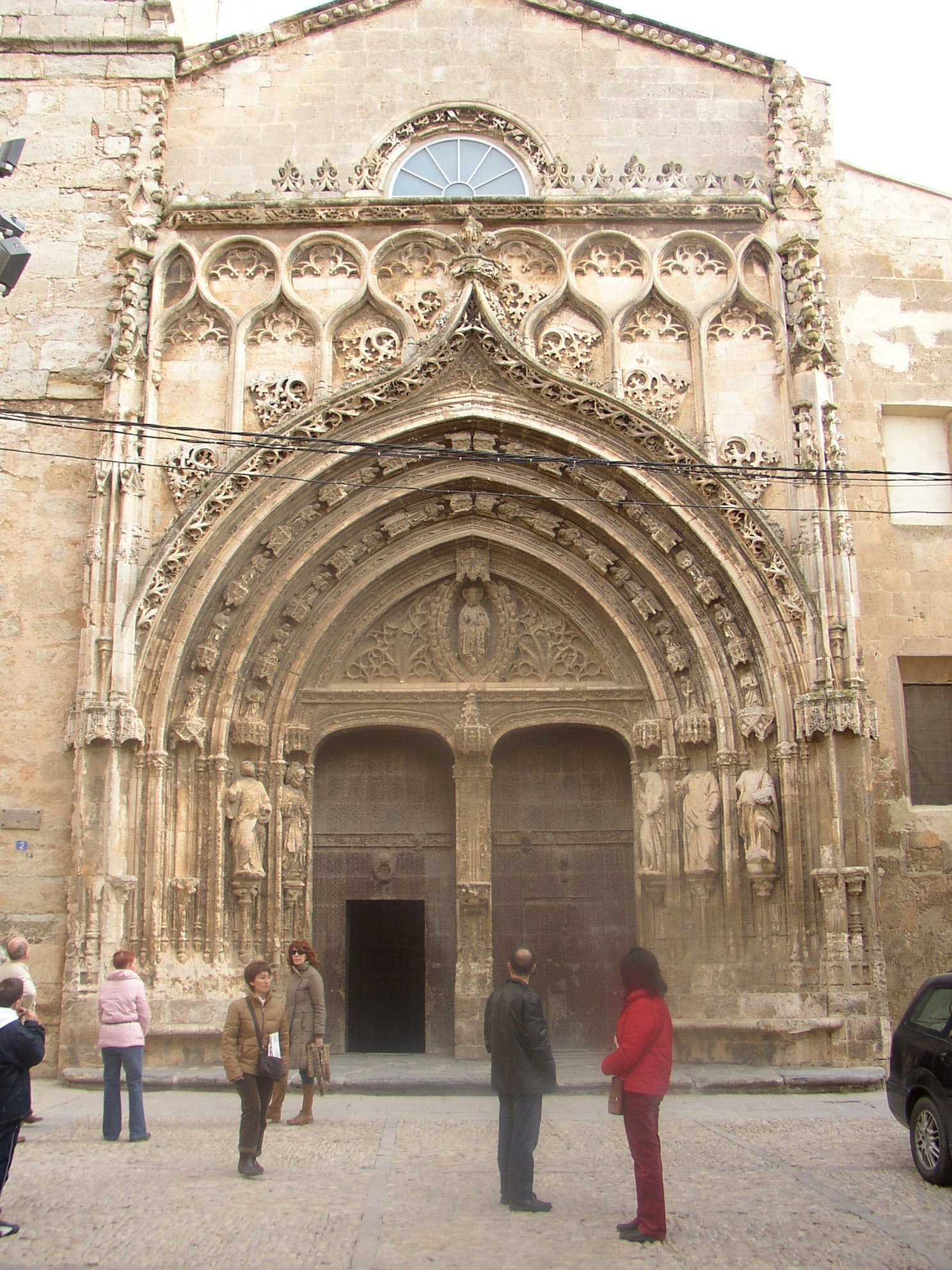
Iglesia Arciprestal del Salvador

The Iglesia Arciprestal del Salvador (Archiprestal Church of the Savior) is Renaissance-style, Roman Catholic church in Requena, province of Valencia, Spain.

The church was erected in the 15th century in Isabelline Gothic architecture, although it underwent baroque refurbishment in the 18th century, including the addition of the Chapel of the Communion, and the bell-tower. It was declared in 1966, along with the town a Conjunto Histórico-Artístico Nacional. The church has three naves with side chapels. The main façade has three highly sculpted portals.
