= Iglesia del Carmen, Requena =

Church building in Requena, Spain

The Iglesia del Carmen (Church of Virgin of the Carmelites) is Gothic and Baroque-style, Roman Catholic church located in Requena, province of Valencia, Spain.

The church was originally attached to a 13th-century Convent of the Carmelite Nuns. The walls are decorated in azulejo tiles. The Façade is neoclassic but maintains a later portal. It contains a decorated Chapel of the Virgen de la Soterrraña (Subterranean Virgin).

== See also ==
- Catholic Church in Spain
