= Villargordo del Cabriel =

- Municipality
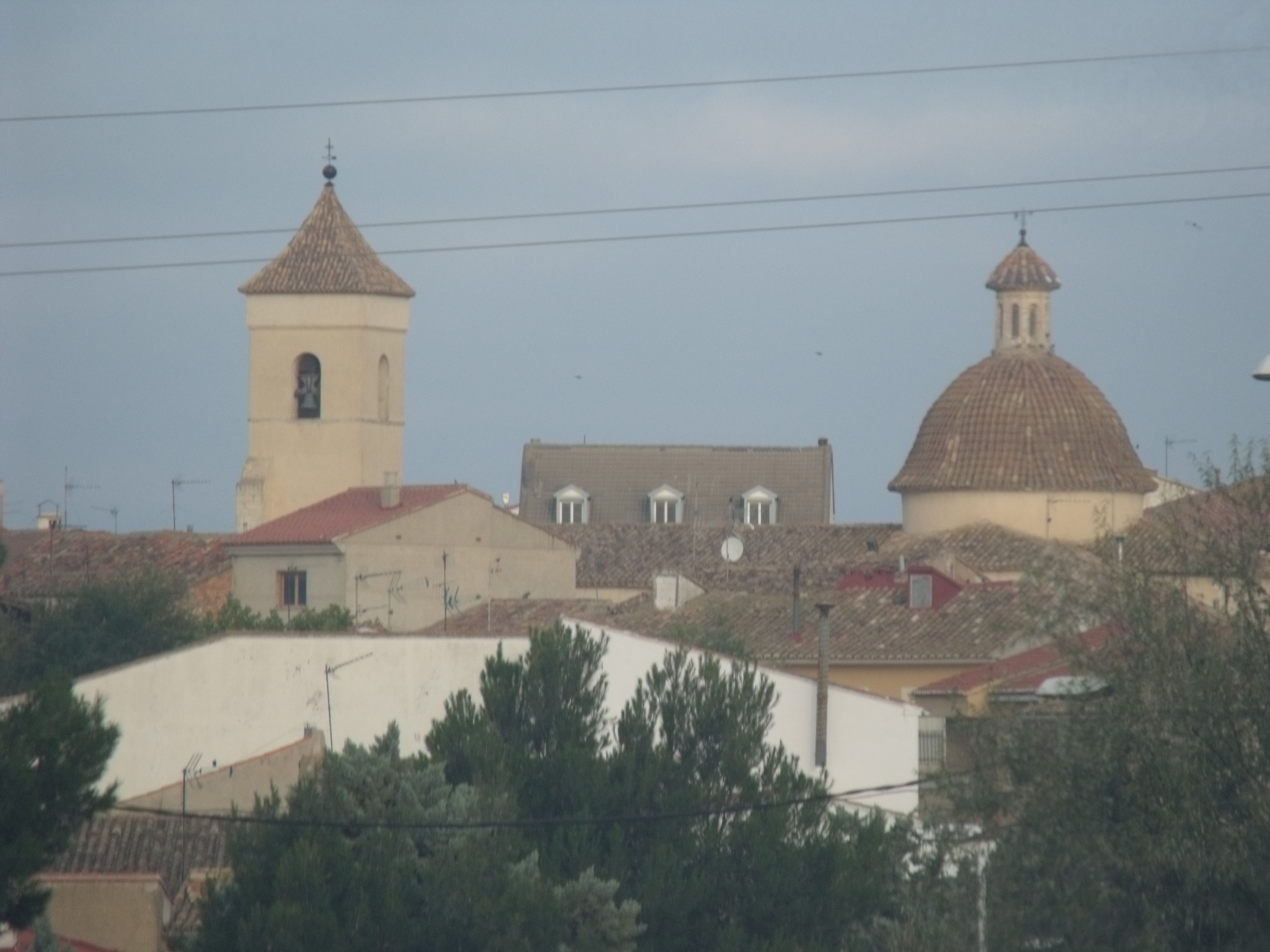
- Villargordo del Cabriel

- Flag Coat of arms

- Location in Spain
- Coordinates: 39°32′29″N 1°26′28″W
- Country: Spain
- Autonomous community: Valencian Community
- Province: Valencia
- Comarca: Requena-Utiel
- Judicial district: Requena

Government
  - Alcalde: Lorenzo Guaita Albalata

Area
  - Total: 71.6 km^{2} (27.6 sq mi)
- Elevation: 850 m (2,790 ft)

Population (2025-01-01)
  - Total: 588
  - Density: 8.21/km^{2} (21.3/sq mi)
- Demonym: Villargordeño/a
- Time zone: UTC+1 (CET)
  - Summer (DST): UTC+2 (CEST)
- Postal code: 46317
- Official language(s): Spanish
- Website: Official website

Villargordo del Cabriel is a municipality in the comarca of Requena-Utiel in the Valencian Community, Spain.

== See also ==
- List of municipalities in Valencia
