= Santa Maria, Requena =

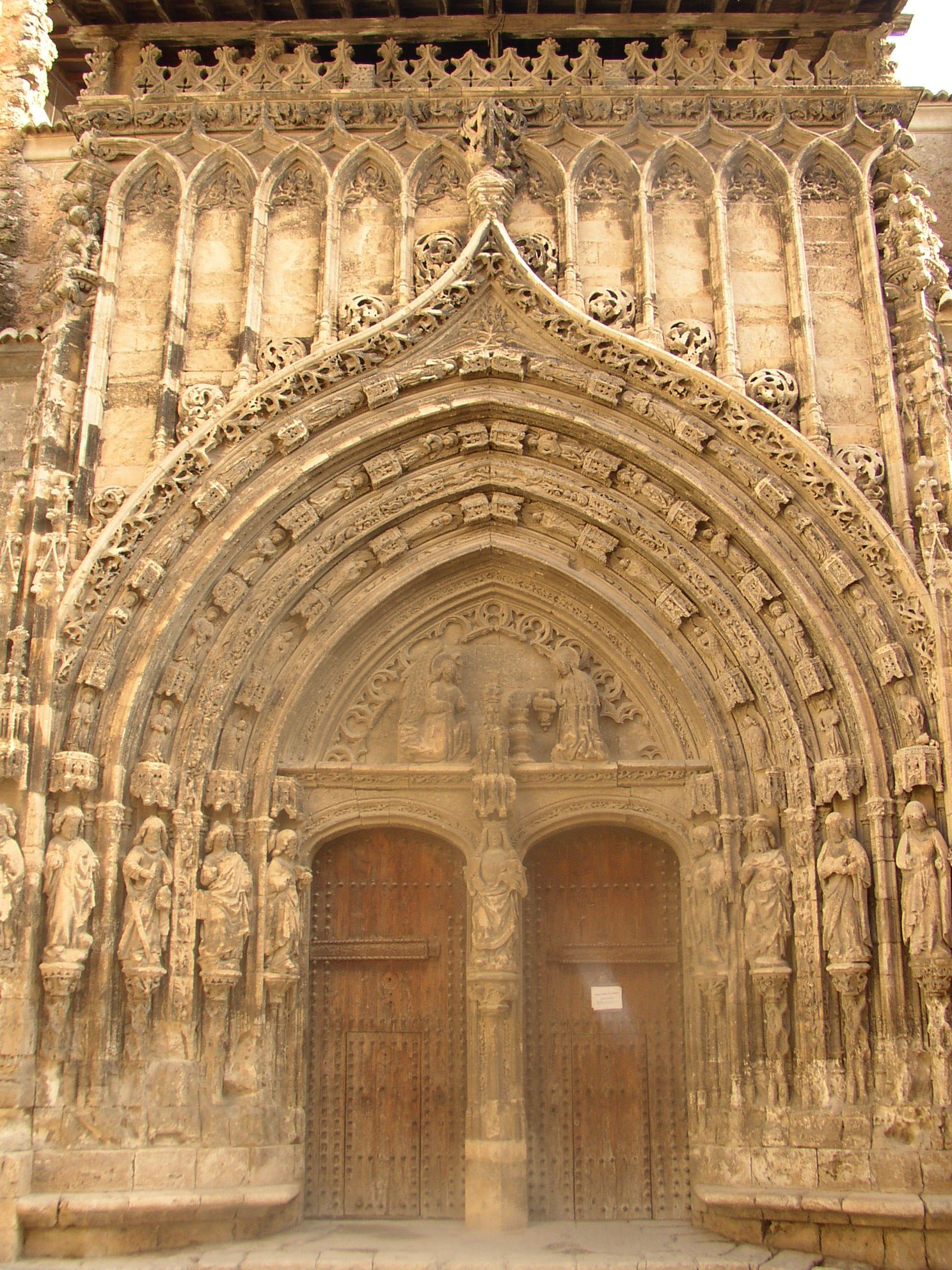
- Interactive map of the Santa Maria, Requena area

General information
- Type: church
- Architectural style: Gothic and Baroque
- Location: Requena, Valencia, Spain
- Coordinates: 39°29′N 1°06′W
- Construction started: late 15th century

Design and construction
- Designations: Bien de Interés Cultural

Santa María (St Mary) is Gothic and Baroque-style, Roman Catholic church located in Requena, Valencia, Spain.

The church was begun originally in Isabelline Gothic style in the late 15th century, but work continued until the 18th century. The main gothic portal is highly sculpted with angels, floral motifs, and a scene of the Annunciation in the tympanum. The church lost much of its interior decoration and azulejo tile during and after the Spanish Civil War. The church is also used for concerts. It was declared a national monument in 1931.
