= San Sebastian, Requena =

Church building in Requena, Spain

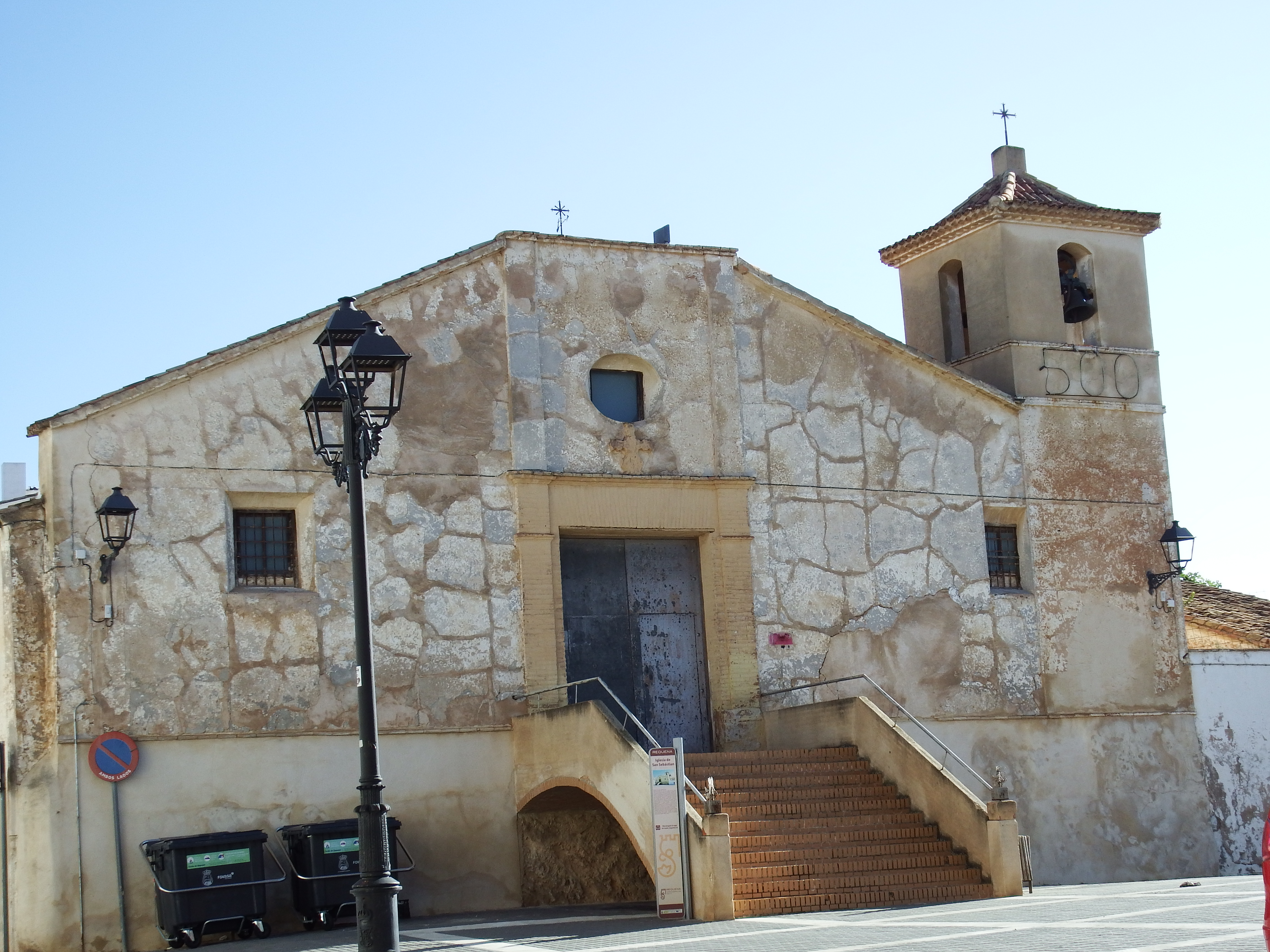
Barrio de las Peñas, Requena 12.jpg

San Sebastián (St Sebastian) is Renaissance-style, Roman Catholic church located in the Plaza de San Sebastián in Requena, province of Valencia, Spain.

The church was erected in the 14th century as a hermitage for new converts to Christianity. These were subsequently expelled as Moriscos in the 17th century. In 1663, to prevent pillaging by Moriscos of the church soldiers of Don Pedro de Cisneros, looted the interior. In 1748, the mudéjar apse and chapels were refurbished in a baroque fashion. recent restorations, have revealed some of the former architectural elements.
