= Hortunas =

Coordinates: 39.3920°N 1.0467°W

- Interactive map of Hortunas
- Country: Spain
- Province: Valencia
- Municipality: Requena
- Comarca: Requena-Utiel

Population (2015)
  - Total: 42

Hortunas is a village in Valencia, Spain. It is part of the municipality of Requena and belongs to the comarca Requena-Utiel.

== History ==
The first archeological evidence of settlement in Hortunas dates back to the 15th or 16th century.
