= Chera, Spain =

Chera
- Municipality
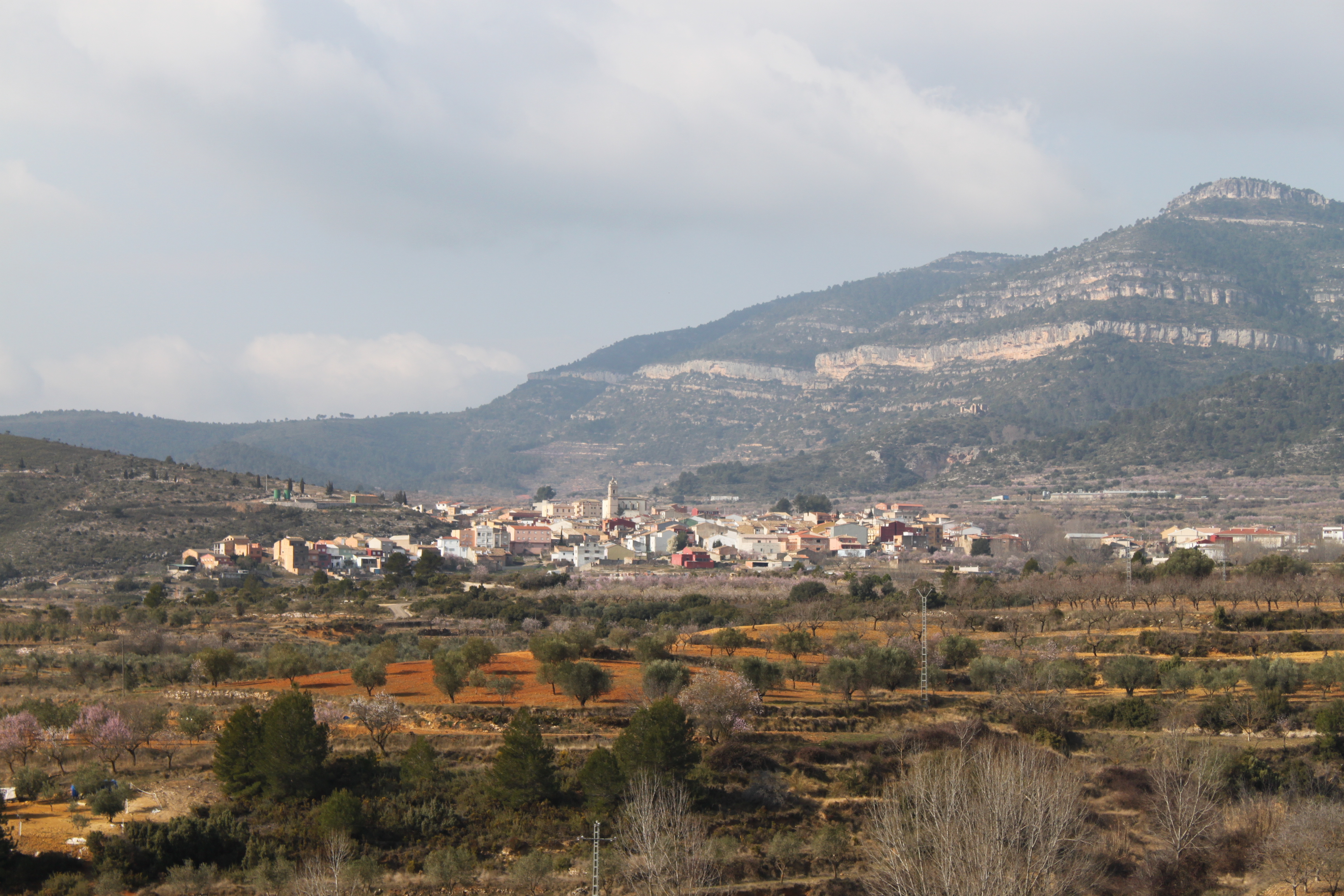
- Chera in 2012

- Coat of arms

- Location of Sinarcas in Spain Chera (Valencian Community) Chera (Spain)
- Coordinates: 39°35′29″N 0°58′32″W
- Country: Spain
- Autonomous community: Valencian Community
- Province: Valencia
- Comarca: Requena-Utiel
- Judicial district: Requena

Government
  - Alcalde: Alejandro Portero Igual PSOE

Area
  - Total: 54.5 km^{2} (21.0 sq mi)
- Elevation: 600 m (2,000 ft)

Population (2025-01-01)
  - Total: 508
  - Density: 9.32/km^{2} (24.1/sq mi)
- Demonym: cherano/a
- Time zone: UTC+1 (CET)
  - Summer (DST): UTC+2 (CEST)
- Postal code: 46350
- Official language(s): Spanish
- Website: Official website

Chera is a municipality in the comarca of Requena-Utiel in the Valencian Community, Spain. The name in Valencian is Xera, but the local language is Spanish, not Valencian.

Geographically and historically Chera was part of the Serrans comarca. Nowadays, according to the current administrative division pattern of the Valencian Community, Chera is officially part of the Requena-Utiel comarca.

The Castle of Chera, dating to the 12th century is located within the municipality. The Natural Park of Chera-Sot de Chera is shared with Sot de Chera.

== See also ==
- Sierra de Utiel
- List of municipalities in Valencia
