= Venta del Moro =

- Municipality
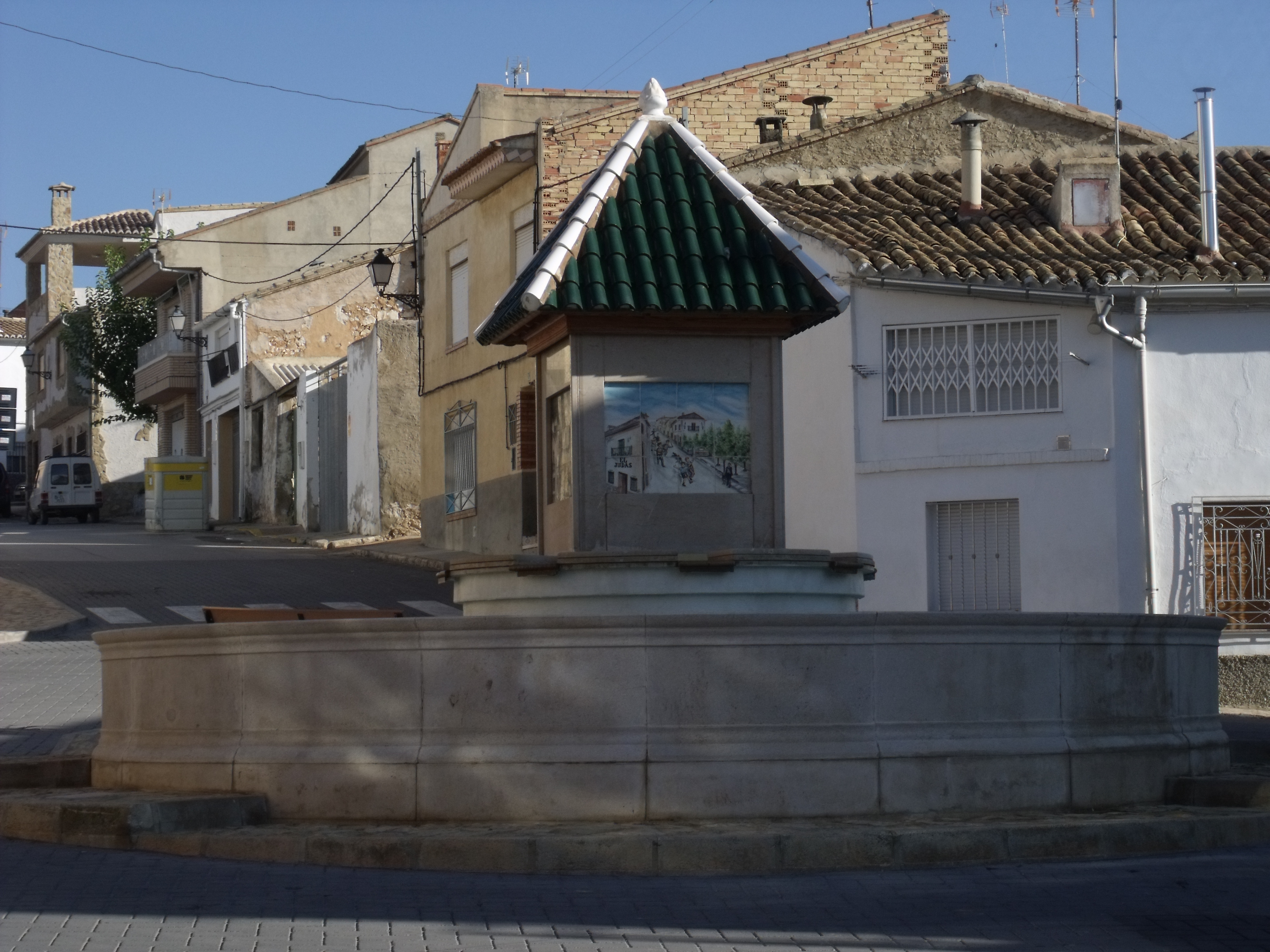

- Coat of arms

- Location in Spain
- Coordinates: 39°29′0″N 1°21′26″W
- Country: Spain
- Autonomous community: Valencian Community
- Province: Valencia
- Comarca: Requena-Utiel
- Judicial district: Requena

Government
  - Alcalde: Luis Beltrán Jiménez (2007) (PSOE)

Area
  - Total: 272.6 km^{2} (105.3 sq mi)
- Elevation: 730 m (2,400 ft)

Population (2025-01-01)
  - Total: 1,143
  - Density: 4.193/km^{2} (10.86/sq mi)
- Demonym: Venturreño/a
- Time zone: UTC+1 (CET)
  - Summer (DST): UTC+2 (CEST)
- Postal code: 46310
- Official language(s): Spanish
- Climate: Csa
- Website: Official website

Venta del Moro is a municipality in the comarca of Requena-Utiel in the Valencian Community, Spain.

== List of villages in the municipality ==
- Casas de Moya
- Casas de Pradas
- Casas del Rey
- Jaraguas
- Las Monjas
- Los Marcos

== See also ==
- List of municipalities in Valencia
