= Fuenterrobles =

- Municipality
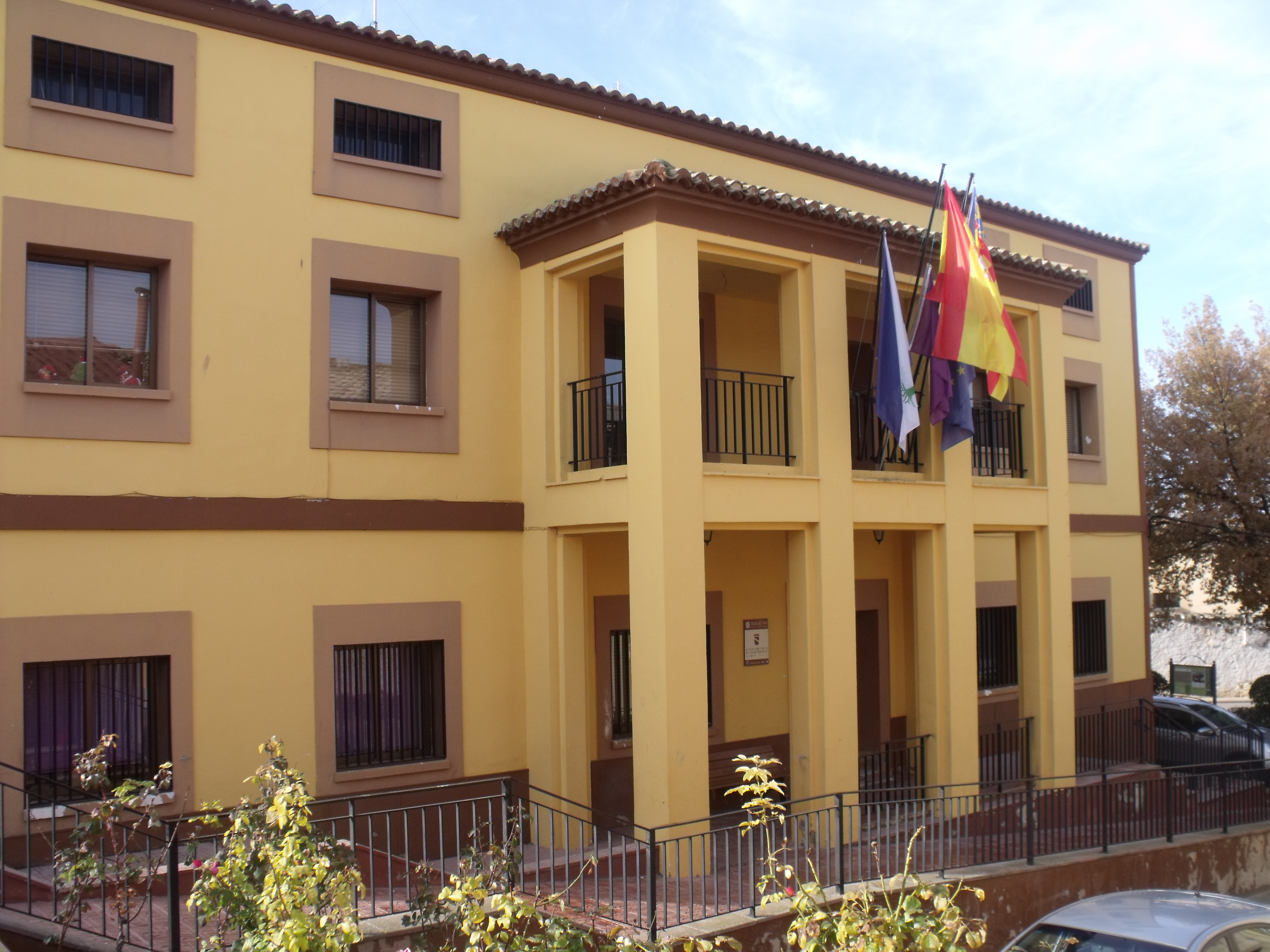
- Town hall

- Flag Coat of arms

- Location in Spain
- Coordinates: 39°35′12″N 1°21′56″W
- Country: Spain
- Autonomous community: Valencian Community
- Province: Valencia
- Comarca: Requena-Utiel
- Judicial district: Requena

Government
  - Alcaldesa: Estefanía Berlanga García (EUPV)

Area
  - Total: 49.50 km^{2} (19.11 sq mi)
- Elevation: 830 m (2,720 ft)

Population (2025-01-01)
  - Total: 678
  - Density: 13.7/km^{2} (35.5/sq mi)
- Demonym: fuenterrobleño/a
- Time zone: UTC+1 (CET)
  - Summer (DST): UTC+2 (CEST)
- Postal code: 46314
- Official language(s): Spanish
- Website: Official website

Fuenterrobles is a municipality in the comarca of Requena-Utiel in the Valencian Community, Spain.

== See also ==
- List of municipalities in Valencia
