= Castle of Chera =

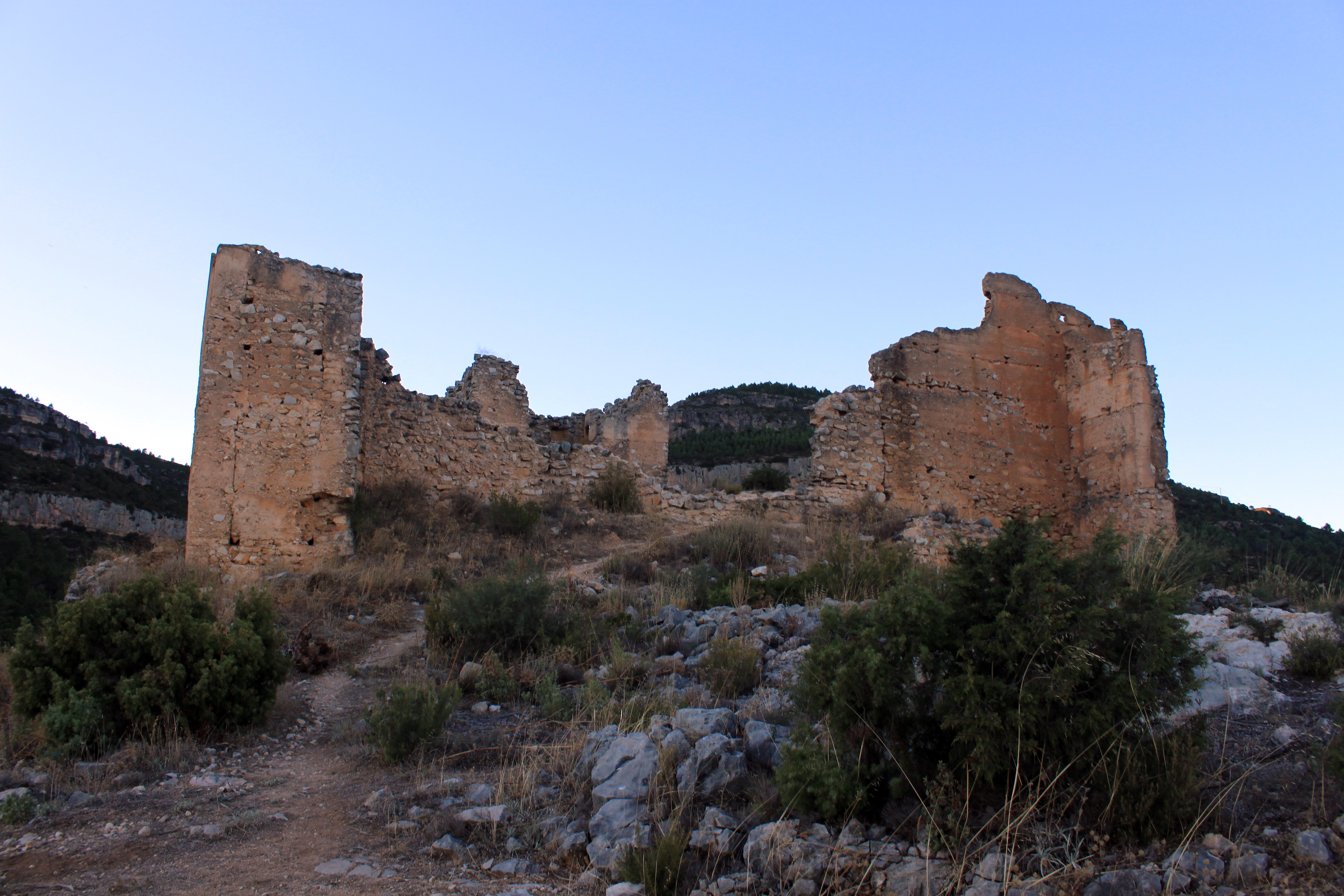
Castle of Chera

The Castle of Chera is a ruined castle dating to the 12th century located in Chera, Valencian Community, Spain.

== History ==
The castle foundation was laid in the early 12th century during the Almoravid dynasty. At the end of the 12th and start of the 13th century the castle was improved upon by the Almohad Caliphate. They doubled the walls and dug a moat. In 1238 the castle was conquered by James I of Aragon, who gave the castle to the Aragonese noble Hurtado de Lihory, who had accompanied him with the capture of the area.

The castle was located in the border region of Castille and the Kingdom of Valencia, being the last castle in Valencia. As such it was captured in 1356 by Castilian forces during the War of the Two Pedros. They held on to the castle until 1361. In the 15th century the castle was abandoned.

In October 2023 renovation works started to stabilize the remains. Some parts of the outer wall were excavated.

== Design ==
The castle has a square design with a tower in the middle.
