= Sinarcas =

- Municipality
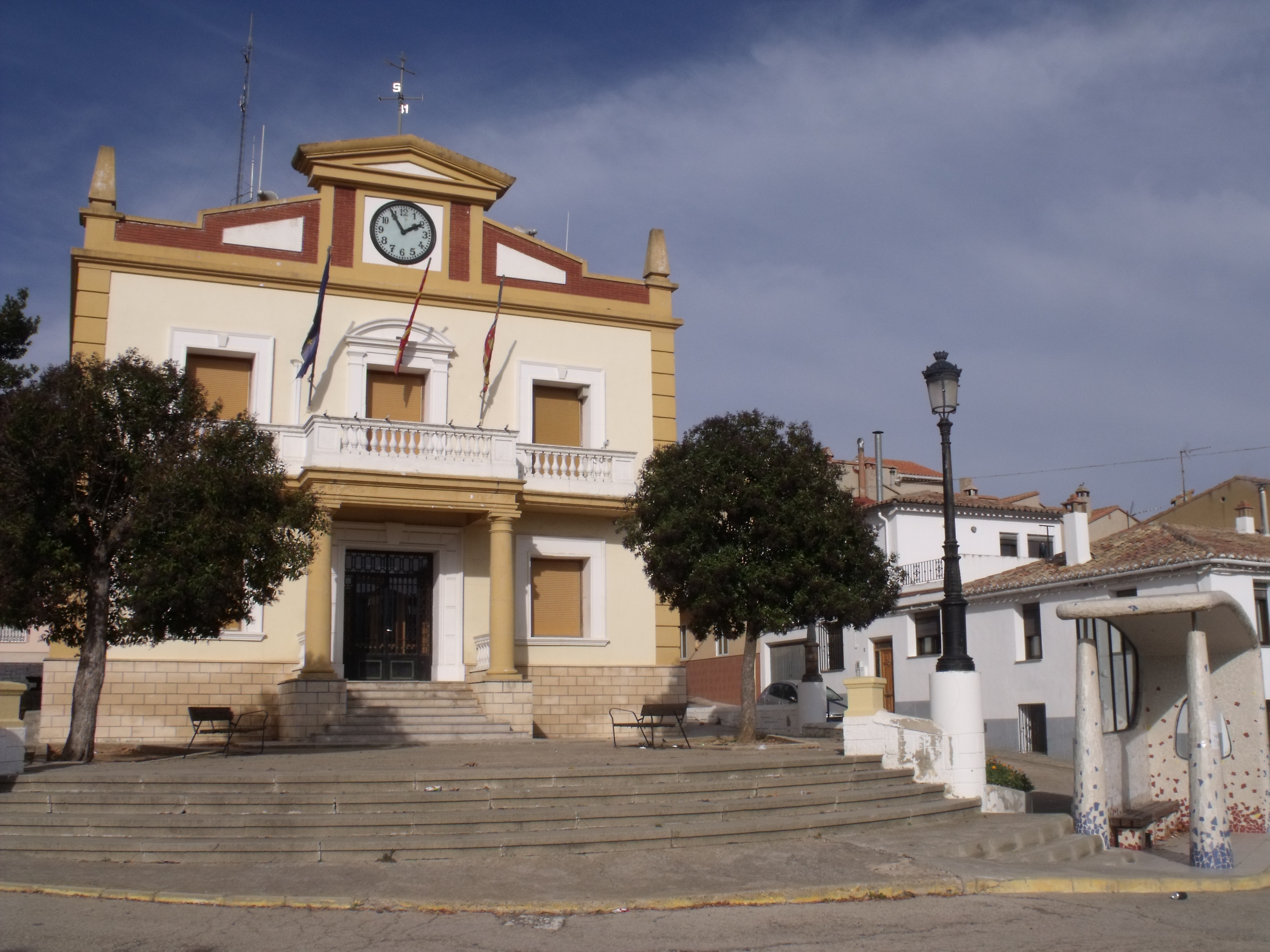
- The Town Hall

- Coat of arms

- Location of Sinarcas in Spain Sinarcas (Valencian Community) Sinarcas (Spain)
- Coordinates: 39°44′2″N 1°13′50″W
- Country: Spain
- Autonomous community: Valencian Community
- Province: Valencia
- Comarca: Requena-Utiel
- Judicial district: Requena

Government
  - Alcalde: Fidel Clemente Mas (PSPV-PSOE)

Area
  - Total: 102.5 km^{2} (39.6 sq mi)
- Elevation: 899 m (2,949 ft)

Population (2025-01-01)
  - Total: 1,176
  - Density: 11.47/km^{2} (29.72/sq mi)
- Demonym: Sinarqueño/a
- Time zone: UTC+1 (CET)
  - Summer (DST): UTC+2 (CEST)
- Postal code: 46320
- Official language(s): Spanish
- Website: Official website

Sinarcas is a municipality in the Valencian Community (province of Valencia) and is located about one hour's drive inland from the city of Valencia. Primarily an agricultural town, local produce includes grapes, lavender and wheat. There is also a large battery chicken egg production locally.

== Geography ==
The area is surrounded by pine forest and mediterranean scrub including lavender on the hillsides and gets very dry in the Summer. The altitude is around 1000 m and so it is consequently relatively cool in Summer compared with more coastal locations.

This sleepy town has suffered from the emigration of the younger demographic to towns where there is more work to be found.

== Cuisine ==
Local specialities include casseroled Lamb knees and a heavy soup containing home-made pasta and beans.

== Amenities ==
- Municipal swimming pool
- Church
- Watersports and canyoning in Benagéber
- Internet facilities in library
- Post office
- Three shops
- Several bars
- Primary School
- Pharmacy
- Fire Station

== See also ==
- Sierra de Utiel
- List of municipalities in Valencia
