= Calderón (Requena) =

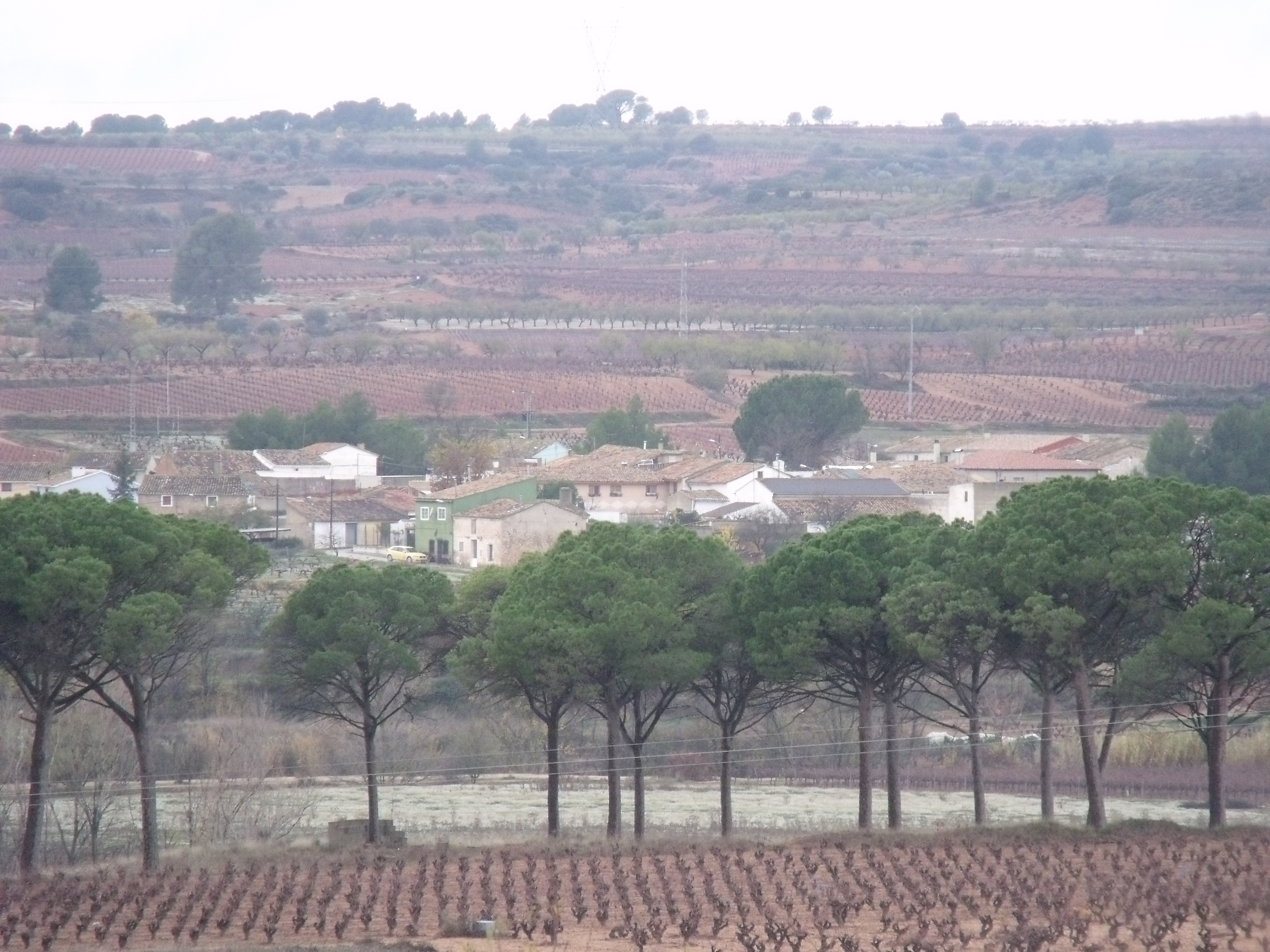
- Interactive map of Calderón
- Country: Spain
- Province: Valencia
- Municipality: Requena
- Comarca: Requena-Utiel
- Elevation: 717 m (2,352 ft)

Population (2015)
  - Total: 32

Calderón is a village in Valencia, Spain. It is part of the municipality of Requena and belongs to the comarca Requena-Utiel.
