= Requena, Spain =

Requena
- Municipality
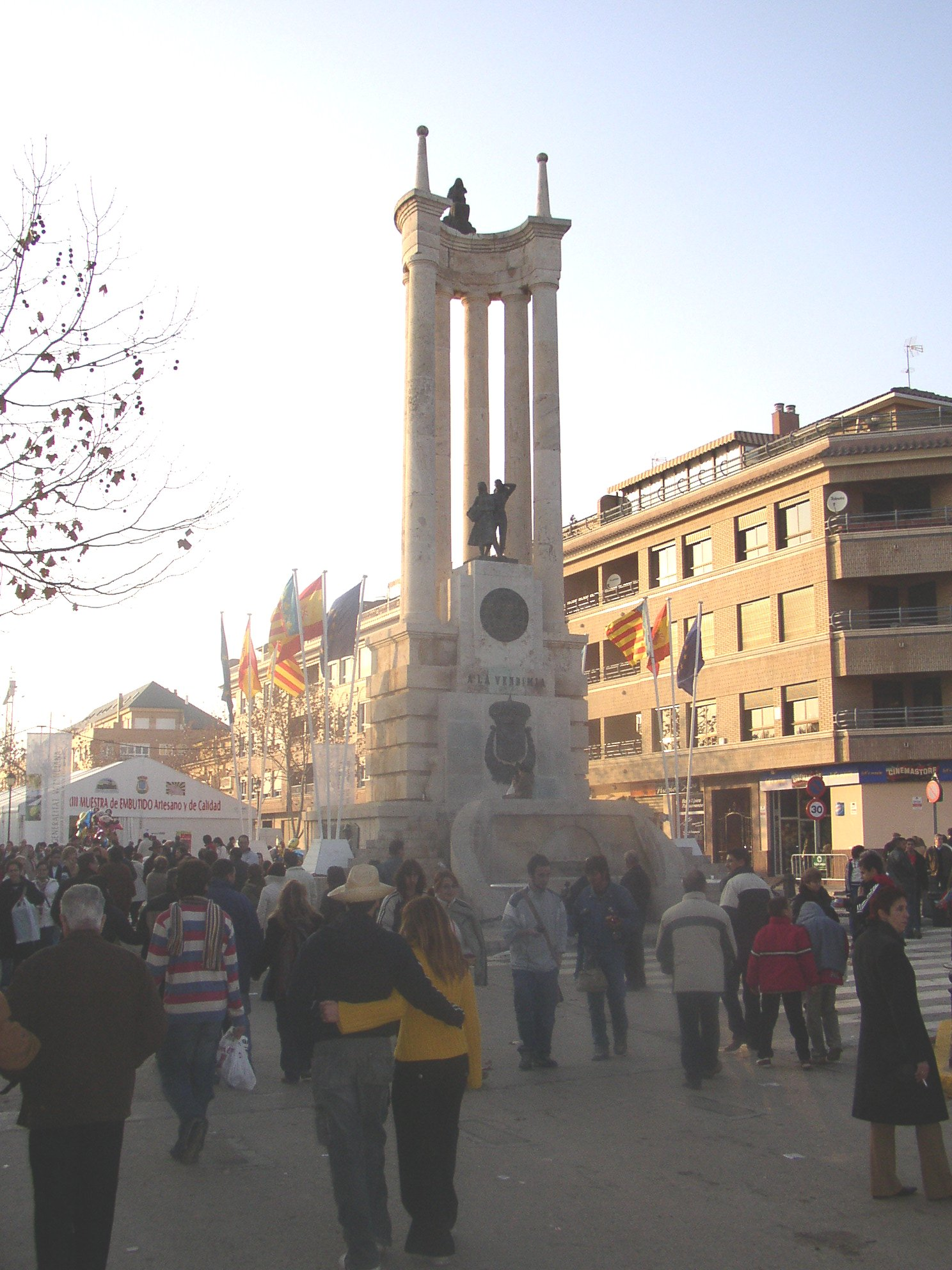

- Flag Coat of arms

- Location in Spain
- Coordinates: 39°29′10″N 1°6′6″W
- Country: Spain
- Autonomous community: Valencian Community
- Province: Valencia
- Comarca: Requena-Utiel
- Judicial district: Requena
- Founded: 7th century BC

Government
  - Alcaldesa: Rocío Cortés Grao (2023) (PP)

Area
  - Total: 814.2 km^{2} (314.4 sq mi)
- Elevation: 692 m (2,270 ft)

Population (2025-01-01)
  - Total: 20,982
  - Density: 25.77/km^{2} (66.74/sq mi)
- Demonym: Requenense
- Time zone: UTC+1 (CET)
  - Summer (DST): UTC+2 (CEST)
- Postal code: 46340
- Official language(s): Spanish
- Website: Official website

Requena is a municipality in eastern Spain, in the province of Valencia, located on the left bank of the river Magro.

== History ==
The town used to be a Moorish fortress, occupying a strong position in the mountainous region of Las Cabrillas (1000 metres). It is dominated by the ancient citadel of the Moors, and still has traces of the original town walls. Requena was the target of an unsuccessful crusade in 1219–1220.

There are three ancient parish churches; San Nicolás, the oldest, dates back to the 13th century, but was partly restored in 1727. Near the town are the sulphurous springs of Fuentepodrida.

== List of settlements included in the municipality ==
- Barrio Arroyo
- Calderón
- Campo Arcís
- Casas de Cuadra
- Casas de Eufemia
- Casas de Sotos
- Casas del Río
- El Azagador
- El Derramador
- El Pontón
- El Rebollar
- Fuen Vich
- Hortunas
- La Portera
- Las Nogueras
- Los Cojos
- Los Duques
- Los Pedrones
- Los Ruices
- Los Isidros
- Penén de Albosa
- San Antonio
- San Juan
- Roma
- Villar de Olmos

== Demography ==
Demographic evolution of Requena
1900	1910	1920	1930	1940	1950	1960	1970	1981	1991	2000	2006	2007
16.236	17.658	18.818	17.650	19.422	20.253	18.933	17.840	18.152	17.014	19.092	20.216	20.440

== Notable places of interest ==
- Iglesia del Carmen, Requena
- San Sebastian, Requena

== See also ==
- List of municipalities in Valencia
