= Requena-Utiel =

Requena-Utiel Plana d'Utiel
- Comarca
- Country: Spain
- Autonomous community: Valencian Community
- Province: València / Valencia
- Capital and largest city: Requena
- Municipalities: 9 municipalities: Camporrobles, Caudete de las Fuentes, Chera, Fuenterrobles, Requena, Sinarcas, Utiel, Venta del Moro, Villargordo del Cabriel

Area
  - Total: 1,721.03 km^{2} (664.49 sq mi)

Population (2006)
  - Total: 39,053
  - Density: 22.692/km^{2} (58.771/sq mi)
- Time zone: UTC+1 (CET)
  - Summer (DST): UTC+2 (CEST)

Requena-Utiel (Spanish: [reˈkena uˈtjel]; Valencian: Plana d'Utiel [ˈplana ðutiˈɛl]) is a comarca currently in the province of Valencia, Valencian Community, Spain. The area was transferred to this province in 1851, as a result of a reform of the 1833 territorial division of Spain; before that it was a part of the Crown of Castile and of the former province of Cuenca. The inhabitants of the comarca have traditionally been monolingual in Spanish, i.e. they are not Valencian speakers.

Chera, now officially included in Requena-Utiel according to the current administrative division pattern of the Valencian Community, was geographically and historically part of Los Serranos comarca.

== Municipalities ==
Map of Requena-Utiel

- Camporrobles
- Caudete de las Fuentes
- Chera
- Fuenterrobles
- Requena
- Sinarcas
- Utiel
- Venta del Moro
- Villargordo del Cabriel

== Transport ==
The comarca is served by Requena-Utiel railway station on the AVE high-speed rail line from Madrid to Valencia. The C-3 line of the Cercanías Valencia commuter rail network makes stops in Requena, San Antonio de Requena and Utiel.

== See also ==
- Manchuela
- Los Serranos
