= Villar del Infantado =

Villar del Infantado, Spain
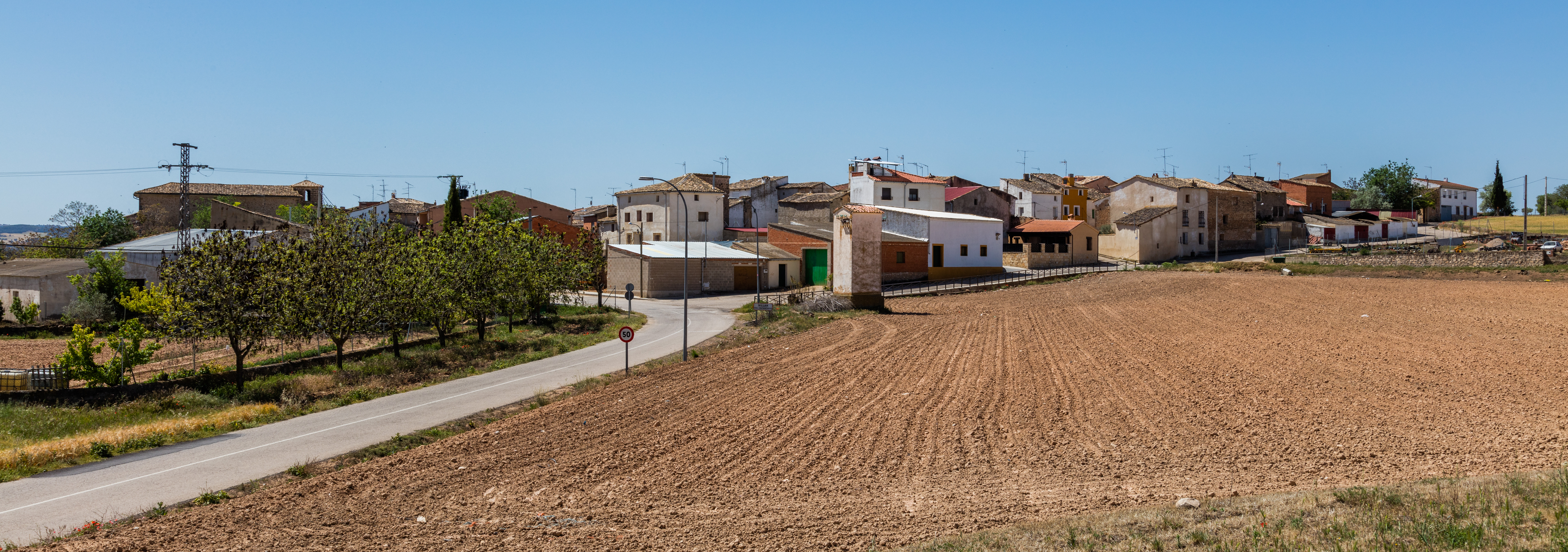
- Villar del Infantado, Cuenca, Spain

- Location within Spain Location within Castilla-La Mancha
- Coordinates: 40°27′N 2°29′W
- Country: Spain
- Autonomous community: Castile-La Mancha
- Province: Cuenca
- Municipality: Villar del Infantado

Area
  - Total: 21 km^{2} (8.1 sq mi)

Population (2025-01-01)
  - Total: 34
  - Density: 1.6/km^{2} (4.2/sq mi)
- Time zone: UTC+1 (CET)
  - Summer (DST): UTC+2 (CEST)

Villar del Infantado is a municipality located in the province of Cuenca, Castile-La Mancha, Spain. According to the 2004 census (INE), the municipality has a population of 48 inhabitants.
