= Province of Cuenca =

Province of Spain

Province of Cuenca Provincia de Cuenca
- Province
- Flag Coat of arms

- Location of the Province of Cuenca in Spain
- Coordinates: 40°00′N 2°00′W
- Country: Spain
- Autonomous community: Castilla–La Mancha
- Capital: Cuenca
- Municipalities: 238 (list)

Government
  - Type: Diputación
  - Body: Provincial Deputation of Cuenca
  - President: Benjamín Prieto (PP)

Area
  - Total: 17,121.15 km^{2} (6,610.51 sq mi)
  - Rank: 5th in Spain
- 3.4% of Spain
- Highest elevation (Mogorrita): 1,865 m (6,119 ft)

Population (2025)
  - Total: 199,859
  - Rank: 44th in Spain
  - Density: 11.6732/km^{2} (30.2335/sq mi)
- 0.4% of Spain
- Demonym: Conquense
- Time zone: UTC+1 (CET)
  - Summer (DST): UTC+2 (CEST)
- Website: dipucuenca.es

Cuenca (Spanish: [ˈkweŋka]) is a province of Spain, in the eastern part of the autonomous community of Castilla-La Mancha. Its capital is the city of Cuenca.

It has a population of 199,859 in an area of 17,121.15 square kilometres (6,610.51 sq mi) across its 238 municipalities.

== History ==
In 1851, Cuenca lost Requena-Utiel to the neighbouring Valencia Province, with which it was developing commercial ties. Nevertheless, Requena-Utiel remained Spanish-speaking (rather than Catalan), while the loss of its most dynamic region left the province of Cuenca relatively underdeveloped economically.

== Geography ==
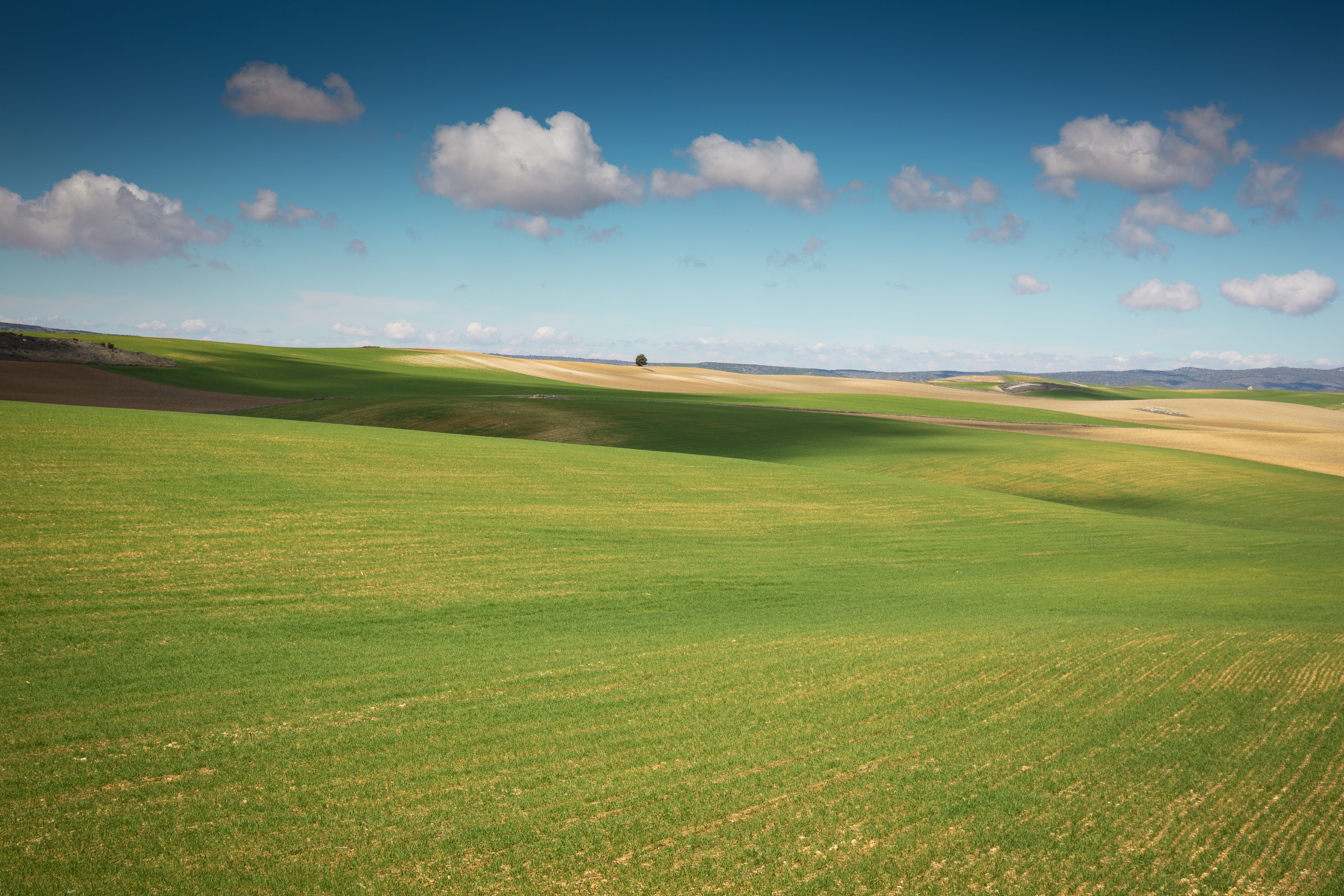
Landscape in the province

The province is bordered by the provinces of Valencia (including its exclave Rincón de Ademuz), Albacete, Ciudad Real, Toledo, Madrid, Guadalajara, and Teruel. The northeastern side of the province is in the mountainous Sistema Ibérico area.

Besides Cuenca, other large towns and municipalities include Tarancón, San Clemente, Quintanar del Rey, Huete, Villanueva de la Jara, Motilla del Palancar, Mota del Cuervo, La Almarcha, and Las Pedroñeras. The highest point in the province is the Mogorrita peak (1865 m).

== Municipalities ==
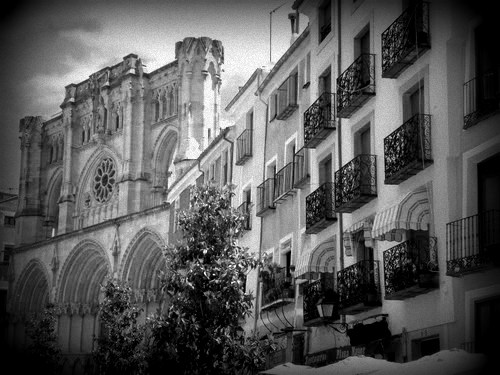
Cuenca Cathedral (built from 1182 to 1270), located in the city of Cuenca.

The province has 238 municipalities:

- Abia de la Obispalía
- Alarcón
- Albaladejo del Cuende
- Albalate de las Nogueras
- Albendea
- Alcalá de la Vega
- Alcantud
- Alcázar del Rey
- Alcohujate
- Alconchel de la Estrella
- Algarra
- Aliaguilla
- Almendros
- Almodóvar del Pinar
- Almonacid del Marquesado
- Altarejos
- Arandilla del Arroyo
- Arcas
- Arcos de la Sierra
- Arguisuelas
- Arrancacepas
- Atalaya del Cañavate
- Barajas de Melo
- Barchín del Hoyo
- Bascuñana de San Pedro
- Beamud
- Belinchón
- Belmonte
- Belmontejo
- Beteta
- Boniches
- Buciegas
- Buenache de Alarcón
- Buenache de la Sierra
- Buendía
- Campillo de Altobuey
- Campillos-Paravientos
- Campillos-Sierra
- Campos del Paraíso
- Cañada del Hoyo
- Cañada Juncosa
- Canalejas del Arroyo
- Cañamares
- Cañaveras
- Cañaveruelas
- Cañete
- Cañizares
- Carboneras de Guadazaón
- Cardenete
- Carrascosa de Haro
- Carrascosa
- Casas de Benítez
- Casas de Fernando Alonso
- Casas de Garcimolina
- Casas de Guijarro
- Casas de Haro
- Casas de los Pinos
- Casasimarro
- Castejón
- Castillejo de Iniesta
- Castillejo-Sierra
- Castillo de Garcimuñoz
- Castillo-Albaráñez
- Cervera del Llano
- Chillarón de Cuenca
- Chumillas
- Cuenca
- Cueva del Hierro
- El Acebrón
- El Cañavate
- El Herrumblar
- El Hito
- El Pedernoso
- El Peral
- El Picazo
- El Pozuelo
- El Provencio
- El Valle de Altomira
- Enguídanos
- Fresneda de Altarejos
- Fresneda de la Sierra
- Fuente de Pedro Naharro
- Fuentelespino de Haro
- Fuentelespino de Moya
- Fuentenava de Jábaga
- Fuentes
- Fuertescusa
- Gabaldón
- Garaballa
- Gascueña
- Graja de Campalbo
- Graja de Iniesta
- Henarejos
- Honrubia
- Hontanaya
- Hontecillas
- Horcajo de Santiago
- Huélamo
- Huelves
- Huérguina
- Huerta de la Obispalía
- Huerta del Marquesado
- Huete
- Iniesta
- La Alberca de Záncara
- La Almarcha
- La Cierva
- La Frontera
- La Hinojosa
- La Parra de las Vegas
- La Peraleja
- La Pesquera
- Laguna del Marquesado
- Lagunaseca
- Landete
- Las Majadas
- Las Mesas
- Las Pedroñeras
- Las Valeras
- Ledaña
- Leganiel
- Los Hinojosos
- Los Valdecolmenas
- Mariana
- Masegosa
- Minglanilla
- Mira
- Monreal del Llano
- Montalbanejo
- Montalbo
- Monteagudo de las Salinas
- Mota de Altarejos
- Mota del Cuervo
- Motilla del Palancar
- Moya
- Narboneta
- Olivares de Júcar
- Olmeda de la Cuesta
- Olmeda del Rey
- Olmedilla de Alarcón
- Olmedilla de Eliz
- Osa de la Vega
- Pajarón
- Pajaroncillo
- Palomares del Campo
- Palomera
- Paracuellos
- Paredes
- Pinarejo
- Pineda de Gigüela
- Piqueras del Castillo
- Portalrubio de Guadamejud
- Portilla
- Poyatos
- Pozoamargo
- Pozorrubielos de la Mancha
- Pozorrubio de Santiago
- Priego
- Puebla de Almenara
- Puebla del Salvador
- Quintanar del Rey
- Rada de Haro
- Reíllo
- Rozalén del Monte
- Saceda-Trasierra
- Saelices
- Salinas del Manzano
- Salmeroncillos
- Salvacañete
- San Clemente
- San Lorenzo de la Parrilla
- San Martín de Boniches
- San Pedro Palmiches
- Santa Cruz de Moya
- Santa María de los Llanos
- Santa María del Campo Rus
- Santa María del Val
- Sisante
- Solera de Gabaldón
- Sotorribas
- Talayuelas
- Tarancón
- Tébar
- Tejadillos
- Tinajas
- Torralba
- Torrejoncillo del Rey
- Torrubia del Campo
- Torrubia del Castillo
- Tragacete
- Tresjuncos
- Tribaldos
- Uclés
- Uña
- Valdemeca
- Valdemorillo de la Sierra
- Valdemoro-Sierra
- Valdeolivas
- Valdetórtola
- Valhermoso de la Fuente
- Valsalobre
- Valverde de Júcar
- Valverdejo
- Vara de Rey
- Vega del Codorno
- Vellisca
- Villaconejos de Trabaque
- Villaescusa de Haro
- Villagarcía del Llano
- Villalba de la Sierra
- Villalba del Rey
- Villalgordo del Marquesado
- Villalpardo
- Villamayor de Santiago
- Villanueva de Guadamejud
- Villanueva de la Jara
- Villar de Cañas
- Villar de Domingo García
- Villar de la Encina
- Villar de Olalla
- Villar del Humo
- Villar del Infantado
- Villar y Velasco
- Villarejo de Fuentes
- Villarejo de la Peñuela
- Villarejo-Periesteban
- Villares del Saz
- Villarrubio
- Villarta
- Villas de la Ventosa
- Villaverde y Pasaconsol
- Víllora
- Vindel
- Yémeda
- Zafra de Záncara
- Zafrilla
- Zarza de Tajo
- Zarzuela

== Demographics ==
As of 2025, the population is 199,859, of which 50.5% are male, and 49.5% are female. Minors make up 14.7% of the population, and seniors make up 23.6%.

Historical population

Year	Pop.	±%
1842	213,313	—
1857	230,261	+7.9%
1877	238,991	+3.8%
1887	245,699	+2.8%
1900	250,755	+2.1%
1910	271,748	+8.4%
1920	287,507	+5.8%
1930	314,633	+9.4%
1940	340,549	+8.2%

Year	Pop.	±%
1950	344,033	+1.0%
1960	328,554	−4.5%
1970	251,619	−23.4%
1981	215,975	−14.2%
1991	205,198	−5.0%
2001	200,346	−2.4%
2011	215,165	+7.4%
2021	196,510	−8.7%

Source: INE

=== Immigration ===
As of 2025, immigrants make up 16.3% of the population. The 5 largest foreign countries of birth are Romania, Morocco, Colombia, Ecuador, and Venezuela.
