= La Alberca de Záncara =

- Municipality
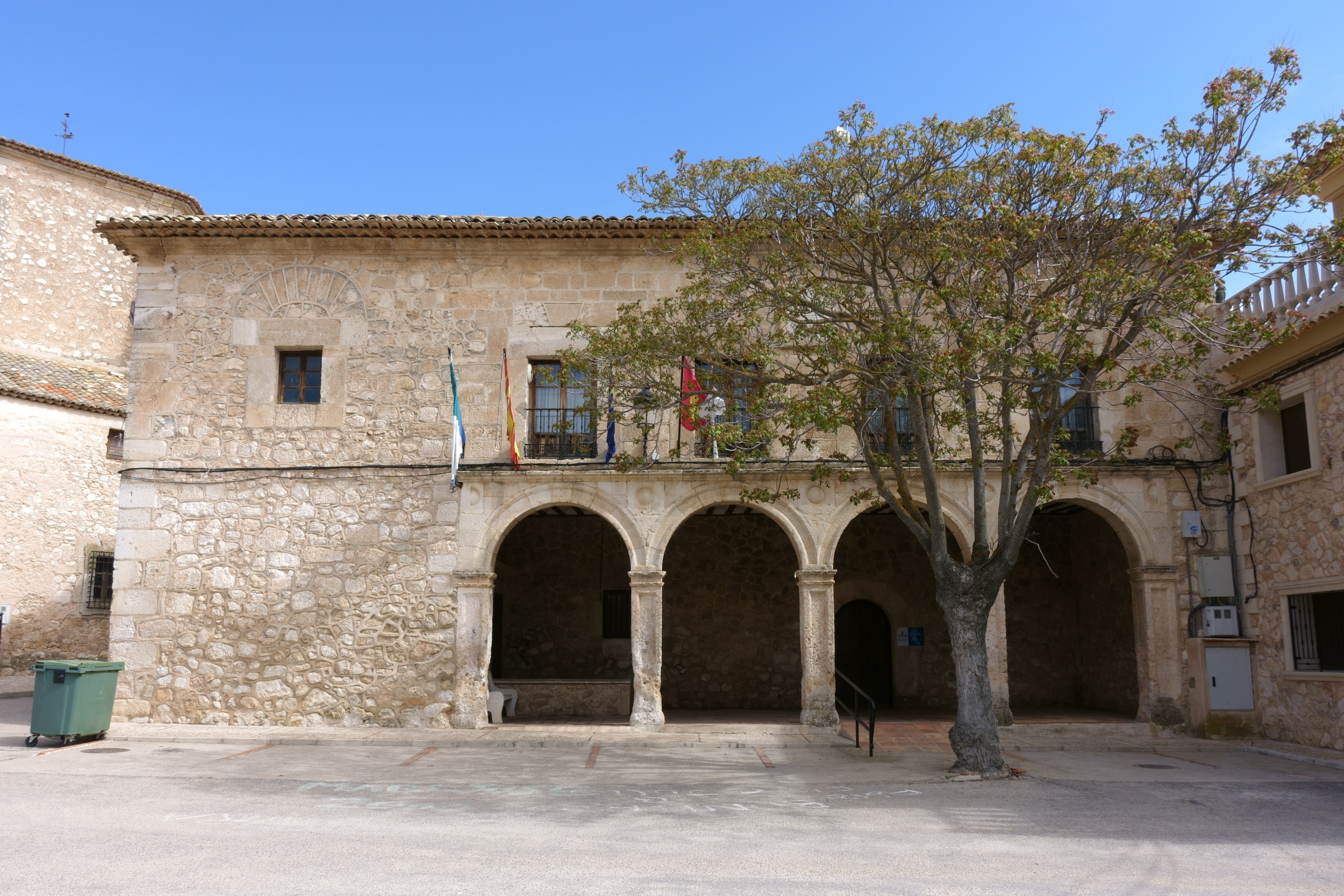
- Town hall

- Flag Coat of arms

- Location within Spain Location within Castilla-La Mancha
- Coordinates: 39°31′N 2°29′W
- Country: Spain
- Autonomous community: Castile-La Mancha
- Province: Cuenca

Population (2025-01-01)
  - Total: 1,504
- Time zone: UTC+1 (CET)
  - Summer (DST): UTC+2 (CEST)

La Alberca de Záncara is a municipality in Cuenca, Castile-La Mancha, Spain. It has a population of 1,780.

== Location and climate ==
La Alberca de Záncara is located in a predominantly flat agricultural landscape in Castilla-La Mancha, about 85 km southwest of Cuenca, the provincial capital, and about 90 km southeast of Albacete. The town lies at an elevation of approximately 820 m above sea level. It has a temperate to mild climate, with most of its annual precipitation, around 450 mm, occurring during the winter half of the year.
