= Rada de Haro =

- municipality
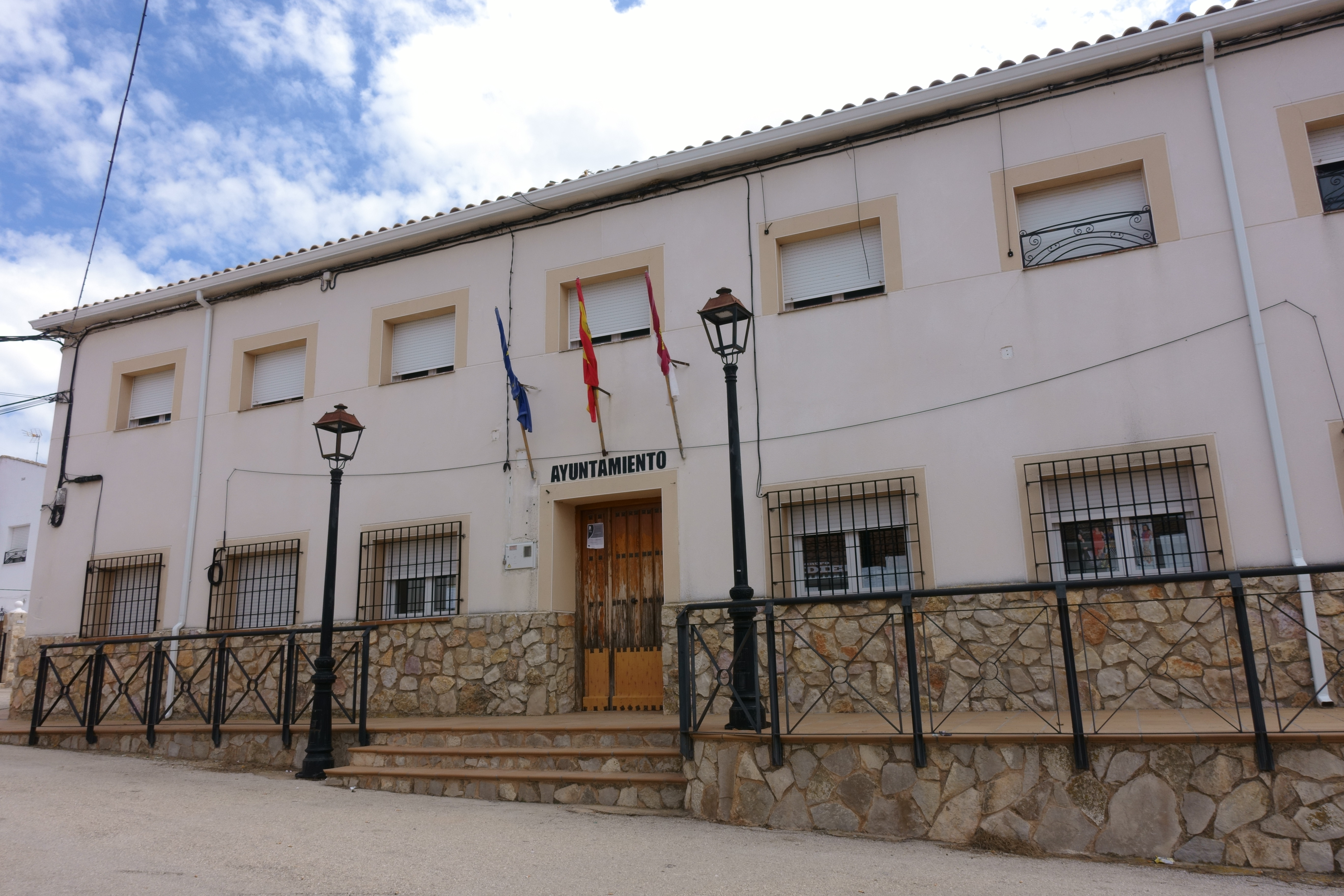
- Town hall building of Rada de Haro municipal

- Location within Spain Location within Castilla-La Mancha
- Coordinates: 39°34′N 2°37′W
- Country: Spain
- Autonomous community: Castile-La Mancha
- Province: Cuenca
- Municipality: Rada de Haro

Area
  - Total: 32 km^{2} (12 sq mi)

Population (2025-01-01)
  - Total: 49
  - Density: 1.5/km^{2} (4.0/sq mi)
- Time zone: UTC+1 (CET)
  - Summer (DST): UTC+2 (CEST)

Rada de Haro is a municipality located in the province of Cuenca, Castile-La Mancha, Spain. According to the 2004 census (INE), the municipality has a population of 62 inhabitants.
