= Bascuñana de San Pedro =

Municipality in the province of Cuenca, Spain

- Municipality
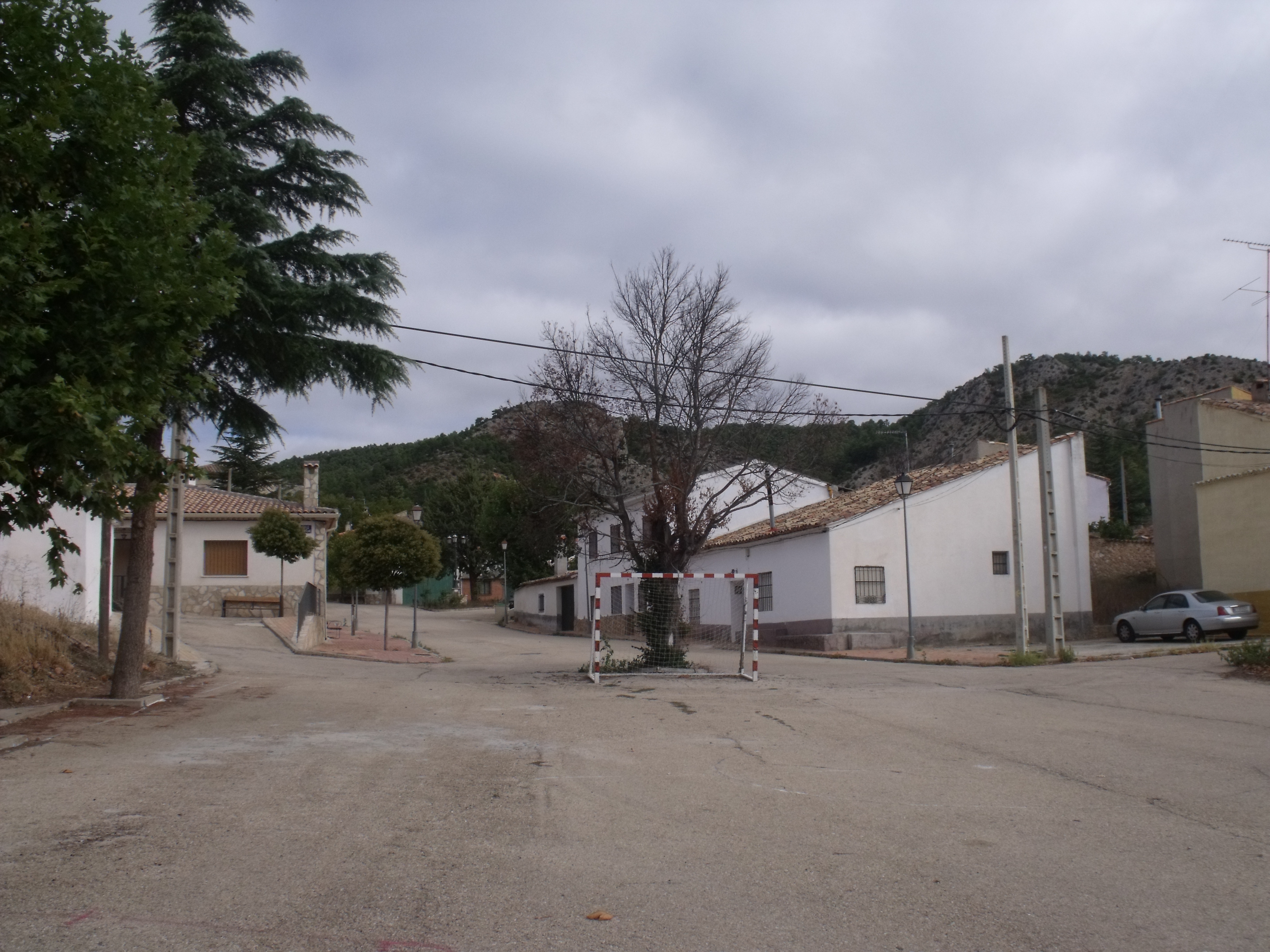

- Location within Spain Location within Castilla-La Mancha
- Coordinates: 40°12′48″N 2°13′41″W
- Country: Spain
- Autonomous community: Castile-La Mancha
- Province: Cuenca

Population (2025-01-01 now 2023)
  - Total: 23 now 24
- Time zone: UTC+1 (CET)
  - Summer (DST): UTC+2 (CEST)

Bascuñana de San Pedro is a municipality located in the province of Cuenca, Castile-La Mancha, Spain. It has a population of 24 (2023).
