= Santa María del Val =

Santa María del Val, Spain
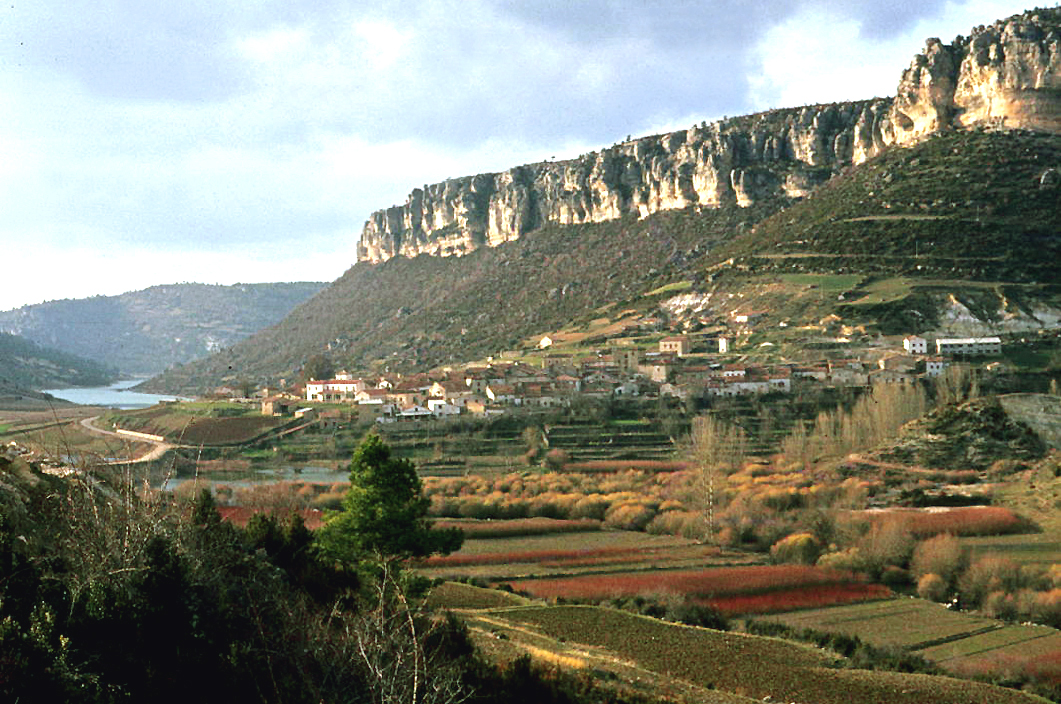
- View of Santa María del Val

- Location within Spain Location within Castilla-La Mancha
- Coordinates: 40°30′N 2°02′W
- Country: Spain
- Autonomous community: Castile-La Mancha
- Province: Cuenca
- Municipality: Santa María del Val

Area
  - Total: 46 km^{2} (18 sq mi)

Population (2025-01-01)
  - Total: 55
  - Density: 1.2/km^{2} (3.1/sq mi)
- Time zone: UTC+1 (CET)
  - Summer (DST): UTC+2 (CEST)

Santa María del Val is a municipality located in the province of Cuenca, Castile-La Mancha, Spain. According to the 2004 census (INE), the municipality has a population of 102 inhabitants.
