= Villar de la Encina =

Villar de la Encina, Spain
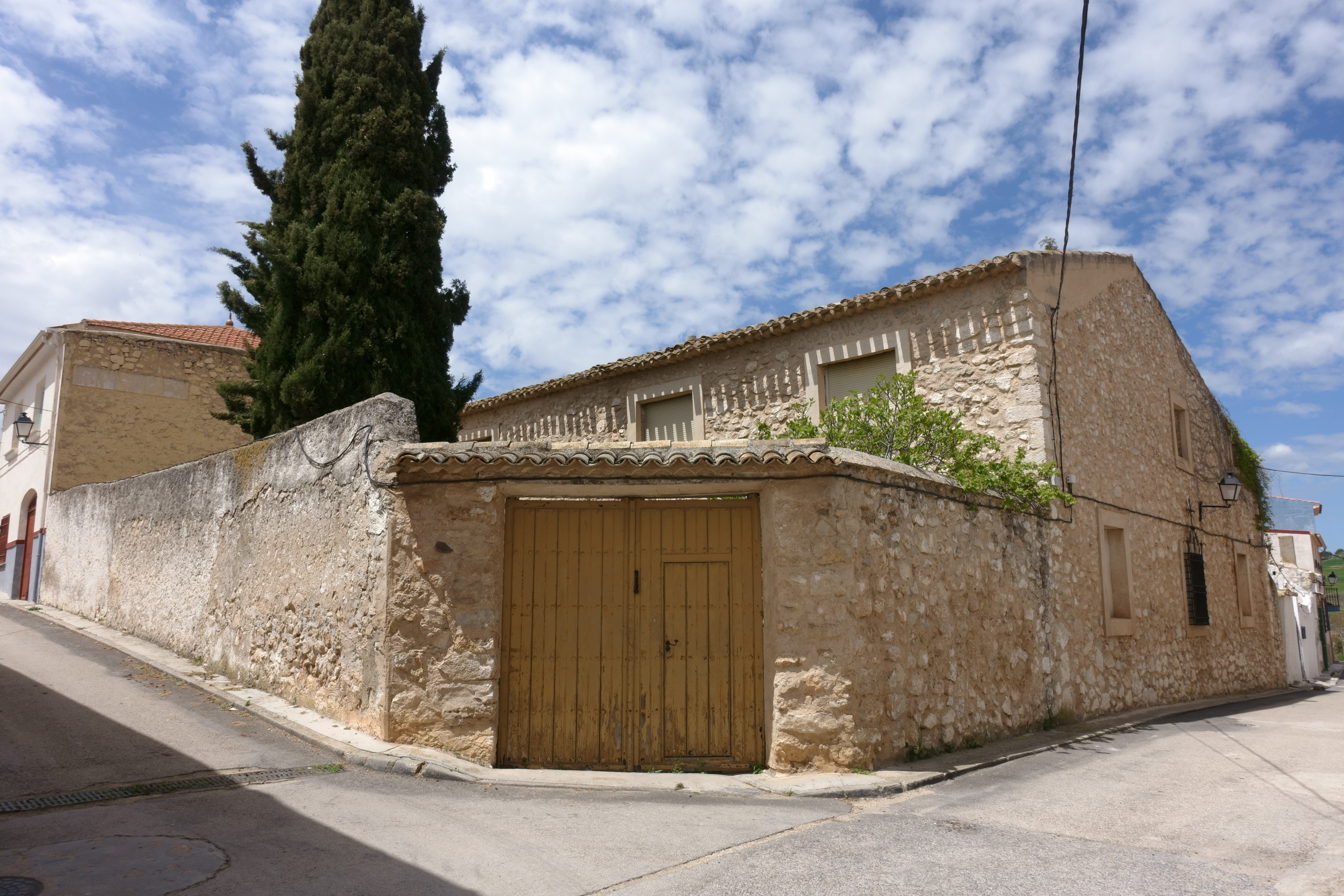

- Coat of arms

- Location within Spain Location within Castilla-La Mancha
- Coordinates: 39°38′N 2°31′W
- Country: Spain
- Autonomous community: Castile-La Mancha
- Province: Cuenca
- Municipality: Villar de la Encina

Area
  - Total: 49 km^{2} (19 sq mi)

Population (2025-01-01)
  - Total: 146
  - Density: 3.0/km^{2} (7.7/sq mi)
- Time zone: UTC+1 (CET)
  - Summer (DST): UTC+2 (CEST)

Villar de la Encina is a municipality located in the province of Cuenca, Castile-La Mancha, Spain. According to the 2004 census (INE), the municipality has a population of 220 inhabitants.
