= Reíllo =

Reíllo, Spain
- municipality
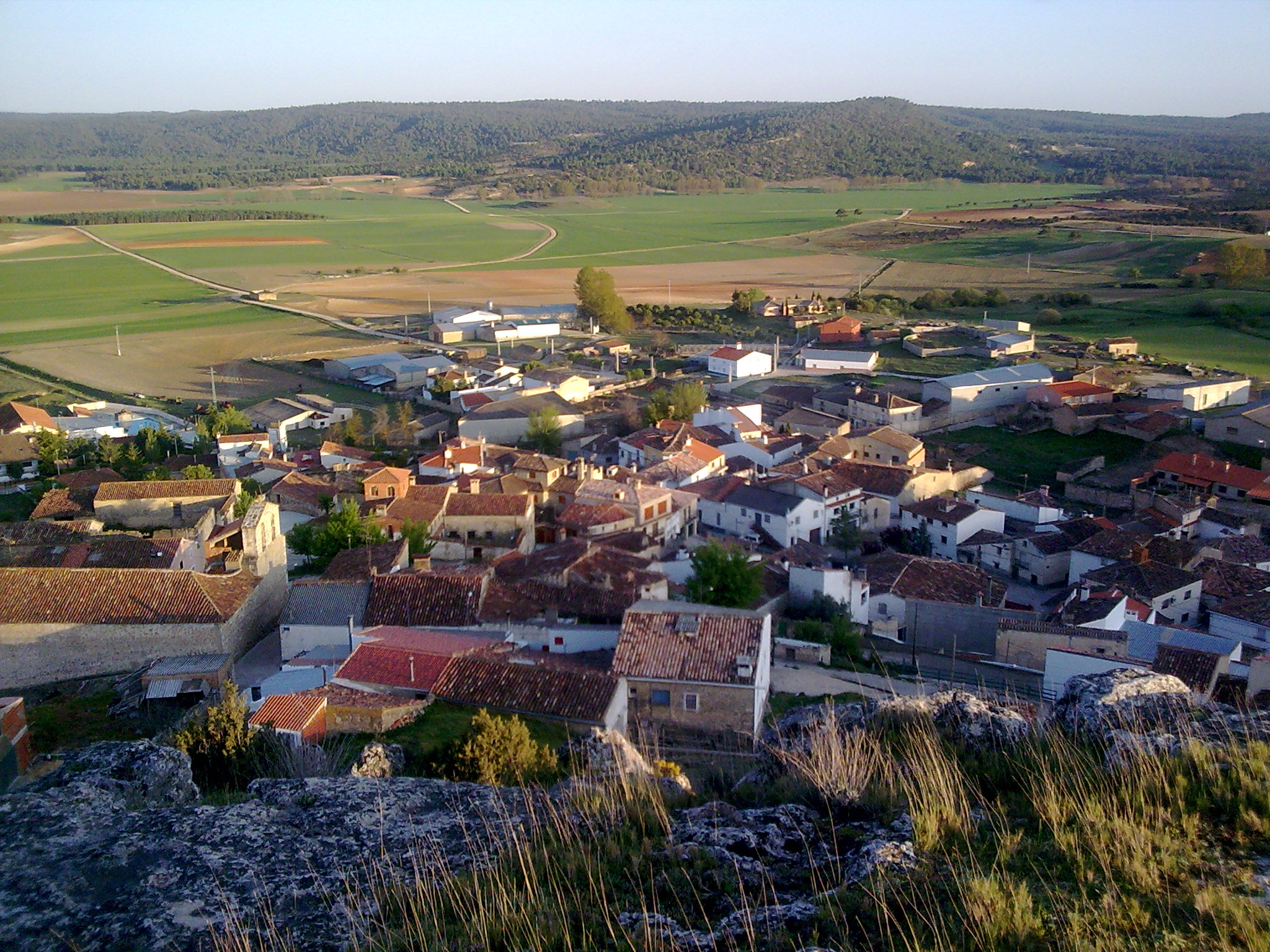

- Coat of arms

- Location within Spain Location within Castilla-La Mancha
- Country: Spain
- Autonomous community: Castile-La Mancha
- Province: Cuenca
- Municipality: Reíllo

Area
  - Total: 81 km^{2} (31 sq mi)

Population (2025-01-01)
  - Total: 106
  - Density: 1.3/km^{2} (3.4/sq mi)
- Time zone: UTC+1 (CET)
  - Summer (DST): UTC+2 (CEST)

Reíllo is a municipality located in the province of Cuenca, Castile-La Mancha, Spain. According to the 2004 census (INE), the municipality has a population of 126 inhabitants.
