= Fresneda de la Sierra =

- Municipality
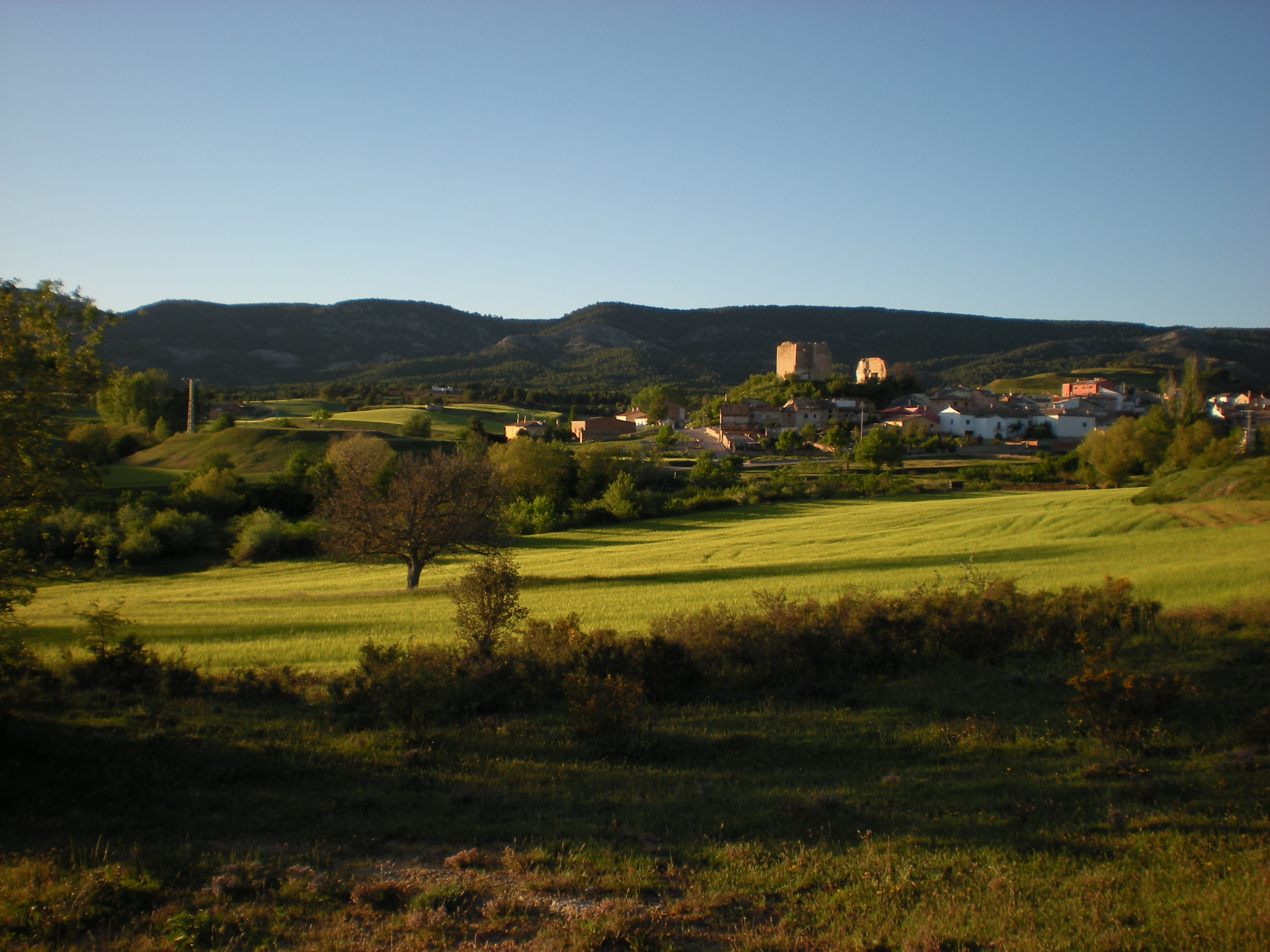
- View of Fresneda de la Sierra, Cuenca, Spain

- Location within Spain Location within Castilla-La Mancha
- Coordinates: 40°24′N 2°08′W
- Country: Spain
- Autonomous community: Castile-La Mancha
- Province: Cuenca

Population (2025-01-01)
  - Total: 42
- Time zone: UTC+1 (CET)
  - Summer (DST): UTC+2 (CEST)

Fresneda de la Sierra is a municipality in Cuenca, Castile-La Mancha, Spain. It has a population of 72.
