= Villaconejos de Trabaque =

Villaconejos de Trabaque, Spain
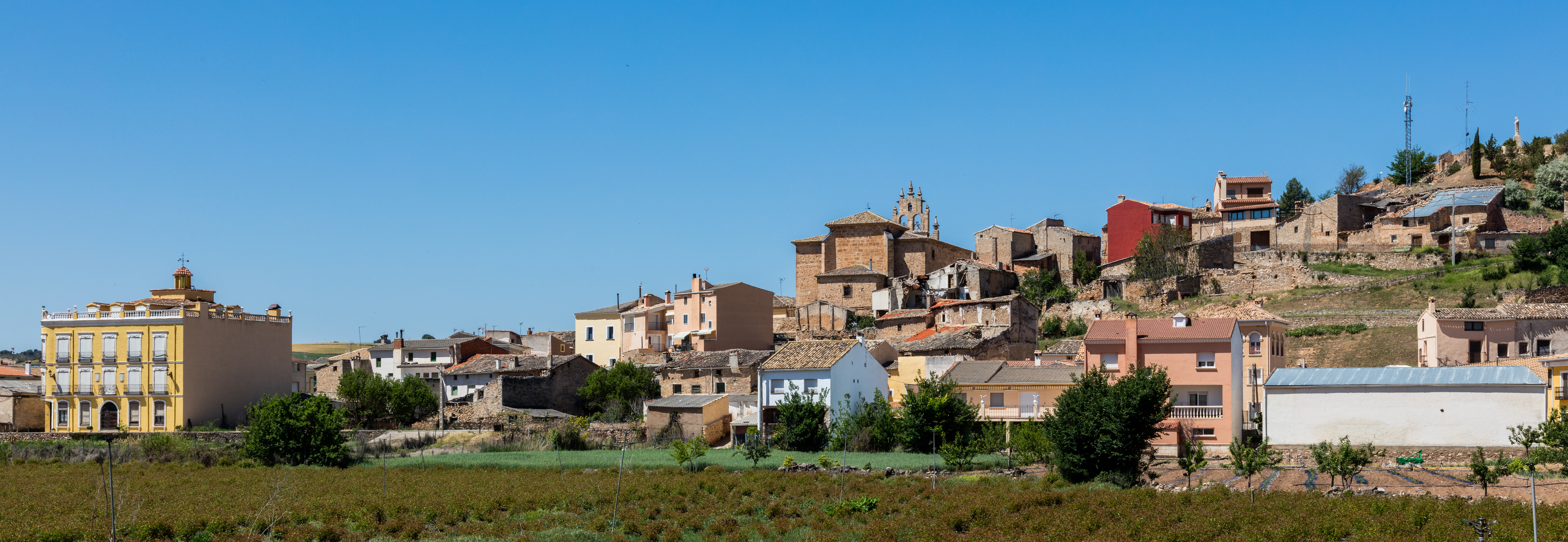

- Flag Coat of arms

- Location within Spain Location within Castilla-La Mancha
- Coordinates: 40°24′N 2°19′W
- Country: Spain
- Autonomous community: Castile-La Mancha
- Province: Cuenca
- Municipality: Villaconejos de Trabaque

Area
  - Total: 31 km^{2} (12 sq mi)

Population (2025-01-01)
  - Total: 325
  - Density: 10/km^{2} (27/sq mi)
- Time zone: UTC+1 (CET)
  - Summer (DST): UTC+2 (CEST)

Villaconejos de Trabaque is a municipality located in the province of Cuenca, Castile-La Mancha, Spain. According to the 2004 census (INE), the municipality has a population of 484 inhabitants.

HISTORY

Villaconejos de Trabaque is created the way it is today in the XVI century. Albalate Bombarrá got divided into two different villages: Albalate de las Nogueras and Villaconejos de Trabaque. Nevertheless, it was previously populated in the Iron Age, mainly by the ethic group known as the Olcades, inhabitants of this area of Celtiberia.
