= Villar y Velasco =

Villar y Velasco, Spain
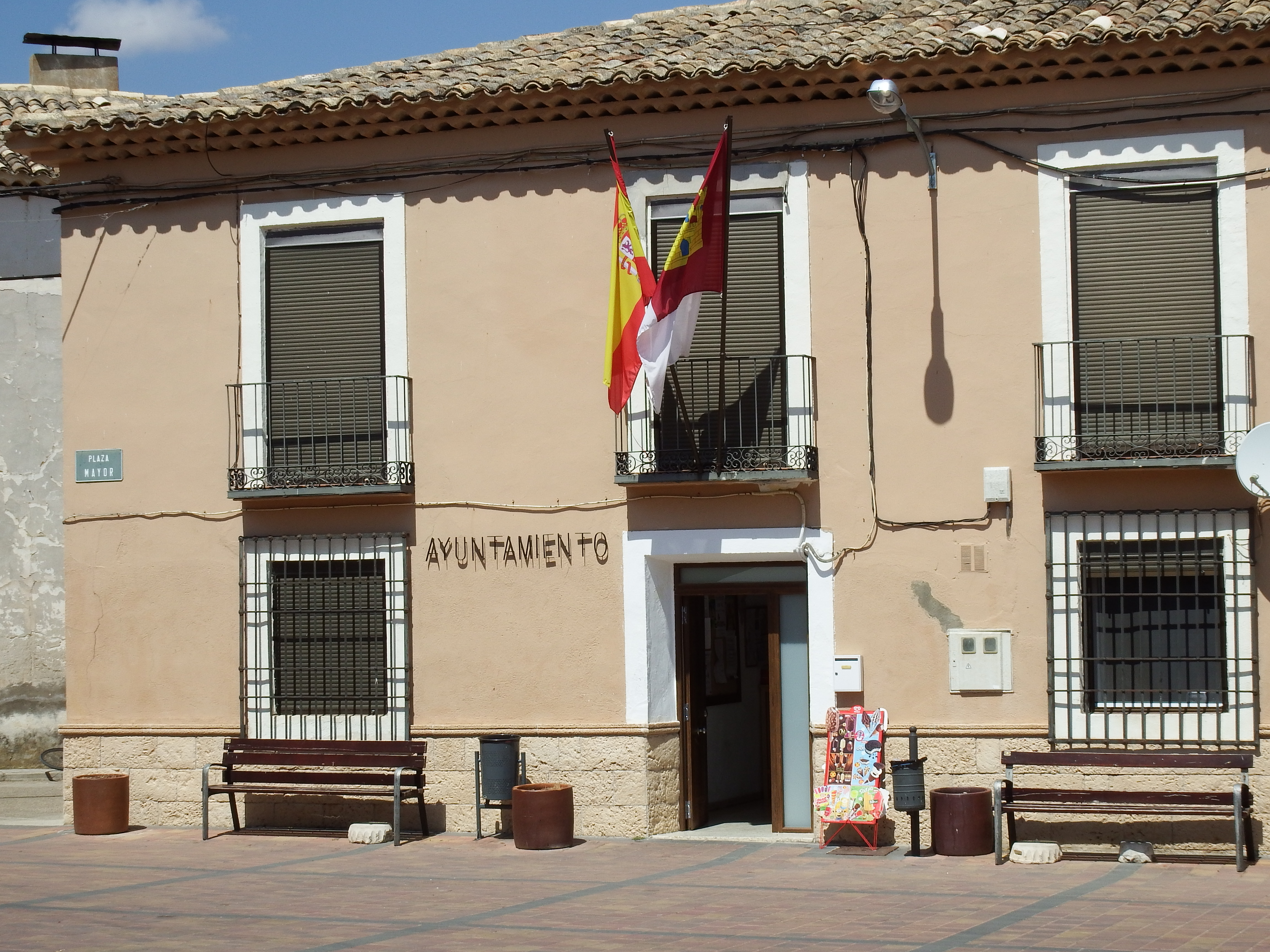
- Town hall of Villar y Velasco

- Location within Spain Location within Castilla-La Mancha
- Country: Spain
- Autonomous community: Castile-La Mancha
- Province: Cuenca
- Municipality: Villar y Velasco

Area
  - Total: 61 km^{2} (24 sq mi)

Population (2025-01-01)
  - Total: 91
  - Density: 1.5/km^{2} (3.9/sq mi)
- Time zone: UTC+1 (CET)
  - Summer (DST): UTC+2 (CEST)

Villar y Velasco is a municipality located in the province of Cuenca, Castile-La Mancha, Spain. According to the 2004 census (INE), the municipality has a population of 114 inhabitants.
