= Castillejo-Sierra =

- Municipality
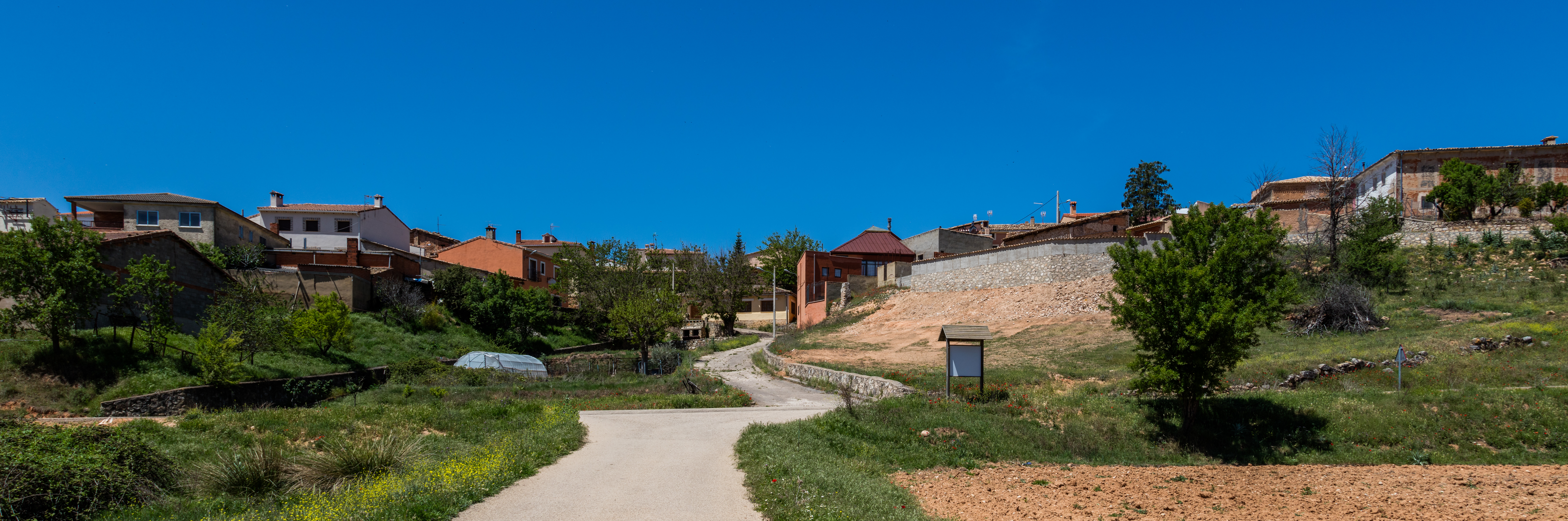

- Location within Spain Location within Castilla-La Mancha
- Coordinates: 40°23′N 2°08′W
- Country: Spain
- Autonomous community: Castile-La Mancha
- Province: Cuenca

Government
  - Mayor: José Luis Herráiz Cantero

Area
  - Total: 30.27 km^{2} (11.69 sq mi)
- Elevation: 990 m (3,250 ft)

Population (2025-01-01)
  - Total: 31
  - Density: 1.0/km^{2} (2.7/sq mi)
- Time zone: UTC+1 (CET)
  - Summer (DST): UTC+2 (CEST)
- Postal code: 16141

Castillejo-Sierra is a municipality in Cuenca, Castile-La Mancha, Spain. It has a population of 48.
