= Gascueña =

- Municipality
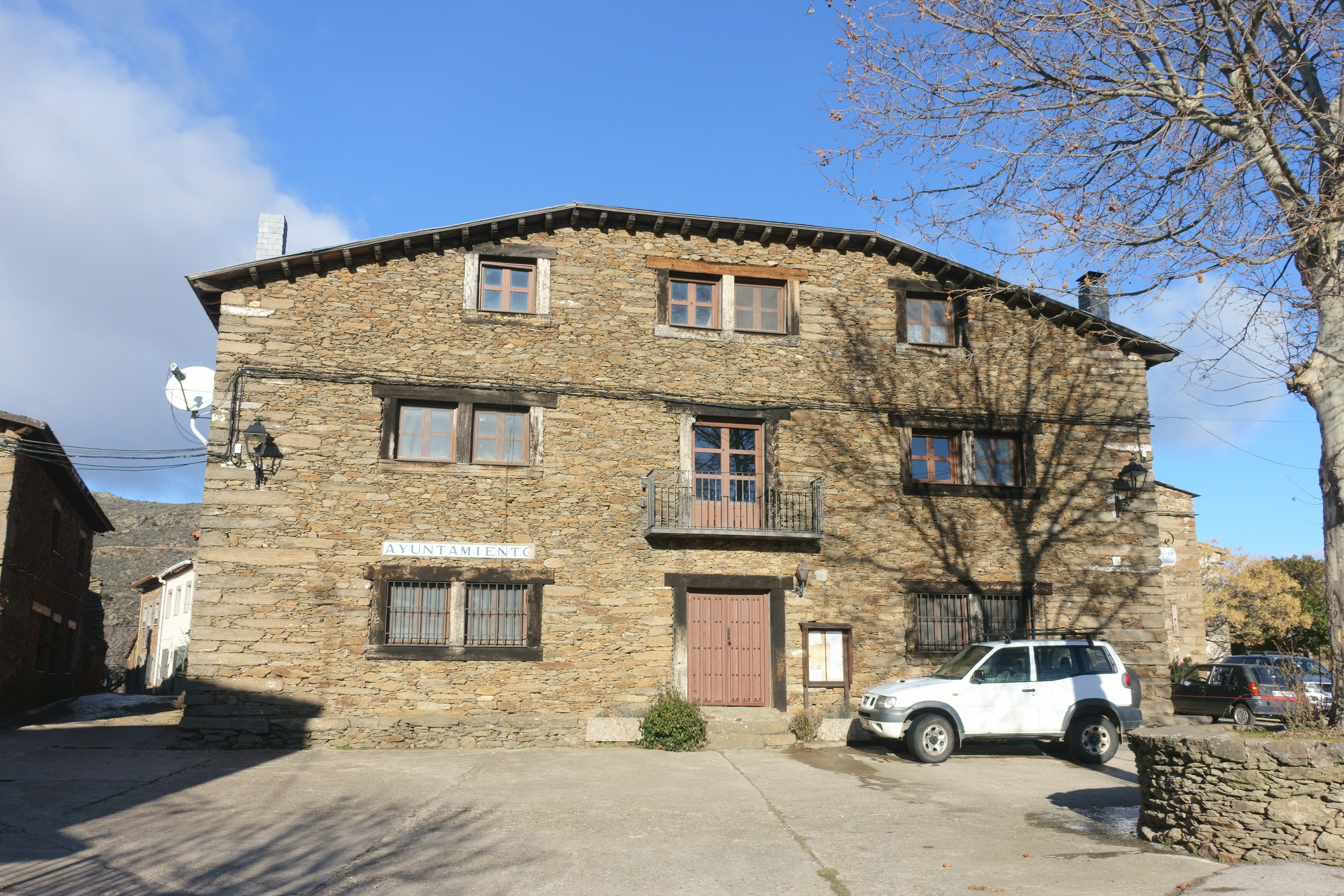
- Town hall

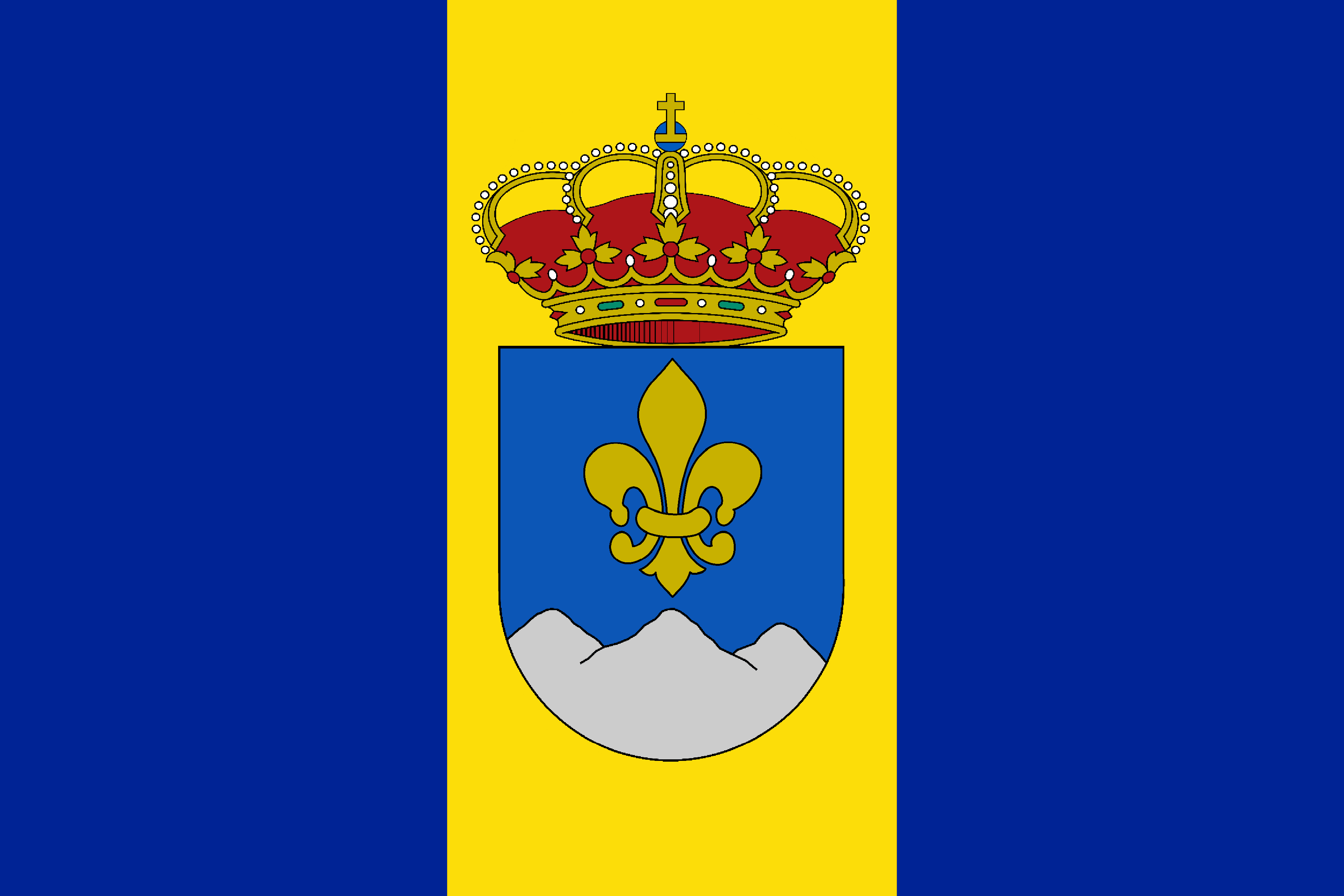
- Flag Coat of arms

- Location within Spain Location within Castilla-La Mancha
- Coordinates: 40°18′N 2°31′W
- Country: Spain
- Autonomous community: Castile-La Mancha
- Province: Cuenca

Population (2025-01-01)
  - Total: 132
- Time zone: UTC+1 (CET)
  - Summer (DST): UTC+2 (CEST)

Gascueña is a municipality in Cuenca, Castile-La Mancha, Spain. It has a population of 158.
