= Fuentenava de Jábaga =

- Municipality
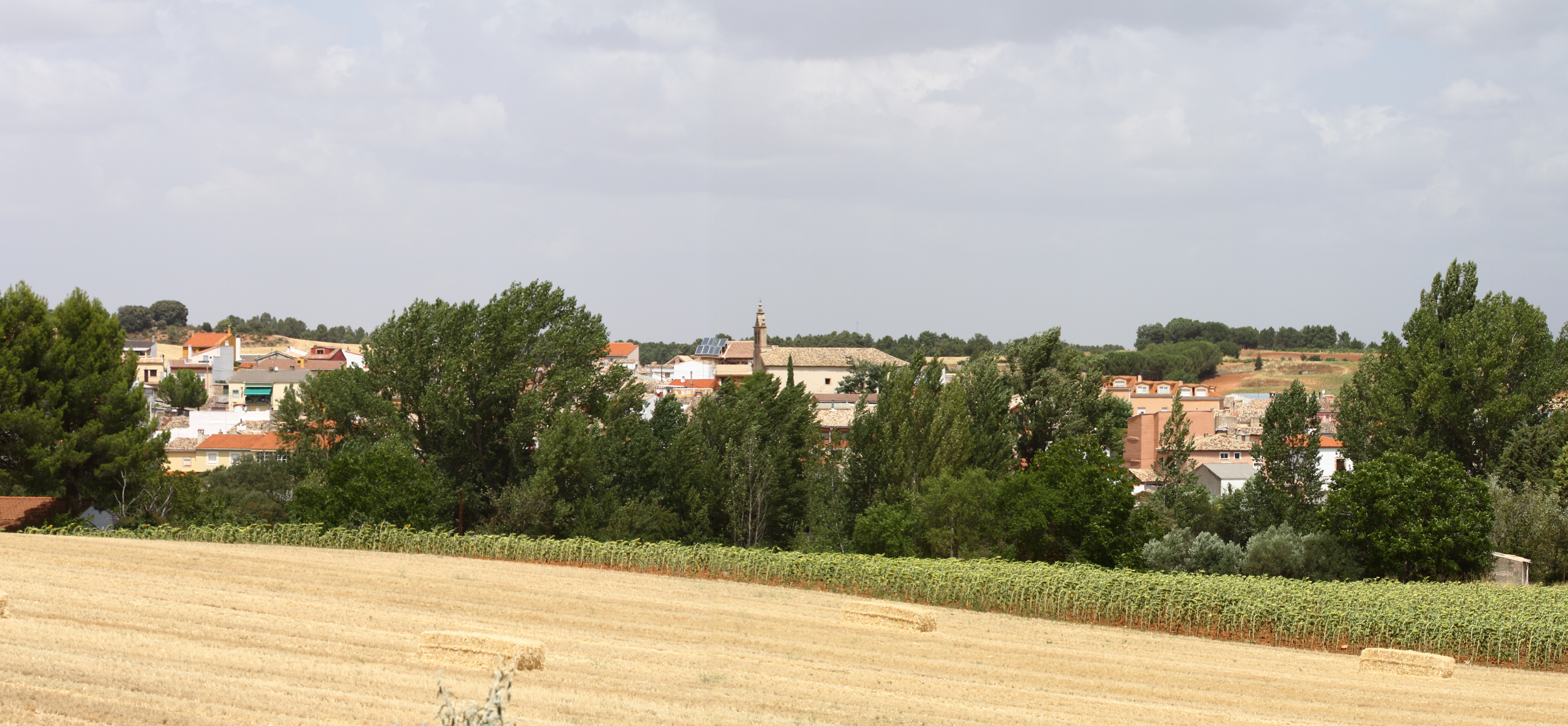
- Overview of Fuentenava de Jábaga town

- Flag Coat of arms

- Location within Spain Location within Castilla-La Mancha
- Coordinates: 40.0864°N 2.26333°W
- Country: Spain
- Autonomous community: Castile-La Mancha
- Province: Cuenca

Area
  - Total: 133.16 km^{2} (51.41 sq mi)

Population (2024)
  - Total: 579
  - Density: 4.35/km^{2} (11.3/sq mi)
- Time zone: UTC+1 (CET)
  - Summer (DST): UTC+2 (CEST)

Fuentenava de Jábaga is a municipality in Cuenca, Castile-La Mancha, Spain. As of 2023, it had a population of 579.
