= Fuertescusa =

Human settlement in Cuenca Province, Castile-La Mancha, Spain

- Municipality
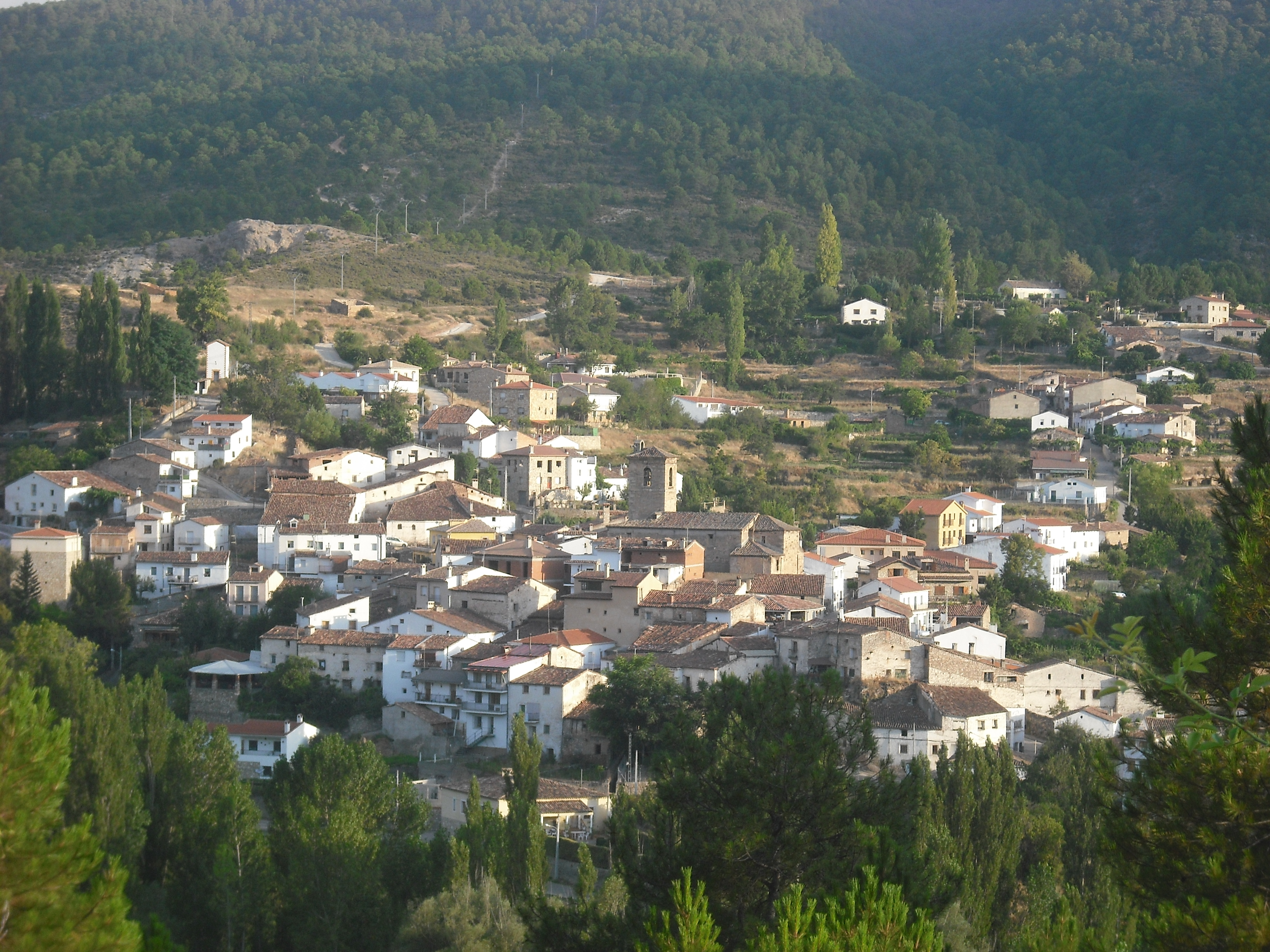
- Paso del Diablo, Fuertescusa

- Flag Coat of arms

- Location within Spain Location within Castilla-La Mancha
- Coordinates: 40°29′N 2°10′W
- Country: Spain
- Autonomous community: Castile-La Mancha
- Province: Cuenca

Government
  - Mayor: María Eva Bodoque Martínez

Area
  - Total: 64.1 km^{2} (24.7 sq mi)
- Elevation: 998 m (3,274 ft)

Population (2025-01-01)
  - Total: 65
  - Density: 1.0/km^{2} (2.6/sq mi)
- Time zone: UTC+1 (CET)
  - Summer (DST): UTC+2 (CEST)

Fuertescusa is a municipality in Cuenca, Castile-La Mancha, Spain. It has a population of 111.
