= Arrancacepas =

Municipality of Spain

- Municipality
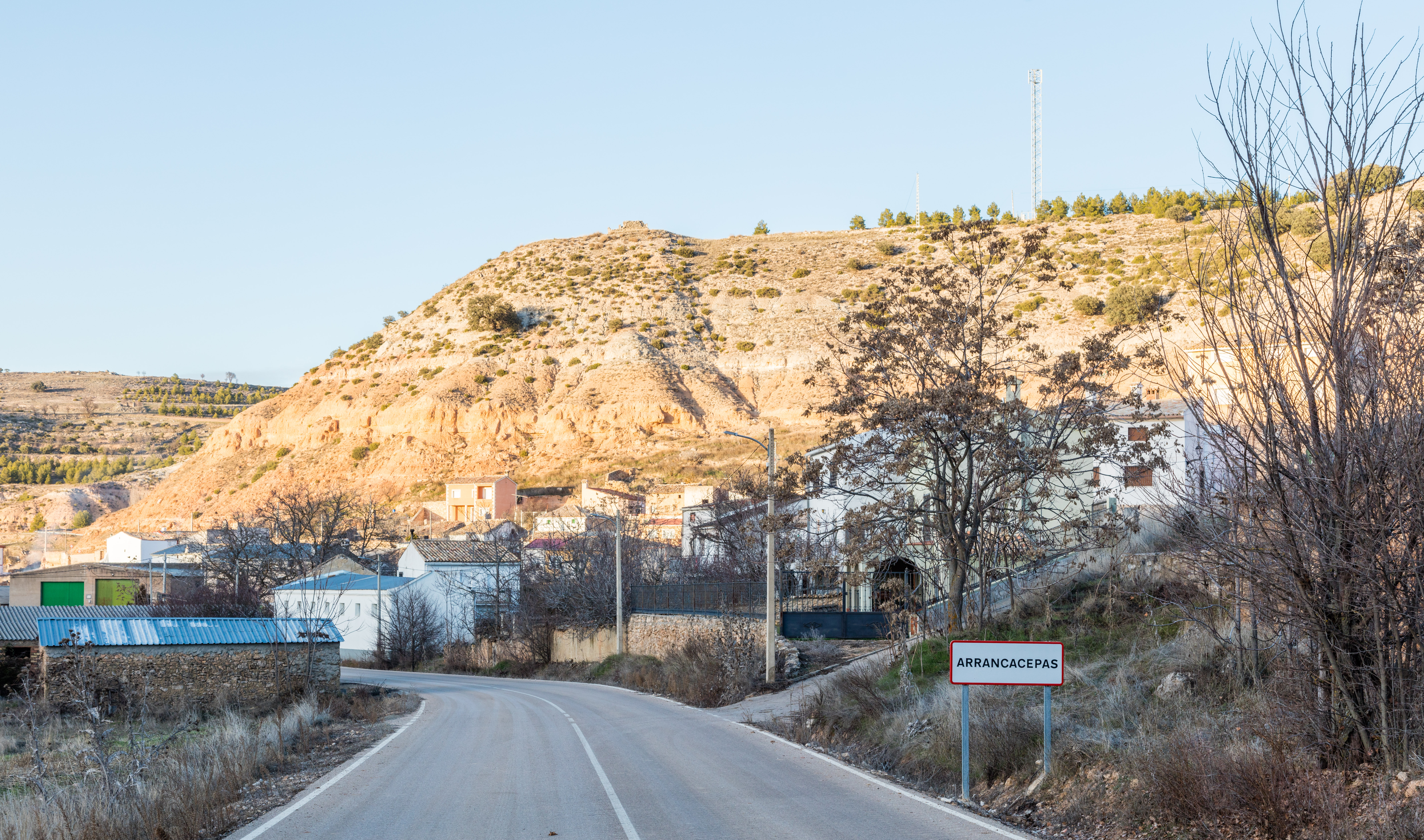

- Location within Spain Location within Castilla-La Mancha
- Coordinates: 40°18′N 2°21′W
- Country: Spain
- Autonomous community: Castile-La Mancha
- Province: Cuenca

Population (2025-01-01)
  - Total: 14
- Time zone: UTC+1 (CET)
  - Summer (DST): UTC+2 (CEST)

Arrancacepas is a municipality in Cuenca, Castile-La Mancha, Spain. It had a population of 25 as of 2020.
