= Lagunaseca =

- Municipality
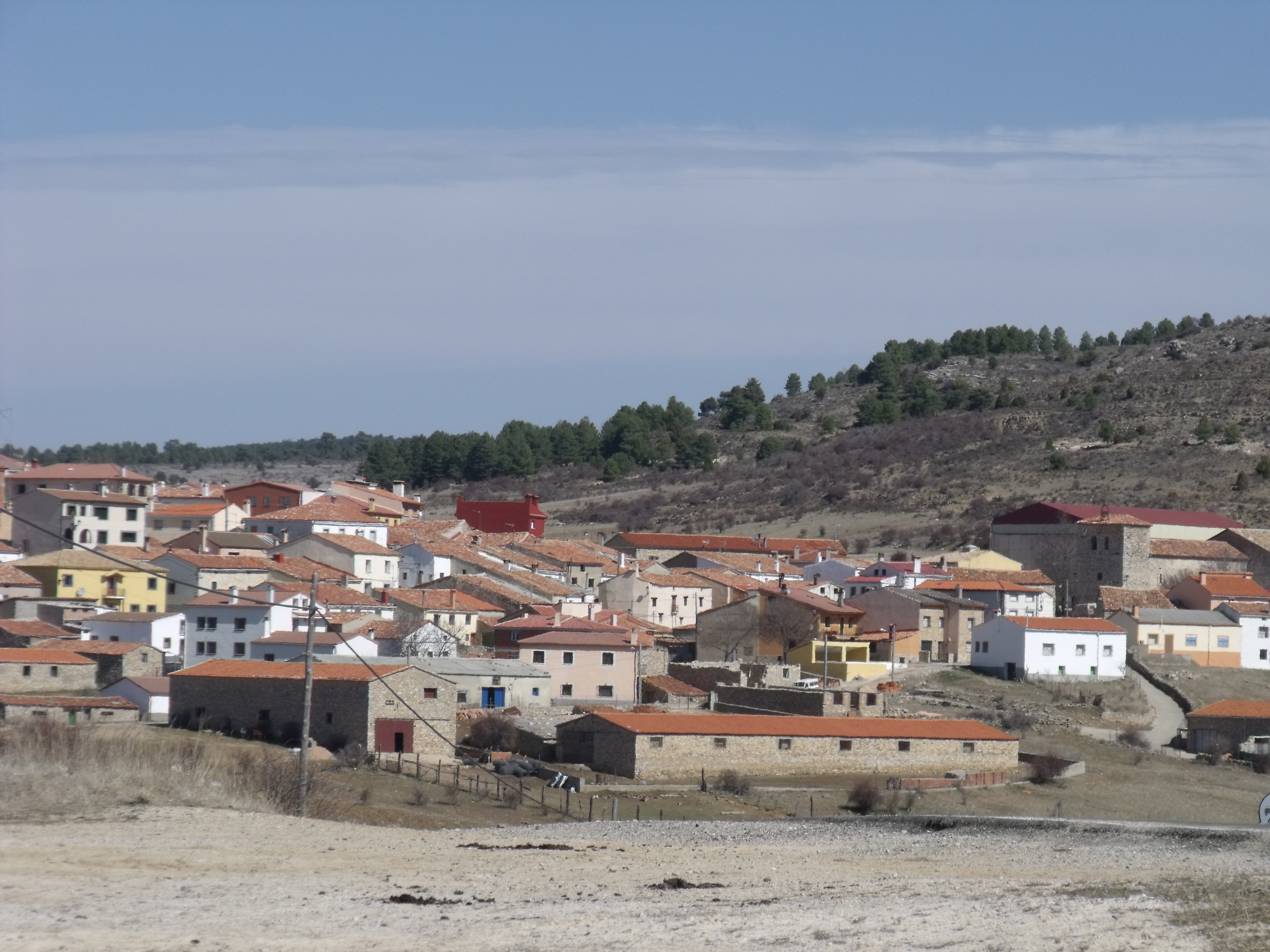
- Vista de Lagunaseca desde el sur.

- Location within Spain Location within Castilla-La Mancha
- Coordinates: 40°32′N 2°01′W
- Country: Spain
- Autonomous community: Castile-La Mancha
- Province: Cuenca

Population (2025-01-01)
  - Total: 50
- Time zone: UTC+1 (CET)
  - Summer (DST): UTC+2 (CEST)

Lagunaseca is a municipality in Cuenca, Castile-La Mancha, Spain. It has a population of 124.
