= Vega del Codorno =

Vega del Codorno, Spain
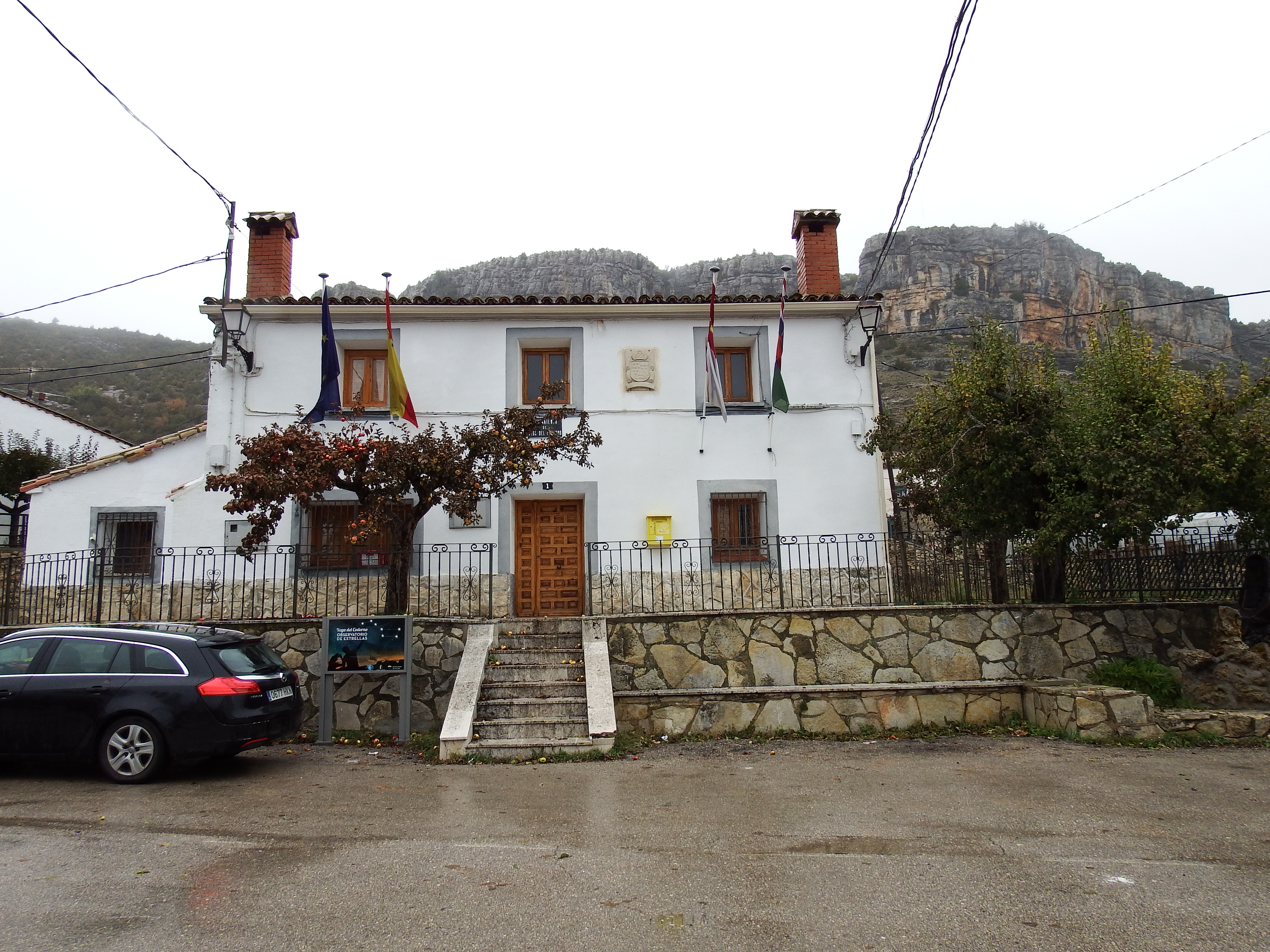

- Flag Coat of arms

- Location within Spain Location within Castilla-La Mancha
- Country: Spain
- Autonomous community: Castile-La Mancha
- Province: Cuenca
- Municipality: Vega del Codorno

Area
  - Total: 23 km^{2} (8.9 sq mi)

Population (2025-01-01)
  - Total: 141
  - Density: 6.1/km^{2} (16/sq mi)
- Time zone: UTC+1 (CET)
  - Summer (DST): UTC+2 (CEST)

Vega del Codorno is a municipality located in the province of Cuenca, Castile-La Mancha, Spain. According to the 2004 census (INE), the municipality has a population of 214 inhabitants.
