= Villas de la Ventosa =

Villas de la Ventosa, Spain
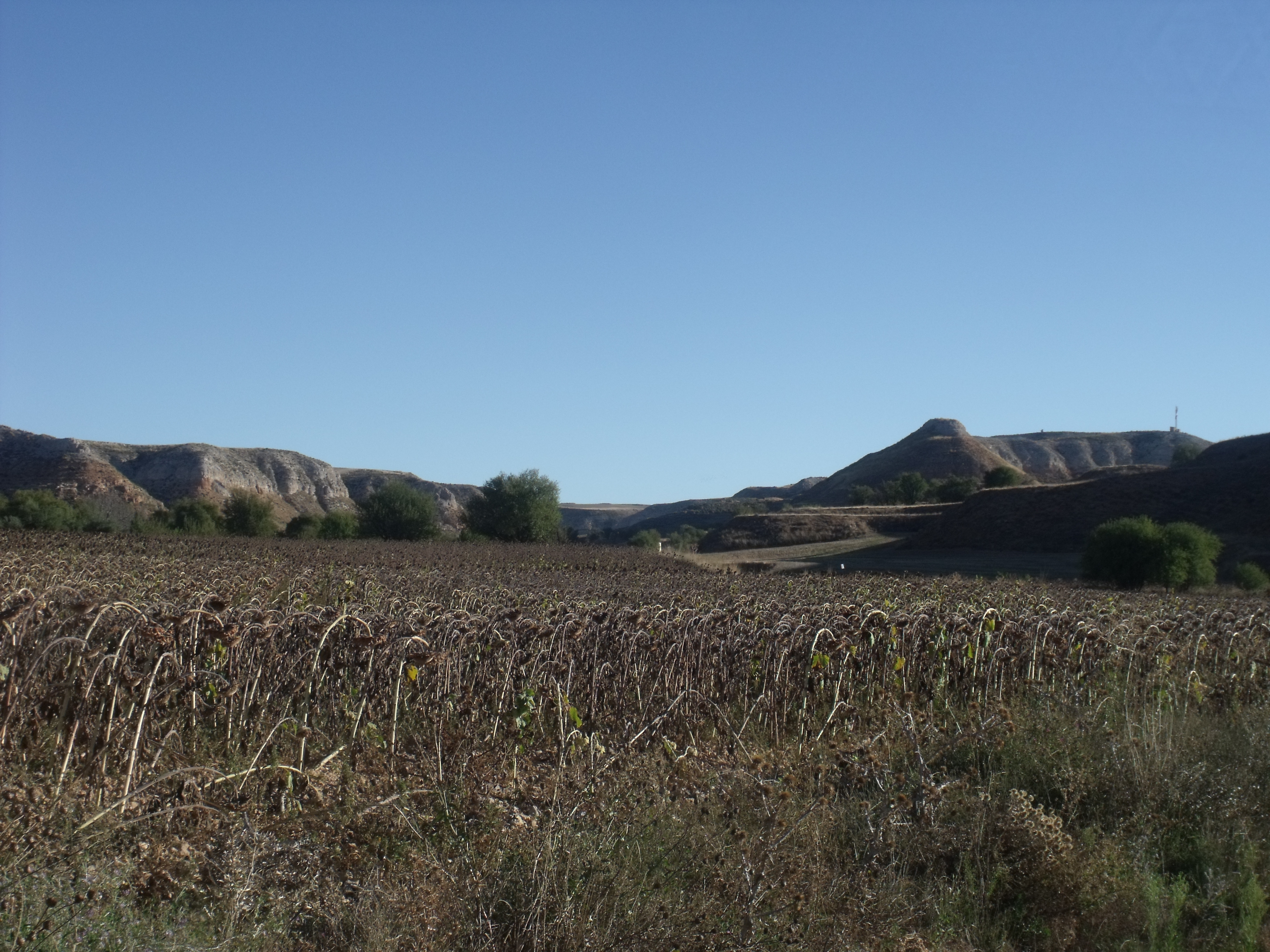
- Fields one kilometre west of Bólliga, one of the small villages that formed the municipality in 1973. Population density is very low.

- Coat of arms
- Interactive map of Villas de la Ventosa, Spain
- Country: Spain
- Autonomous community: Castile-La Mancha
- Province: Cuenca
- Municipality: Villas de la Ventosa

Area
  - Total: 145 km^{2} (56 sq mi)

Population (2025-01-01)
  - Total: 225
  - Density: 1.55/km^{2} (4.02/sq mi)
- Time zone: UTC+1 (CET)
  - Summer (DST): UTC+2 (CEST)

Villas de la Ventosa is a municipality located in the province of Cuenca, Castile-La Mancha, Spain. According to the 2004 census (INE), the municipality has a population of 356 inhabitants.
