= Tejadillos =

Tejadillos, Spain
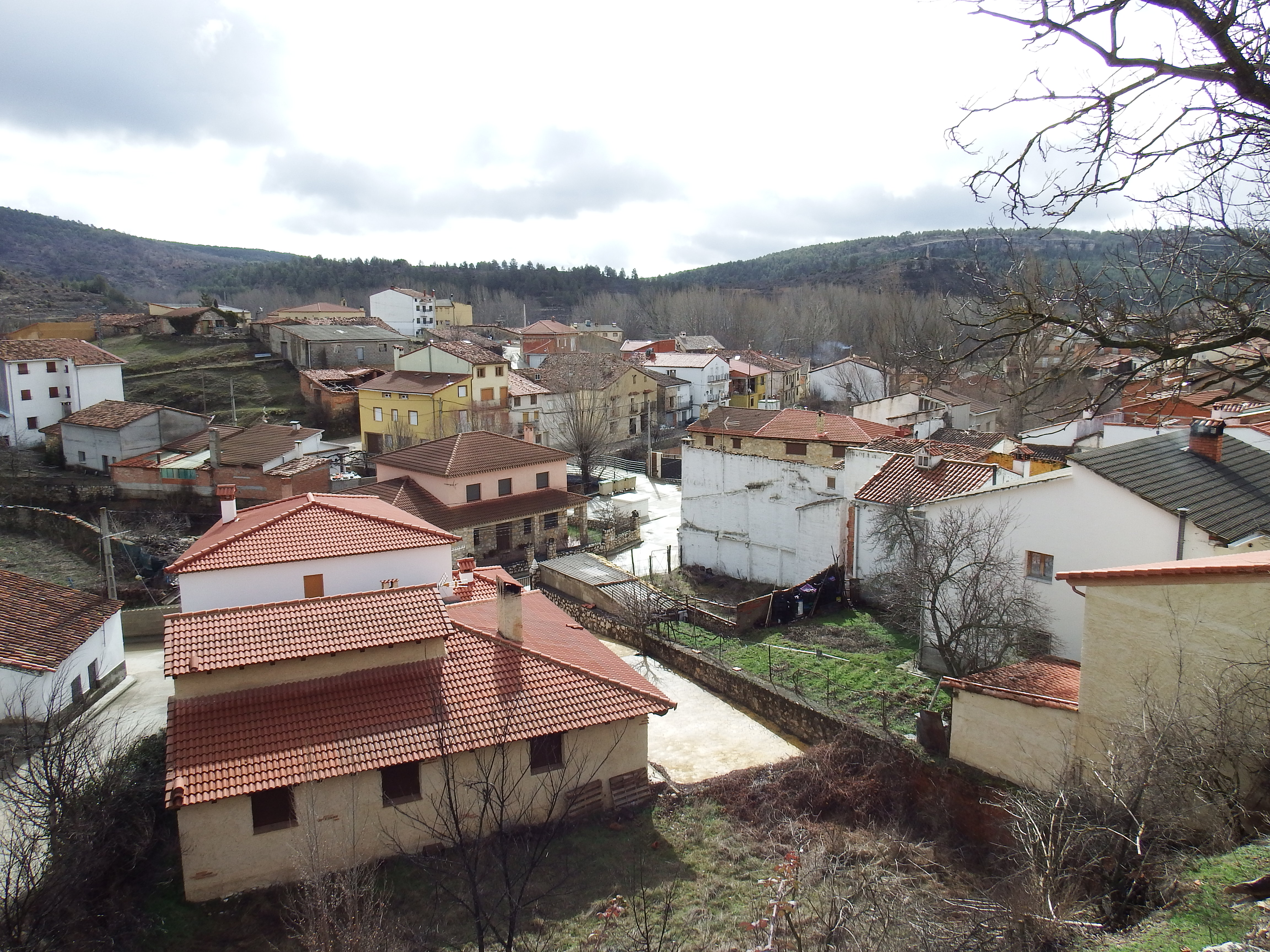
- View of Tejadillos

- Location within Spain Location within Castilla-La Mancha
- Coordinates: 40°08′N 1°38′W
- Country: Spain
- Autonomous community: Castile-La Mancha
- Province: Cuenca
- Municipality: Tejadillos

Area
  - Total: 63 km^{2} (24 sq mi)

Population (2025-01-01)
  - Total: 102
  - Density: 1.6/km^{2} (4.2/sq mi)
- Time zone: UTC+1 (CET)
  - Summer (DST): UTC+2 (CEST)

Tejadillos is a municipality located in the province of Cuenca, Castile-La Mancha, Spain. According to the 2004 census (INE), the municipality has a population of 184 inhabitants.
