= Portalrubio de Guadamejud =

Portalrubio de Guadamejud, Spain
- municipality
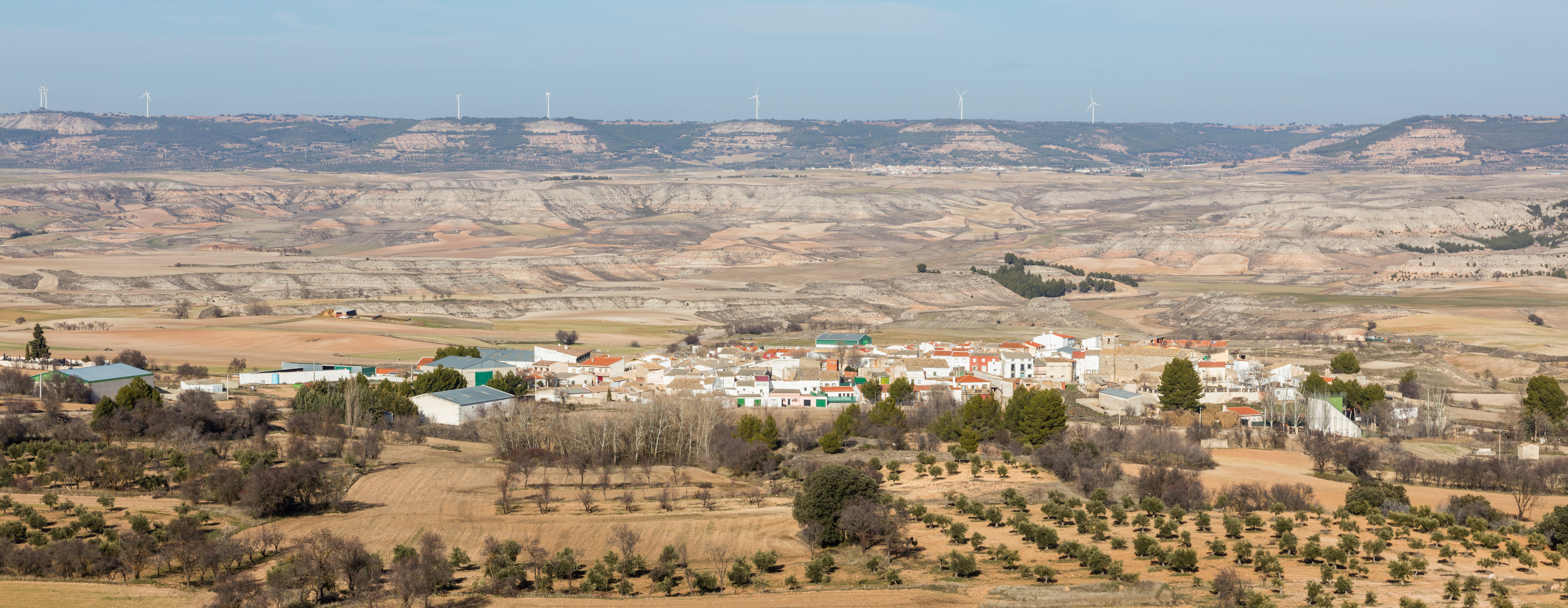

- Coat of arms

- Location within Spain Location within Castilla-La Mancha
- Coordinates: 40.2722°N 2.60472°W
- Country: Spain
- Autonomous community: Castile-La Mancha
- Province: Cuenca

Area
  - Total: 21 km^{2} (8.1 sq mi)

Population (2025-01-01)
  - Total: 35
  - Density: 1.7/km^{2} (4.3/sq mi)
- Time zone: UTC+1 (CET)
  - Summer (DST): UTC+2 (CEST)

Portalrubio de Guadamejud is a municipality located in the province of Cuenca, Castile-La Mancha, Spain. According to the 2004 census (INE), the municipality has a population of 67 inhabitants.
