= Buciegas =

Municipality of Spain

- Municipality
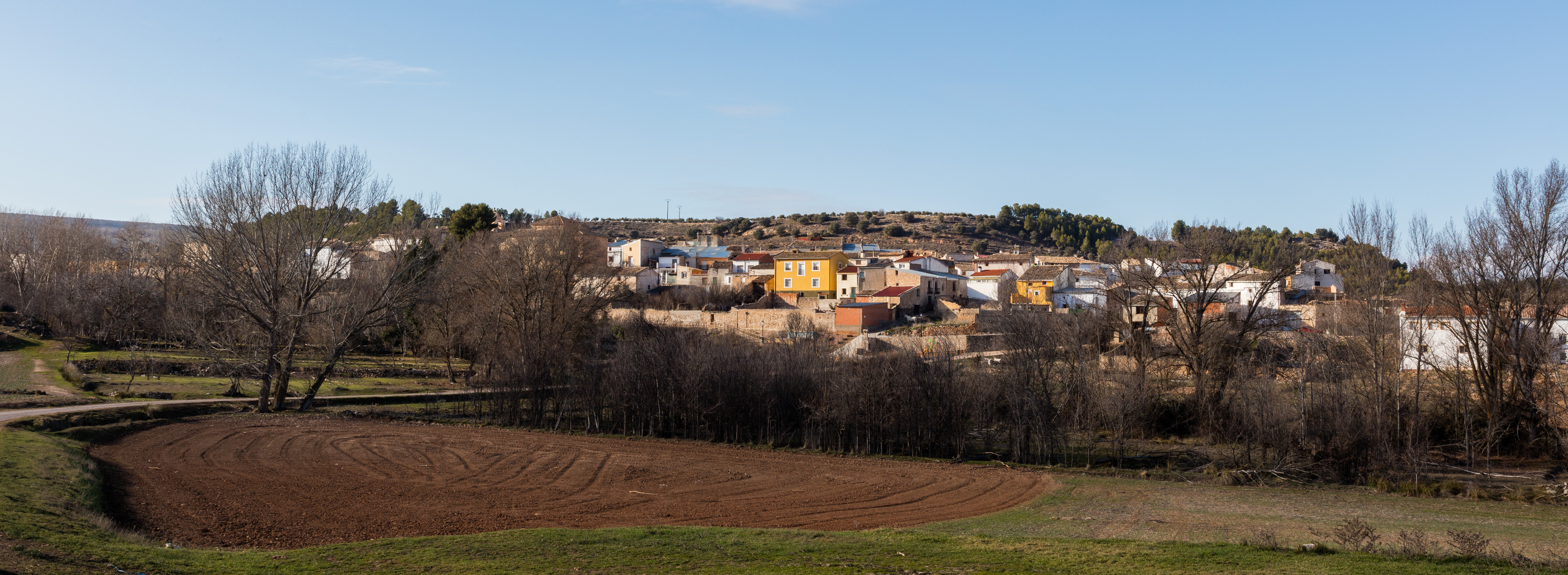

- Flag Coat of arms

- Location within Spain Location within Castilla-La Mancha
- Coordinates: 40.336609°N 2.463033°W
- Country: Spain
- Autonomous community: Castile-La Mancha
- Province: Cuenca

Government
  - Mayor: Juan Duque Mateo

Area
  - Total: 9 km^{2} (3.5 sq mi)
- Elevation: 817 m (2,680 ft)

Population (2025-01-01)
  - Total: 36
  - Density: 4.0/km^{2} (10/sq mi)
- Time zone: UTC+1 (CET)
  - Summer (DST): UTC+2 (CEST)

Buciegas is a municipality in Cuenca, Castile-La Mancha, Spain. It has a population of 46.
