= List of municipalities in Cuenca =

Map of Spain with the province of Cuenca highlighted

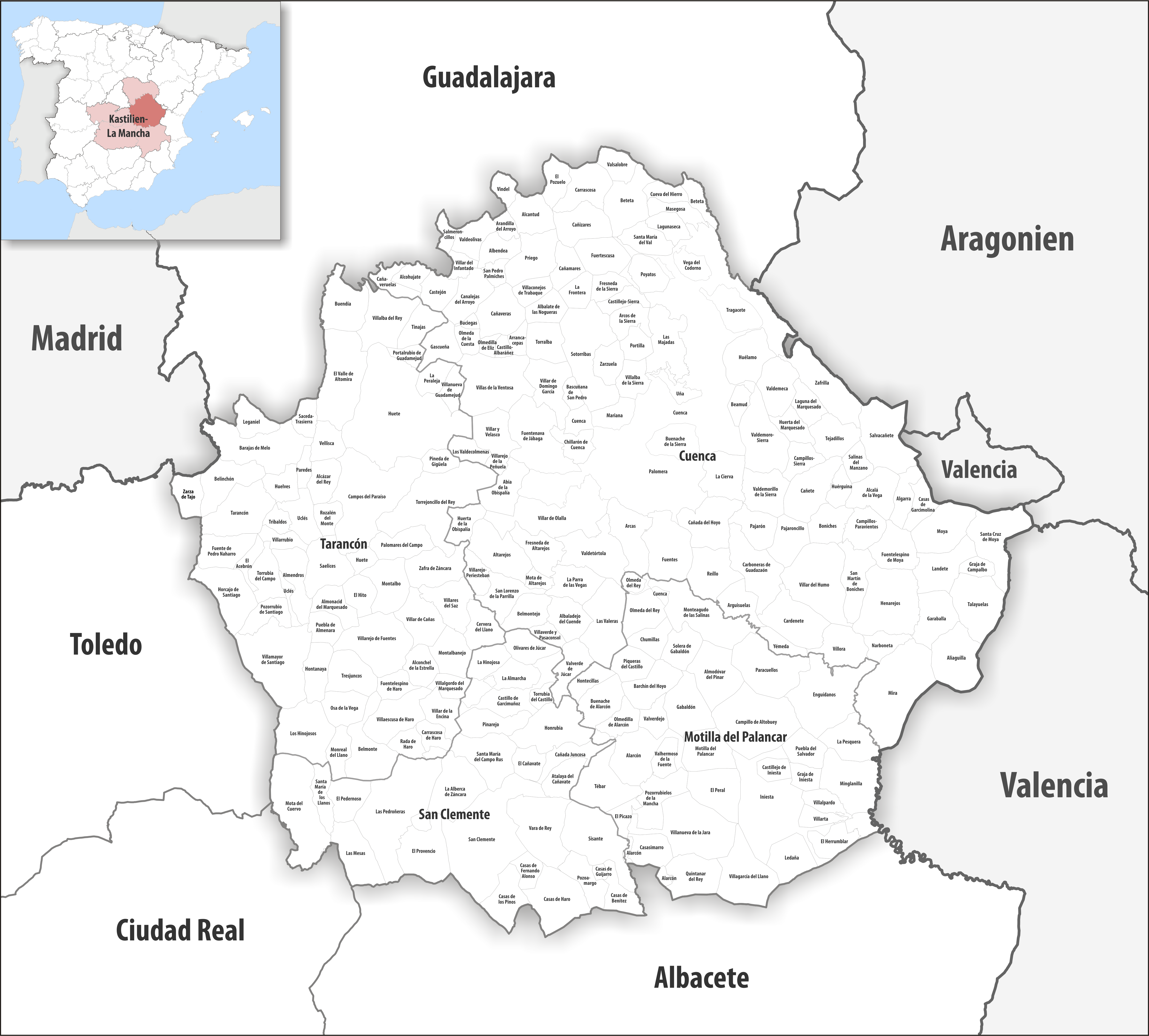
Map of the municipalities in the province of Cuenca

Cuenca is a province in the autonomous community of Castilla–La Mancha, Spain. The province is divided into 238 municipalities. As of the 2023 Spanish census, Cuenca is the 44th most populous of Spain's 50 provinces, with 198,436 inhabitants, and the 5th largest by land area, spanning 17,138.65 km^{2} (6,617.27 sq mi). Municipalities are the most basic local political division in Spain and can only belong to one province. They enjoy a large degree of autonomy in their local administration, being in charge of tasks such as urban planning, water supply, lighting, roads, local police, and firefighting.

The organisation of municipalities in Spain is outlined by the local government law Ley 7/1985, de 2 de abril, Reguladora de las Bases del Régimen Local (transl. Law 7/1985, of 2 April, Regulating the Bases of the Local Administration), which was passed by the Cortes Generales—Spain’s national parliament—on 2 April 1985 and finalised by royal decree on 18 April 1986. Municipalities in Cuenca are also governed by the Statute of Autonomy of Castilla-La Mancha, which includes provisions concerning their relations with Castilla–La Mancha's autonomous government. All citizens of Spain are required to register in the municipality in which they reside. Each municipality is a corporation (Note: Within the context of local government in Spain, a corporation is a legal entity representing a municipality. Each municipality is empowered to govern over a specific piece of land and its population.) with independent legal personhood: its governing body is called the ayuntamiento (municipal council or corporation), a term often also used to refer to the municipal offices (city and town halls). The ayuntamiento is composed of the mayor (Spanish: alcalde), the deputy mayors (tenientes de alcalde) and the councillors (concejales), who form the plenary (pleno), the deliberative body. Municipalities are categorised by population for determining the number of councillors: three when the population is up to 100 inhabitants, five for 101–250, seven for 251–1,000, nine for 1,001–2,000, eleven for 2,001–5,000, thirteen for 5,001–10,000, seventeen for 10,001–20,000, twenty-one for 20,001–50,000, and twenty-five for 50,001–100,000.

The mayor and the deputy mayors are elected by the plenary assembly, which is itself elected by universal suffrage. Elections in municipalities with more than 250 inhabitants are carried out following a proportional representation system with closed lists, whilst those with a population lower than 250 use a block plurality voting system with open lists. The plenary assembly must meet periodically, with meetings occurring more or less frequently depending on the population of the municipality: monthly for those whose population is larger than 20,000, once every two months if it ranges between 5,001 and 20,000, and once every three months if it does not exceed 5,000. Many ayuntamientos also have a local governing board (Spanish: junta de gobierno local), which is appointed by the mayor from amongst the councillors and is required for municipalities of over 5,000 inhabitants. The board, whose role is to assist the mayor between meetings of the plenary assembly, may not include more than one third of the councillors.

The largest municipality by population in the province as of the 2023 Spanish census is Cuenca, its capital, with 53,630 residents, while the smallest is Abia de la Obispalía, with 61 residents. The largest municipality by area is also Cuenca, which spans 910.88 square kilometres (351.69 sq mi), while Casas de Guijarro is the smallest at 8.20 square kilometres (3.17 sq mi).

== Municipalities ==
Largest municipalities in the province of Cuenca by population

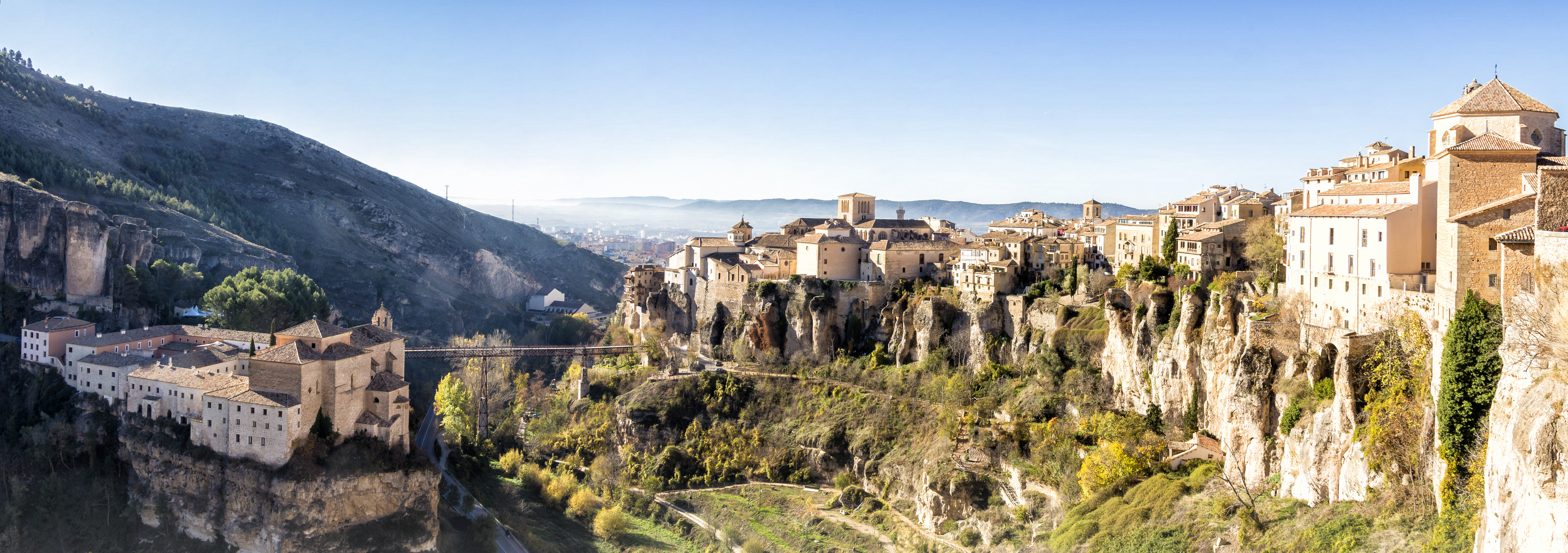
Cuenca is the province's capital and most populous municipality.

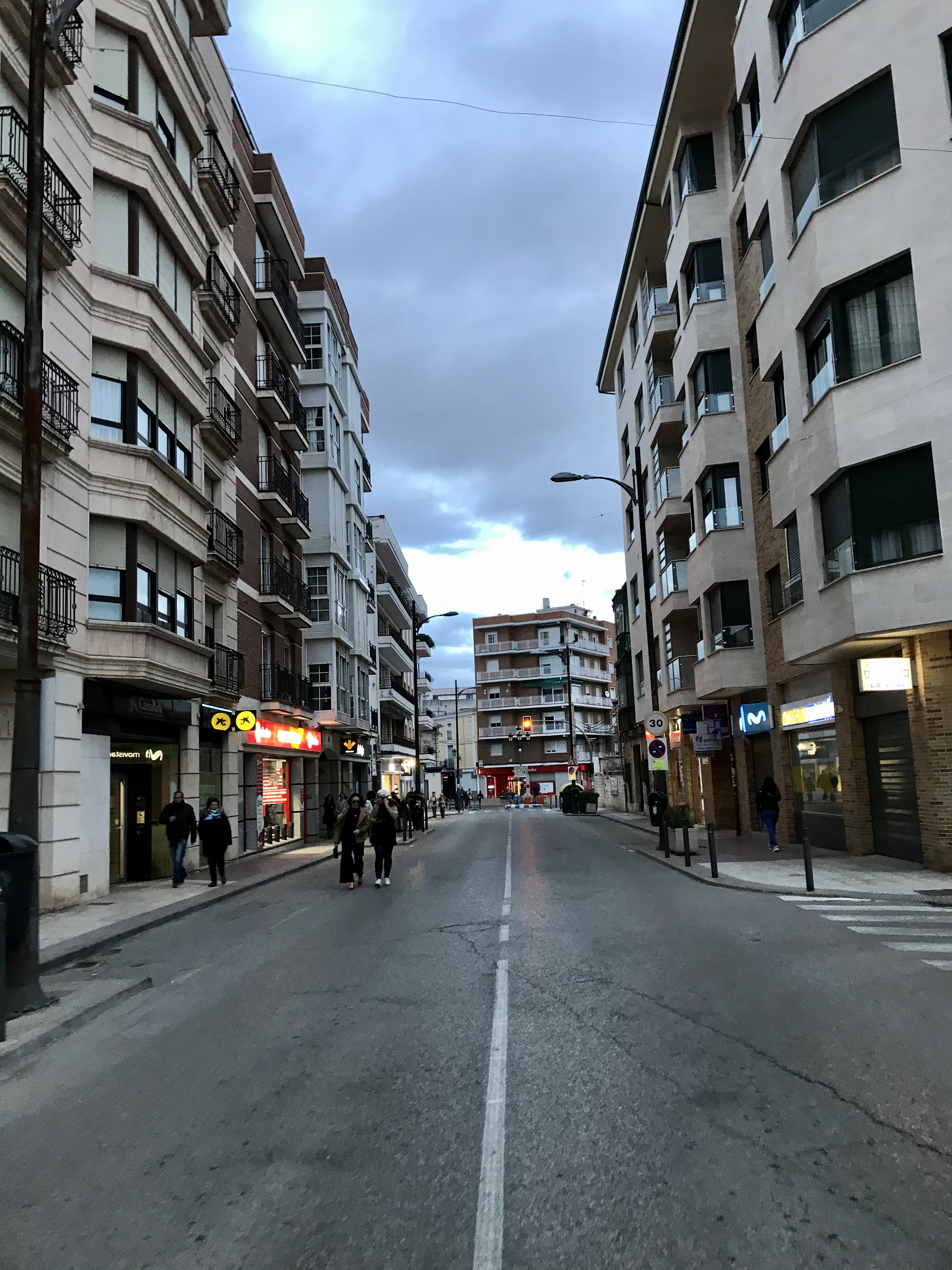
Tarancón, the second largest municipality by population in the province of Cuenca

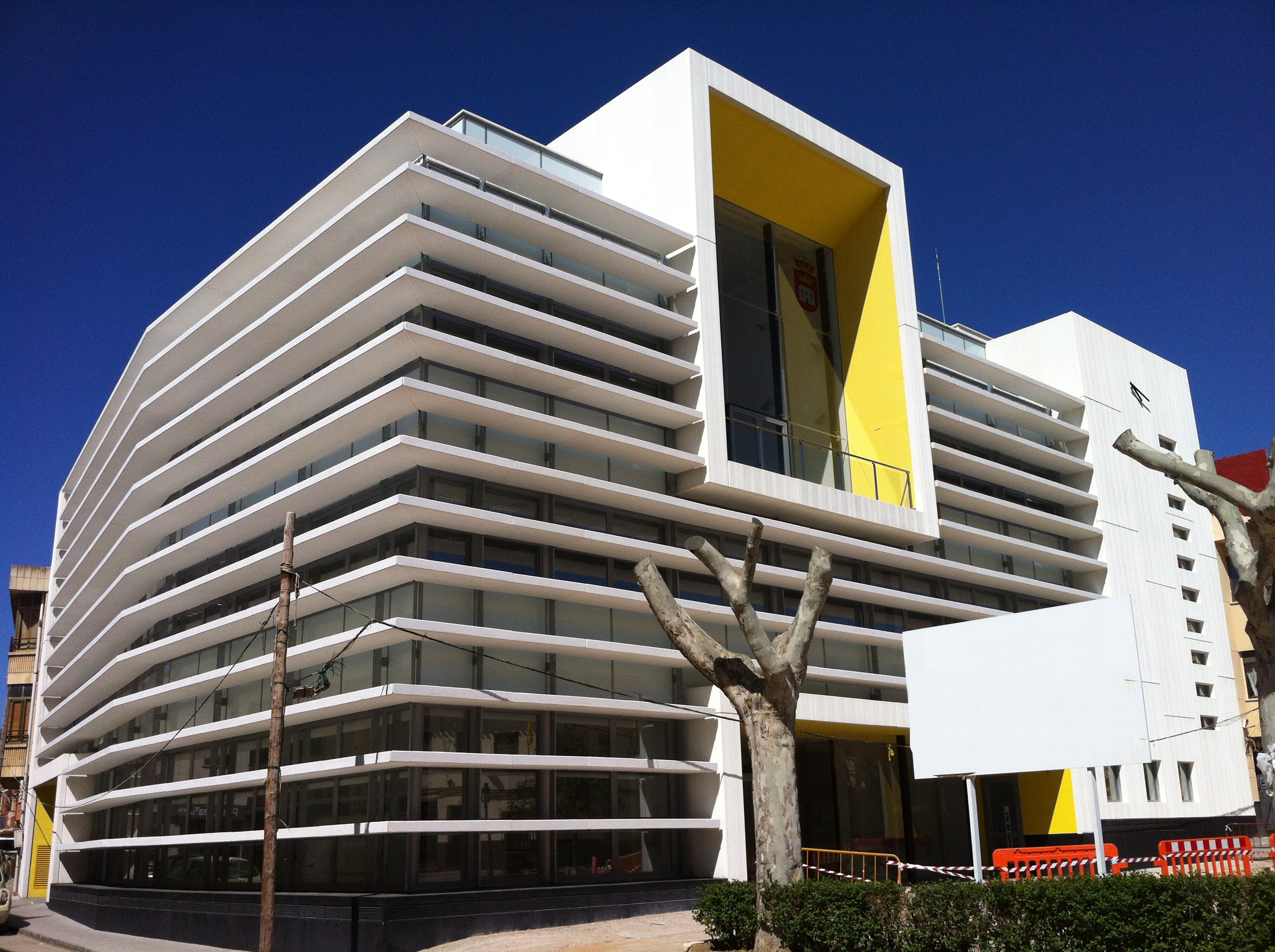
Quintanar del Rey is the province of Cuenca's third most populous municipality.

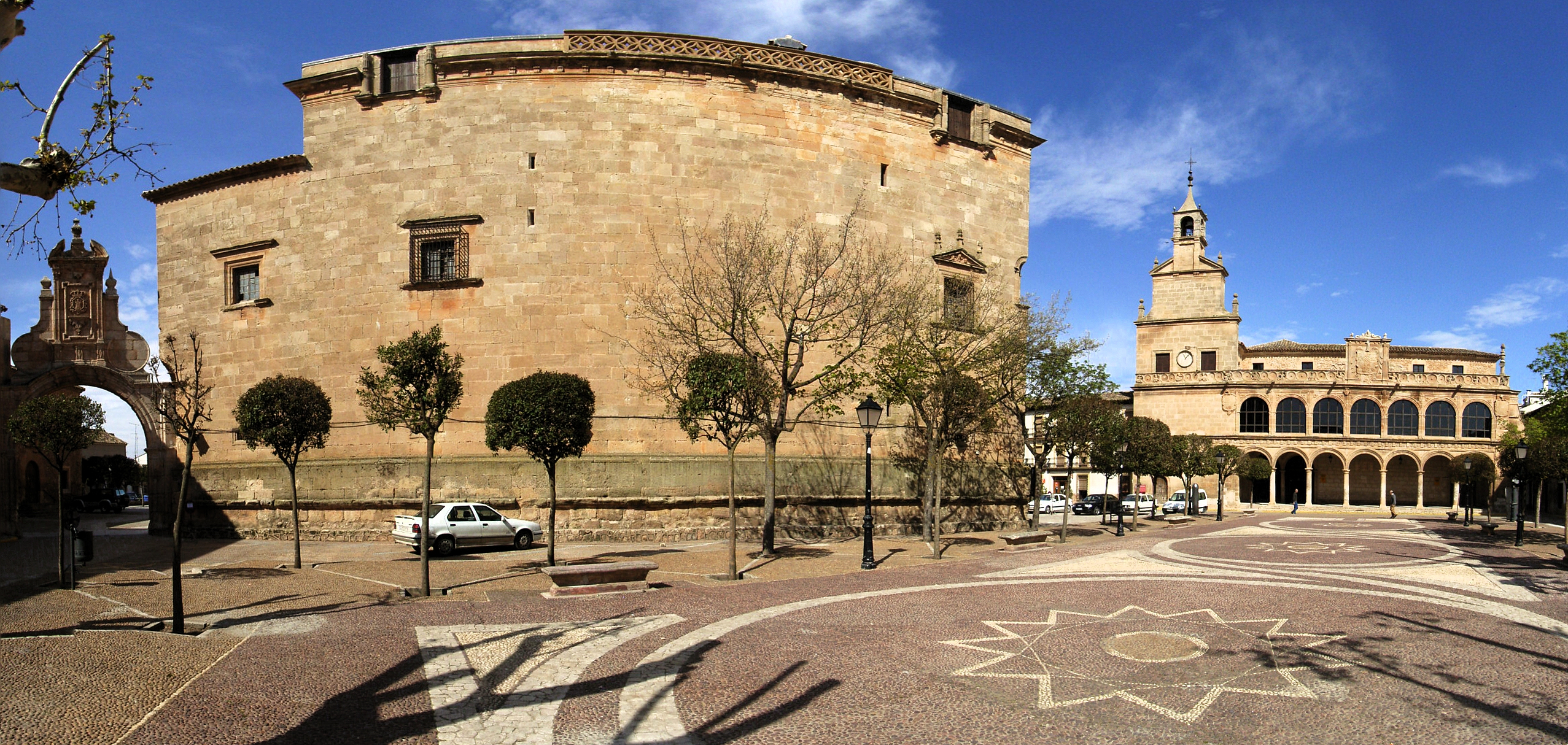
San Clemente, the province of Cuenca's fourth largest municipality by population

† Provincial capital

Municipalities in the province of Cuenca
Name	Population (2023 census)	Population (2011 census)	Population change	Land area (km^{2})	Population density (2023)
Abia de la Obispalía	61	75	−18.7%	63.05	1.0/km^{2}
El Acebrón	226	255	−11.4%	22.12	10.2/km^{2}
Alarcón	172	180	−4.4%	119.96	1.4/km^{2}
Albaladejo del Cuende	228	334	−31.7%	55.19	4.1/km^{2}
Albalate de las Nogueras	268	292	−8.2%	40.11	6.7/km^{2}
Albendea	126	146	−13.7%	38.20	3.3/km^{2}
La Alberca de Záncara	1,569	1,849	−15.1%	100.62	15.6/km^{2}
Alcalá de la Vega	83	120	−30.8%	69.25	1.2/km^{2}
Alcantud	56	84	−33.3%	57.63	1.0/km^{2}
Alcázar del Rey	160	192	−16.7%	46.50	3.4/km^{2}
Alcohujate	19	42	−54.8%	27.29	0.7/km^{2}
Alconchel de la Estrella	82	132	−37.9%	42.94	1.9/km^{2}
Algarra	28	22	+27.3%	41.91	0.7/km^{2}
Aliaguilla	618	760	−18.7%	105.91	5.8/km^{2}
La Almarcha	435	515	−15.5%	64.36	6.8/km^{2}
Almendros	249	284	−12.3%	63.11	3.9/km^{2}
Almodóvar del Pinar	394	460	−14.3%	95.03	4.1/km^{2}
Almonacid del Marquesado	437	467	−6.4%	47.15	9.3/km^{2}
Altarejos	212	239	−11.3%	91.32	2.3/km^{2}
Arandilla del Arroyo	11	18	−38.9%	19.48	0.6/km^{2}
Arcas	2,155	1,448	+48.8%	81.52	26.4/km^{2}
Arcos de la Sierra	77	108	−28.7%	40.50	1.9/km^{2}
Arguisuelas	134	149	−10.1%	49.61	2.7/km^{2}
Arrancacepas	16	30	−46.7%	18.56	0.9/km^{2}
Atalaya del Cañavate	105	138	−23.9%	46.36	2.3/km^{2}
Barajas de Melo	1,020	1,050	−2.9%	136.83	7.5/km^{2}
Barchín del Hoyo	95	91	+4.4%	65.25	1.5/km^{2}
Bascuñana de San Pedro	26	24	+8.3%	19.63	1.3/km^{2}
Beamud	55	57	−3.5%	23.38	2.4/km^{2}
Belinchón	403	381	+5.8%	80.30	5.0/km^{2}
Belmonte	1,795	2,126	−15.6%	92.63	19.4/km^{2}
Belmontejo	135	224	−39.7%	52.23	2.6/km^{2}
Beteta	239	340	−29.7%	115.00	2.1/km^{2}
Boniches	146	141	+3.5%	53.02	2.8/km^{2}
Buciegas	39	48	−18.7%	9.01	4.3/km^{2}
Buenache de Alarcón	457	591	−22.7%	64.16	7.1/km^{2}
Buenache de la Sierra	113	111	+1.8%	57.67	2.0/km^{2}
Buendía	419	468	−10.5%	88.50	4.7/km^{2}
Campillo de Altobuey	1,290	1,619	−20.3%	172.41	7.5/km^{2}
Campillos-Paravientos	107	124	−13.7%	54.34	2.0/km^{2}
Campillos-Sierra	29	57	−49.1%	38.03	0.8/km^{2}
Campos del Paraíso	681	922	−26.1%	216.89	3.1/km^{2}
Canalejas del Arroyo	172	283	−39.2%	60.95	2.8/km^{2}
Cañada del Hoyo	244	289	−15.6%	89.75	2.7/km^{2}
Cañada Juncosa	220	296	−25.7%	42.72	5.1/km^{2}
Cañamares	453	528	−14.2%	40.52	11.2/km^{2}
El Cañavate	139	162	−14.2%	36.10	3.9/km^{2}
Cañaveras	241	376	−35.9%	73.63	3.3/km^{2}
Cañaveruelas	117	173	−32.4%	33.57	3.5/km^{2}
Cañete	810	932	−13.1%	86.96	9.3/km^{2}
Cañizares	443	526	−15.8%	76.24	5.8/km^{2}
Carboneras de Guadazaón	775	809	−4.2%	100.65	7.7/km^{2}
Cardenete	479	574	−16.6%	97.51	4.9/km^{2}
Carrascosa	65	114	−43.0%	71.47	0.9/km^{2}
Carrascosa de Haro	96	130	−26.2%	29.05	3.3/km^{2}
Casas de Benítez	811	1,011	−19.8%	46.76	17.3/km^{2}
Casas de Fernando Alonso	1,151	1,419	−18.9%	30.28	38.0/km^{2}
Casas de Garcimolina	34	31	+9.7%	38.69	0.9/km^{2}
Casas de Guijarro	112	128	−12.5%	8.20	13.7/km^{2}
Casas de Haro	846	886	−4.5%	110.84	7.6/km^{2}
Casas de los Pinos	421	571	−26.3%	68.22	6.2/km^{2}
Casasimarro	3,169	3,291	−3.7%	49.62	63.9/km^{2}
Castejón	140	171	−18.1%	43.62	3.2/km^{2}
Castillejo de Iniesta	123	185	−33.5%	27.70	4.4/km^{2}
Castillejo-Sierra	35	33	+6.1%	30.37	1.2/km^{2}
Castillo-Albaráñez	23	25	−8.0%	12.43	1.9/km^{2}
Castillo de Garcimuñoz	134	175	−23.4%	82.21	1.6/km^{2}
Cervera del Llano	210	269	−21.9%	55.49	3.8/km^{2}
Chillarón de Cuenca	808	606	+33.3%	39.17	20.6/km^{2}
Chumillas	66	70	−5.7%	39.58	1.7/km^{2}
La Cierva	38	54	−29.6%	71.70	0.5/km^{2}
Cuenca†	53,630	56,472	−5.0%	910.88	58.9/km^{2}
Cueva del Hierro	29	39	−25.6%	28.20	1.0/km^{2}
Enguídanos	315	379	−16.9%	165.35	1.9/km^{2}
Fresneda de Altarejos	40	60	−33.3%	59.90	0.7/km^{2}
Fresneda de la Sierra	40	57	−29.8%	31.90	1.3/km^{2}
La Frontera	153	192	−20.3%	34.57	4.4/km^{2}
Fuente de Pedro Naharro	1,238	1,328	−6.8%	63.58	19.5/km^{2}
Fuentelespino de Haro	237	266	−10.9%	33.44	7.1/km^{2}
Fuentelespino de Moya	107	139	−23.0%	65.72	1.6/km^{2}
Fuentenava de Jábaga	593	595	−0.3%	133.16	4.5/km^{2}
Fuentes	464	494	−6.1%	107.66	4.3/km^{2}
Fuertescusa	69	82	−15.9%	64.04	1.1/km^{2}
Gabaldón	158	204	−22.5%	84.10	1.9/km^{2}
Garaballa	66	98	−32.7%	69.77	0.9/km^{2}
Gascueña	142	201	−29.4%	51.81	2.7/km^{2}
Graja de Campalbo	89	109	−18.3%	22.30	4.0/km^{2}
Graja de Iniesta	362	395	−8.4%	28.22	12.8/km^{2}
Henarejos	134	191	−29.8%	145.90	0.9/km^{2}
El Herrumblar	746	768	−2.9%	46.10	16.2/km^{2}
La Hinojosa	191	246	−22.4%	42.11	4.5/km^{2}
Los Hinojosos	733	958	−23.5%	114.02	6.4/km^{2}
El Hito	146	178	−18.0%	41.22	3.5/km^{2}
Honrubia	1,568	1,738	−9.8%	110.34	14.2/km^{2}
Hontanaya	266	353	−24.6%	53.63	5.0/km^{2}
Hontecillas	56	72	−22.2%	34.70	1.6/km^{2}
Horcajo de Santiago	3,722	4,013	−7.3%	96.03	38.8/km^{2}
Huélamo	81	150	−46.0%	79.24	1.0/km^{2}
Huelves	90	78	+15.4%	39.34	2.3/km^{2}
Huérguina	48	53	−9.4%	28.01	1.7/km^{2}
Huerta de la Obispalía	143	118	+21.2%	41.88	3.4/km^{2}
Huerta del Marquesado	177	231	−23.4%	35.69	5.0/km^{2}
Huete	1,756	1,978	−11.2%	377.57	4.7/km^{2}
Iniesta	4,417	4,555	−3.0%	232.28	19.0/km^{2}
Laguna del Marquesado	58	62	−6.5%	37.91	1.5/km^{2}
Lagunaseca	51	97	−47.4%	34.34	1.5/km^{2}
Landete	1,245	1,355	−8.1%	79.34	15.7/km^{2}
Ledaña	1,645	1,842	−10.7%	65.47	25.1/km^{2}
Leganiel	223	214	+4.2%	45.10	4.9/km^{2}
Las Majadas	224	311	−28.0%	88.33	2.5/km^{2}
Mariana	322	287	+12.2%	39.97	8.1/km^{2}
Masegosa	63	105	−40.0%	30.82	2.0/km^{2}
Las Mesas	2,294	2,505	−8.4%	86.45	26.5/km^{2}
Minglanilla	2,311	2,556	−9.6%	109.57	21.1/km^{2}
Mira	922	1,012	−8.9%	212.86	4.3/km^{2}
Monreal del Llano	46	78	−41.0%	39.02	1.2/km^{2}
Montalbanejo	89	129	−31.0%	59.33	1.5/km^{2}
Montalbo	712	764	−6.8%	73.96	9.6/km^{2}
Monteagudo de las Salinas	138	158	−12.7%	131.86	1.0/km^{2}
Mota de Altarejos	29	39	−25.6%	16.95	1.7/km^{2}
Mota del Cuervo	6,084	6,274	−3.0%	176.17	34.5/km^{2}
Motilla del Palancar	6,168	6,226	−0.9%	73.89	83.5/km^{2}
Moya	170	194	−12.4%	91.73	1.9/km^{2}
Narboneta	53	59	−10.2%	34.95	1.5/km^{2}
Olivares de Júcar	317	393	−19.3%	50.00	6.3/km^{2}
Olmeda de la Cuesta	22	37	−40.5%	23.23	0.9/km^{2}
Olmeda del Rey	130	149	−12.8%	74.61	1.7/km^{2}
Olmedilla de Alarcón	134	154	−13.0%	38.31	3.5/km^{2}
Olmedilla de Eliz	22	21	+4.8%	13.31	1.7/km^{2}
Osa de la Vega	443	594	−25.4%	53.34	8.3/km^{2}
Pajarón	78	95	−17.9%	52.61	1.5/km^{2}
Pajaroncillo	59	81	−27.2%	56.91	1.0/km^{2}
Palomares del Campo	558	738	−24.4%	60.98	9.2/km^{2}
Palomera	189	194	−2.6%	50.27	3.8/km^{2}
Paracuellos	99	134	−26.1%	123.48	0.8/km^{2}
Paredes	75	79	−5.1%	19.35	3.9/km^{2}
La Parra de las Vegas	34	46	−26.1%	61.51	0.6/km^{2}
El Pedernoso	1,126	1,272	−11.5%	56.37	20.0/km^{2}
Las Pedroñeras	6,647	7,061	−5.9%	225.06	29.5/km^{2}
El Peral	665	793	−16.1%	85.84	7.7/km^{2}
La Peraleja	88	134	−34.3%	34.93	2.5/km^{2}
La Pesquera	226	250	−9.6%	72.36	3.1/km^{2}
El Picazo	693	737	−6.0%	24.90	27.8/km^{2}
Pinarejo	193	292	−33.9%	61.82	3.1/km^{2}
Pineda de Gigüela	60	75	−20.0%	29.08	2.1/km^{2}
Piqueras del Castillo	48	70	−31.4%	45.86	1.0/km^{2}
Portalrubio de Guadamejud	36	55	−34.5%	20.97	1.7/km^{2}
Portilla	56	78	−28.2%	32.91	1.7/km^{2}
Poyatos	80	86	−7.0%	45.05	1.8/km^{2}
Pozoamargo	269	367	−26.7%	53.33	5.0/km^{2}
Pozorrubielos de la Mancha	183	281	−34.9%	73.58	2.5/km^{2}
Pozorrubio de Santiago	323	372	−13.2%	44.70	7.2/km^{2}
El Pozuelo	44	74	−40.5%	41.26	1.1/km^{2}
Priego	898	1,101	−18.4%	80.34	11.2/km^{2}
El Provencio	2,393	2,662	−10.1%	101.60	23.6/km^{2}
Puebla de Almenara	331	455	−27.3%	37.67	8.8/km^{2}
Puebla del Salvador	202	239	−15.5%	48.09	4.2/km^{2}
Quintanar del Rey	7,655	7,742	−1.1%	79.92	95.8/km^{2}
Rada de Haro	50	72	−30.6%	32.25	1.6/km^{2}
Reíllo	110	125	−12.0%	81.70	1.3/km^{2}
Rozalén del Monte	59	81	−27.2%	30.63	1.9/km^{2}
Saceda-Trasierra	42	65	−35.4%	30.92	1.4/km^{2}
Saelices	471	630	−25.2%	80.62	5.8/km^{2}
Salinas del Manzano	76	95	−20.0%	33.65	2.3/km^{2}
Salmeroncillos	103	137	−24.8%	20.68	5.0/km^{2}
Salvacañete	298	319	−6.6%	120.28	2.5/km^{2}
San Clemente	6,794	7,419	−8.4%	277.51	24.5/km^{2}
San Lorenzo de la Parrilla	1,108	1,259	−12.0%	59.89	18.5/km^{2}
San Martín de Boniches	45	48	−6.2%	69.77	0.6/km^{2}
San Pedro Palmiches	58	79	−26.6%	19.85	2.9/km^{2}
Santa Cruz de Moya	225	294	−23.5%	110.74	2.0/km^{2}
Santa María del Campo Rus	537	686	−21.7%	93.63	5.7/km^{2}
Santa María de los Llanos	685	760	−9.9%	43.01	15.9/km^{2}
Santa María del Val	65	72	−9.7%	47.06	1.4/km^{2}
Sisante	1,639	1,880	−12.8%	134.36	12.2/km^{2}
Solera de Gabaldón	34	24	+41.7%	50.49	0.7/km^{2}
Sotorribas	698	842	−17.1%	149.21	4.7/km^{2}
Talayuelas	874	1,041	−16.0%	106.59	8.2/km^{2}
Tarancón	16,331	15,604	+4.7%	106.58	153.2/km^{2}
Tébar	310	381	−18.6%	99.02	3.1/km^{2}
Tejadillos	107	141	−24.1%	63.28	1.7/km^{2}
Tinajas	191	275	−30.5%	46.89	4.1/km^{2}
Torralba	111	164	−32.3%	55.49	2.0/km^{2}
Torrejoncillo del Rey	344	501	−31.3%	201.46	1.7/km^{2}
Torrubia del Campo	311	310	+0.3%	53.36	5.8/km^{2}
Torrubia del Castillo	44	41	+7.3%	17.47	2.5/km^{2}
Tragacete	268	326	−17.8%	61.75	4.3/km^{2}
Tresjuncos	272	373	−27.1%	70.29	3.9/km^{2}
Tribaldos	97	121	−19.8%	21.28	4.6/km^{2}
Uclés	248	238	+4.2%	64.61	3.8/km^{2}
Uña	88	106	−17.0%	23.55	3.7/km^{2}
Los Valdecolmenas	71	106	−33.0%	31.31	2.3/km^{2}
Valdemeca	83	99	−16.2%	69.82	1.2/km^{2}
Valdemorillo de la Sierra	56	88	−36.4%	70.27	0.8/km^{2}
Valdemoro-Sierra	110	134	−17.9%	107.64	1.0/km^{2}
Valdeolivas	218	223	−2.2%	46.05	4.7/km^{2}
Valdetórtola	126	171	−26.3%	103.21	1.2/km^{2}
Las Valeras	1,589	1,667	−4.7%	113.05	14.1/km^{2}
Valhermoso de la Fuente	76	42	+81.0%	32.12	2.4/km^{2}
El Valle de Altomira	210	287	−26.8%	147.41	1.4/km^{2}
Valsalobre	21	46	−54.3%	38.08	0.6/km^{2}
Valverde de Júcar	1,080	1,224	−11.8%	56.21	19.2/km^{2}
Valverdejo	94	109	−13.8%	32.47	2.9/km^{2}
Vara de Rey	474	620	−23.5%	127.88	3.7/km^{2}
Vega del Codorno	146	175	−16.6%	32.27	4.5/km^{2}
Vellisca	118	142	−16.9%	42.98	2.7/km^{2}
Villaconejos de Trabaque	333	442	−24.7%	31.86	10.5/km^{2}
Villaescusa de Haro	491	551	−10.9%	93.20	5.3/km^{2}
Villagarcía del Llano	765	838	−8.7%	116.84	6.5/km^{2}
Villalba de la Sierra	543	553	−1.8%	41.24	13.2/km^{2}
Villalba del Rey	489	586	−16.6%	95.07	5.1/km^{2}
Villalgordo del Marquesado	66	101	−34.7%	30.30	2.2/km^{2}
Villalpardo	1,008	1,147	−12.1%	31.49	32.0/km^{2}
Villamayor de Santiago	2,418	2,896	−16.5%	181.17	13.3/km^{2}
Villanueva de Guadamejud	62	104	−40.4%	30.61	2.0/km^{2}
Villanueva de la Jara	2,356	2,490	−5.4%	156.06	15.1/km^{2}
Villar de Cañas	389	424	−8.3%	70.36	5.5/km^{2}
Villar de Domingo García	226	231	−2.2%	76.89	2.9/km^{2}
Villar de la Encina	153	172	−11.0%	49.19	3.1/km^{2}
Villar del Humo	192	283	−32.2%	150.05	1.3/km^{2}
Villar del Infantado	30	40	−25.0%	21.76	1.4/km^{2}
Villar de Olalla	1,422	1,250	+13.8%	157.83	9.0/km^{2}
Villar y Velasco	79	99	−20.2%	61.77	1.3/km^{2}
Villarejo de Fuentes	414	632	−34.5%	128.36	3.2/km^{2}
Villarejo de la Peñuela	23	25	−8.0%	13.02	1.8/km^{2}
Villarejo-Periesteban	387	421	−8.1%	33.43	11.6/km^{2}
Villares del Saz	474	618	−23.3%	70.16	6.8/km^{2}
Villarrubio	208	233	−10.7%	28.20	7.4/km^{2}
Villarta	853	920	−7.3%	25.62	33.3/km^{2}
Villas de la Ventosa	222	299	−25.8%	145.11	1.5/km^{2}
Villaverde y Pasaconsol	338	372	−9.1%	21.20	15.9/km^{2}
Víllora	135	163	−17.2%	68.90	2.0/km^{2}
Vindel	18	15	+20.0%	25.25	0.7/km^{2}
Yémeda	22	44	−50.0%	28.84	0.8/km^{2}
Zafra de Záncara	92	146	−37.0%	78.72	1.2/km^{2}
Zafrilla	53	92	−42.4%	106.11	0.5/km^{2}
Zarza de Tajo	279	318	−12.3%	45.82	6.1/km^{2}
Zarzuela	157	224	−29.9%	40.33	3.9/km^{2}
Province of Cuenca	198,436	215,165	−7.8%	17,138.65	11.6/km^{2}
Castilla–La Mancha	2,084,086	2,106,331	−1.1%	79,410.62	26.2/km^{2}
Spain	48,085,361	46,815,916	+2.7%	504,755.17	95.3/km^{2}

== See also ==
- Geography of Spain
- List of municipalities of Spain
