= Valsalobre =

Valsalobre, Spain
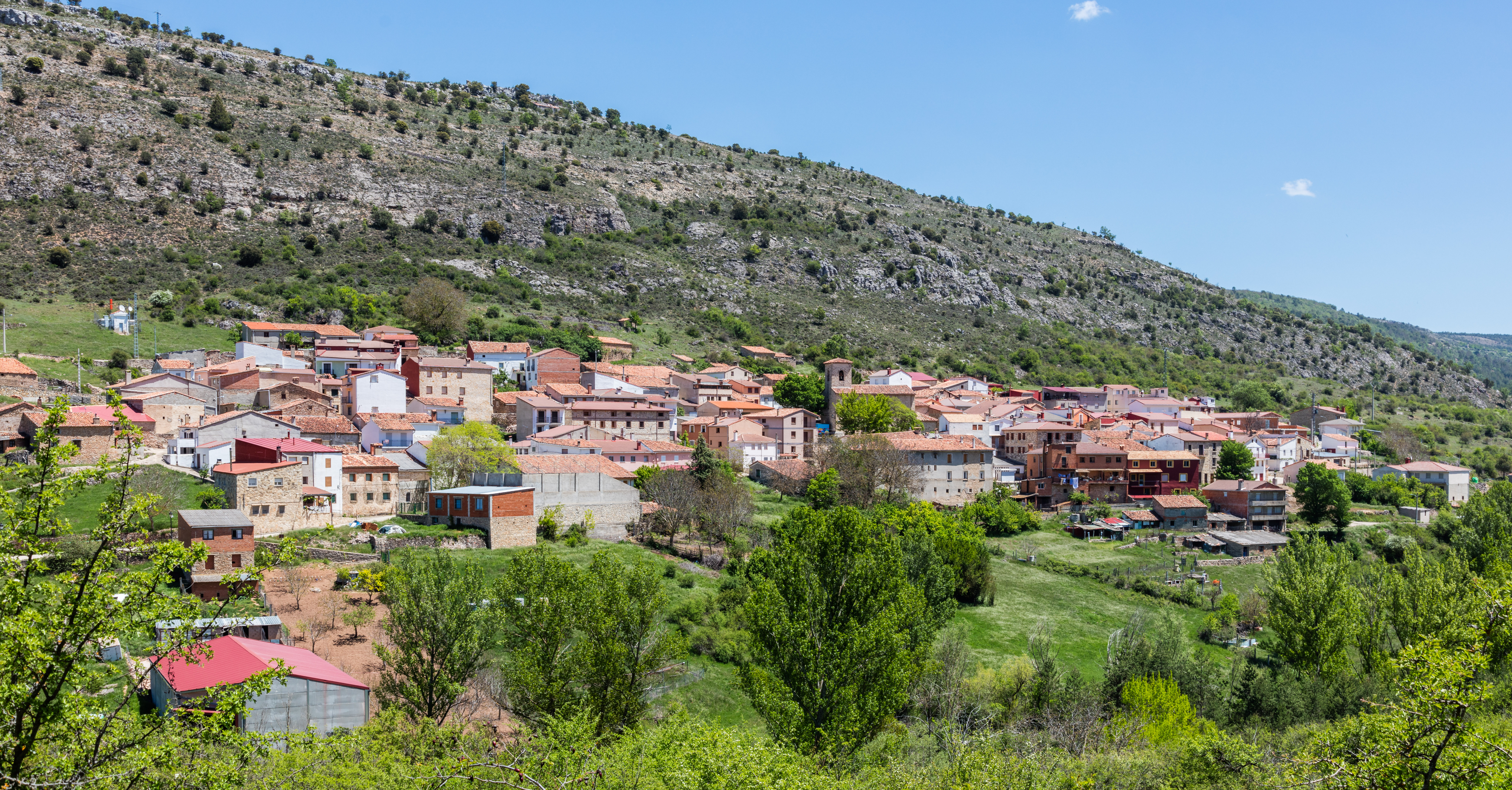

- Location within Spain Location within Castilla-La Mancha
- Coordinates: 40.6172°N 2.0931°W
- Country: Spain
- Autonomous community: Castile-La Mancha
- Province: Cuenca
- Municipality: Valsalobre

Area
  - Total: 37 km^{2} (14 sq mi)

Population (2025-01-01)
  - Total: 17
  - Density: 0.46/km^{2} (1.2/sq mi)
- Time zone: UTC+1 (CET)
  - Summer (DST): UTC+2 (CEST)

Valsalobre is a municipality located in the province of Cuenca, Castile-La Mancha, Spain. According to the 2004 census (INE), the municipality has a population of 67 inhabitants.
