= Valdemorillo de la Sierra =

Valdemorillo de la Sierra, Spain
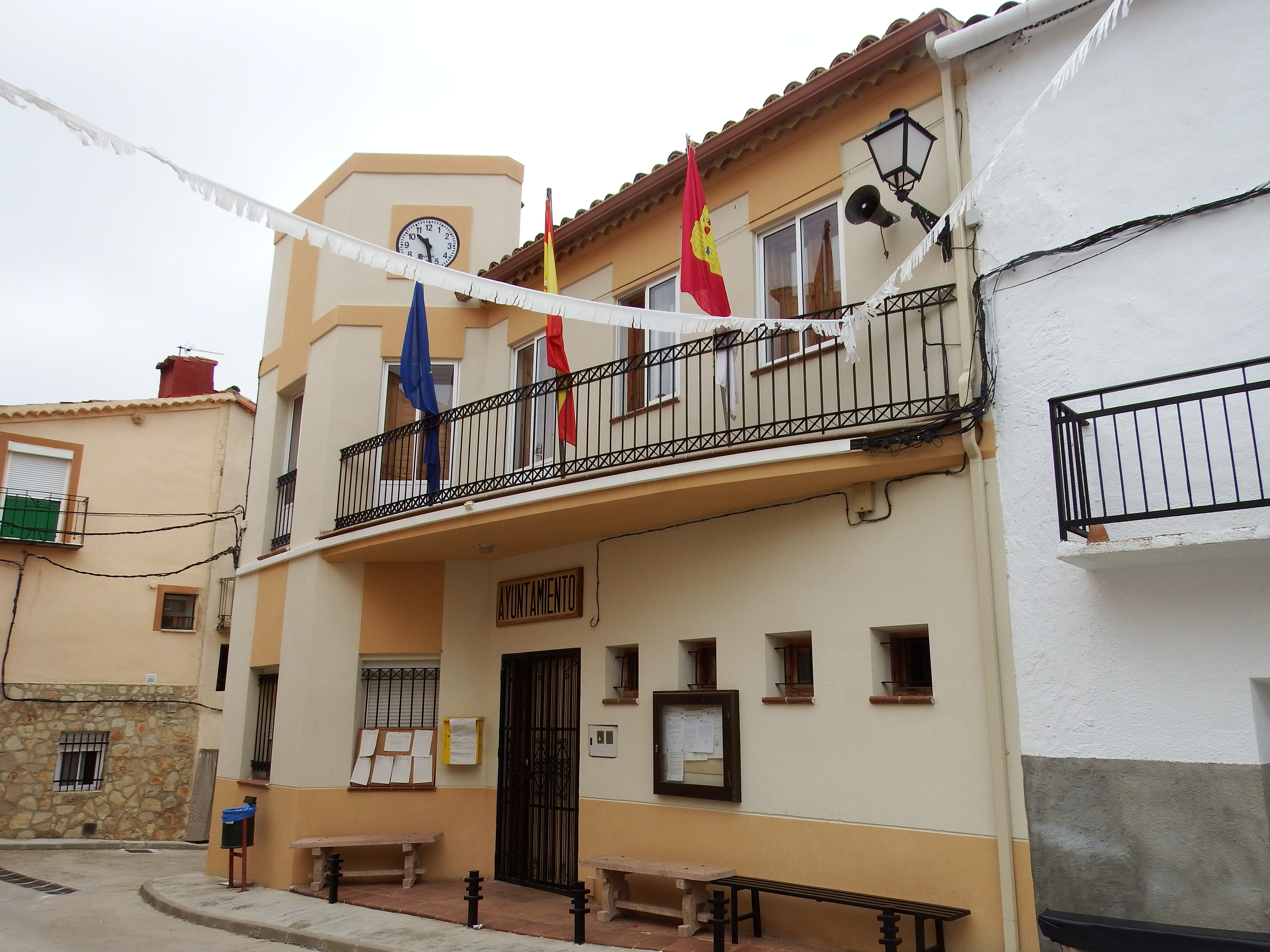
- Town hall of Valdemorillo de la Sierra

- Coat of arms
- Interactive map of Valdemorillo de la Sierra, Spain
- Coordinates: 40°02′N 1°47′W
- Country: Spain
- Autonomous community: Castile-La Mancha
- Province: Cuenca
- Municipality: Valdemorillo de la Sierra

Area
  - Total: 70 km^{2} (27 sq mi)

Population (2025-01-01)
  - Total: 49
  - Density: 0.70/km^{2} (1.8/sq mi)
- Time zone: UTC+1 (CET)
  - Summer (DST): UTC+2 (CEST)

Valdemorillo de la Sierra is a municipality located in the province of Cuenca, Castile-La Mancha, Spain. According to the 2004 census (INE), the municipality has a population of 81 inhabitants.
