= Saceda-Trasierra =

- municipality
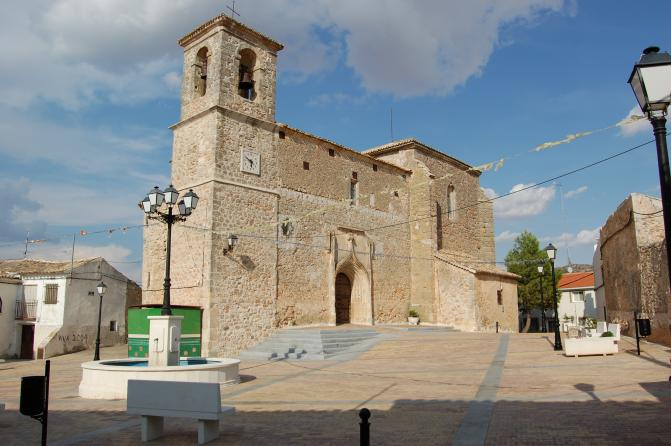
- church of Saceda-Trasierra

- Flag Coat of arms

- Location within Spain Location within Castilla-La Mancha
- Country: Spain
- Autonomous community: Castile-La Mancha
- Province: Cuenca
- Municipality: Saceda-Trasierra

Area
  - Total: 30 km^{2} (12 sq mi)

Population (2025-01-01)
  - Total: 33
  - Density: 1.1/km^{2} (2.8/sq mi)
- Time zone: UTC+1 (CET)
  - Summer (DST): UTC+2 (CEST)

Saceda-Trasierra is a municipality located in the province of Cuenca, Castile-La Mancha, Spain. According to the 2004 census (INE), the municipality has a population of 106 inhabitants.
