= Rozalén del Monte =

Rozalén del Monte, Spain
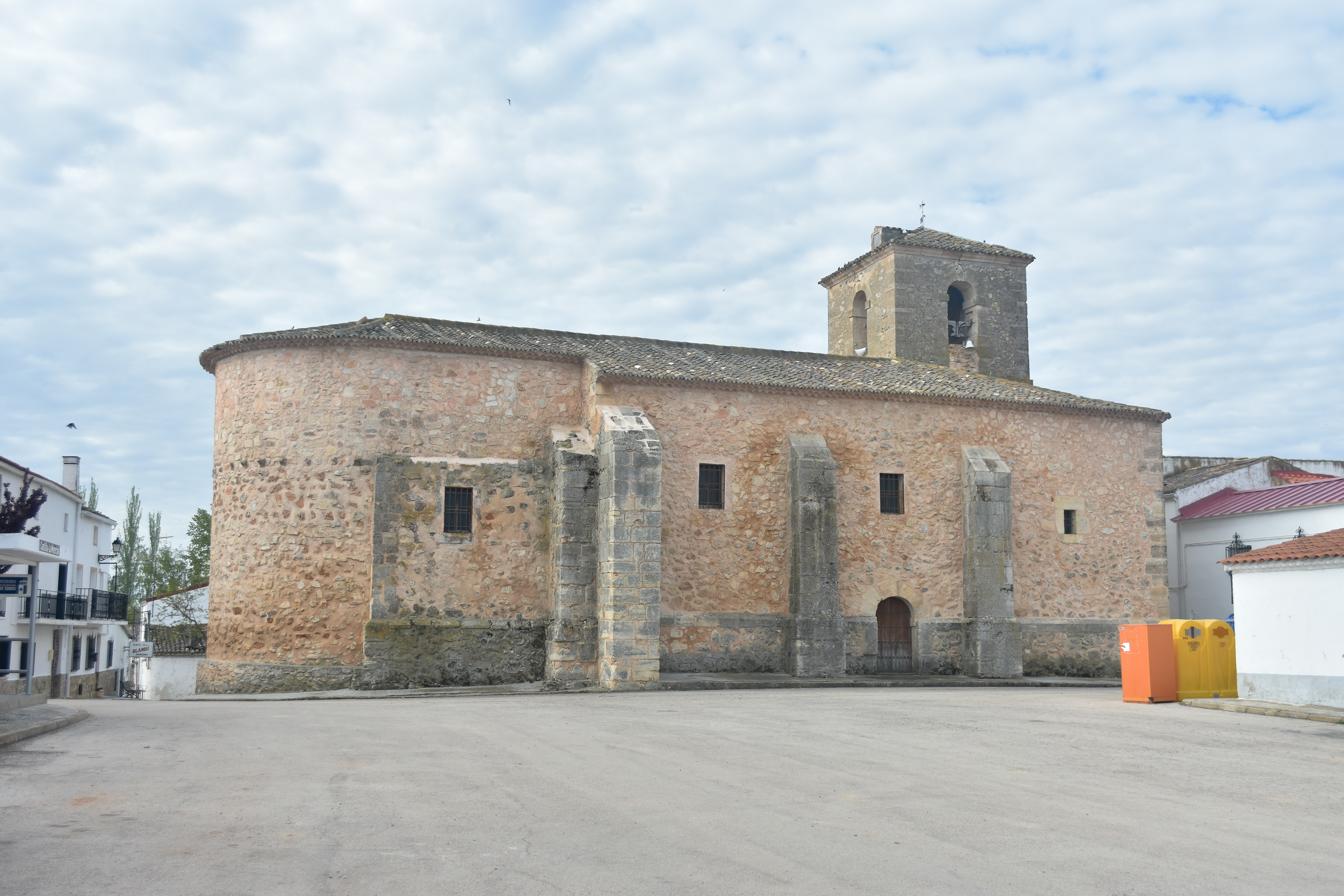
- San Bernabé Church in Rozalén del Monte

- Coat of arms

- Location within Spain Location within Castilla-La Mancha
- Coordinates: 39°59′N 2°48′W
- Country: Spain
- Autonomous community: Castile-La Mancha
- Province: Cuenca
- Municipality: Rozalén del Monte

Area
  - Total: 30 km^{2} (12 sq mi)

Population (2025-01-01)
  - Total: 48
  - Density: 1.6/km^{2} (4.1/sq mi)
- Time zone: UTC+1 (CET)
  - Summer (DST): UTC+2 (CEST)

Rozalén del Monte is a municipality located in the province of Cuenca, Castile-La Mancha, Spain. According to the 2004 census (INE), the municipality has a population of 98 inhabitants.
