= Los Valdecolmenas =

Los Valdecolmenas, Spain
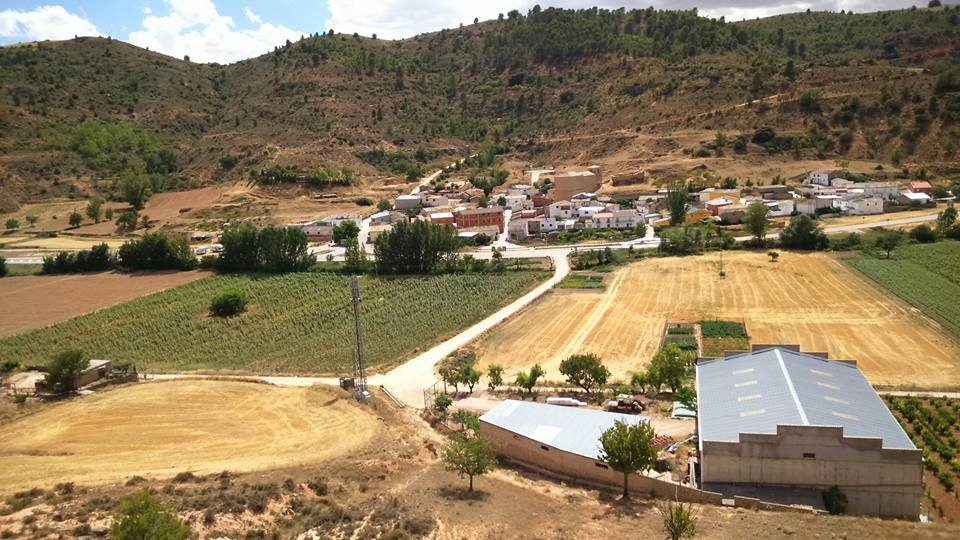
- View of Valdecolmenas de Arriba, Los Valdecolmenas

- Location within Spain Location within Castilla-La Mancha
- Coordinates: 40.1192°N 2.49722°W
- Country: Spain
- Autonomous community: Castile-La Mancha
- Province: Cuenca
- Municipality: Los Valdecolmenas

Area
  - Total: 31 km^{2} (12 sq mi)

Population (2025-01-01)
  - Total: 69
  - Density: 2.2/km^{2} (5.8/sq mi)
- Time zone: UTC+1 (CET)
  - Summer (DST): UTC+2 (CEST)

Los Valdecolmenas is a municipality located in the province of Cuenca, Castile-La Mancha, Spain. According to the 2004 census (INE), the municipality has a population of 111 inhabitants.

The name of Valdecolmenas is a transformation of "Valle de las Colmenas," translated as "Beehive Valley," that was the original.

This resulted in extreme curiosity that the town named "Valdecolmenas de Abajo" (Lower Valdecolmenas) found itself to be situated at a higher elevation than the town named "Valdecolmenas de Arriba," (Upper Valdecolmenas). The origin of this unusual name can be traced to the Middle Ages, when the names given were based, apparently, on their position with respect to the major river that runs through the Valley.
