= Salmeroncillos =

- municipality
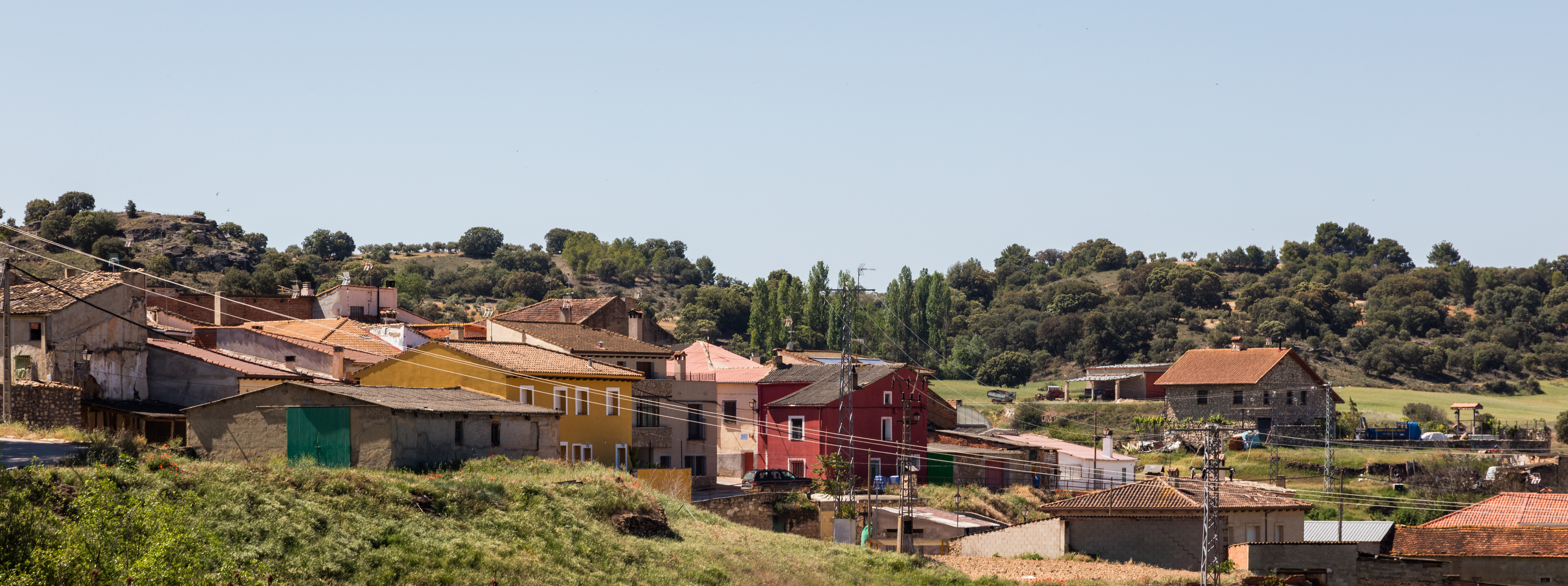
- View of Salmeroncillos

- Location within Spain Location within Castilla-La Mancha
- Coordinates: 40°30′N 2°31′W
- Country: Spain
- Autonomous community: Castile-La Mancha
- Province: Cuenca
- Municipality: Salmeroncillos

Area
  - Total: 20 km^{2} (7.7 sq mi)

Population (2025-01-01)
  - Total: 106
  - Density: 5.3/km^{2} (14/sq mi)
- Time zone: UTC+1 (CET)
  - Summer (DST): UTC+2 (CEST)

Salmeroncillos is a municipality located in the province of Cuenca, Castile-La Mancha, Spain. According to the 2004 census (INE), the municipality has a population of 176 inhabitants.
