= Torrubia del Campo =

Torrubia del Campo, Spain
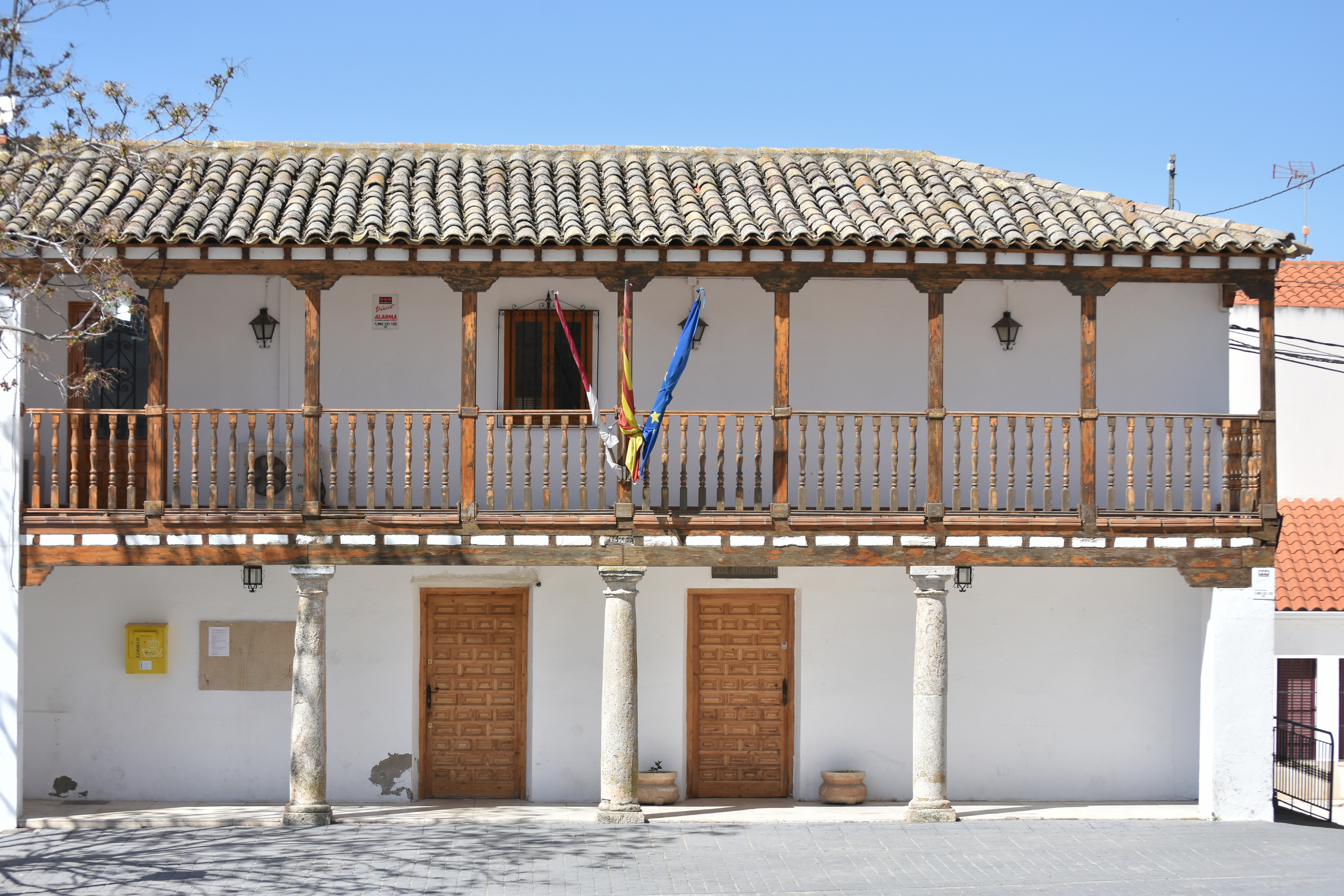
- Town hall

- Coat of arms

- Location within Spain Location within Castilla-La Mancha
- Coordinates: 39°54′N 2°57′W
- Country: Spain
- Autonomous community: Castile-La Mancha
- Province: Cuenca
- Municipality: Torrubia del Campo

Area
  - Total: 53 km^{2} (20 sq mi)

Population (2025-01-01)
  - Total: 312
  - Density: 5.9/km^{2} (15/sq mi)
- Time zone: UTC+1 (CET)
  - Summer (DST): UTC+2 (CEST)

Torrubia del Campo is a municipality located in the province of Cuenca, Castile-La Mancha, Spain. According to the 2004 census (INE), the municipality has a population of 334 inhabitants.
