= Valdemoro-Sierra =

Valdemoro-Sierra, Spain
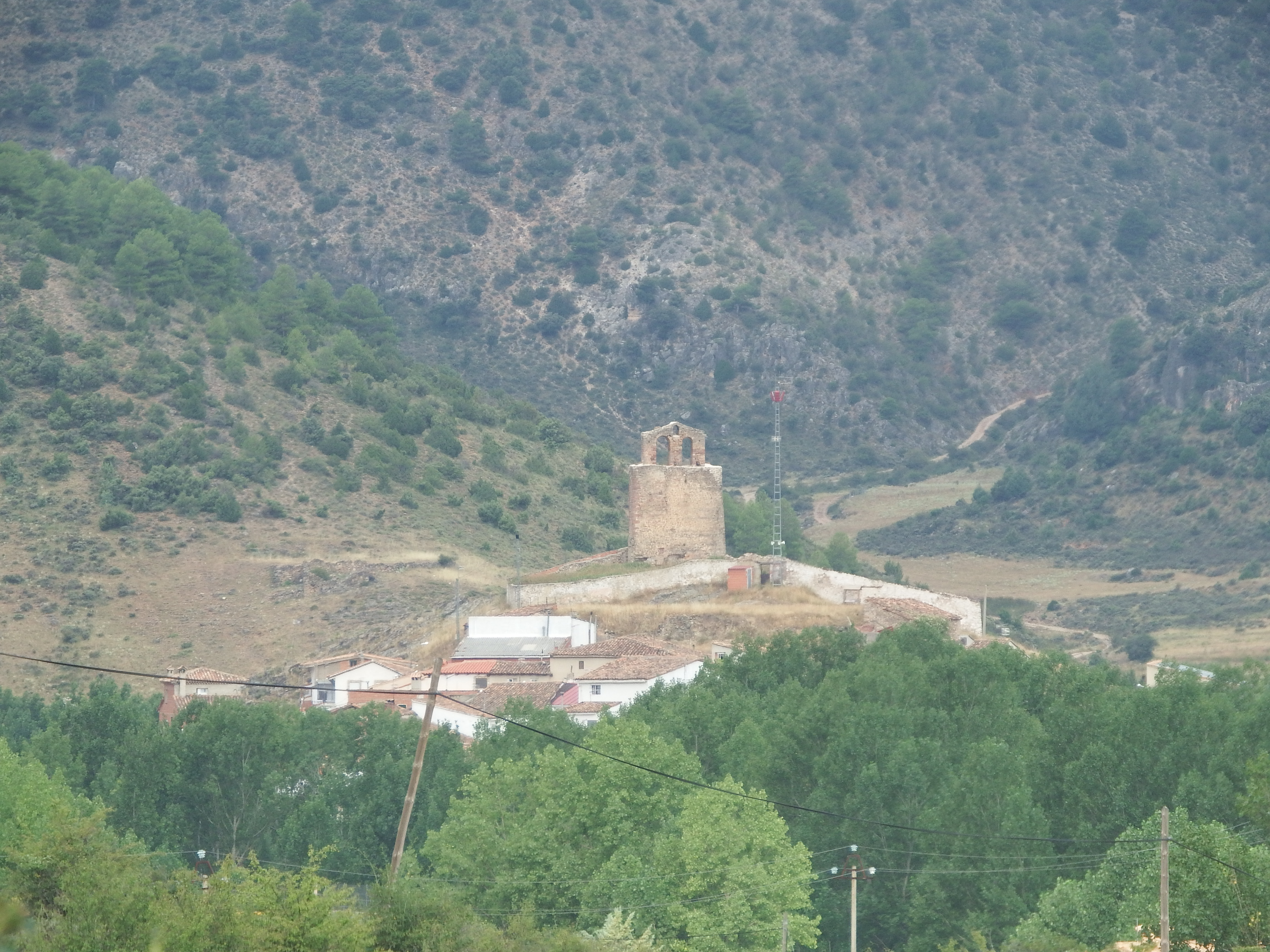
- Valdemoro-Sierra - general view of the town

- Flag Coat of arms

- Location within Spain Location within Castilla-La Mancha
- Coordinates: 40°06′N 1°46′W
- Country: Spain
- Autonomous community: Castile-La Mancha
- Province: Cuenca
- Municipality: Valdemoro-Sierra

Area
  - Total: 108 km^{2} (42 sq mi)

Population (2025-01-01)
  - Total: 96
  - Density: 0.89/km^{2} (2.3/sq mi)
- Time zone: UTC+1 (CET)
  - Summer (DST): UTC+2 (CEST)

Valdemoro-Sierra is a municipality located in the province of Cuenca, Castile-La Mancha, Spain. According to the 2004 census (INE), the municipality has a population of 173.
