= Masegosa =

- Municipality
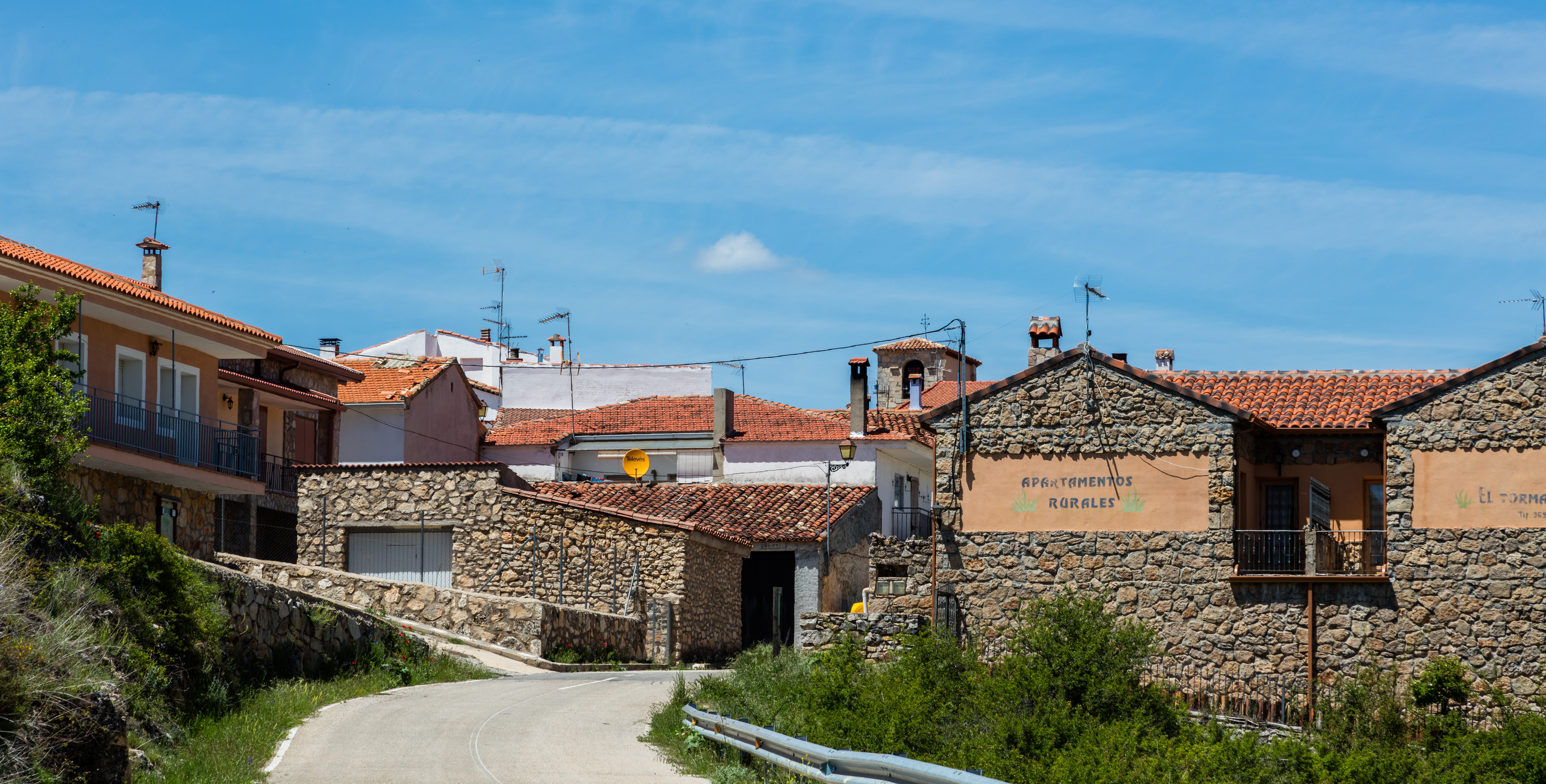
- Masegosa, Cuenca, Spain

- Location within Spain Location within Castilla-La Mancha
- Coordinates: 40°33′N 2°01′W
- Country: Spain
- Autonomous community: Castile-La Mancha
- Province: Cuenca

Population (2025-01-01)
  - Total: 58
- Time zone: UTC+1 (CET)
  - Summer (DST): UTC+2 (CEST)

Masegosa is a municipality in Cuenca, Castile-La Mancha, Spain. It has a population of 122.
