= Piqueras del Castillo =

- municipality
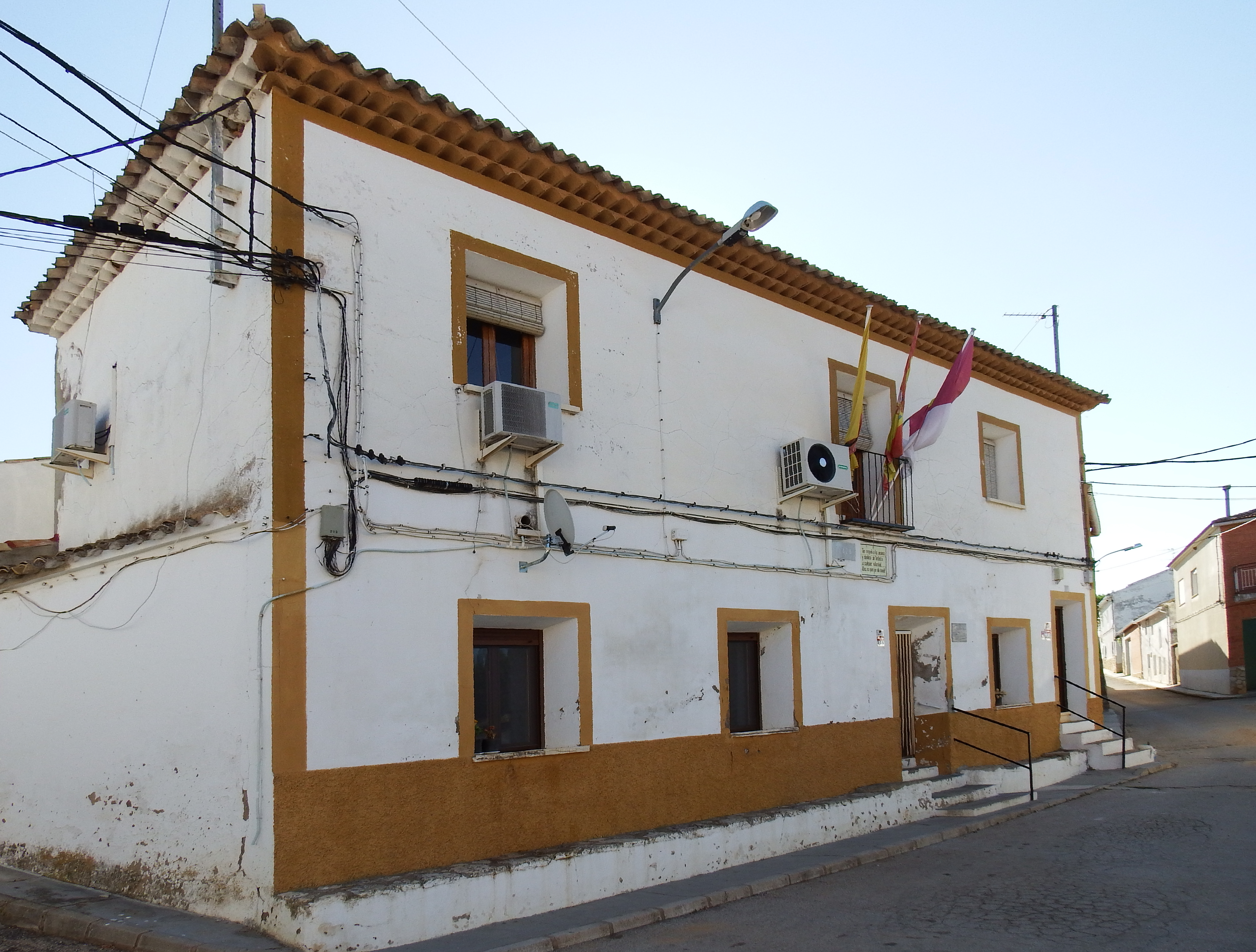
- Town hall of Piqueras del Castillo

- Coat of arms
- Interactive map of Piqueras del Castillo
- Coordinates: 39°43′N 2°04′W
- Country: Spain
- Autonomous community: Castile-La Mancha
- Province: Cuenca

Area
  - Total: 45 km^{2} (17 sq mi)

Population (2025-01-01)
  - Total: 36
  - Density: 0.80/km^{2} (2.1/sq mi)
- Time zone: UTC+1 (CET)
  - Summer (DST): UTC+2 (CEST)

Piqueras del Castillo is a municipality located in the province of Cuenca, Castile-La Mancha, Spain. According to the 2004 census (INE), the municipality has a population of 82 inhabitants.
