= Campillos-Paravientos =

Municipality of Spain

- Municipality
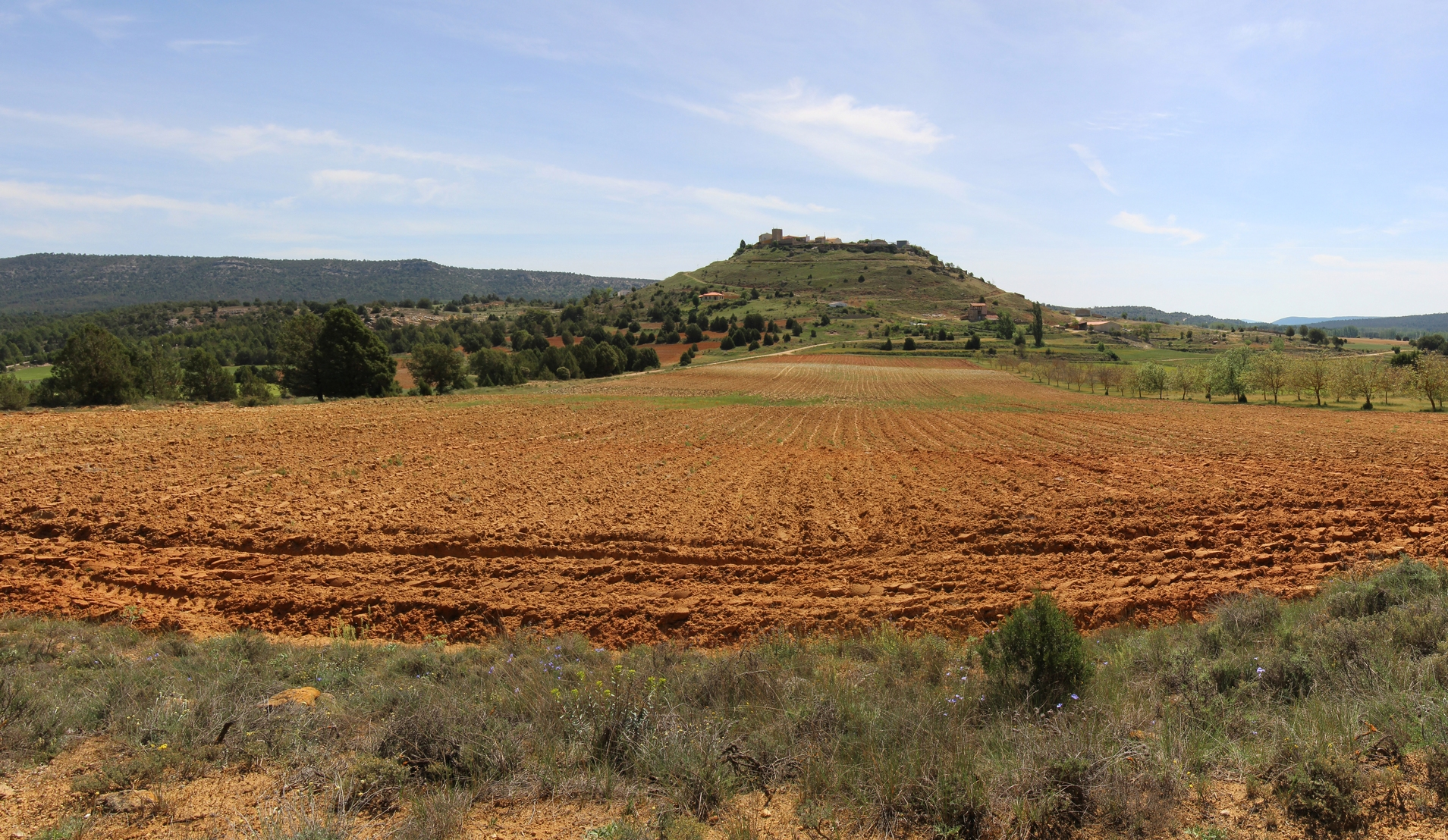

- Location within Spain Location within Castilla-La Mancha
- Coordinates: 39°59′N 1°33′W
- Country: Spain
- Autonomous community: Castile-La Mancha
- Province: Cuenca

Population (2025-01-01)
  - Total: 112
- Time zone: UTC+1 (CET)
  - Summer (DST): UTC+2 (CEST)

Campillos-Paravientos is a municipality in Cuenca, Castile-La Mancha, Spain. It has a population of 140.
