= Boniches =

Municipality of Spain

- Municipality
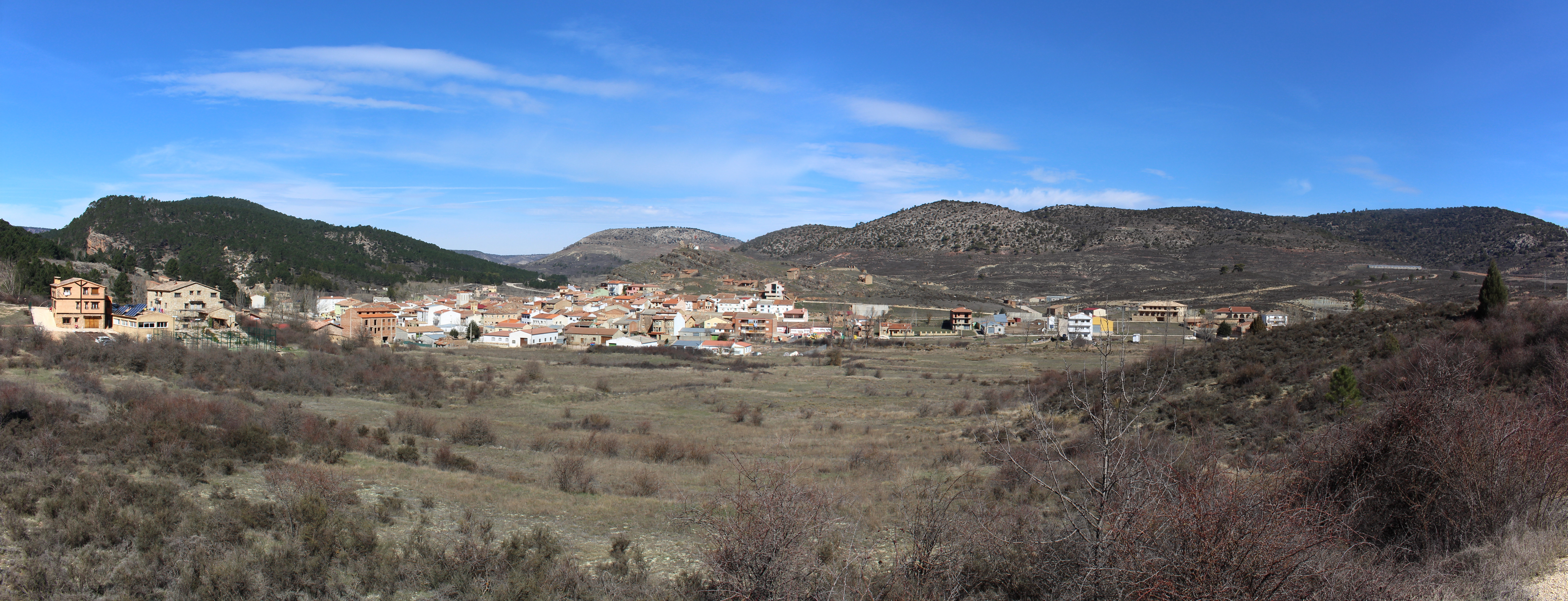

- Flag Coat of arms

- Location within Spain Location within Castilla-La Mancha
- Coordinates: 39°57′7″N 1°37′27″W
- Country: Spain
- Autonomous community: Castile-La Mancha
- Province: Cuenca

Population (2025-01-01)
  - Total: 135
- Time zone: UTC+1 (CET)
  - Summer (DST): UTC+2 (CEST)

Boniches is a municipality located in the province of Cuenca, Castile-La Mancha, Spain. It has a population of 145 (2014).
