= Albendea =

Municipality of Spain

- Municipality
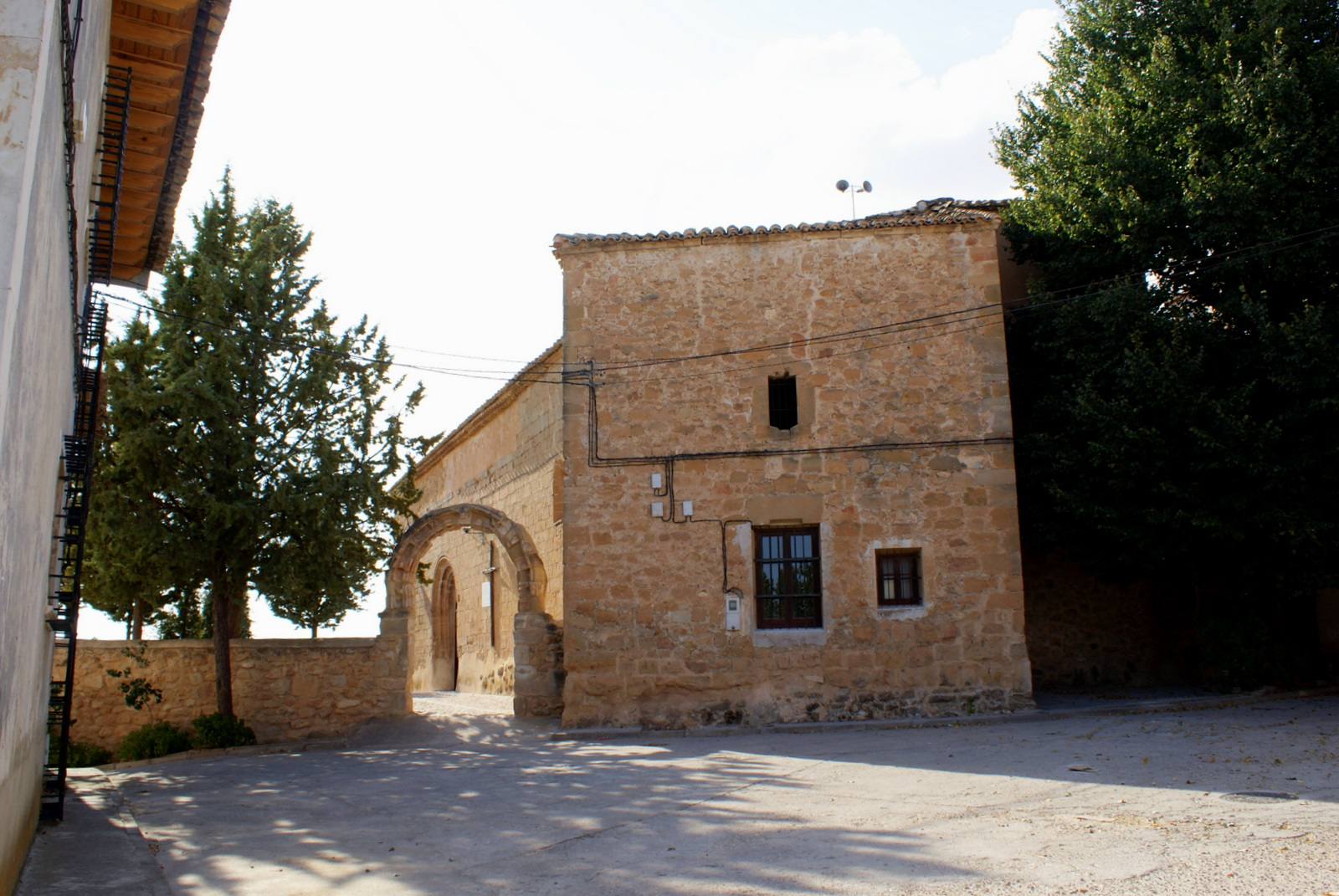

- Flag Coat of arms

- Location within Spain Location within Castilla-La Mancha
- Coordinates: 40°29′N 2°25′W
- Country: Spain
- Autonomous community: Castile-La Mancha
- Province: Cuenca

Population (2025-01-01)
  - Total: 132
- Time zone: UTC+1 (CET)
  - Summer (DST): UTC+2 (CEST)

Albendea is a municipality in Cuenca, Castile-La Mancha, Spain. It has a population of 125 as of 2020.
