= Chumillas =

- Municipality
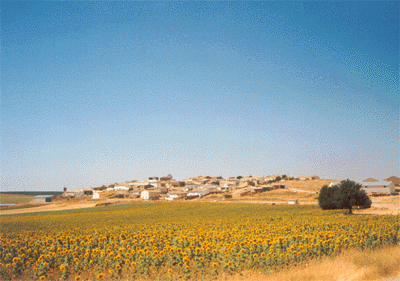

- Location within Spain Location within Castilla-La Mancha
- Coordinates: 39°46′N 2°02′W
- Country: Spain
- Autonomous community: Castile-La Mancha
- Province: Cuenca

Population (2025-01-01)
  - Total: 49
- Time zone: UTC+1 (CET)
  - Summer (DST): UTC+2 (CEST)

Chumillas is a village and municipality in the Cuenca province of Spain, part of the autonomous community of Castile-La Mancha. With an economy based on arable and livestock farming, the population of the village has been in decline as its inhabitants have moved away to large cities, including Valencia, Madrid and Barcelona as well as Cuenca itself.

Currently the village has around 15 inhabitants during winter, rising in summer to around 300.

The most important sights in the village are the tower and the church.
