= Pinarejo =

- municipality
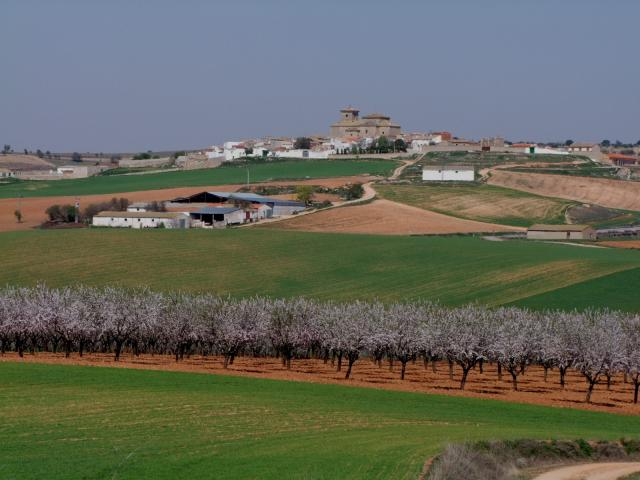

- Flag Coat of arms

- Location within Spain Location within Castilla-La Mancha
- Country: Spain
- Autonomous community: Castile-La Mancha
- Province: Cuenca

Area
  - Total: 61.82 km^{2} (23.87 sq mi)

Population (2025-01-01)
  - Total: 172
  - Density: 2.78/km^{2} (7.21/sq mi)
- Time zone: UTC+1 (CET)
  - Summer (DST): UTC+2 (CEST)

Pinarejo is a municipality located in the province of Cuenca, Castile-La Mancha, Spain. According to the 2004 census (INE), the municipality had a population of 361 inhabitants.
