= Alarcón Dam =

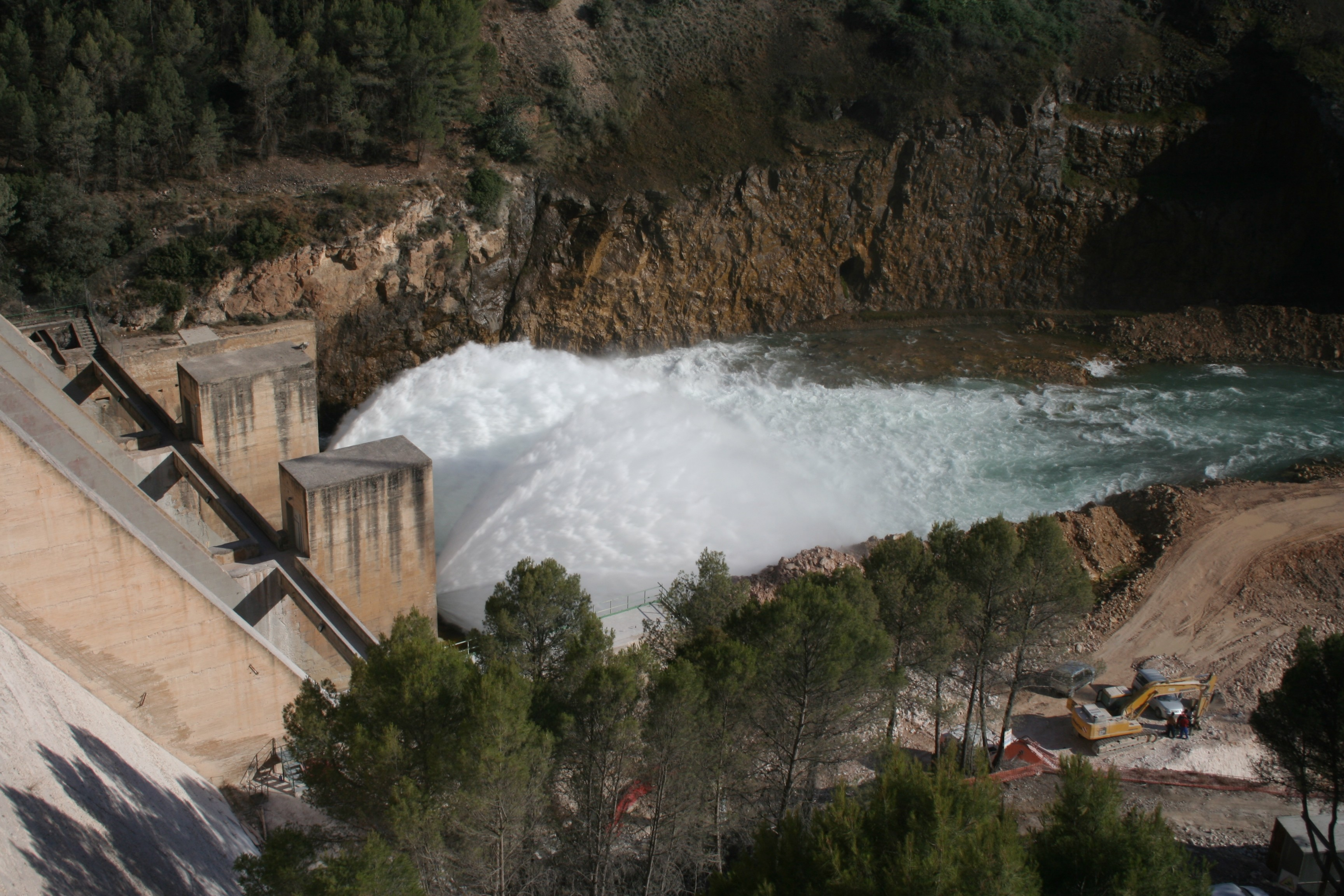
- Alarcón Dam, at the head of the reservoir

- Location of the Alarcón Dam in Castilla-La Mancha Location of the Alarcón Dam in Spain
- Official name: Presa de Alarcón
- Country: Spain
- Location: Province of Cuenca
- Coordinates: 39°33′54″N 2°6′47″W
- Purpose: Irrigation, power
- Construction began: 1941
- Opening date: 1952
- Owner: Government of Spain

Dam and spillways
- Type of dam: Gravity dam
- Impounds: Júcar River
- Height (foundation): 67 m (220 ft)
- Length: 317 m (1,040 ft)
- Elevation at crest: 814 m (2,671 ft)
- Dam volume: 229,630 m^{3} (300,340 cu yd)
- Spillway capacity: 1,750 m^{3}/s (62,000 cu ft/s)

Reservoir
- Total capacity: 1,112,000,000 m^{3} (902,000 acre⋅ft)
- Catchment area: 3,033 km^{2} (1,171 mi^{2})
- Surface area: 6,840 ha (26.4 mi^{2})

Power Station
- Commission date: 1955
- Installed capacity: 56 MW

The Alarcón Dam (Spanish: Presa de Alarcón, Pantano de Alarcón, or Embalse de Alarcón) is a gravity dam on the upper course of the Júcar River. It is located 6 kilometres (3.7 mi) from Alarcón, in the province of Cuenca, in the autonomous community of Castilla-La Mancha, Spain.

The reservoir formed by the dam has a water capacity of 1,112 million cubic metres (902 thousand acre-feet) and spans a surface area of 6,840 hectares (26 square miles). All together, its drainage basin measures 3,033 km^{2} (1,171 mi^{2}). The dam houses a hydroelectric power plant with an installed power capacity of 56 MW.

The Tagus-Segura Water Transfer, which links two other major rivers, joins the reservoir briefly on its journey south, entering at the northern tail end and mixing its waters with the Júcar.

Construction of the dam began in 1941 through the efforts of Valencian farmers who wanted to stabilize the flow of the river, as irrigation in the province of Valencia depends on that supply of water. This initiative is unique in Spanish history because rather than the State, it was the farmers who assumed the total cost of the project, having organized under the Unidad Sindical de Usuarios del Júcar (USUJ, Júcar Users' Coalition), an alliance of irrigation communities.

Beneath the waters of the Alarcón Reservoir rest the remains of the town of Gascas, which was flooded after the building of the dam. When the water level drops, one can see traces of the streets and walls, as well as a stone wall with an arch.

The reservoir is located within the municipal districts of the following towns (from east to west): Alarcón, Olmedilla de Alarcón, Tébar, Cañada Juncosa, Buenache de Alarcón, Honrubia, Torrubia del Castillo, Hontecillas, Valverde de Júcar, Castillo de Garcimuñoz, Villaverde y Pasaconsol, La Almarcha, Belmontejo, and Olivares de Júcar.
