= Entrepeñas Reservoir =

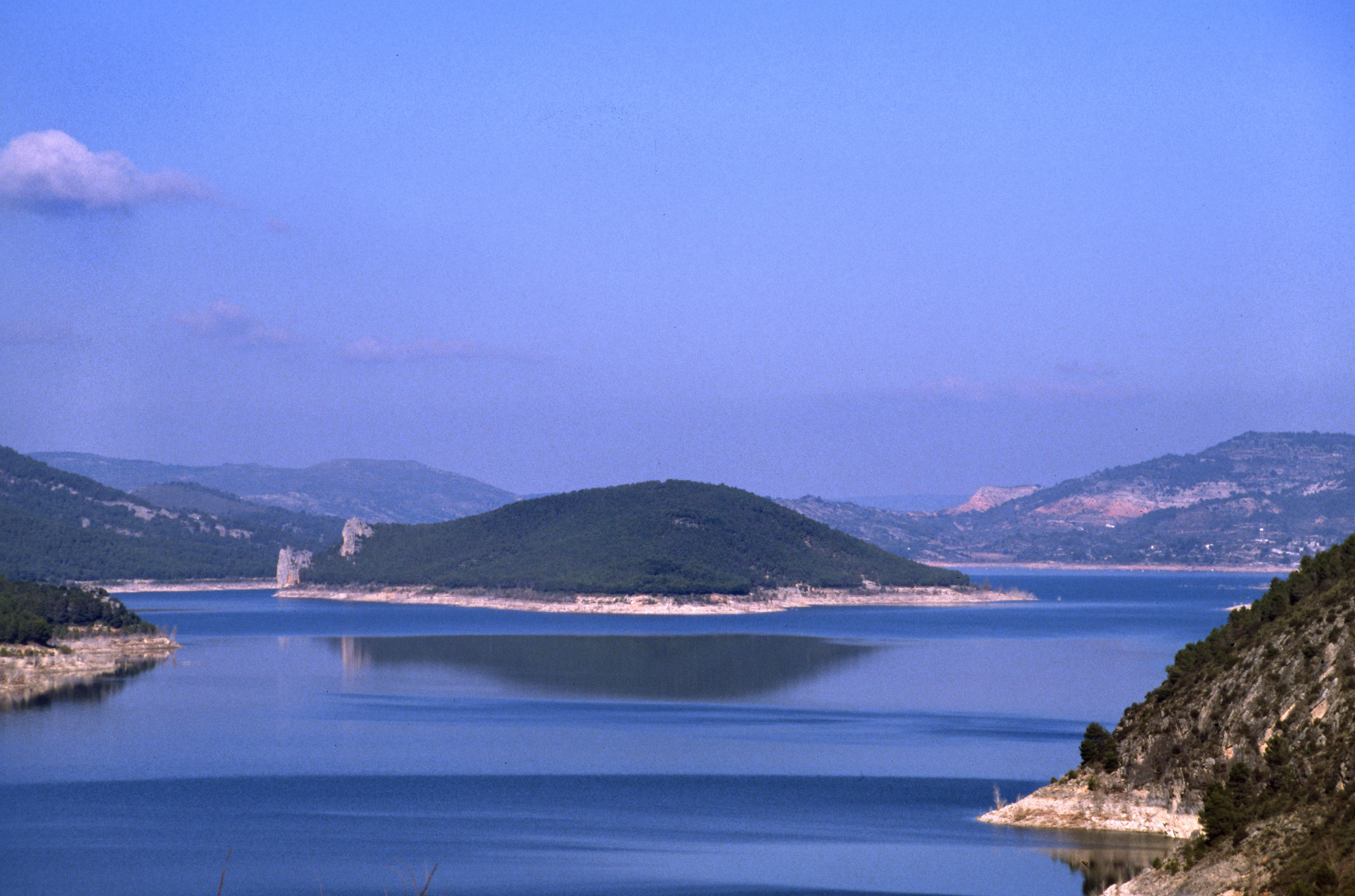

- Location of Entrepeñas Reservoir in Castilla-La Mancha Location of Entrepeñas Reservoir in Spain
- Official name: Embalse de Entrepeñas
- Country: Spain
- Location: Province of Guadalajara
- Coordinates: 40°29′38″N 2°44′56″W
- Purpose: Irrigation, power, transfer
- Status: Operational
- Opening date: 1956
- Owner: Government of Spain

Dam and spillways
- Type of dam: Gravity dam
- Impounds: Tagus River
- Height (foundation): 87 m (285 ft)
- Length: 383 m (1,257 ft)
- Elevation at crest: 723 m (2,372 ft)
- Dam volume: 445,930,000 m^{3} (583,250,000 cu yd)
- Spillways: 1
- Spillway capacity: 1,500 m^{3}/s (53,000 cu ft/s)

Reservoir
- Total capacity: 835,000,000 m^{3} (677,000 acre⋅ft)
- Catchment area: 4,060 km^{2} (1,570 mi^{2})
- Surface area: 3,213 ha (12.41 mi^{2})

Central Hidroeléctrica de Entrepeñas
- Installed capacity: 37 MW
- Website; Association of Dams and Reservoirs

Entrepeñas is a reservoir located on the Tagus River in the Alcarria Baja region of Guadalajara, Spain. It was completed in 1956.

Apart from the Tagus, it also receives water from the Valdetrigo, Barranco Grande, Solana, and Ompólveda rivers, among others. The dam structure is situated next to the town of Entrepeñas, from which it took its name, between the municipal districts of Sacedón and Auñón.

The towns of Auñón, Durón, Pareja, and Sacedón are located on the banks of the reservoir, as are the residential areas of Las Anclas, Las Brisas, Peñalagos, and El Paraiso. Entrepeñas forms part of the so-called Sea of Castile (Spanish: Mar de Castilla), together with the reservoirs of Buendía, Bolarque, Zorita, Almoguera, and Estremera.

The surface area of the reservoir measures 3,213 hectares (12.41 square miles), and it can hold a total of 835,000,000 cubic meters (677,000 acre-feet).

In conjunction with the Buendía Reservoir, it supplies the Tagus-Segura Water Transfer.

== See also ==
List of dams and reservoirs in Spain
