= Guadiela =

River in Spain

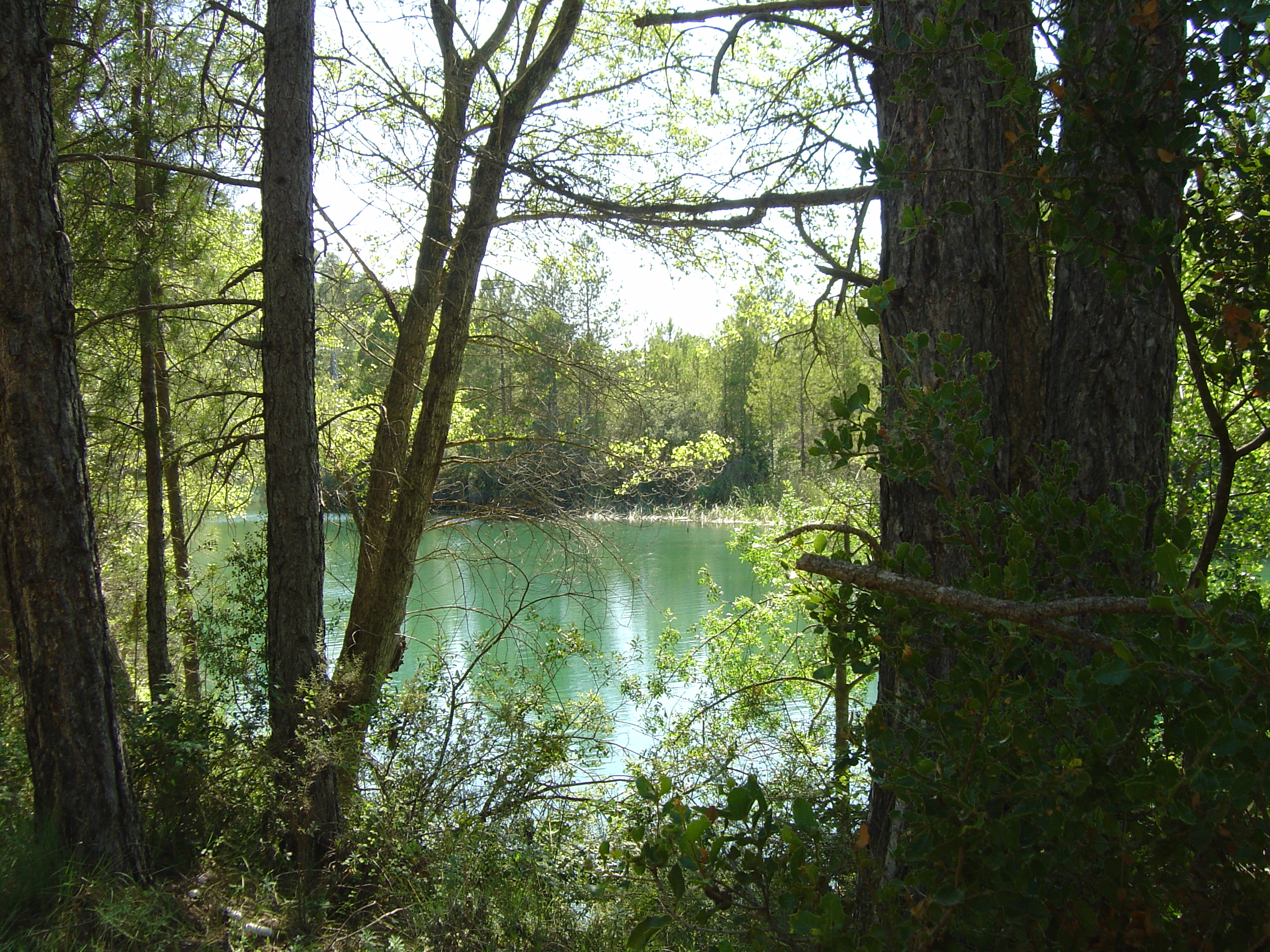

Location
- Country: Spain
- Region: Castilla–La Mancha

Physical characteristics
- Source
  - location: Fuente Pinilla (Serranía de Cuenca)
- Mouth: Tagus
  - coordinates: 40°21′45″N 2°48′58″W
- Length: 117 km (73 mi)

Basin features
- Progression: Tagus→ Atlantic Ocean

The Guadiela is a river in the Iberian Peninsula, a left-bank tributary of the Tagus and the latter's major upper-course tributary.

The Guadiela has its source in the Serranía de Cuenca, near Cueva del Hierro, at the Fuente Pinilla site. It flows from East to West for 117 kilometres (73 mi), passing through the Spanish province of Cuenca, emptying into the Tagus at the Bolarque reservoir, on the border between the provinces of Cuenca and Guadalajara. It is dammed upstream by the Buendía reservoir.

It receives the waters from the Cuervo, Guadamejud, Mayor and Trabaque.

The hydronym Guadiela is formed by 'Guad' (of Arabic origin, conveying the meaning of "river") and the '-iela' suffix (a diminutive).
