= List of dams and reservoirs in Spain =

This is a list of dams and reservoirs in Spain by administrative division.

== Canary Islands ==
- Los Campitos Reservoir

== Castile-La Mancha ==
- Alarcón Dam
- Entrepeñas Reservoir

== Castile and León ==
- Aldeadávila Dam
- Almendra Dam
- El Burguillo Reservoir
- El Charco del Cura Reservoir
- San Juan Reservoir
- Saucelle Dam

== Extremadura ==
- Alcántara Dam
- Arrocampo Reservoir
- Cíjara Dam
- García Sola Reservoir
- La Serena Dam and Reservoir
- Valdecañas reservoir
- Zújar Reservoir

== Galicia ==
- Lake As Pontes

== Madrid ==
- El Atazar Dam
- La Jarosa Reservoir
- Navacerrada Dam
- San Juan Reservoir

== Valencian Community ==
- Arenós Reservoir
- Don Francisco Mira Cánovas Dam
- Tibi Dam
- Ulldecona Dam

== See also ==
- List of dams and reservoirs
- List of submerged places in Spain
