= Bolarque Dam =

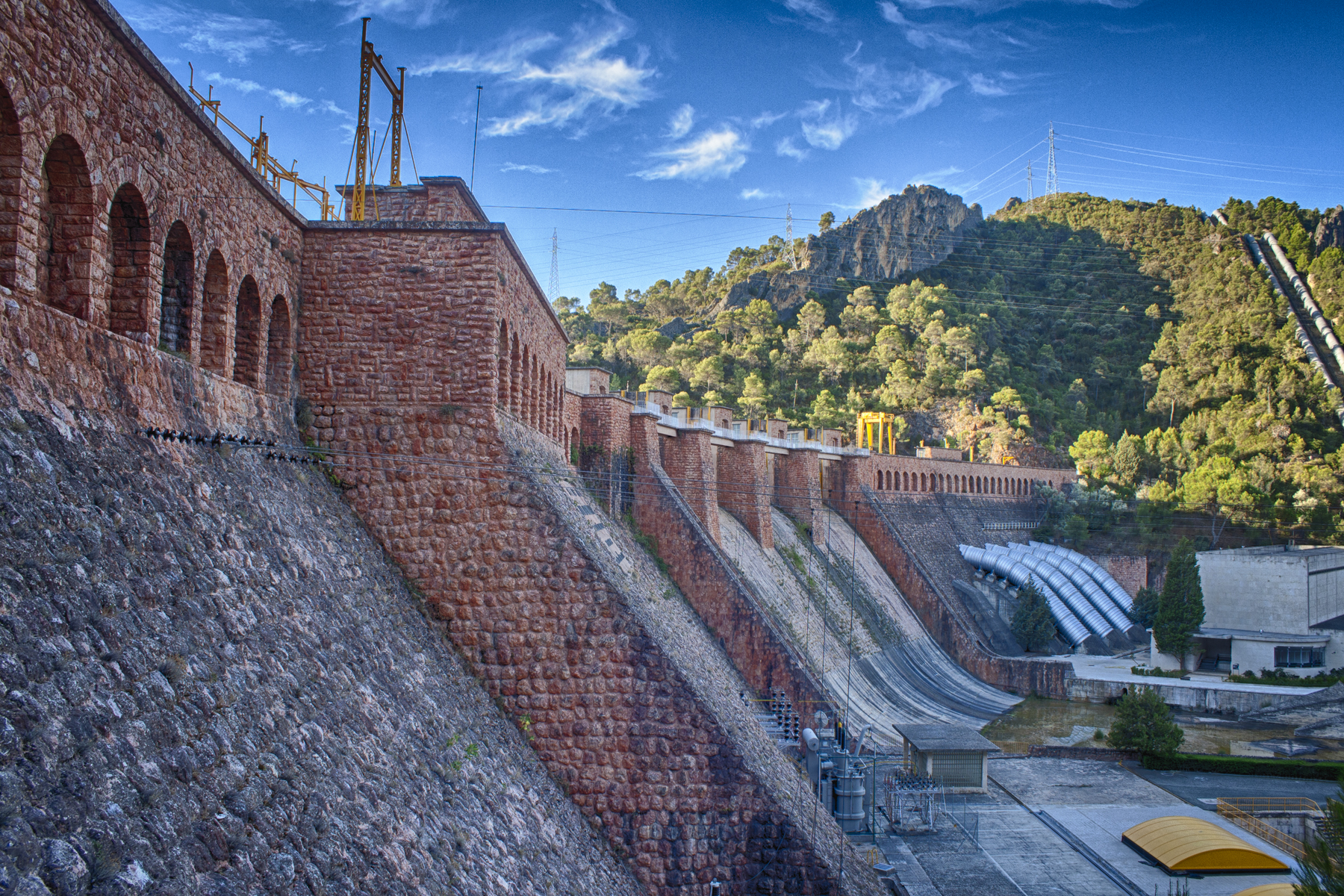

- Location within Spain
- Official name: Presa de Bolarque
- Location: Cuenca and Guadalajara, Spain
- Coordinates: 40.362156°N 2.818685°W
- Purpose: Power
- Status: Operational
- Opening date: 1910
- Owner: Unión Fenosa
- Operator: Unión Fenosa

Dam and spillways
- Type of dam: Concrete gravity dam
- Impounds: Tagus
- Height (foundation): 36 m (118 ft)
- Length: 292 m (958 ft)
- Elevation at crest: 643 m (2,110 ft)
- Dam volume: 160,000 m^{3} (5,700,000 cu ft)
- Spillway type: Over the dam
- Spillway capacity: 1,700 m^{3}/s (1.4 acre⋅ft/s)

Reservoir
- Total capacity: 30,710,000 m^{3} (24,900 acre⋅ft)
- Active capacity: 23,000,000 m^{3} (19,000 acre⋅ft)
- Surface area: 5.1 km^{2} (2.0 mi^{2})

Power Station
- Operator: Unión Fenosa
- Commission date: Bolarque I: 1910; Bolarque II: 1974; Bolarque III: 2010
- Hydraulic head: Bolarque I: 42 m (138 ft) (max); Bolarque II: 269.5 m (884 ft)
- Turbines: Bolarque I: 2 x 14 MW Francis-type; Bolarque II: 4 x 52 MW Francis-type
- Installed capacity: Bolarque I: 28 MW; Bolarque II: 208 MW; Bolarque III: 4,2 MW

Bolarque Dam (Spanish: Presa de Bolarque) is a concrete gravity dam on the Tagus in Spain, where the river forms the border between the provinces of Cuenca and Guadalajara. About 6 km downstream from the dam is the José Cabrera Nuclear Power Station.

Work on the dam began in 1907. In 1908 more than 1300 workers were employed at the construction site. The dam was officially inaugurated on June 23, 1910 by king Alfonso XIII. It is owned by Unión Fenosa.

== Dam ==
Bolarque Dam is a 36 m tall (height above foundation) and 292 m long gravity dam with a crest altitude of 643 m. The volume of the dam is 160,000 m³. The dam features a spillway over the dam (maximum discharge 1,700 m³/s) and one bottom outlet (maximum discharge 70 m³/s). The initial height of the dam was 24 m; it was raised to 36 m in 1954.

== Reservoir ==
At full reservoir level, the reservoir of the dam has a surface area of 5.1 km² and a total capacity of 30.7 mio. m³; its active capacity is 23 mio. m³.

== Power plant ==
=== Bolarque I ===
The original hydroelectric power plant went operational in 1910. The generated power at that time was evacuated to Madrid. In 1954 the plant was closed and replaced with the actual power plant. It has a nameplate capacity of 28 MW and contains 2 Francis turbine-generators with 14 MW each. The maximum hydraulic head is 42 m. Maximum flow is 85 m³/s.

=== Bolarque II ===
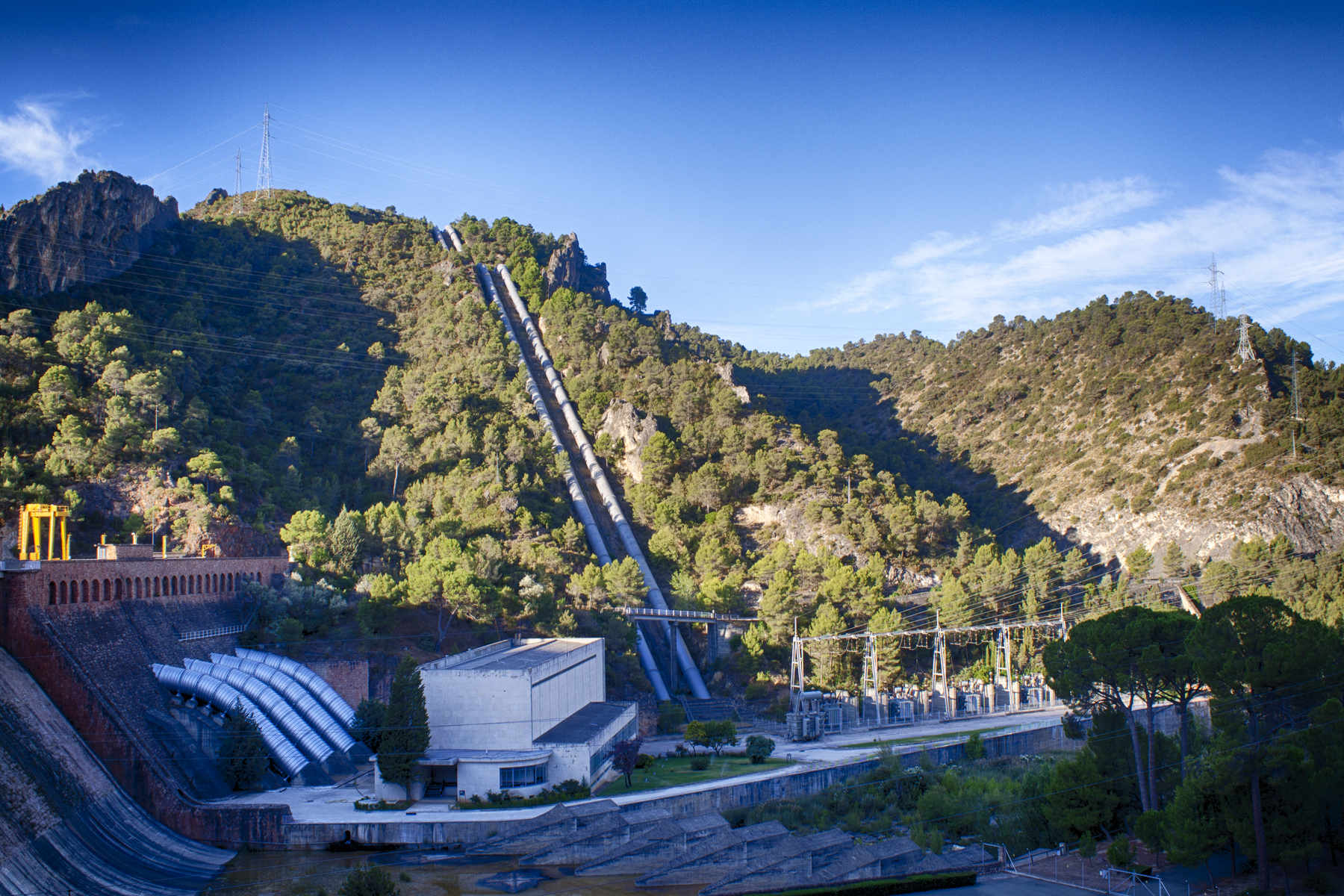
The penstocks of Bolarque 2

The pumped-storage power plant was built between 1969 and 1974. It went on line in 1973. The plant has a nameplate capacity of 203 (208) MW. According to this source, the nameplate capacity is 208 MW when pumping and 239 MW when generating energy. The power station contains 4 reversible Francis turbine-generators with 52 MW each. The maximum hydraulic head is 269.5 (245) m. Maximum flow is 98.8 (99) m³/s when generating energy and 66 m³/s when pumping.

Bolarque II is the starting point of the Tagus-Segura Water Transfer. 2 penstocks (length 1.025 m, diameter 3.15 to 3.45 m) link the pumped-storage power plant with the reservoir of Bujeda dam, which is used as an upper reservoir. From Bujeda reservoir water is then transferred to the reservoir of Alarcón dam.

=== Bolarque III ===
In 2010 an additional power plant with a nameplate capacity of 4.2 MW was opened.

== See also ==
- List of power stations in Spain
- List of dams and reservoirs in Spain
