= Gascas de Alarcón =

- Town in Spain
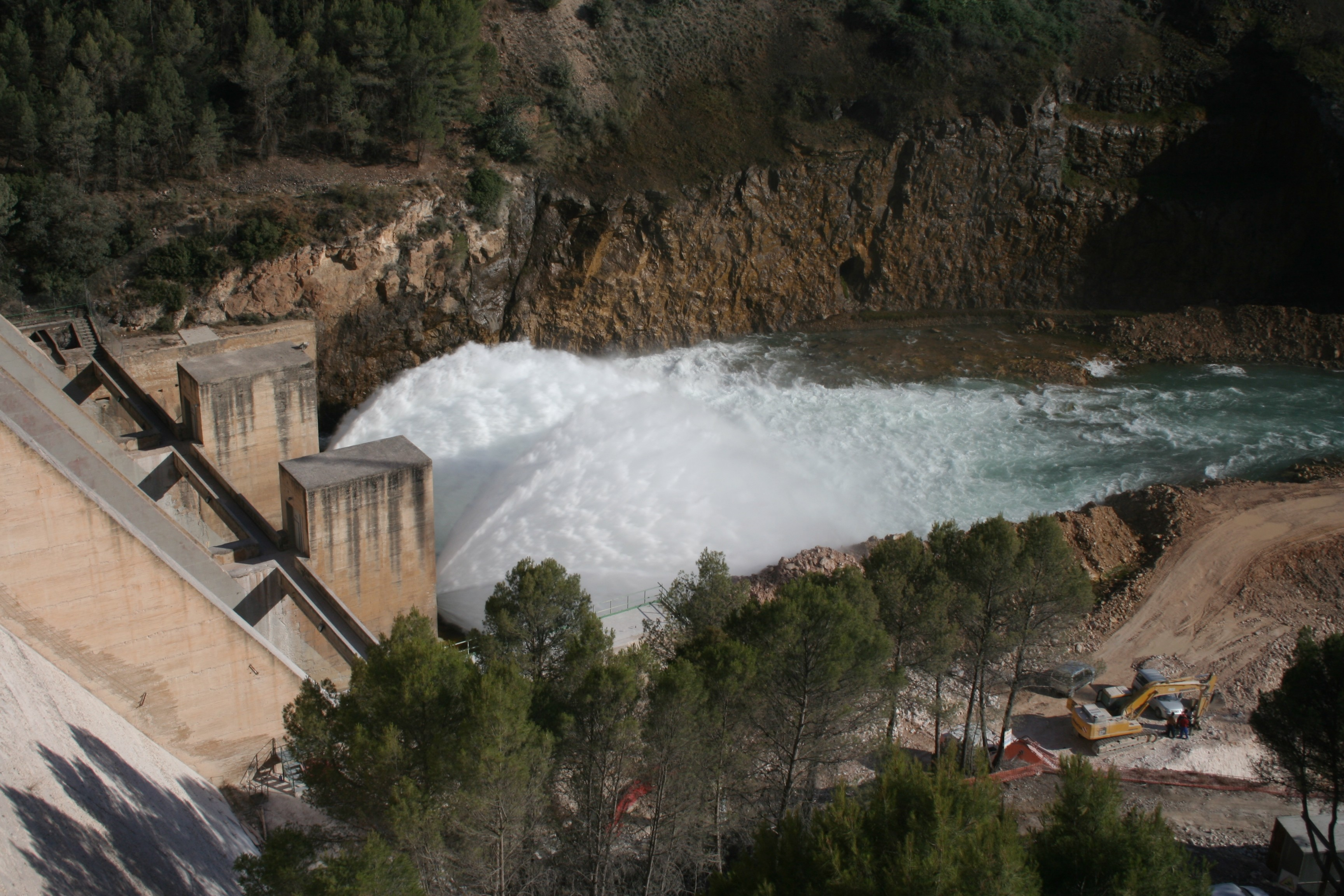
- Alarcón Dam, at the head of the reservoir.
- Interactive map of Gascas de Alarcón
- Country: Spain
- Autonomous Community: Castile-La Mancha
- Province: Cuenca
- Comarca: Manchuela Conquense
- Founded: 13th century
- Demonym: Gasqueño (Spanish)

Gascas de Alarcón is the site of a former town in the province of Cuenca, Spain. It was flooded by the Alarcón Reservoir, which underwent construction from 1946 to 1970 through the initiative of Valencian farmers who wanted to regulate the flow of the Júcar River.

The remains of the town are visible when the water level drops. One can see traces of the streets and walls, as well as a stone wall with an arch, part of a private residence.

The Gascas, a tributary stream of the Júcar, had its source near the town but is now also submerged in the reservoir.

Gascas was a riverside town and one of the few in the province with irrigated farmland. As its economy relied on this resource, the use of water from the Gascas and Júcar for irrigation was strictly rationed for each plot of land. The produce, fruits and vegetables, was sold in other communities across the province.

== History ==
Gascas was built on the left bank of the Júcar and apparently owes its name to its founders, Gascons from France who had followed Eleanor of England, daughter of Eleanor of Aquitaine, to the area. Wife of Alfonso VIII of Castile, she held court for a time in the recently conquered city of Cuenca.

Since 2010, a yearly festival is held in Olmedilla de Alarcón on the first Saturday of August in honor of the inhabitants of Gascas and their descendants. This tradition originated with the inauguration of a monument on the shore of the reservoir at the point nearest the town, and is now sponsored by the officials of Olmedilla.
