= Hierro (disambiguation) =

Hierro may refer to:

== People ==
- Fernando Hierro (born 1968), a former Spanish footballer
- Ignacio Hierro (born 1978), a Mexican footballer for the Atlante F.C.
- Luis Hierro (1915 - 1991), a political figure from Uruguay

== Places ==
- Cueva del Hierro, a municipality in Castile-La Mancha, Spain
- El Hierro, a Spanish island that is part of the Canary Islands
- El Hierro Airport, an airport located on El Hierro island
- Puerta de Hierro (Mexico), a district in Zapopan, Mexico

== Other ==
- Hierro (film), a 2009 psychological thriller directed by Gabe Ibáñez
- El Palacio de Hierro, a chain of department stores in Mexico
- El Hierro Giant Lizard, a species of wall lizard found in El Hierro island
- El Hierro (DO), a Spanish Denominación de Origen for wines from El Hierro island
- Puerta de Hierro (Madrid), a monument in Madrid, Spain
- Hierro (TV series)
