= Lake As Pontes =

Artificial lake in Galicia, Spain

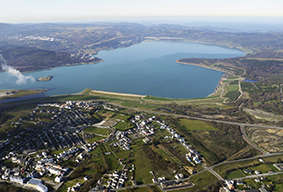

- Location within Galicia Location within Spain
- Interactive map of Lake As Pontes
- Location: As Pontes, A Coruña, Galicia
- Coordinates: 43.4574°N 7.9486°W
- Type: artificial
- Primary inflows: Eume
- Basin countries: Spain
- Managing agency: Endesa
- First flooded: 2008
- Max. length: 5 km (3.1 mi)
- Max. width: 2 km (1.2 mi)
- Surface area: 865 ha (2,140 acres)
- Average depth: 150 m (490 ft)
- Max. depth: 206 m (676 ft)
- Shore length^{1}: 17.8 km (11.1 mi)
- Settlements: As Pontes
- ^{1} Shore length is not a well-defined measure.

Lake As Pontes (Spanish: Lago de As Pontes, Galician: Lago das Pontes), also known as Lake Puentes de García Rodríguez, is an artificial lake in the municipality of As Pontes, Galicia (Spain).

It was created during the reclamation of the former As Pontes open-pit lignite mine, operated by Spanish energy company Endesa, which supplied the nearby thermal power plant (es).

== Background ==
Mining at As Pontes began in 1972. Over 30 years, more than 353 million tonnes of lignite and hundreds of millions of cubic metres of earth were extracted, creating a large pit over 300 metres deep. The mine closed on 31 December 2007. After the mine closed, its owner, Endesa, proposed filling the abandoned pit with water as part of a major land-reclamation project. The plan included restoring the surrounding slopes and creating new habitats for plants and wildlife.

== Filling and completion ==
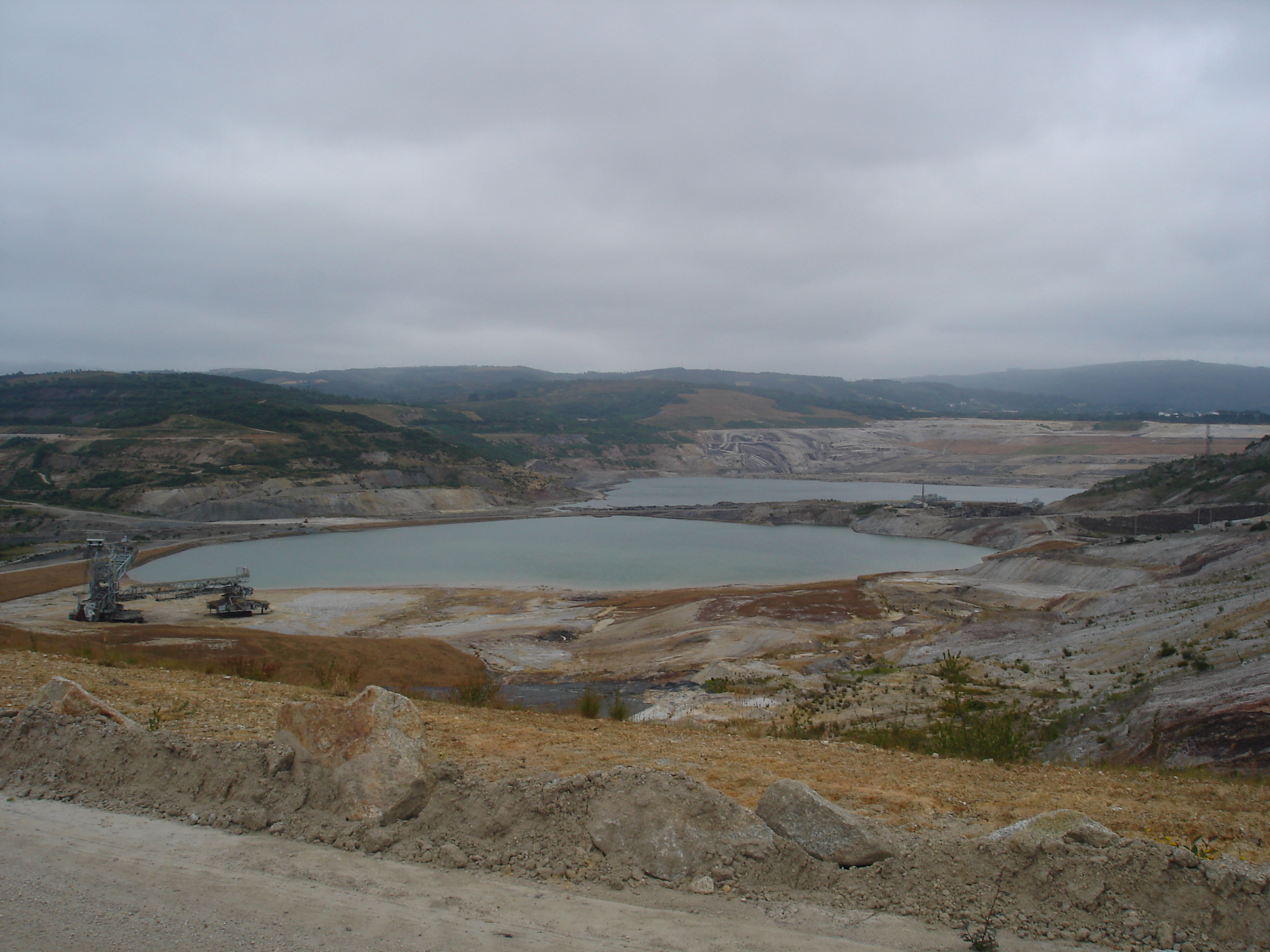
Puentes de García Rodríguez lignite mine in the process of forming the artificial lake (July 20, 2008)

The filling of the mine began in January 2008. Water was supplied mainly from the Eume River, together with rainfall, runoff and water from surrounding areas. The lake eventually reached a capacity of about 547 million cubic metres.

The filling process was completed in April 2012, and the restored site was officially inaugurated in May 2012. The resulting lake is about 5 km long, 2 km wide, and has a maximum depth of approximately 222 metres.

== Ecology ==
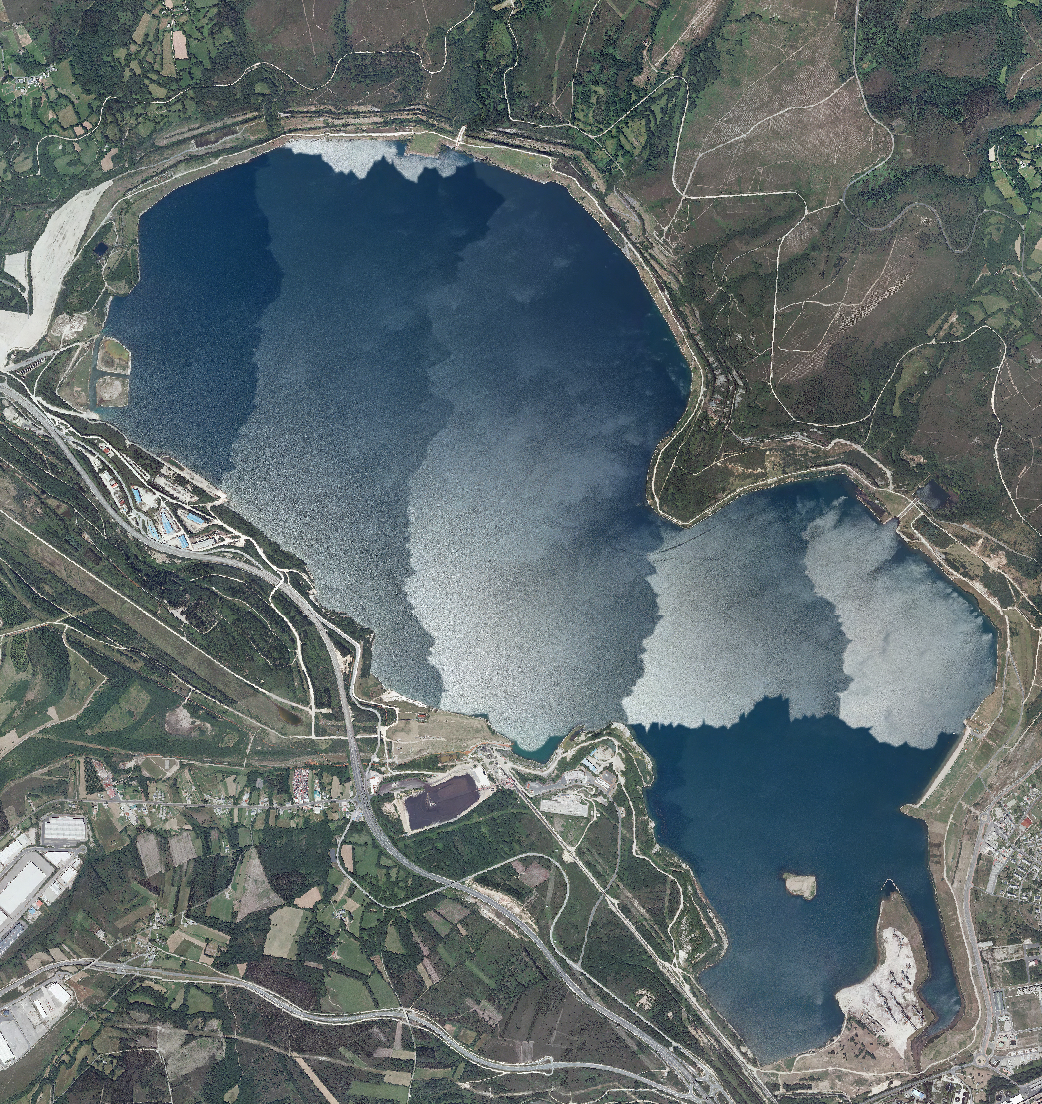
Aerial view of Lake Puentes in 2014

The former mine site was transformed into a large aquatic ecosystem. Two artificial islands were created to encourage the development of vegetation and provide habitats for wildlife. The lake has become a habitat for native and migratory birds, including nesting waterfowl, and has an established birdwatching area.

Fish recorded in the lake include brown trout, stickleback and barbel. The surrounding landscape has also been restored with vegetation, creating a mixture of aquatic, woodland and open habitats.

== See also ==
- List of dams and reservoirs in Spain
