= Auñón =

Auñón, Spain
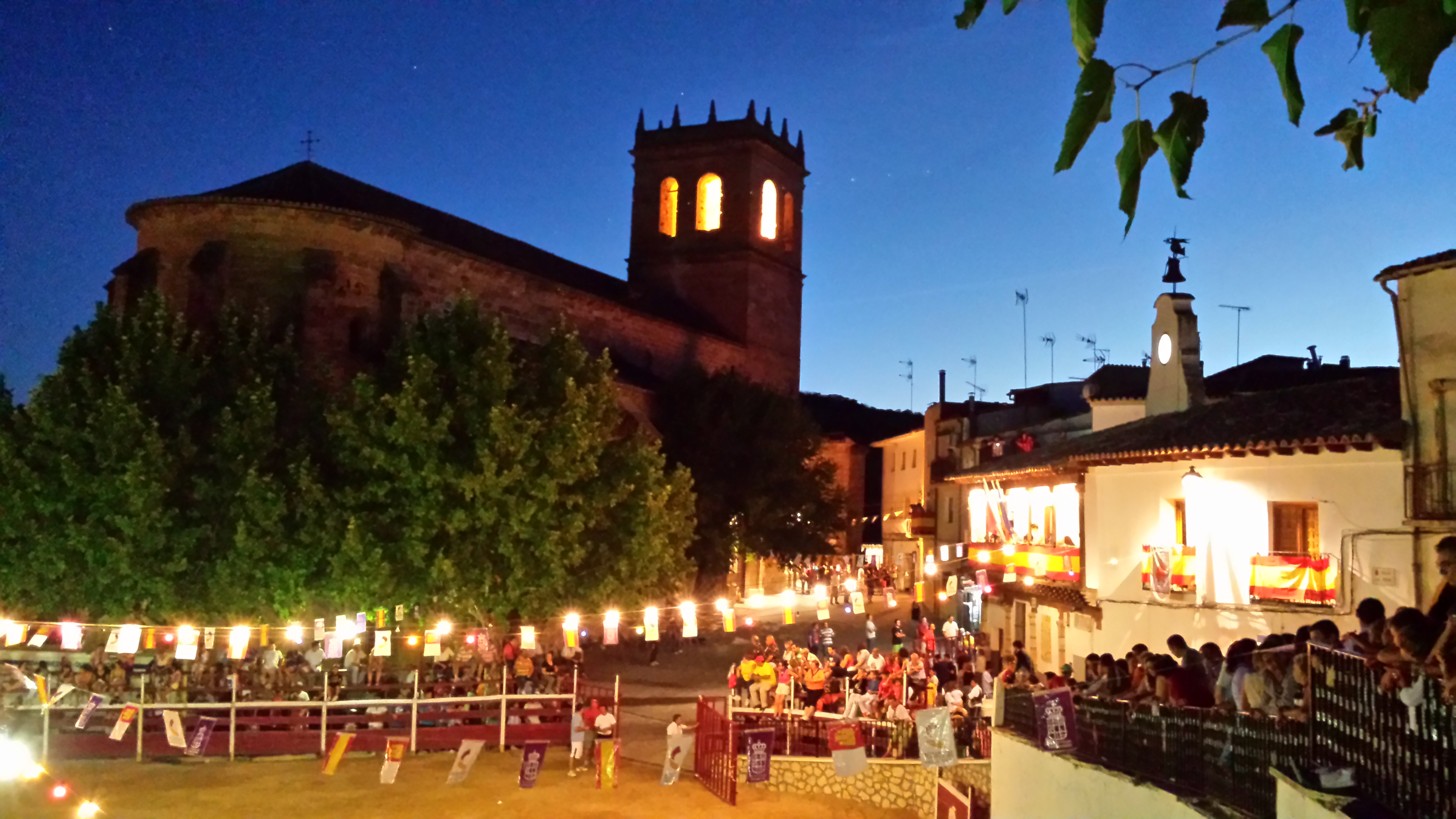

- Coat of arms

- Location within Province of Guadalajara Location within Castilla-La Mancha Location within Spain
- Country: Spain
- Autonomous community: Castile-La Mancha
- Province: Guadalajara
- Municipality: Auñón

Area
  - City: 0.35 km^{2} (0.14 sq mi)
  - Urban: 0.08 km^{2} (0.031 sq mi)

Population (2025-01-01)
  - City: 156
  - Density: 450/km^{2} (1,200/sq mi)
- Time zone: UTC+1 (CET)
  - Summer (DST): UTC+2 (CEST)

Auñón (Spanish pronunciation: [awˈɲon]) is a municipality located in the province of Guadalajara, Castile-La Mancha, Spain. According to the 2004 census (INE), the municipality has a population of 254 inhabitants.
