= Los Campitos Reservoir =

Reservoir on the Canary Islands

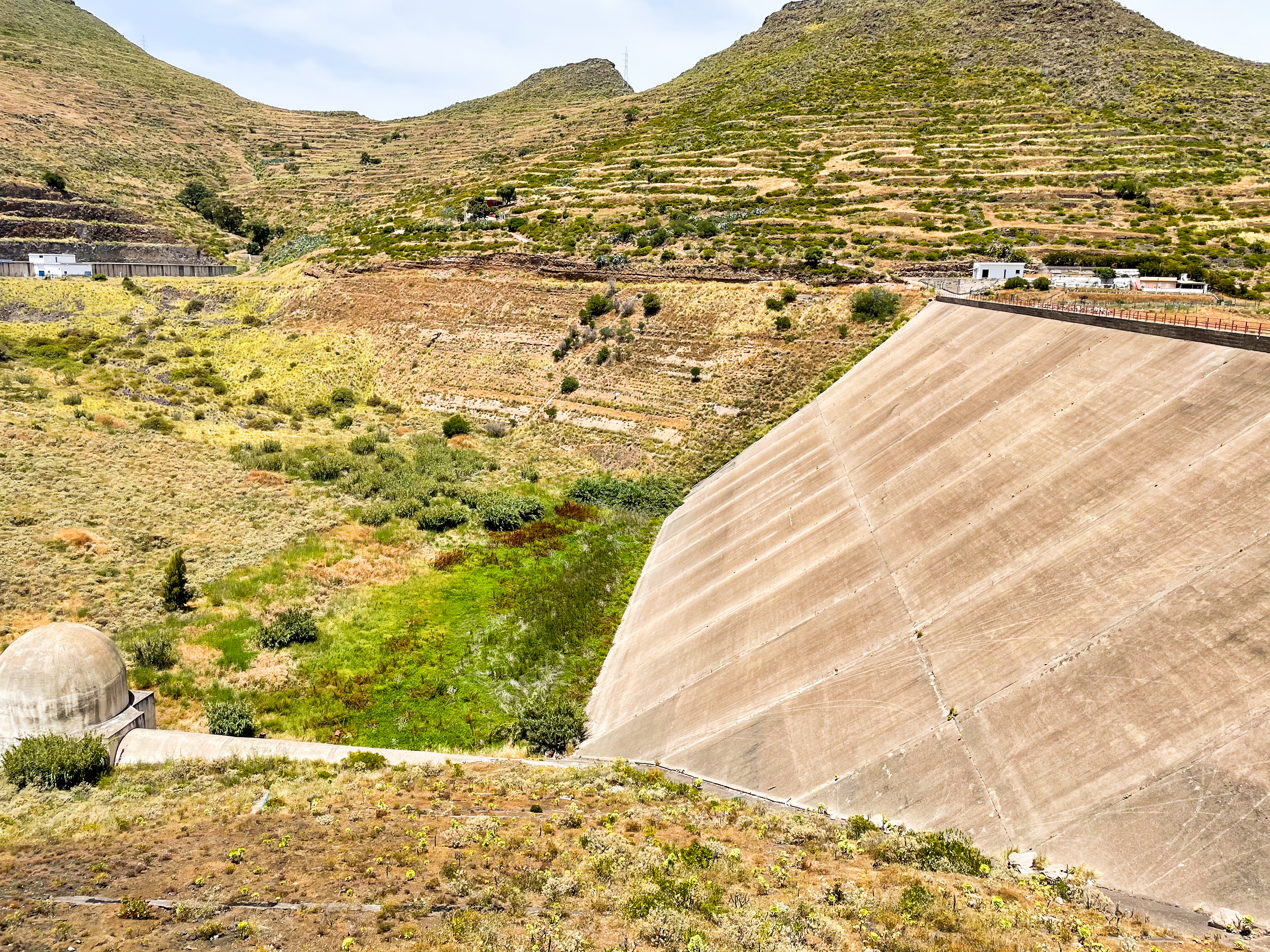

- Location within Canary Islands
- Interactive map of Los Campitos Reservoir
- Official name: Embalse Los Campitos
- Location: Los Campitos, Santa Cruz de Tenerife, Canary Islands
- Coordinates: 28°29′16″N 16°15′46″W
- Construction began: 1969
- Construction cost: 373 million pesetas (dam, 1969–1975); 300 million pesetas (waterproofing, 1978); €5.8 million (remodel, 2002–2004)
- Owner: Ministry of Development

Dam and spillways
- Type of dam: reinforced concrete
- Height: 54 metres (177 ft)

Reservoir
- Surface area: 130,000 square metres (1,400,000 sq ft)

Los Campitos Reservoir (Embalse Los Campitos) is located in the Anchieta ravine, near Los Campitos, above Santa Cruz de Tenerife, in the Canary Islands. The dam was constructed in the 1970s, after which it was discovered that the basin could not hold water. It was subsequently waterproofed in 1978, but has never held water. It was remodeled in the early 2000s, with an enclosed tank and a new pipeline constructed. A study has been conducted to build a hydroelectric plant at the reservoir.

== Construction ==
The dam was constructed in the Anchieta ravine to increase the water supply to Santa Cruz de Tenerife. It was constructed by the Spanish Ministry of Public Works (Ministerio de Obras Públicas), starting in 1969, and cost 373 million pesetas. The dam is 54 metres (177 ft) tall, and is made of reinforced concrete. It encloses a basin with an area of 130,000 square metres (1,400,000 sq ft), which could hold 4.2 million cubic metres of water.

During commissioning in 1975, it was discovered that the basin was permeable and could not hold water. After a meeting in the parliament in Madrid, an urgent repair was authorised, and the basin was waterproofed in May 1978 at a cost of 300 million pesetas. Despite this, the dam has never held water.

== Remodeling ==
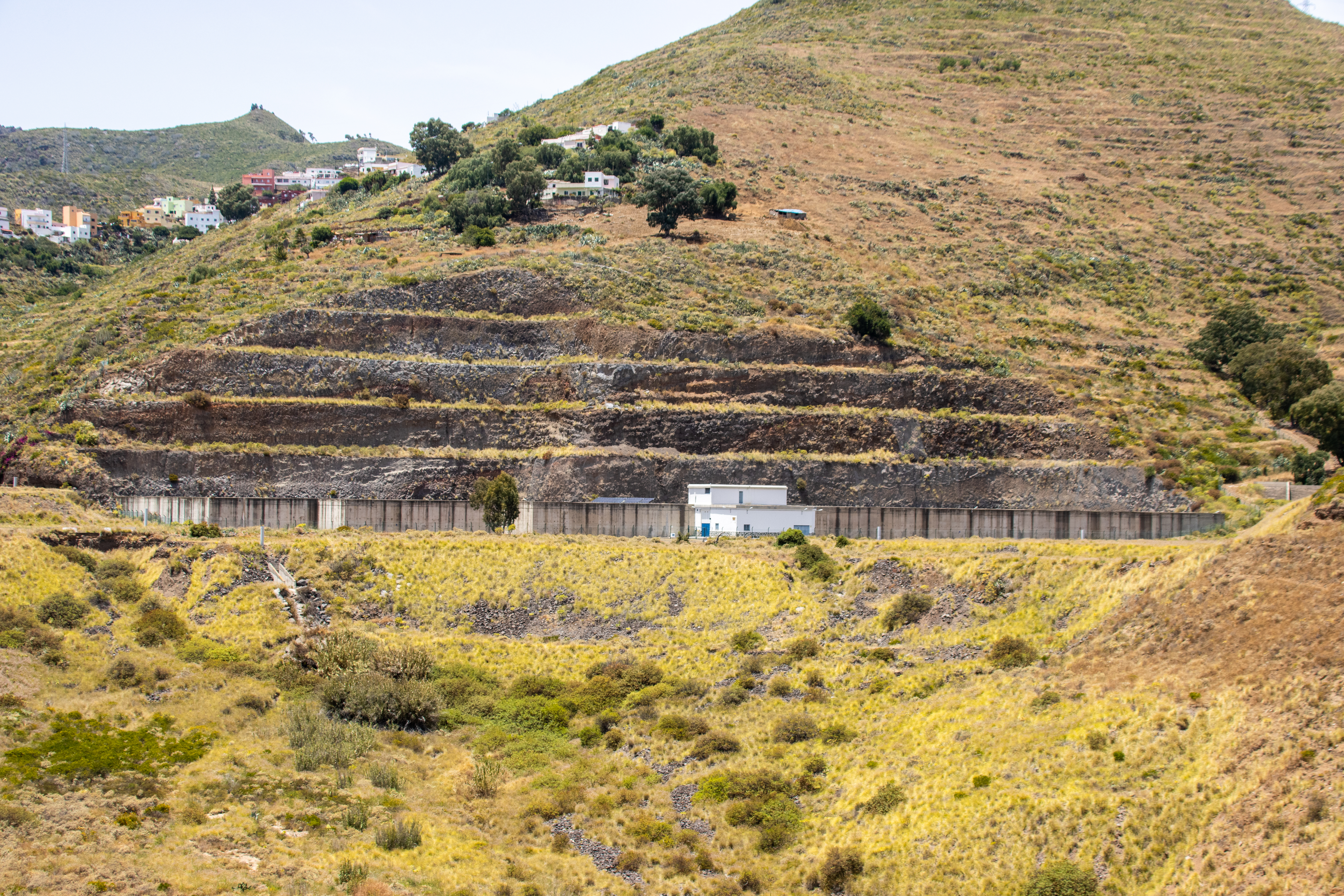
The tank seen from the reservoir dam

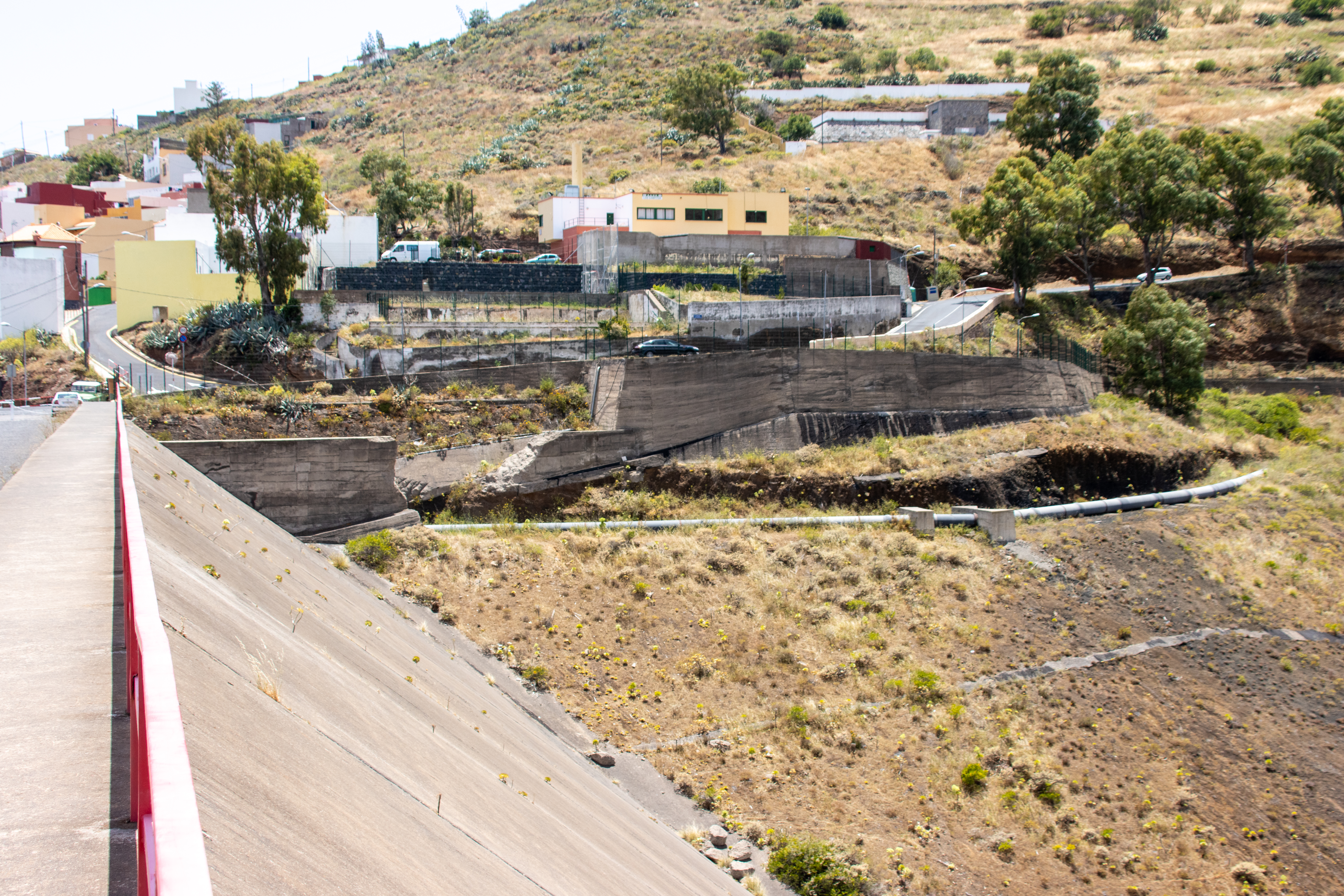
The pipeline can be seen running through the lowered spillover wall

In 2002–04 the reservoir was remodeled at a cost of €5.8 million. A tank with an area of 15,000 square metres (160,000 sq ft) and a height of 5.5 metres (18 ft), capable of holding 77,000 cubic metres of water, was constructed next to the basin. The basin itself was remodeled, to cover a cubic hectometer with the maximum height of water reduced to 20 metres (66 ft). A pressurised pipeline was also constructed from the base of the reservoir to La Laguna, with a length of 4.5 kilometres (2.8 mi) and a diameter of 500 millimetres (20 in), along with a pumping station.

== Hydroelectric plant ==
In 2012, a technical study was made to construct a hydroelectric plant at the reservoir, which was estimated to cost €36.6 million, and was estimated to recover its construction costs after five years of operation.
