= Valverde de Júcar =

Valverde de Júcar, Spain
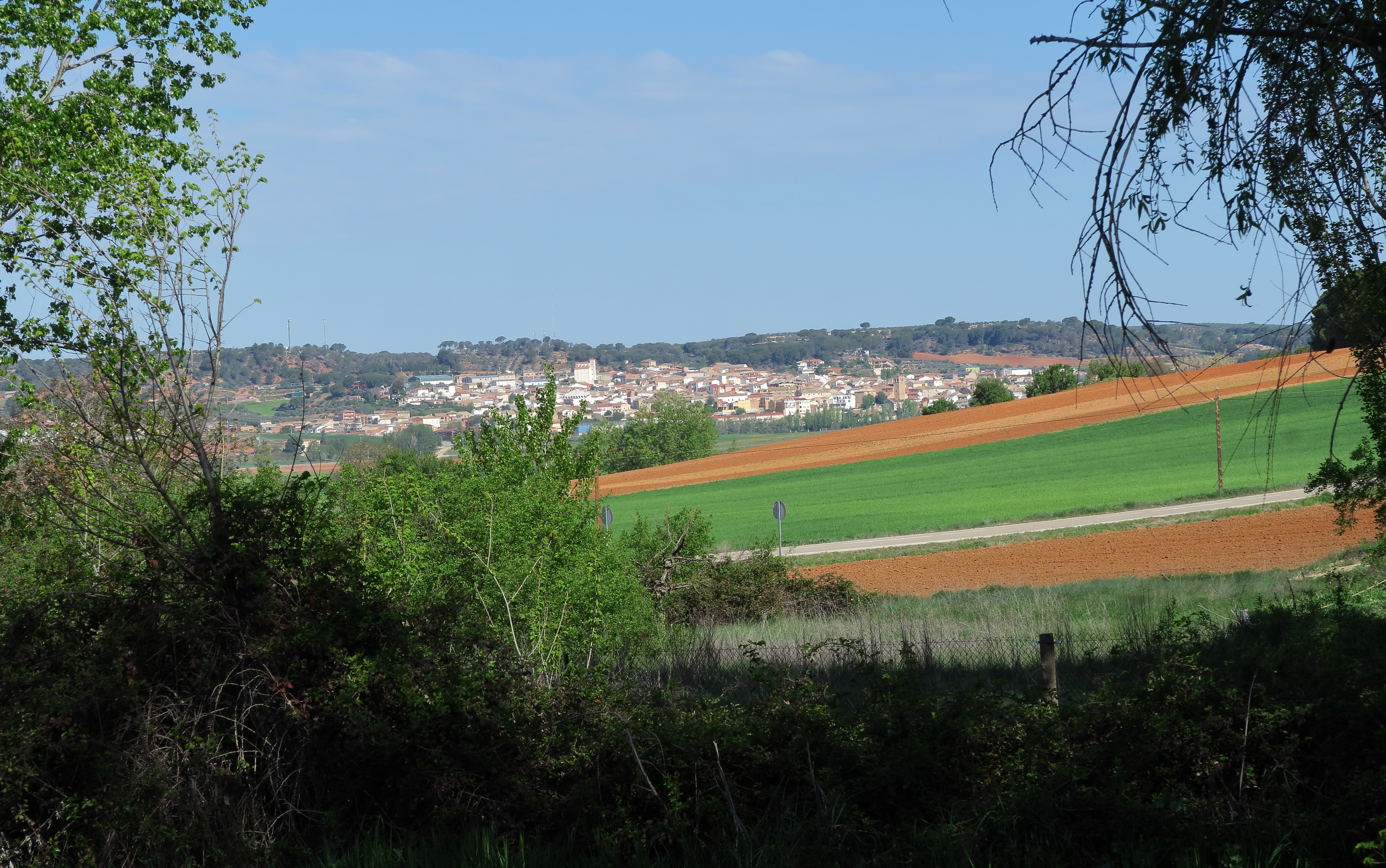
- View of Valverde de Júcar, from Hontecillas

- Flag Coat of arms

- Location within Spain Location within Castilla-La Mancha
- Country: Spain
- Autonomous community: Castile-La Mancha
- Province: Cuenca

Area
  - Total: 56 km^{2} (22 sq mi)

Population (2025-01-01)
  - Total: 1,118
  - Density: 20/km^{2} (52/sq mi)
- Time zone: UTC+1 (CET)
  - Summer (DST): UTC+2 (CEST)

Valverde de Júcar is a municipality located in the province of Cuenca, Castile-La Mancha, Spain. According to the 2016 census (INE), the municipality has a population of 1,173 inhabitants.
