= La Jarosa Reservoir =

- Location within Spain
- Location: Madrid, Spain
- Coordinates: 40°40′09″N 4°07′19″W
- Type: reservoir

The La Jarosa Reservoir is in the Jarosa valley and belongs to the municipality of Guadarrama, and is about 48 kilometres (30 mi) away from Madrid, Spain.

== See also ==
- Reservoirs in the Community of Madrid
