= Tagus-Segura Water Transfer =

System to feed the Talave Reservoir, Spain

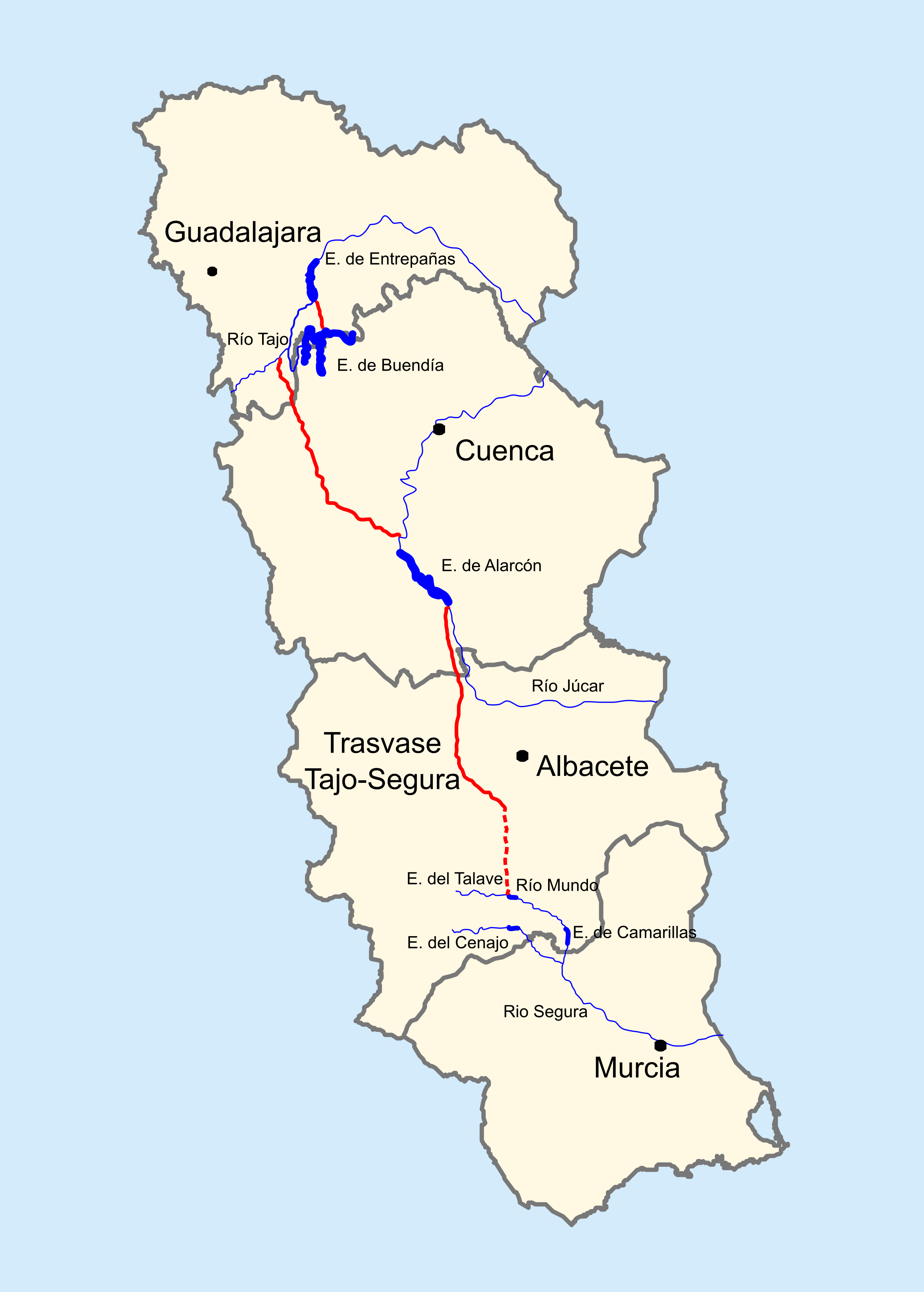
- The transfer system's course.
- Begins: Province of Guadalajara, Spain
- Ends: Province of Albacete
- Official name: Trasvase Tajo-Segura
- Maintained by: Government of Spain

Characteristics
- Total length: 286 km (178 mi)

History
- Construction start: 1969
- Opened: 1979

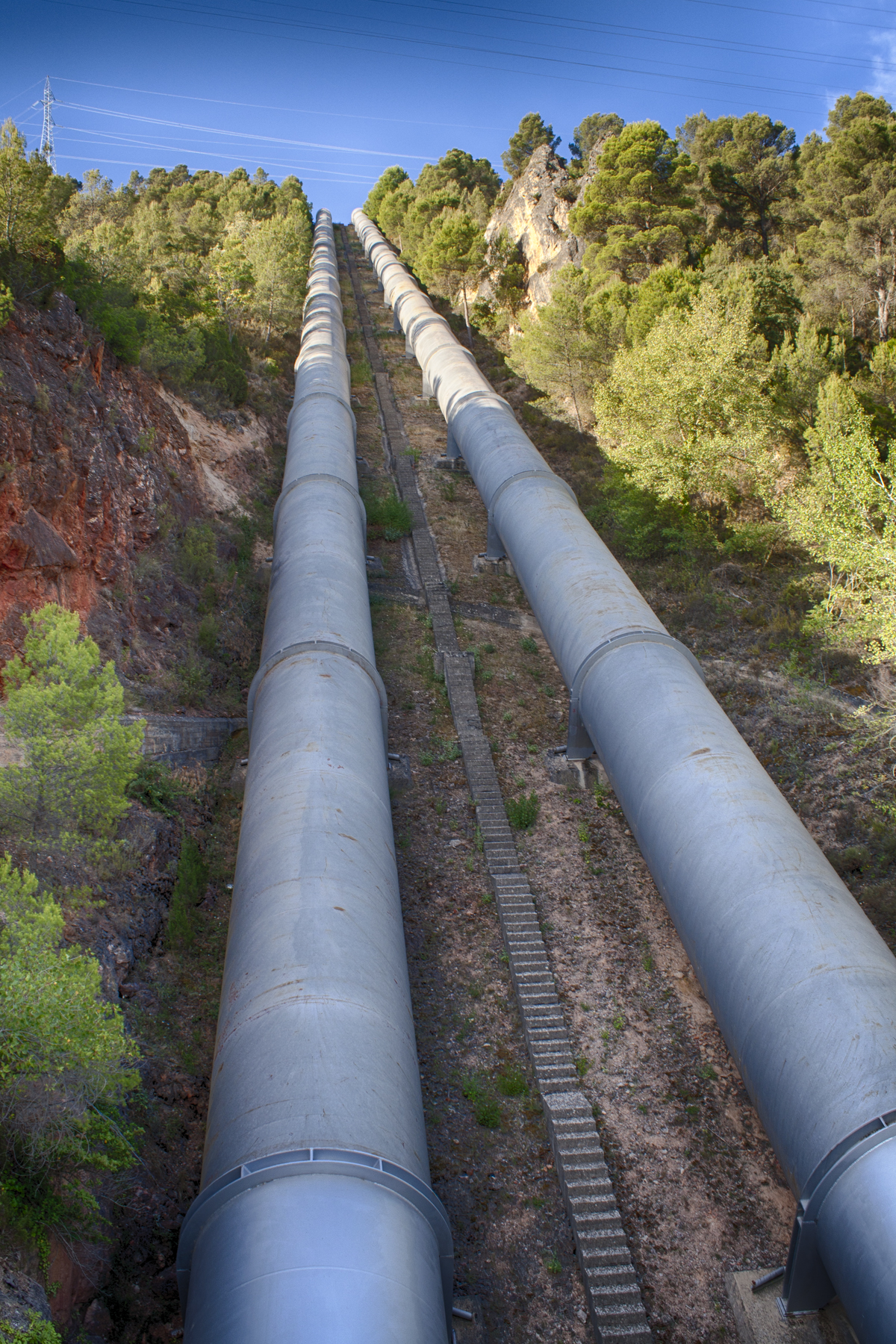
Bolarque Reservoir

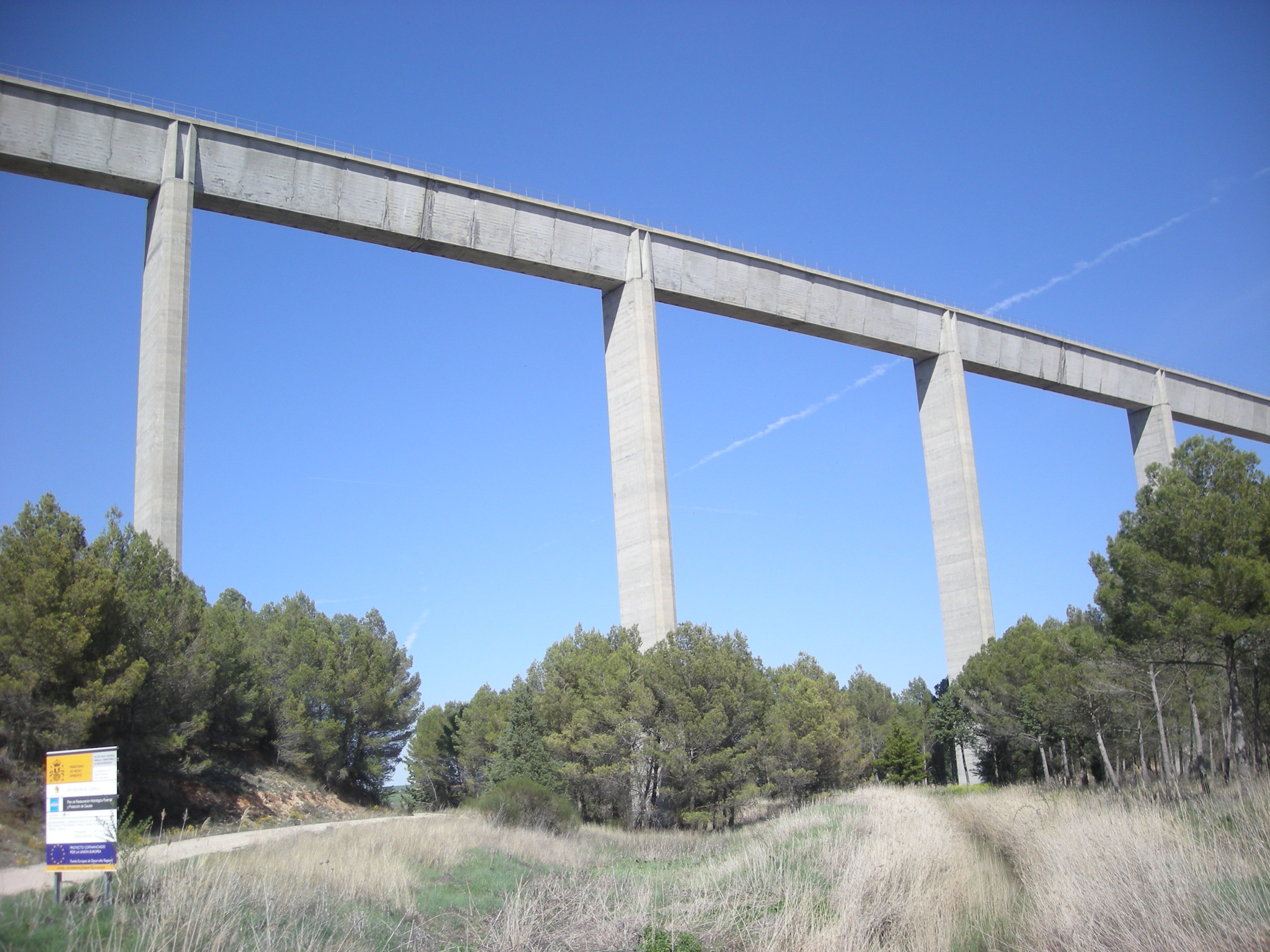
Part of one of the transfer system's aqueducts in its passage through Carrascosa del Campo (Cuenca)

The Tagus-Segura Water Transfer (Spanish: Trasvase Tajo-Segura) is one of the largest works of hydraulic engineering ever developed in Spain. Water from the Tagus River is channeled through this transfer system from the reservoirs of Entrepeñas (Province of Guadalajara) and Buendía (Province of Cuenca) into the Talave Reservoir on the Segura River.

== History ==
Although it was mentioned as early as 1902, the origin of the transfer system dates back to 1932, when the Minister of Public Works Indalecio Prieto entrusted engineer Manuel Lorenzo Pardo with the formulation of a plan for the management of national water resources. A year later, he presented the Plan Nacional de Obras Hidráulicas (National Plan of Hydraulic Works), which included the Tagus-Segura Water Transfer; however, for various reasons, the plan was never realized.

The transfer system project was resumed through the Ministerial Order of July 30, 1966, which commissioned the drafting of the Anteproyecto General del Aprovechamiento Conjunto de los Recursos Hidráulicos del Centro y Sureste de España, Complejo Tajo-Segura (General Proposal for the Joint Management of Hydraulic Resources in Central and Southeastern Spain, Tagus-Segura System). The construction of the Tagus-Segura Water Transfer formed an integral part of this proposal. In 1979, the Segura Basin received the first waters originating from the Tagus River.

== Course ==
The Tagus-Segura Water Transfer links the Bolarque Reservoir on the Tagus River (40°21′41″N 2°49′14″W) with the Talave Reservoir on the Segura (38°31′10″N 1°54′00″W). It is 292 kilometers (181 miles) in length and has a flow rate of 33 cubic meters per second (1,200 cubic feet per second). The transfer's structure comprises four sections:

Section I includes the ascent at Altomira, a key piece in explaining the energy efficiency of the transfer system. It permits water from the Bolarque Reservoir at 636 meters (2,087 feet) to be pumped through two metallic pipes up to the Bujeda Reservoir in the Sierra de Altomira, a 245 m (804 ft) rise in elevation. This task is accomplished by the reversible pumped-storage plant Bolarque II, which relies on four vertical generator assemblies with their corresponding Francis pump-turbines, capable of pumping 66 m^{3}/s (2,300 cu ft/s). The Bolarque-Bujeda system was designed to pump an anticipated 1,000,000,000 m^{3} (810,000 acre-feet) per year.

Section II connects the Bujeda Reservoir to the Alarcón Reservoir on the Júcar River, an intermediate resting place where the transfer's flow can be regulated and compensation can be made in case of system disruption.

Section III joins the Alarcón Reservoir to the Talave Tunnel.

Section IV is for the most part formed by the Talave Tunnel's length of 32 km (20 mi), which runs at varying depths between 150 m (490 ft) and 320 m (1,050 ft). The course then emerges into the Talave Canal, which leads at last to the Talave Reservoir on the Mundo River, a tributary of the Segura.

== Regulation ==
Law 21/2013 introduced major changes to the Tagus-Segura Water Transfer's regulation policy. These changes, while maintaining the source basin's precedence and respecting the specifications of its resource planning, are meant to improve system management by establishing a set of impartial technical standards to eliminate previous insecurities and to provide objective, straightforward criteria for operation.

Water is dispensed into the transfer system on a monthly basis, depending on the total water supply available in the reservoirs of Entrepeñas and Buendía at the beginning of every month. Four levels are used to specify the distribution volume for each transfer, with a maximum annual total of 650,000,000 m^{3} (530,000 acre⋅ft) per water year (600,000,000 (490,000) for the Segura and 50,000,000 (41,000) for the Guadiana).

Level 1. When the total water supply in Entrepeñas and Buendía is equal to or greater than 1,300,000,000 m^{3} (1,100,000 acre⋅ft), or when the total inflow of these reservoirs in the previous twelve months is equal to or greater than 1,200,000,000 m^{3} (970,000 acre⋅ft), the relevant agency shall authorize a transfer of 60,000,000 m^{3} (49,000 acre⋅ft), not exceeding the yearly maximum.

Level 2. When the total water supply in Entrepeñas and Buendía is less than 1,300,000,000 m^{3} (1,100,000 acre⋅ft) without reaching the volumes given in Level 3, and the total inflow recorded in the previous twelve months is less than 1,200,000,000 m^{3} (970,000 acre⋅ft), the relevant agency shall authorize a transfer of 38,000,000 m^{3} (31,000 acre⋅ft), not exceeding the yearly maximum.

Level 3. Assigned when the total water supply in Entrepeñas and Buendía does not exceed, at the beginning of the month, the values shown in the following table:

	Oct.	Nov.	Dec.	Jan.	Feb.	Mar.	Apr.	May	Jun.	Jul.	Aug.	Sep.
m^{3} × 10^{6}	613	609	605	602	597	591	586	645	673	688	661	631
acre-feet	497,000	494,000	490,000	488,000	484,000	479,000	475,000	523,000	546,000	558,000	536,000	512,000

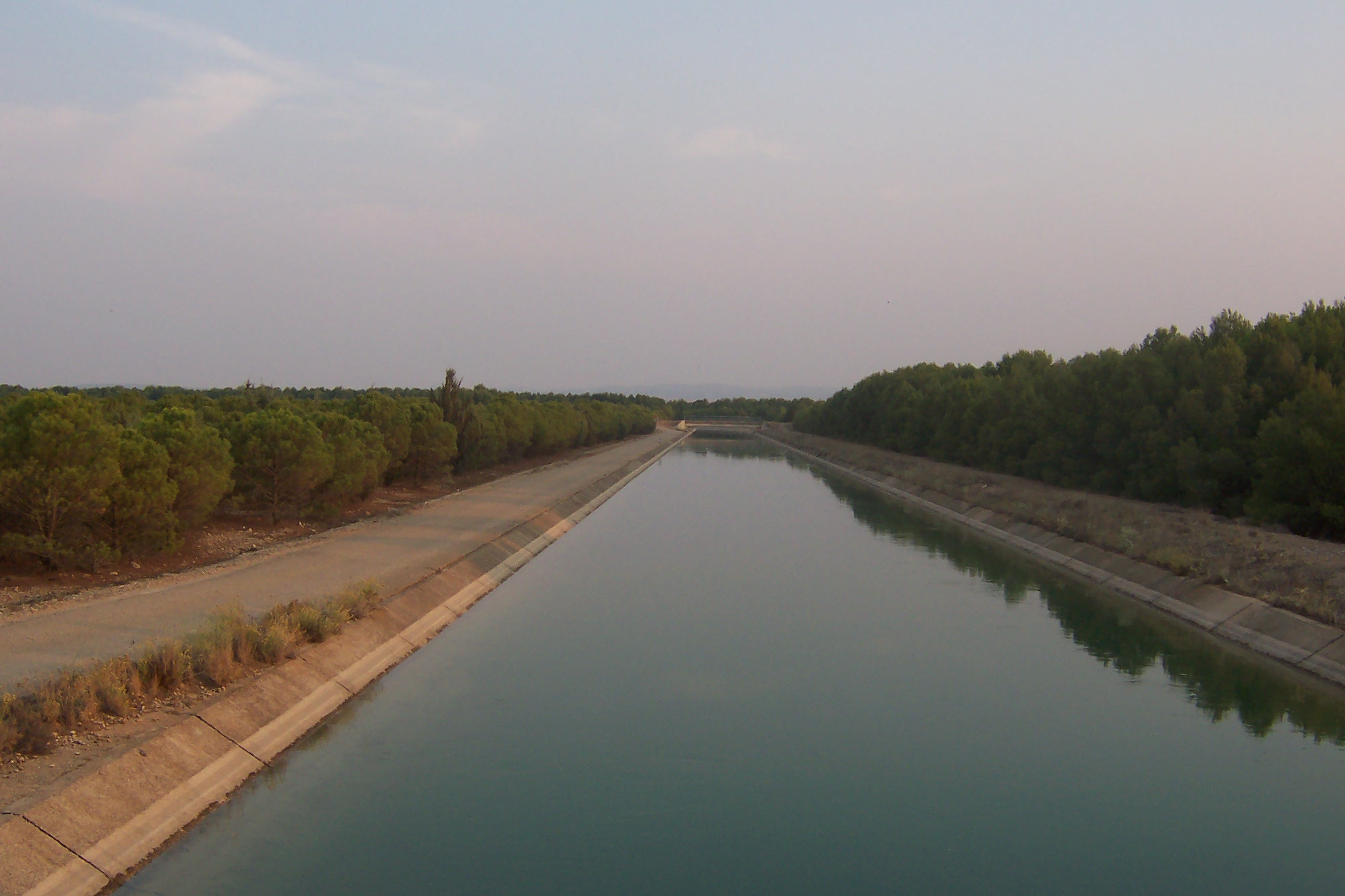
Tagus-Segura Transfer in its passage through Albacete

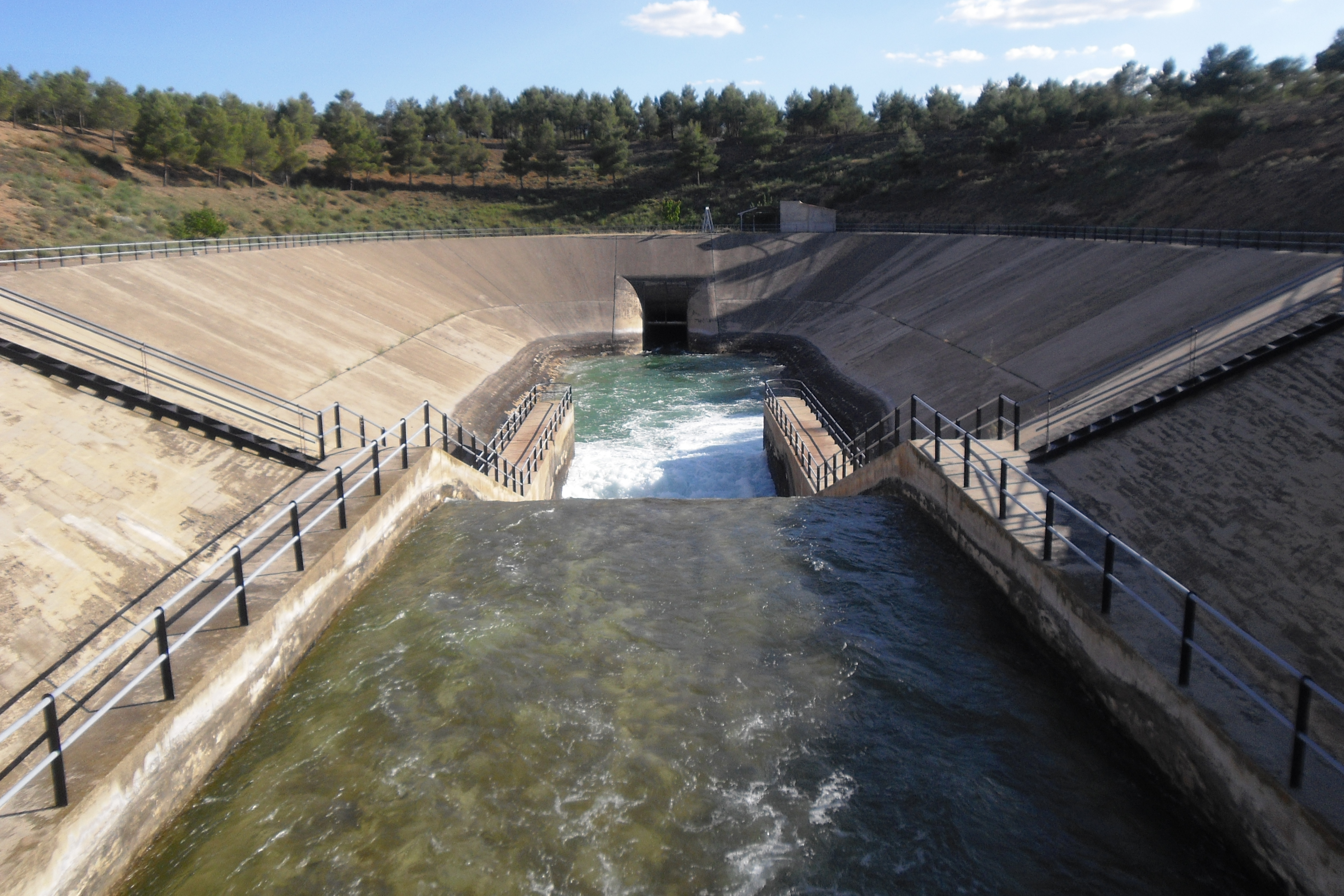
Los Anguijes Dam

At this level, which constitutes an irregular hydrological situation, the relevant agency shall authorize at its discretion and with valid justification a transfer of up to 20,000,000 m^{3} (16,000 acre⋅ft).

Level 4. When the total water supply in Entrepeñas and Buendía is less than 400,000,000 m^{3} (320,000 acre⋅ft), no transfer is permitted. In order for the reservoir supply to reach this new minimum figure from the one previously fixed at 240,000,000 m^{3} (190,000 acre⋅ft), a five-year transitional program will be implemented.

To promote the development of riverside communities, priority will be given to the headwater reservoirs for the holding of authorized transfers pending distribution, before the intermediate and terminal basins, as long as this practice conforms to a reasonable and cohesive use of the whole system.

Except in duly confirmed cases of catastrophe or extreme need that disrupt the transfer of water, if the approved volumes outlined in Levels 1 and 2 have not been transferred within the authorized time period, they may still be sent within the three months following the deadline, unless a level change occurs.

Resources authorized for transfer may be used throughout the water year. If any transferred water remains in the receiving basin after the end of the water year, it will be redistributed as an available resource for use in the transfer system during the following water year.

Authorized transfers will be divided between water supply and irrigation, in a 25% to 75% proportion respectively, always assuring at least 7,500,000 m^{3} (6,100 acre⋅ft) per month for urban water supply.

The Central Commission for Exploitation of the Tajo-Segura will be responsible for authorizing transfers when the conditions for Levels 1 and 2 are met, while the ministry with authority concerning water resources, having received the commission's report, will authorize transfers at Level 3.

In regard to Levels 1 and 2, transfer authorization should be granted over six-month terms, while three-month terms are preferred for Level 3 unless the relevant agency should justify the use of different intervals at any level.

== Post-transfer system ==
The Talave Reservoir marks the beginning of the post-transfer system. This is a complex of structures enabling the regulation, transport, and final distribution of water to the various recipient zones. Its principal component is the Ojós Diversion Dam, from which proceed the following: the Blanca elevation, the main canal of the right riverbank, and the Almería Canal; the main canal of the left riverbank and the Crevillente Canal; and La Pedrera Reservoir and the Campo de Cartagena Canal.

The volume of water assigned for agricultural irrigation from the Tagus-Segura Water Transfer is 400,000,000 m^{3} (320,000 acre⋅ft), approximately 53% for new irrigation plots and the rest for replenishing previously irrigated land. According to mid-2009 concession proceedings, the irrigable zones of the post-transfer system comprise a nominal surface area of 132,724 hectares (327,970 acres), of which 82,257 ha (203,260 acres), or 62%, are located in the Region of Murcia.

The average yearly water volume transferred into the Segura Basin from 1979-2014 was 328,000,000 m^{3} (266,000 acre⋅ft) per year (55% of the allowed maximum). Volumes transferred for public use have not varied greatly over time, unlike irrigation transfers, whose average yearly sum was 204,000,000 m^{3} (165,000 acre⋅ft), almost half of the allocated quantity.

According to estimations made by PwC in 2013, the food and agriculture industry linked with the Tagus-Segura Water Transfer brings in a GDP of €2.3 million and more than 100,000 jobs, if commercialization and processing activities are included. Despite these figures, the Tagus-Segura Water Transfer has always been the subject of heated debate, having been used from the beginning as a means to criticize the previous Francoist government, under whose authority construction of the transfer began. However, the transfer cannot be considered the work of any one political regime: it was planned during the Second Spanish Republic, built under Franco's dictatorship, and put into service during the Spanish transition to democracy. It still receives much criticism today, mainly for territorial and environmental reasons. With respect to this controversy, Melgarejo et al. observe: "Thirty years after the commission of the Tagus-Segura Aqueduct, it's hard to understand why its use still hasn't been normalized, and why the distribution of water is still in question."

The official launching of the Tagus-Segura Water Transfer made intensive farming possible in the Spanish southeast, consequently placing the region among the largest European outdoor producers of out-of-season crops. For this reason, it is widely known as the "vegetable garden of Europe."

== See also ==
- Aqueduct (water supply)
- Hydroelectricity
- Water supply and sanitation in Spain
- List of tunnels in Spain
