= Belmontejo =

Municipality of Spain

- Municipality
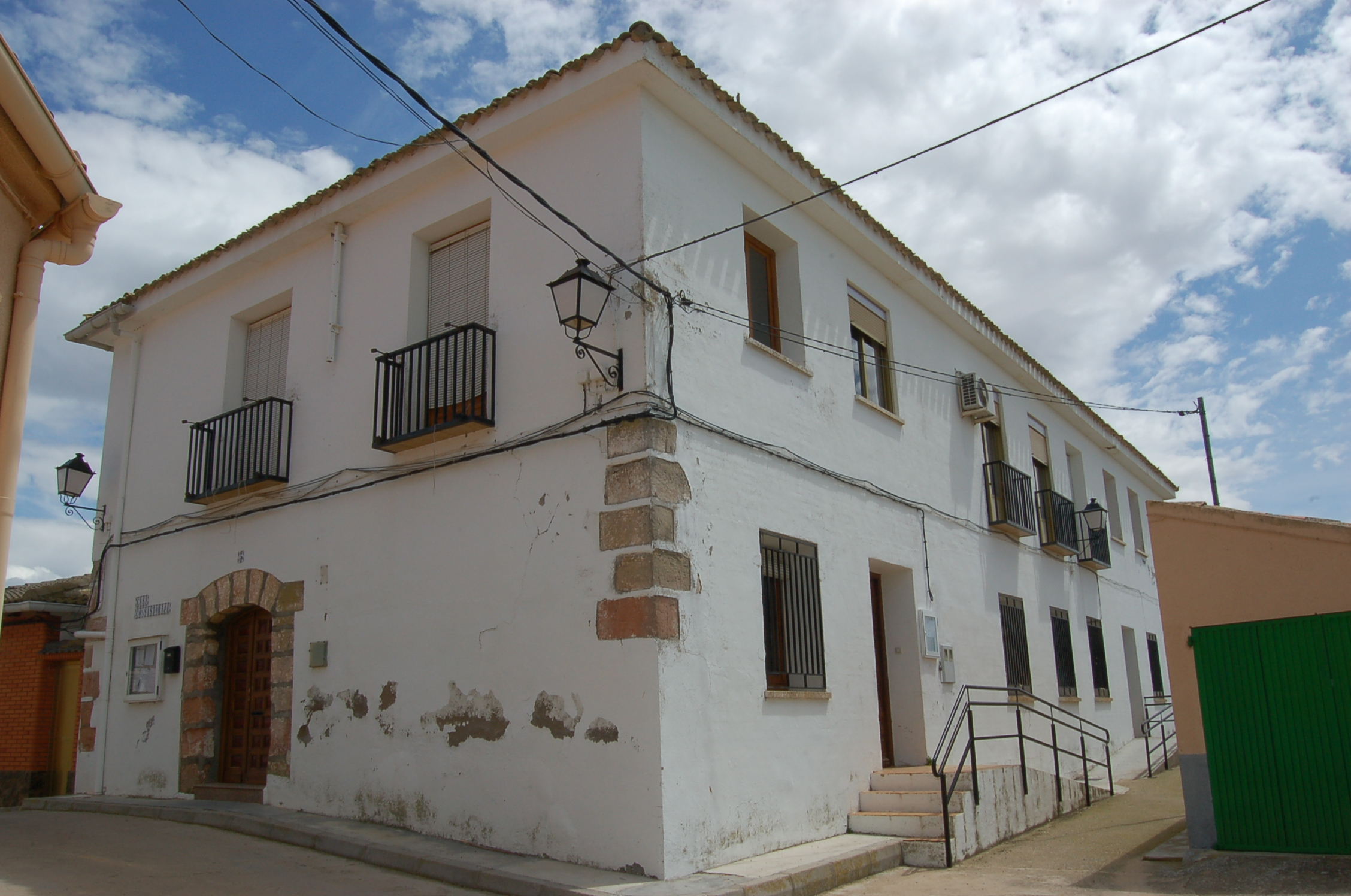
- Town hall

- Location within Spain Location within Castilla-La Mancha
- Coordinates: 39°49′N 2°20′W
- Country: Spain
- Autonomous community: Castile-La Mancha
- Province: Cuenca

Population (2025-01-01)
  - Total: 122
- Time zone: UTC+1 (CET)
  - Summer (DST): UTC+2 (CEST)

Belmontejo is a municipality in Cuenca, Castile-La Mancha, Spain. It had a population of 250 as at 2014/15.
