= Torrubia del Castillo =

Torrubia del Castillo, Spain
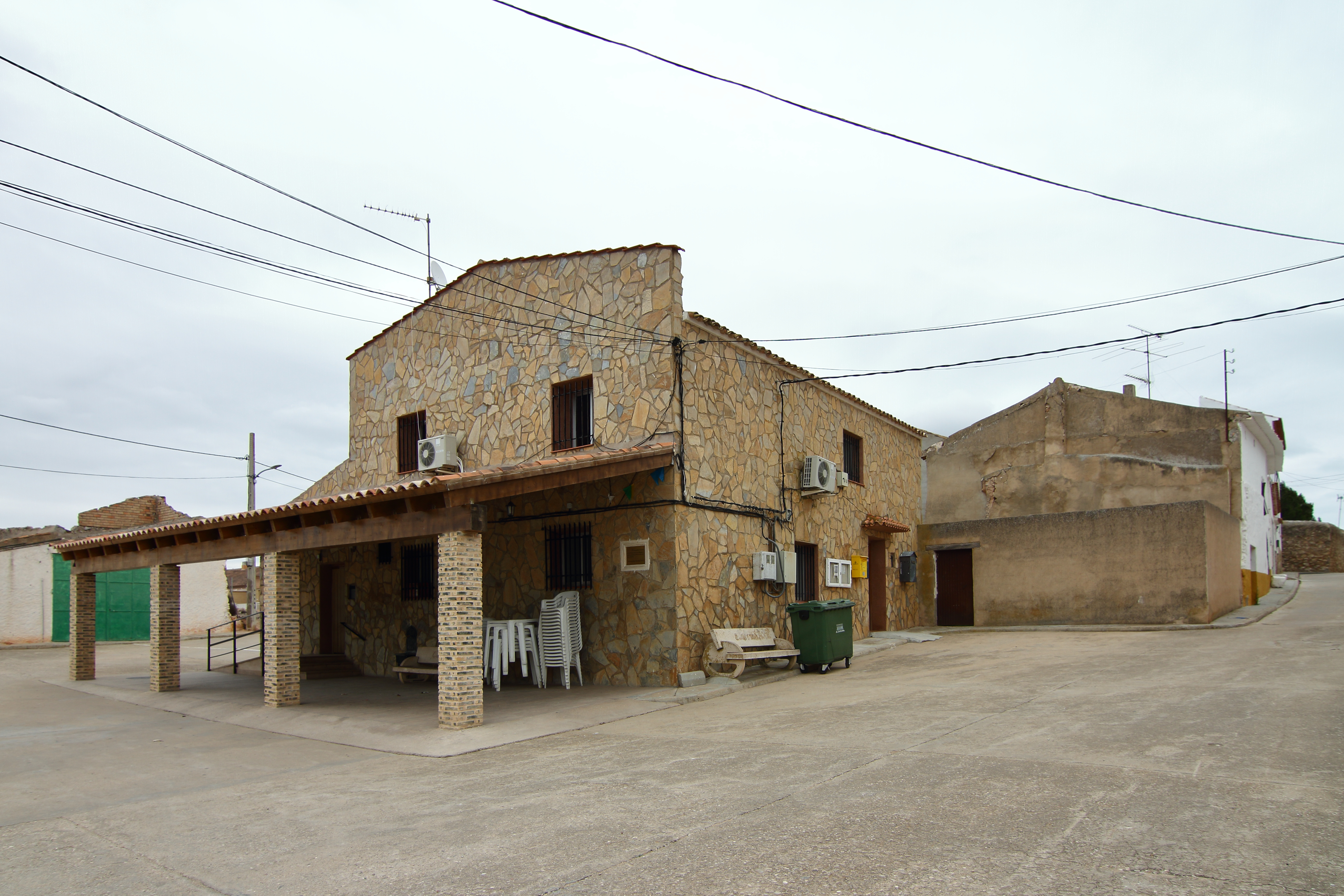
- The Local Council, Torrubia del Castillo

- Location within Spain Location within Castilla-La Mancha
- Coordinates: 39°39′N 2°18′W
- Country: Spain
- Autonomous community: Castile-La Mancha
- Province: Cuenca
- Municipality: Torrubia del Castillo

Area
  - Total: 17 km^{2} (6.6 sq mi)

Population (2025-01-01)
  - Total: 42
  - Density: 2.5/km^{2} (6.4/sq mi)
- Time zone: UTC+1 (CET)
  - Summer (DST): UTC+2 (CEST)

Torrubia del Castillo is a municipality located in the province of Cuenca, Castile-La Mancha, Spain. According to the 2004 census (INE), the municipality has a population of 38 inhabitants.
