= Pareja =

Pareja, Spain
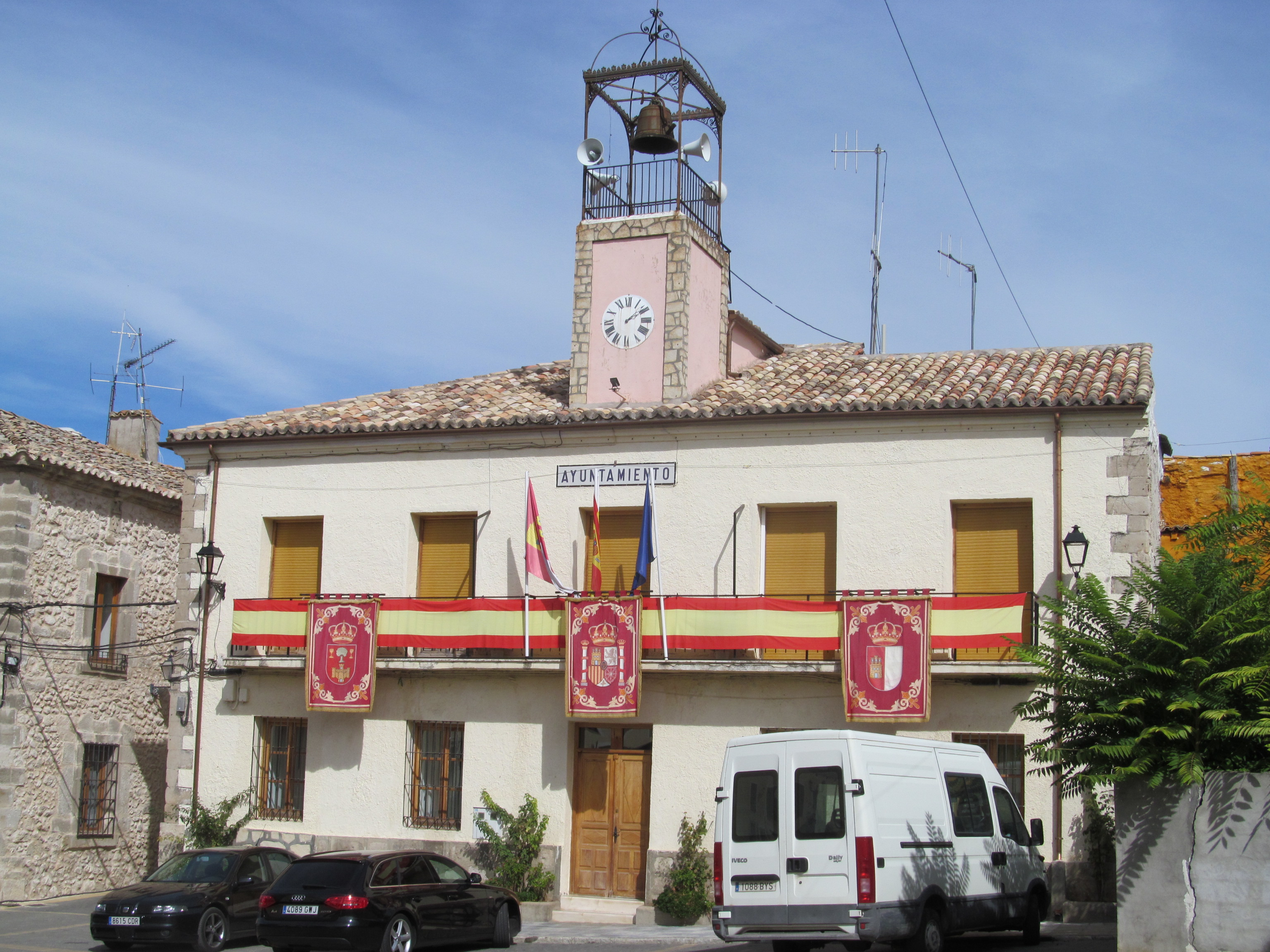
- Town hall

- Coat of arms

- Location within Province of Guadalajara Location within Castilla-La Mancha Location within Spain
- Country: Spain
- Autonomous community: Castile-La Mancha
- Province: Guadalajara
- Municipality: Pareja

Area
  - Total: 91 km^{2} (35 sq mi)

Population (2025-01-01)
  - Total: 493
  - Density: 5.4/km^{2} (14/sq mi)
- Time zone: UTC+1 (CET)
  - Summer (DST): UTC+2 (CEST)

Pareja is a municipality located in the province of Guadalajara, Castile-La Mancha, Spain. According to the 2004 census (INE), the municipality has a population of 502 inhabitants.

== Language ==
In Pareja, they speak Spanish. 'Pareja' in Spanish means 'Couple'.
