= Carrascosa =

== People ==
- Jorge Carrascosa, Argentine former footballer

== Places ==
- Carrascosa, Cuenca, a municipality in the province of Cuenca, Castile-La Mancha
- Carrascosa de Abajo, a municipality in the province of Soria, Castilla y León
- Carrascosa de Haro, a municipality in the province of Cuenca, Castilla-La Mancha
- Carrascosa de la Sierra, a municipality in the province of Soria, Castilla y León
- Carrascosa del Campo, a town in the municipality of Campos del Paraíso, province of Cuenca, Castilla-La Mancha
- Sierra Carrascosa, in Aragon
