= Council of Aranda =

The Council of Aranda was a provincial council convened by the Archbishop of Toledo Alfonso Carrillo de Acuña in the Kingdom of Castile, under the orders of Henry IV of Castile, and held in 1473 in the Castilian town of Aranda de Duero (today in the Province of Burgos, Spain). It was held in the Church of San Juan and focused on tackling depravity within the clergy. One of the canons of the Council ordered that those who did not speak Latin should not be ordained, while others dealt with clerical concubinage, clandestine marriages and so on. The Instituto Castellano y Leonés de la Lengua has published the original Latin text of the council and a translation into Spanish.

The preparatory sessions took place in the San Pedro monastery in the nearby town of Gumiel de Izán, which was part of the Count of Castro's estate. The session opened with a speech by Archbishop Carrillo, in which he expressed his concern for his people.

In 2006 and 2007, a theatrical re-enactment of the council, written by Miguel Gómez Andrea and directed by Miguel Nieto, was performed by amateur actors. This led to the work Aranda, 1473, written by Carlos Contreras Elvira and Félix Estaire, and directed by Ana and Andrés García, which premiered at the Cultural Centre in Aranda de Duero on 25 October 2013 to great public acclaim. It was re-run in 2014 and 2015. In 2016, the same writers penned a new version of the play, called Aranda, 1473. Paseable, which moved the setting to the town streets, matching the plot to the real historical locations in which the events take place.
