= Valparaíso de Arriba =

Human settlement in Castile-La Mancha, Spain

Coordinates: 40.0673°N 2.6158°W

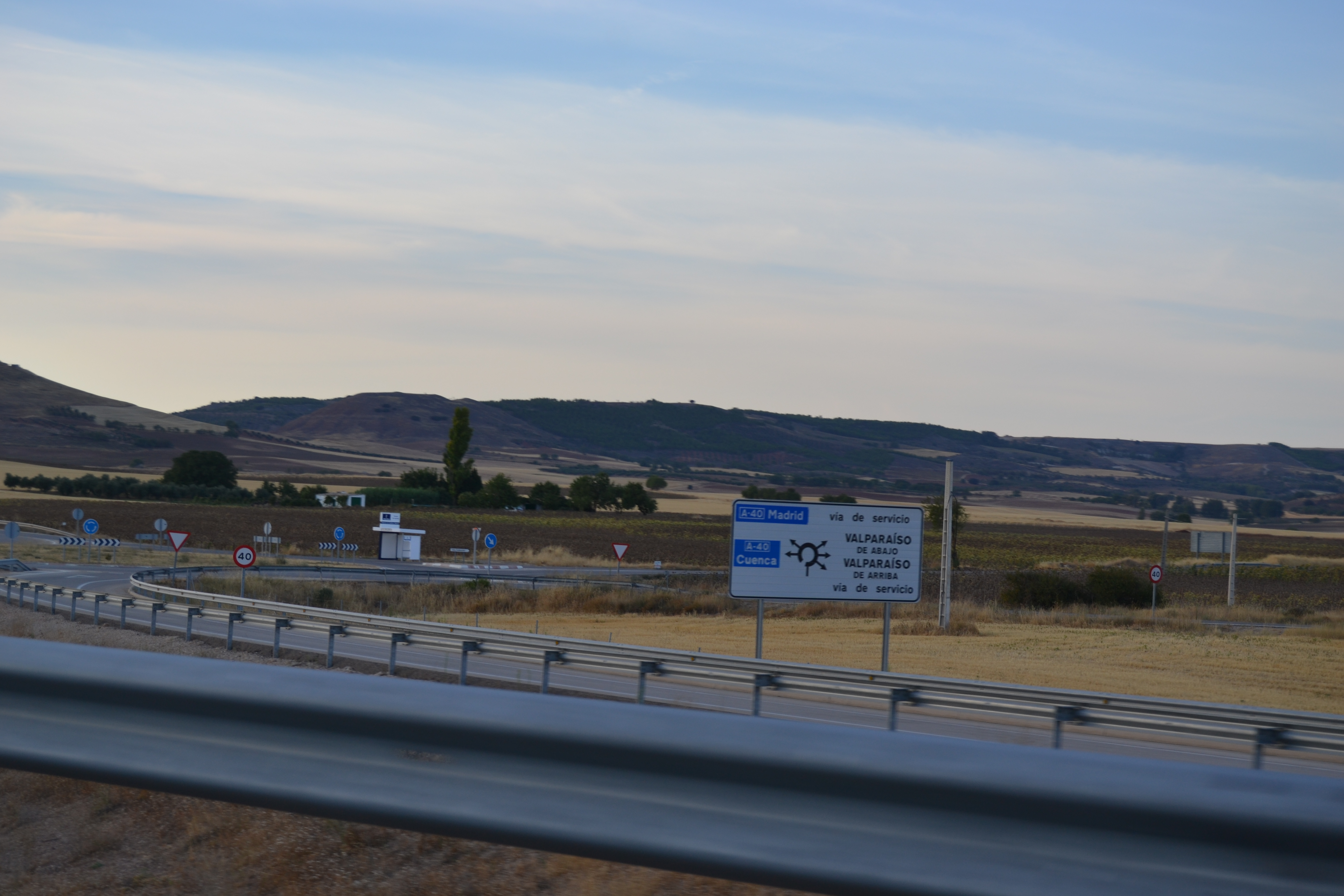

Valparaíso de Arriba is a town in the municipality of Campos del Paraíso (Paradise Fields), with a population of 47. It is located in the area called Mancha Alta y Sierra Media, in Cuenca Province, part of the community of Castilla-La Mancha in Spain.

The town is the birthplace of Juan de Saavedra, founder of Valparaíso in Chile. De Saavedra's remains are buried in the Santa Ana Chapel, inside the Church of Saint Michael the Archangel.
