= Alonso Carrillo's Mass of St Gregory =

1480 painting by Alfonso Carillo de Acuña

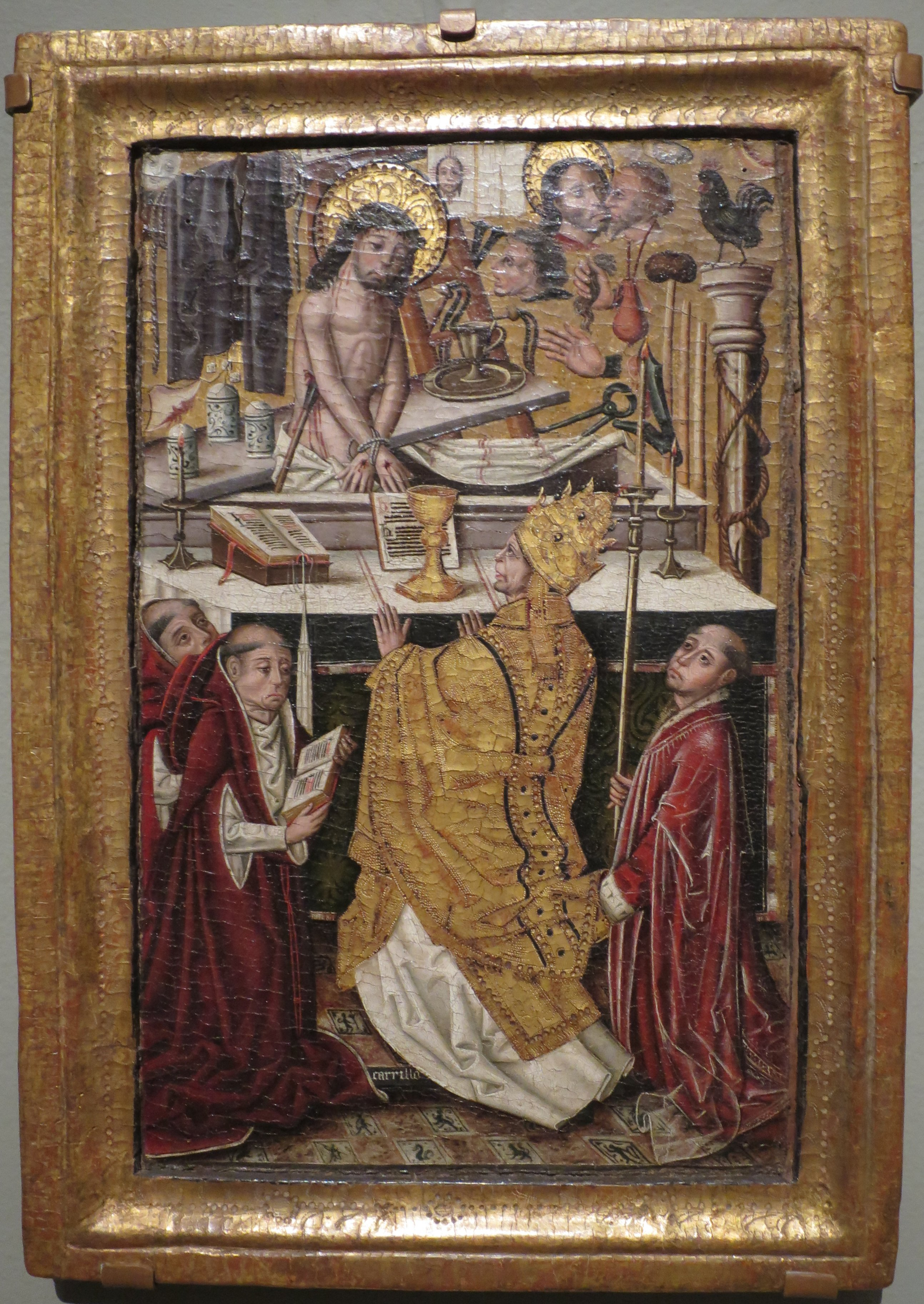
Alfonso Carrillo, Spanish, 15th Century

The Mass of Saint Gregory is a scene in Roman Catholic art which can be seen illustrated many times throughout the late Middle Ages. This version was painted in oil and gold (possibly tempura) by Spanish Archbishop Alfonso Carrillo de Acuña in 1480. It currently resides in the San Francisco Legion of Honor.

== Historical background ==
Pope Gregory I was Pope of Rome in the 6th century, and was most known for Gregorian Chant. He is commonly credited with founding the medieval papacy and so many attribute the beginning of medieval spirituality to him. In the scene, Gregory I is seen saying mass at an altar. The story behind the scene goes that to convince a doubter who did not believe that transubstantiation made bread into the body of Christ, Pope Gregory prays to God and the host turned into a bloody finger. In the popular 13th century compilation the Golden Legend this story is retained, but other versions vary and the finger is changed into a visionary appearance of the whole of Christ on the altar, and the doubter becomes one of the deacons. In this painting, Jesus as a whole appears on the altar, solidifying the concept of transubstantiation even more. This image has strong association with the idea of the sale of indulgences, and at times, this image was even coupled with specific indulgences that were granted to those who said prayers in its presence. In this painting Jesus is emerging from his tomb, but other times it is just his body.

== Artwork ==
The use of gold can be noted throughout the painting, its holy appeal is used as a halo around Jesus, on the robes and crown of the pope, and on the chalice upon the altar. It is believed that this leaves reference to the divine connection between God and the papacy, as well as to the divine transformation that takes place in the chalice during transubstantiation. The Pope and the two cardinals are placed in the foreground, looking up at Jesus above them, and images of his betrayal and crucifixion in the background.

The painting is full of “Arma Christi”. The image above Jesus, wherein he is kissing another man, represents the betrayal of Judas upon Jesus’ arrest. The black rooster represents how the disciple Peter would deny association with Jesus “three times before the cock crows”, after Jesus’ arrest. The red coin purse represents the pieces of silver that Judas accepted in return for his betrayal of Jesus. The whip and the white pillar with the rope around it represents the 40 lashings Christ received by the Romans at the Scourging at the Pillar. Besides all of these smaller symbols in the background, Jesus himself is a symbol for the effect of transubstantiation. In the top section, a face can be seen on a hanging cloth, this could be a reference to one of the Acheiropoieta images like the Shroud of Turin.

== Patronage ==
Alfonso Carrillo de Acuña was a Spanish politician and Roman Catholic archbishop. He descended from a noble Portuguese family, meaning that he was in the aristocratic class and chose to enter the clergy. He was educated by his uncle who was a Cardinal, and later became an influential figure in the royal court of John II of Castile.

While the patronage for this painting is not given, it can be inferred that the artwork produced by Archbishop Alfonso Carrillo was supported by the Catholic Church, especially art like this which supported papal authority. It could also be inferred that Alfonso received patronage from John II of Castile, Henry IV and Isabella I.

In his lifetime, Carrillo served under six Popes throughout his life, from Pope Eugene IV to Pope Sixtus IV. This span includes the papacy of Callixtus III, who was the first Spanish Pope. Carrillo was made protonotary apostolic by Pope Eugene IV, entering the royal court of John II of Castile. He was a hugely influential figure in the court of John II, Henry IV and with the Catholic Monarchs. He was made bishop of Sigüenza in 1436 then archbishop of Toledo in 1446. Carrillo acted as Queen Isabella’s main advisor and he played a major part in arranging her marriage to Ferdinand II of Aragon in October 1469. Carrillo was alive during the reign of Emperor Frederick III of the Holy Roman Empire, but no interaction is mentioned.
