= Alfonso Carrillo de Acuña =

Spanish politician and Roman Catholic archbishop

His Excellency Alfonso Carrillo de Acuña
- Archbishop of Toledo; Primate of Spain
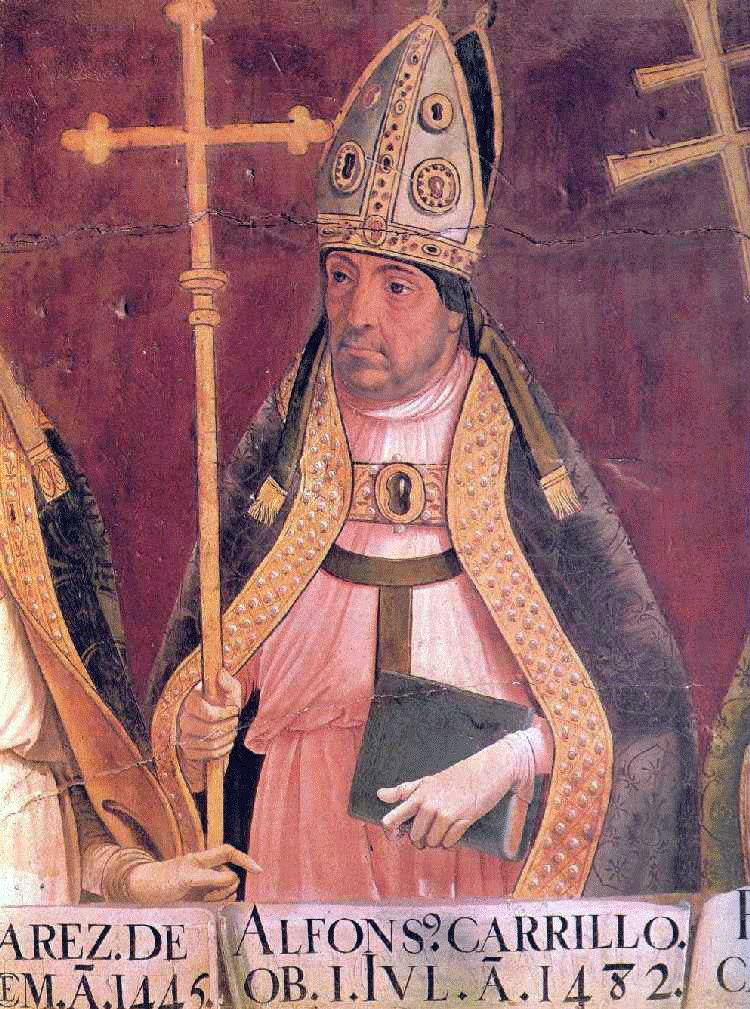
- Mural painting of Archbishop Carrillo, by Juan de Borgoña, Chapter House of the Cathedral of Toledo, 1508
- Church: Catholic Church
- Diocese: Toledo
- Appointed: 10 August 1446
- Term ended: 1 July 1482
- Predecessor: Gutierre Alvarez de Toledo
- Successor: Pedro González de Mendoza

Personal details
- Born: 11 August 1413 Carrascosa del Campo, Spain
- Died: 1 July 1482 (aged 68) Alcalá de Henares, Spain
- Coat of arms

Alfonso Carrillo de Acuña (11 August 1413 in Carrascosa del Campo – 1 July 1482 in Alcalá de Henares) was a Spanish politician and Roman Catholic archbishop.

== Life ==
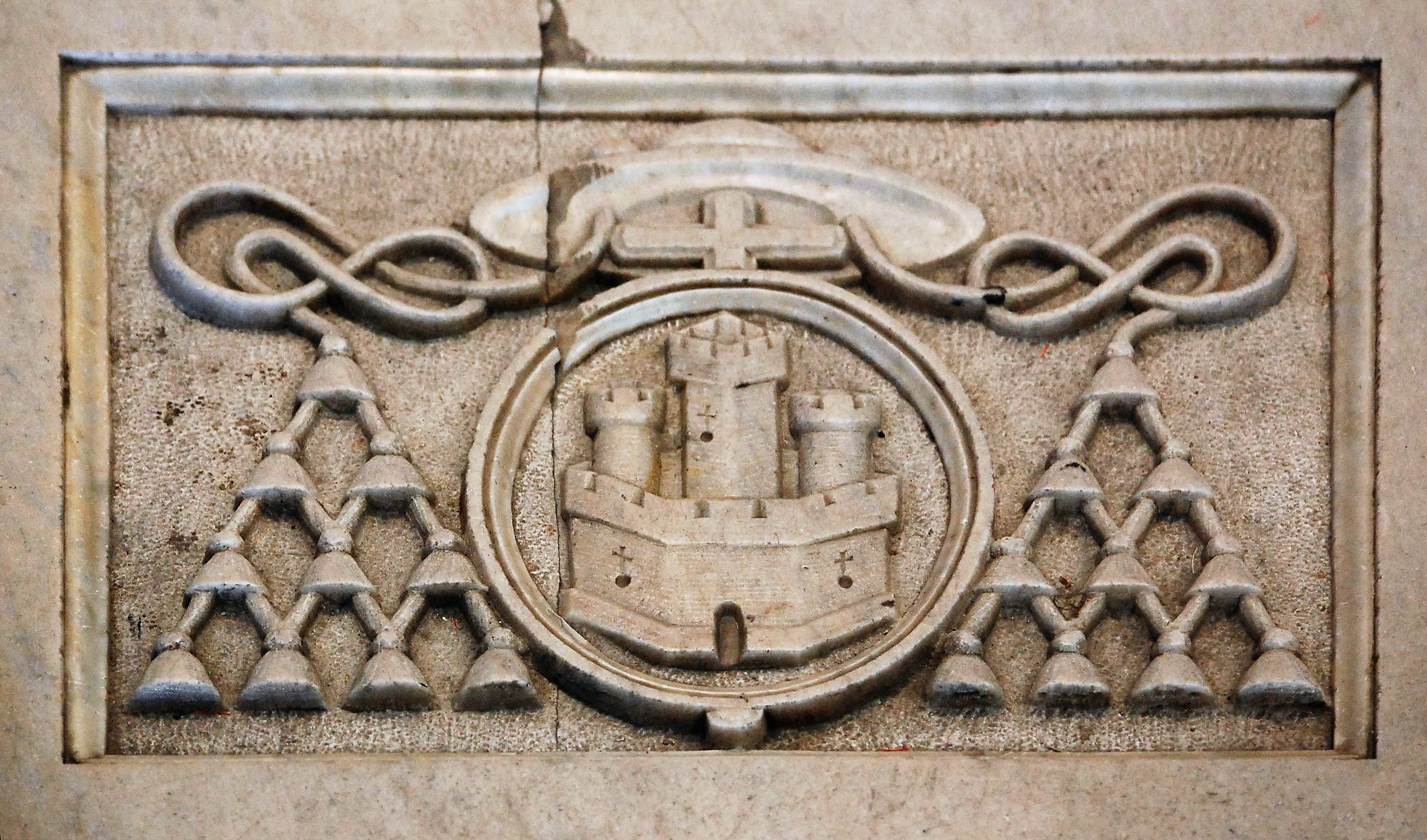
Coat of Alfonso Carrillo de Acuña at his grave in the Alcalá de Henares Cathedral.

His father was Lope Vázquez de Acuña, head of the Honrado Concejo de la Mesta and descendant of a noble Portuguese family. His mother was Teresa Carrillo de Albornoz, a native of Carrascosa del Campo whose ancestors had included clergy. He was educated under his uncle, cardinal Alfonso Carrillo de Albornoz. On Albornoz's fall from power, in 1434, Carrillo was made protonotary apostolic by Pope Eugene IV, entering the royal court of John II of Castile. He was a hugely influential figure in the court of John II (1406–1454), Henry IV (1454–1474) and with the Catholic Monarchs. On the execution of the royal favourite Alvaro de Luna in 1453, Carrillo raised Juan Pacheco, marquis de Villena, the favourite of the new king Henry IV and diplomat to France for him, rising to great power and overcoming many nobles. His greed and ambition led him to oppose the king when Henry IV promoted Beltrán de la Cueva and his Mendoza allies, sworn enemies of Carrillo, as advisors to the throne instead of his nephew, Juan Pacheco.

He was made bishop of Sigüenza in 1436 then archbishop of Toledo in 1446. He was made a pseudocardinal deacon of Sant'Eustachio in the consistory of 12 April 1440, but declined the promotion From 1462 Carrillo was the main instigator of the noble Castilian faction which wanted to depose the king and replace him with his half-brother, the infante Alfonso, and he was a highly active participant in the Farce of Ávila. This began a long and bloody civil war in Castile.

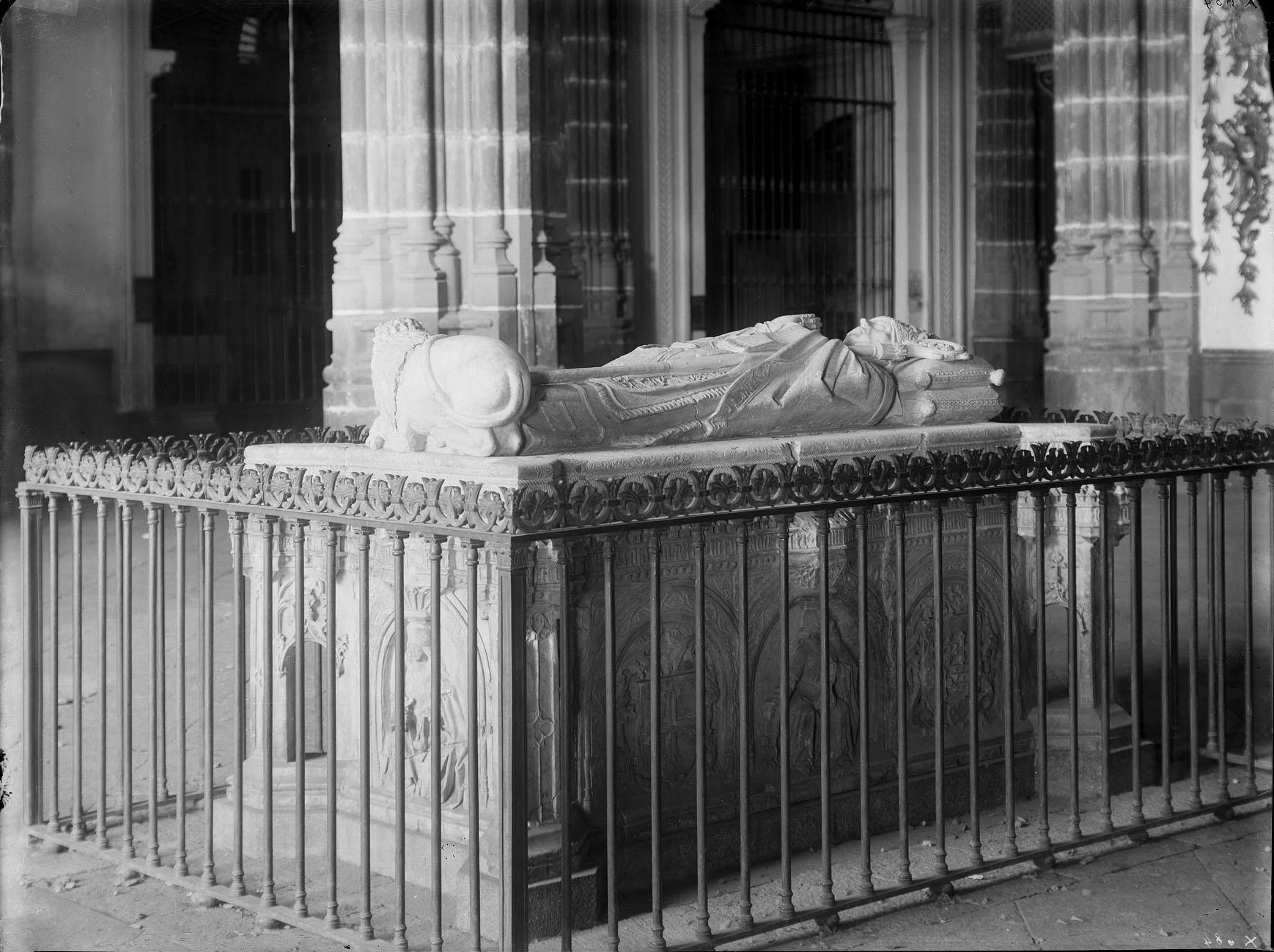
Sepulcher of Archbishop Carrillo (Jean Laurent ca. 1870) in Alcalá de Henares.

The infante died in summer 1468 and was replaced as pretender to the throne by his sister Isabella. Carrillo acted as her main advisor and with Pedro de Peralta (Pedro de Peralta y Ezpeleta) he played a major part in arranging her marriage to Ferdinand II of Aragon in October 1469. Even so, when the Catholic Monarchs came to power after Henry IV's death in December 1474, they immediately came into conflict with Carrillo. Carrillo would not accept their authoritarian treatment of him nor his enemy cardinal Pedro González de Mendoza's rise to be chancellor of the kingdom. This led him to clash with the Mendoza family, a battle he lost in the War of the Castilian Succession that followed (1475–1479). Completely changing his policy, Carrillo joined the camp led by the king of Portugal, which supported the claim to the Castilian throne by his niece, princess Joanna la Beltraneja, against the claim of Isabella I.

The war was long and cruel, but at the start of 1479 an offensive by the Catholic Monarchs definitively defeated the Portuguese and forced Carrillo to submit and accept the imposition of royal garrisons in all the fortresses he controlled, though he did hold onto his post as archbishop of Toledo.

On 12 May 1481 he condemned the existence of radical guilds and associations in Toledo that organized along racial lines and excluded Jewish converts to the Catholic faith. He died in the archepiscopal palace of Alcalá de Henares.

== Issue ==
While still young, he had two illegitimate sons:

- Troylos Carrillo, later count of Agosta
- Lope Vasquez de Acuña

== See also ==
- Alonso Carrillo's Mass of St Gregory

== Bibliography ==
- Guillermo Mireki, Apuntes genealógicos y biográficos de don Alfonso Carrillo de Acuña, Arzobispo de Toledo, Anales Toledanos vol. XXVIII, Instituto de Estudios Toledanos, Toledo, 1991 (pp. 55–76).
