= Carrascosa de Abajo =

- Municipality
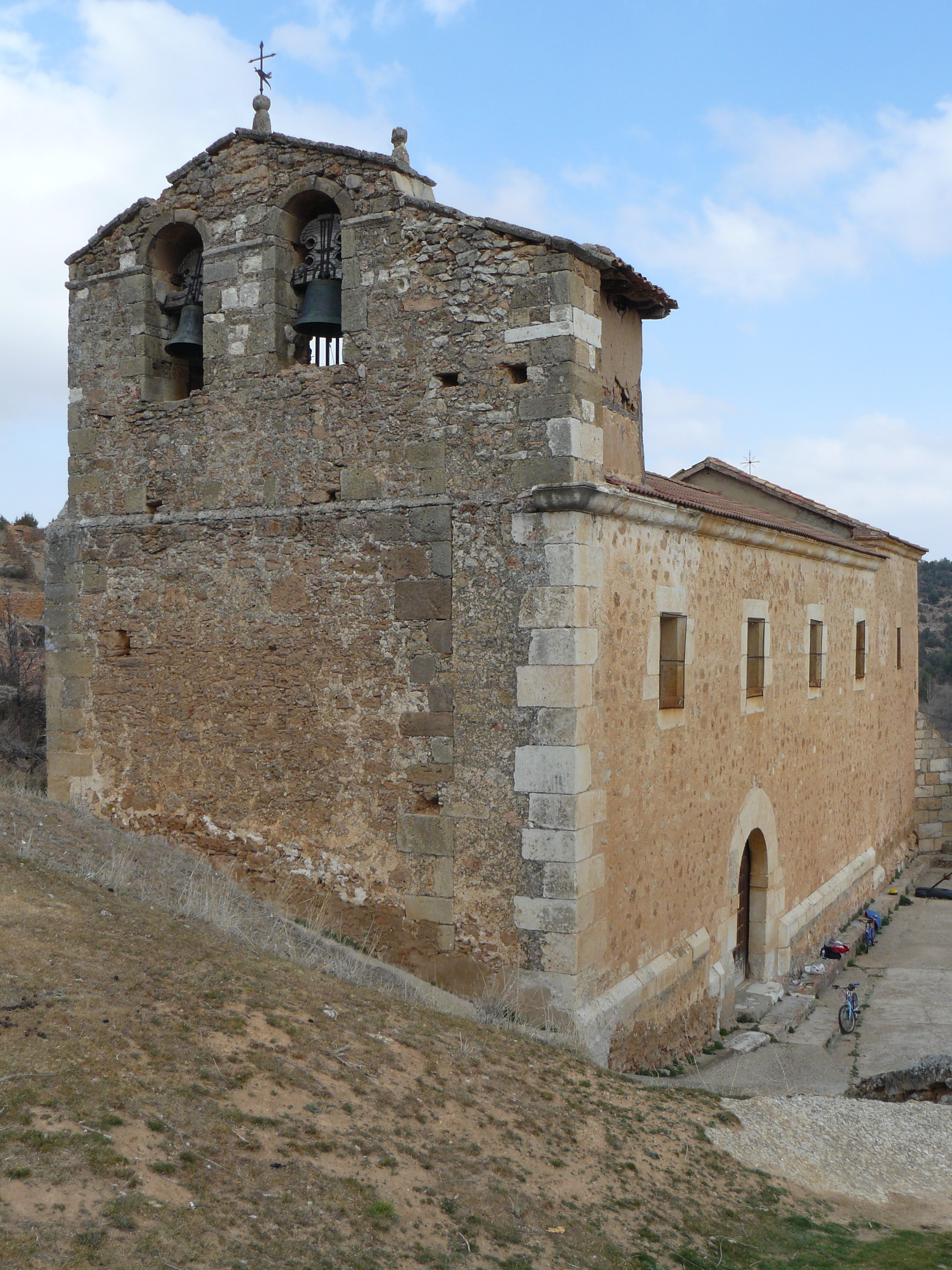
- Church of Carrascosa de Abajo

- Location in Spain. Carrascosa de Abajo (Spain)
- Country: Spain
- Autonomous community: Castile and León
- Province: Soria
- Municipality: Carrascosa de Abajo

Area
  - Total: 23.55 km^{2} (9.09 sq mi)
- Elevation: 1,023 m (3,356 ft)

Population (2025-01-01)
  - Total: 18
  - Density: 0.76/km^{2} (2.0/sq mi)
- Time zone: UTC+1 (CET)
  - Summer (DST): UTC+2 (CEST)
- Website: Official website

Carrascosa de Abajo is a municipality located in the province of Soria, Castile and León, Spain. According to the 2004 census (INE), the municipality had a population of 33 inhabitants.
