= Carrascosa del Campo =

Town in Castile-La Mancha, Spain

Coordinates: 40°2′10″N 2°44′12″W

Carrascosa del Campo is a town in the municipality of Campos del Paraíso, with a population of 602 (2007 census). It is located in the area called Mancha Alta y Sierra Media, in the Province of Cuenca, part of the autonomous community of Castile-La Mancha in Spain.
