= Carrascosa, Cuenca =

- Municipality
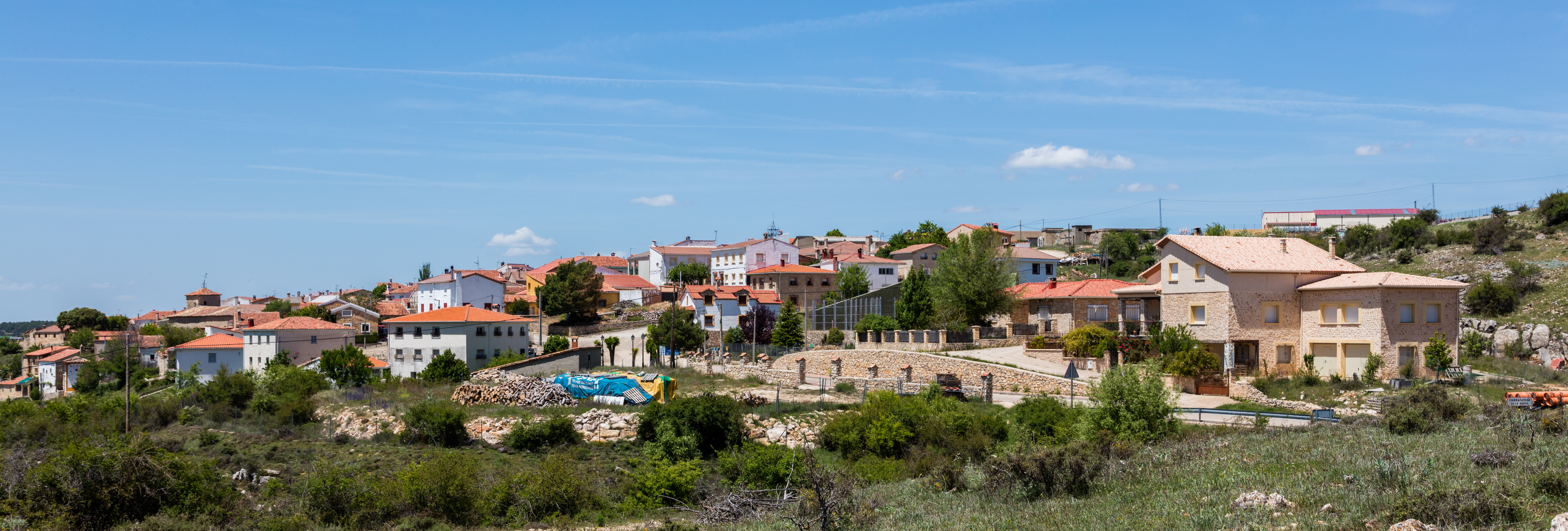

- Location within Spain Location within Castilla-La Mancha
- Coordinates: 40°35′37″N 2°9′47″W
- Country: Spain
- Autonomous community: Castile-La Mancha
- Province: Cuenca

Population (2025-01-01)
  - Total: 69
- Time zone: UTC+1 (CET)
  - Summer (DST): UTC+2 (CEST)

Carrascosa is a village in Cuenca, Castile-La Mancha, Spain. The municipality covers an area of 71.47 square kilometres (27.59 sq mi) and as of 2011 had a population of 117 people.
