= Carrascosa de la Sierra =

- Municipality
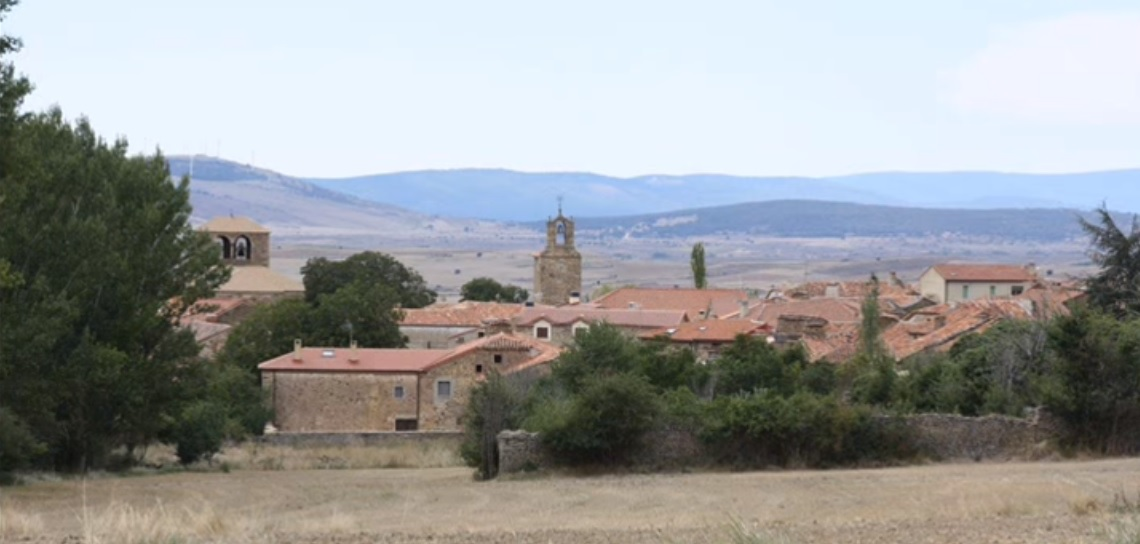
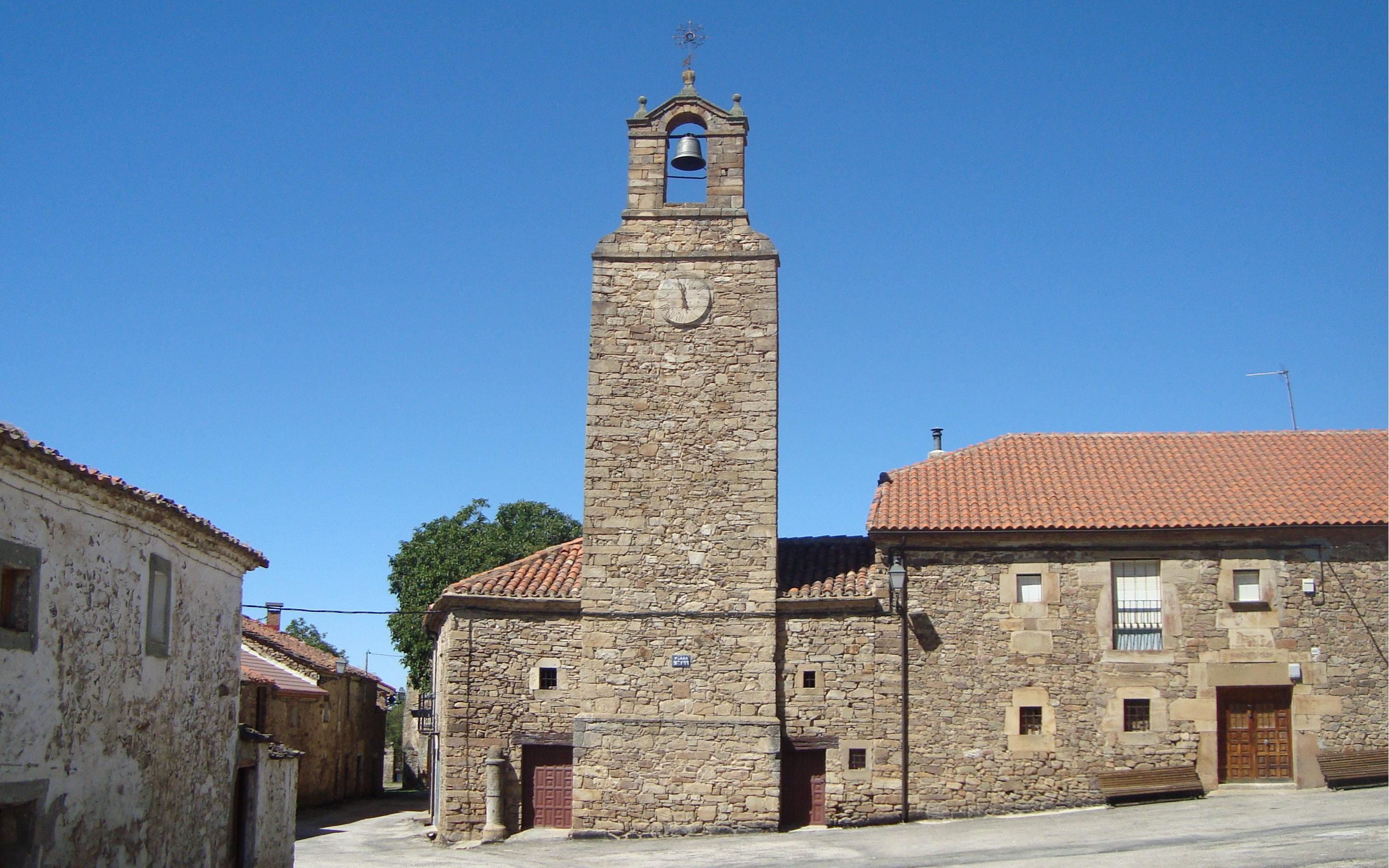
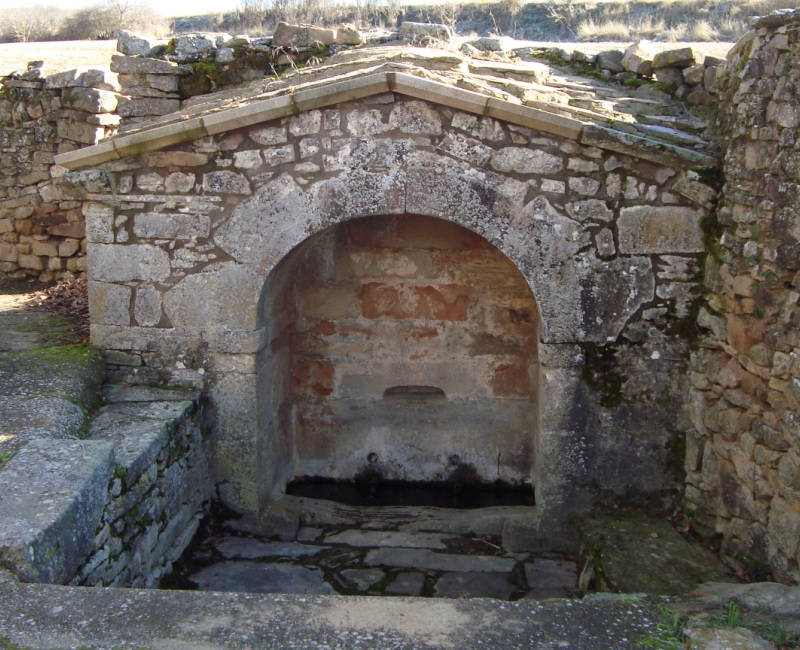
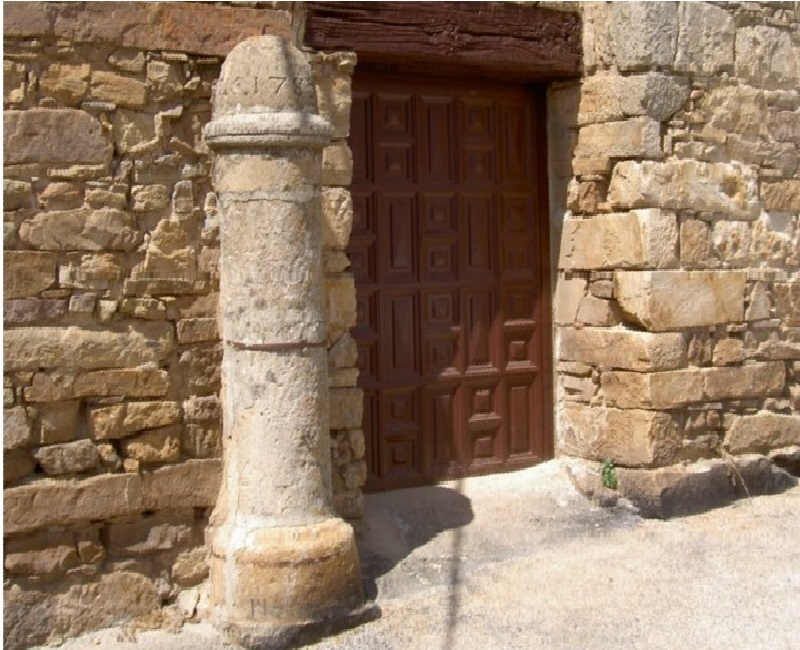

- Location in Spain. Carrascosa de la Sierra (Spain)
- Country: Spain
- Autonomous community: Castile and León
- Province: Soria
- Municipality: Carrascosa de la Sierra

Area
  - Total: 12.76 km^{2} (4.93 sq mi)
- Elevation: 1,184 m (3,885 ft)

Population (2025-01-01)
  - Total: 19
  - Density: 1.5/km^{2} (3.9/sq mi)
- Time zone: UTC+1 (CET)
  - Summer (DST): UTC+2 (CEST)
- Website: Official website

Carrascosa de la Sierra is a municipality located in the province of Soria, Castile and León, Spain. According to the 2004 census (INE), the municipality has a population of 13 inhabitants.
