= Campos del Paraíso =

Municipality of Spain

- Municipality
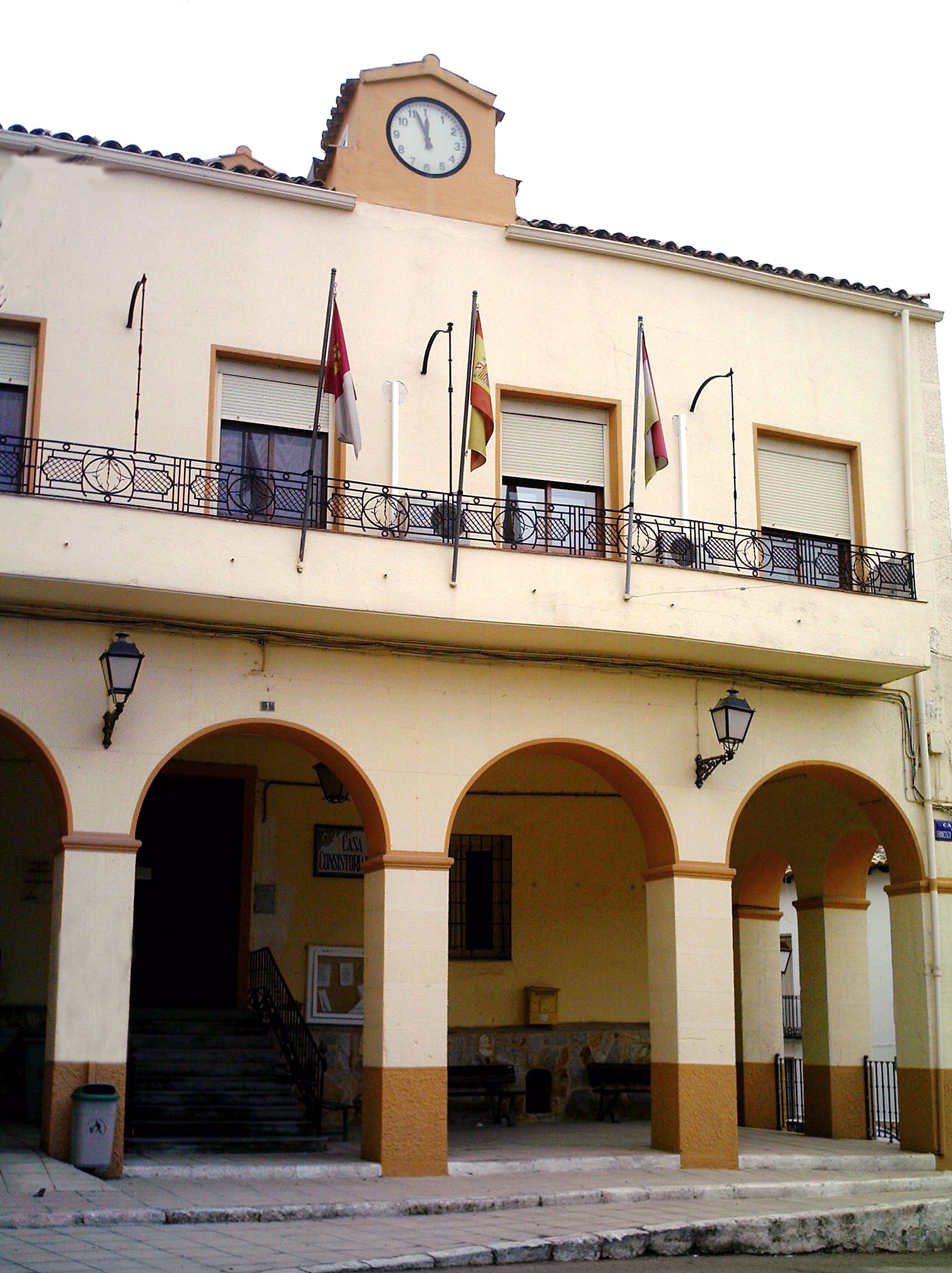

- Flag Coat of arms

- Location within Spain Location within Castilla-La Mancha
- Coordinates: 40°00′56″N 2°42′10″W
- Country: Spain
- Autonomous community: Castile-La Mancha
- Province: Cuenca

Population (2025-01-01)
  - Total: 646
- Time zone: UTC+1 (CET)
  - Summer (DST): UTC+2 (CEST)

Campos del Paraíso is a municipality in the province of Cuenca, Castile-La Mancha, Spain. It has a population of 1,069.
