= Zarzuela (disambiguation) =

Zarzuela means:

- Zarzuela, a Spanish lyric-dramatic genre
- Zarzuela de mariscos, a Catalan seafood stew
- the Palacio de la Zarzuela, residence of the Spanish King
- the Teatro de la Zarzuela in Madrid
- several places in Spain:
  - Zarzuela, Cuenca, a municipality in the province of Cuenca, in the autonomous community of Castile-La Mancha
  - Zarzuela de Jadraque, a municipality in the province of Guadalajara, in the autonomous community of Castile-La Mancha
  - Zarzuela del Monte, a municipality in the province of Segovia in the autonomous community of Castile-León
  - Zarzuela del Pinar, a municipality in the province of Segovia in the autonomous community of Castile-León
