= Zarzuela, Cuenca =

Zarzuela
- Municipality
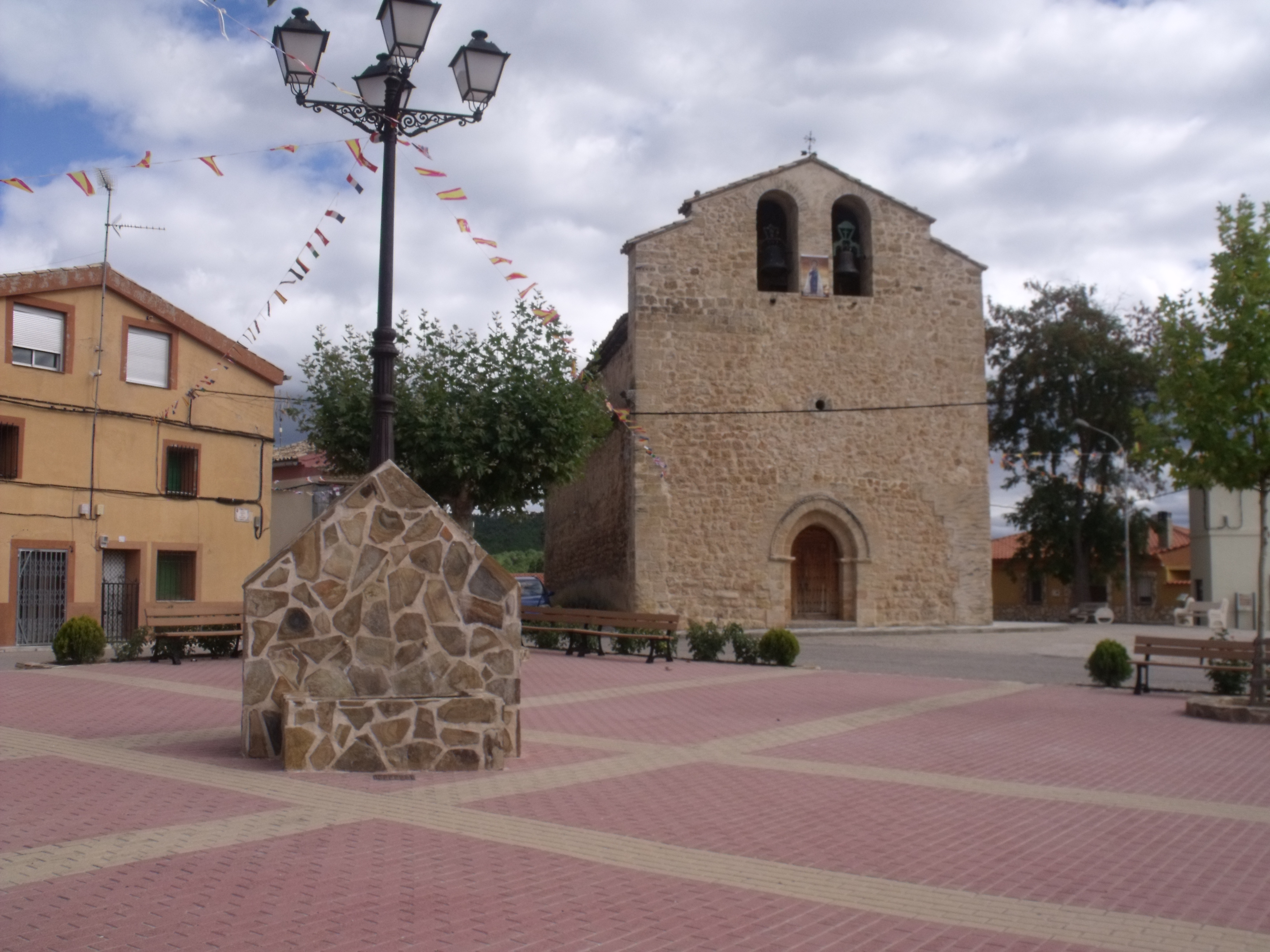

- Flag Coat of arms

- Location within Spain Location within Castilla-La Mancha
- Coordinates: 40°15′N 2°07′W
- Country: Spain
- Autonomous community: Castile-La Mancha
- Province: Cuenca

Government
  - Mayor: Alicio Triguero Arribas

Area
  - Total: 40.38 km^{2} (15.59 sq mi)
- Elevation: 1,059 m (3,474 ft)

Population (2025-01-01)
  - Total: 174
  - Density: 4.31/km^{2} (11.2/sq mi)
- Time zone: UTC+1 (CET)
  - Summer (DST): UTC+2 (CEST)

Zarzuela, Cuenca is a municipality in Cuenca, Castile-La Mancha, Spain. It has a population of 273.
