= Zarzuela de Jadraque =

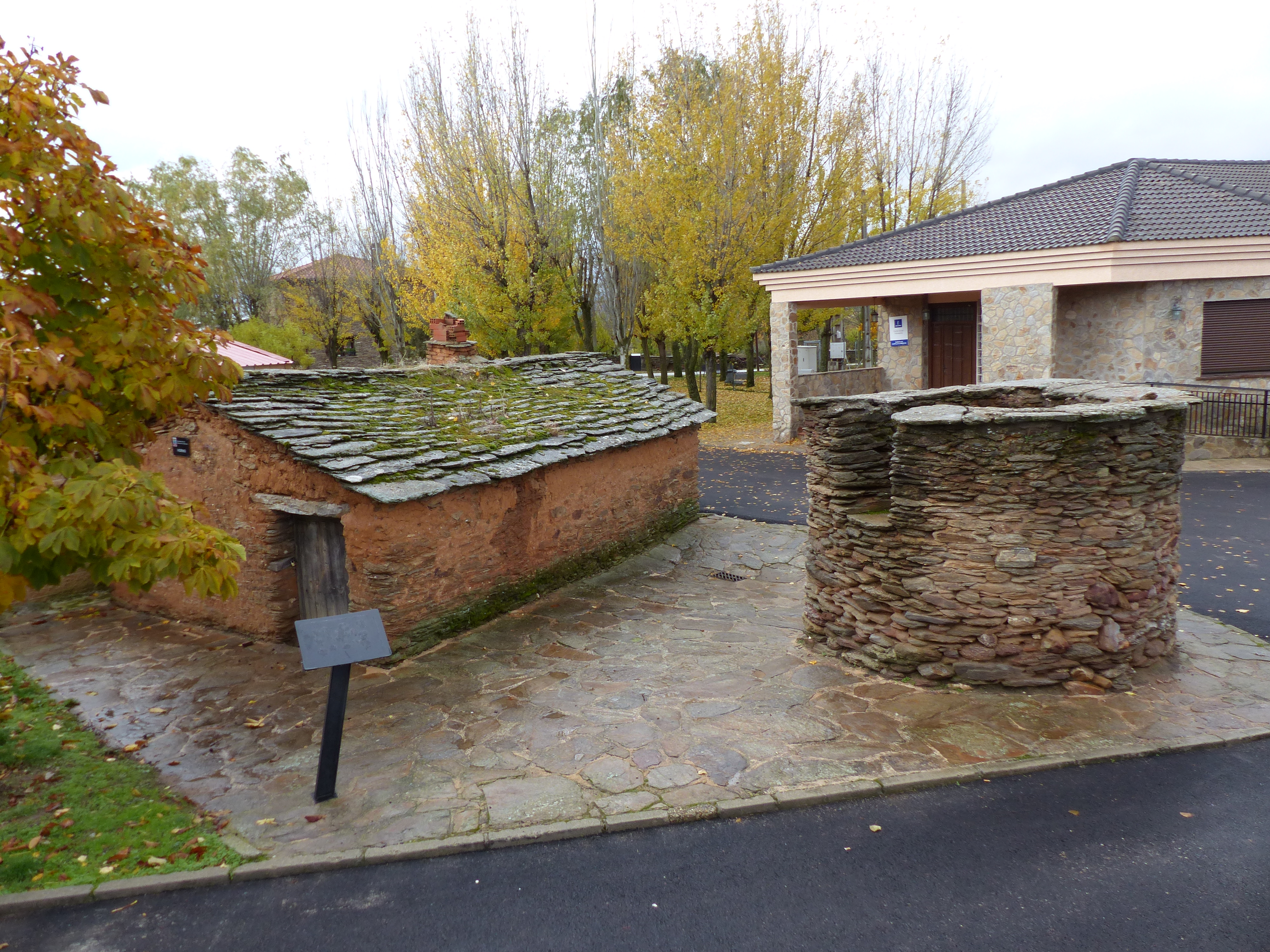

- Coat of arms

- Location in Spain Zarzuela de Jadraque (Castilla-La Mancha) Zarzuela de Jadraque (Spain)
- Coordinates: 41°04′06″N 3°02′40″W
- Country: Spain
- Autonomous community: Castile-La Mancha
- Province: Guadalajara
- Municipality: Zarzuela de Jadraque

Area
  - Total: 31.90 km^{2} (12.32 sq mi)
- Elevation: 1,043 m (3,422 ft)

Population (2025-01-01)
  - Total: 49
  - Density: 1.5/km^{2} (4.0/sq mi)
- Time zone: UTC+1 (CET)
  - Summer (DST): UTC+2 (CEST)

Zarzuela de Jadraque (Spanish pronunciation: [θaɾˈθwe.la ðe xaˈðɾa.ke]) is a municipality located in the province of Guadalajara, Castile-La Mancha, Spain. The town is considered to be an example of "arquitectura negra" or "black architecture" due to the traditional use of slate and other local dark stones in constructing homes and walls. Zarzuela de Jadraque was also historically called "Zarzuela de las Ollas" or "Zarzuela of the Jars/Amphora" due to a tradition of producing hand thrown pots and amphora from an abundance of local clay. The original pottery kiln is still visible on the outskirts of the town. The town has one religious building, the church of San Clemente Romano, a Romanesque style church dating to the thirteenth century and built on the edge of enormous stone boulders. Other historic buildings include a town hall, communal outdoor laundry washing building, livestock and horse watering fountain and cemetery. According to the 2004 census (INE), the municipality has a population of 46 inhabitants although the population of the town swells in the summer and holiday months with descendants of past town dwellers who come to spend their vacations.

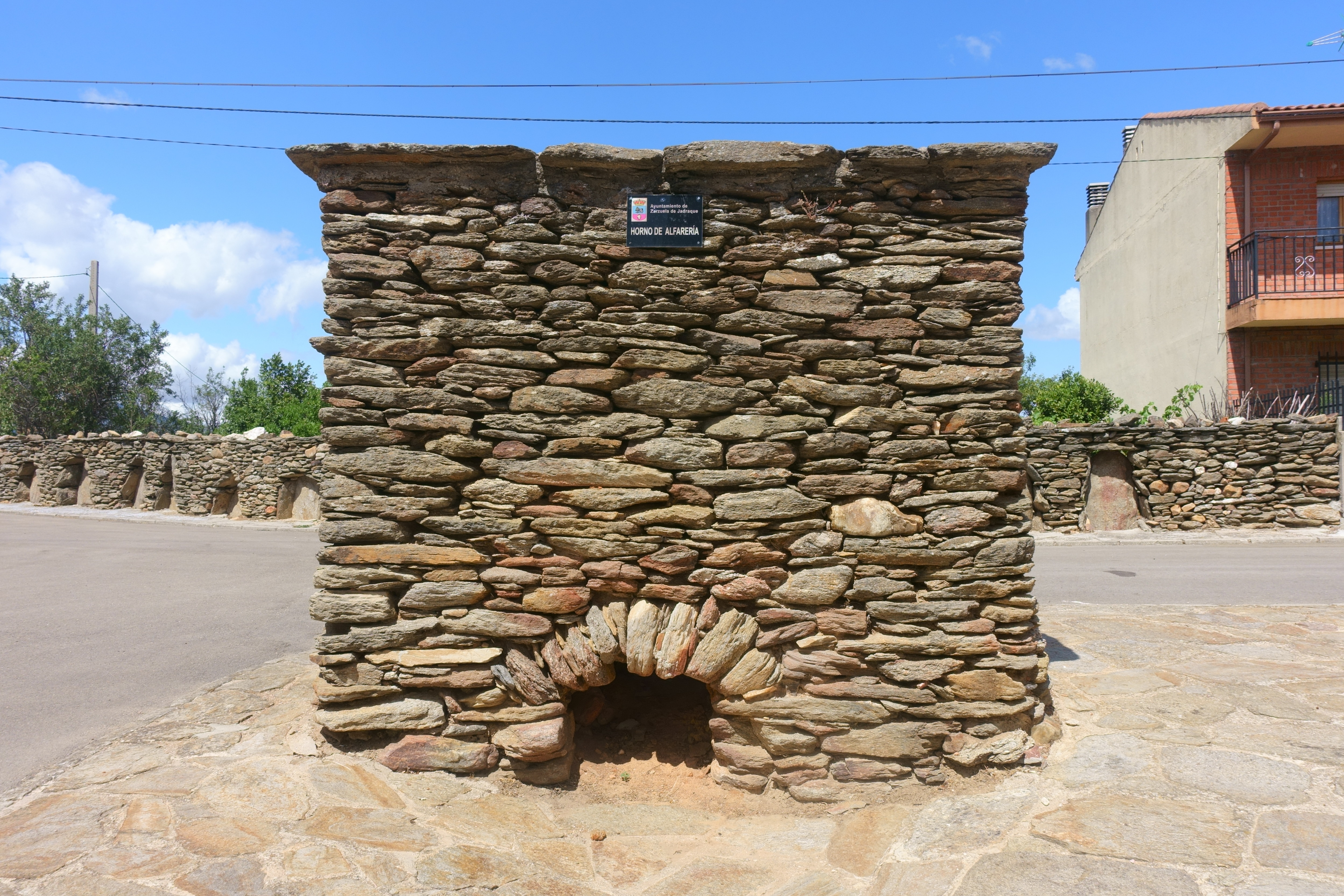
Pottery kiln, Zarzuela de Jadraque

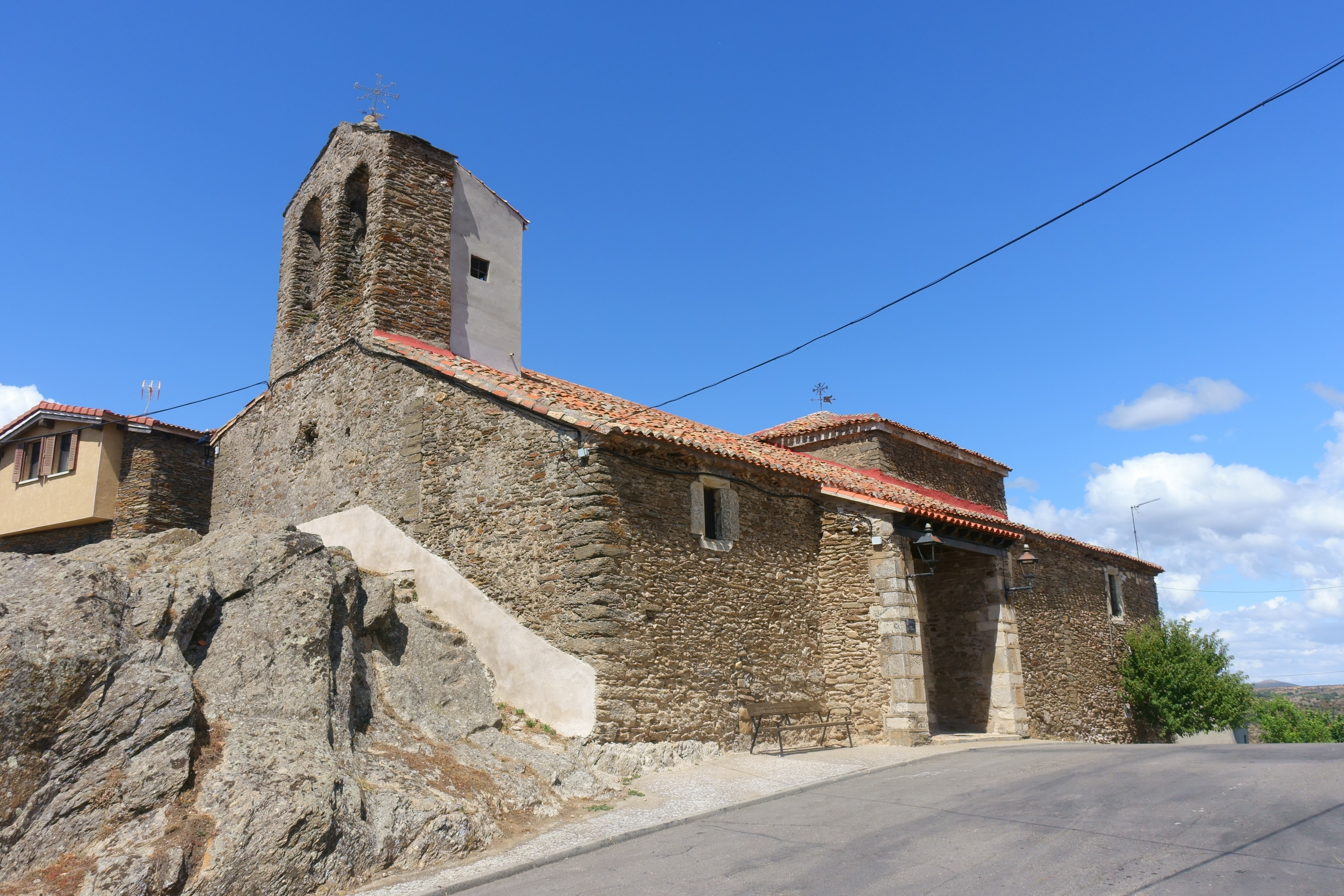
San Clemente Church, Zarzuela de Jadraque

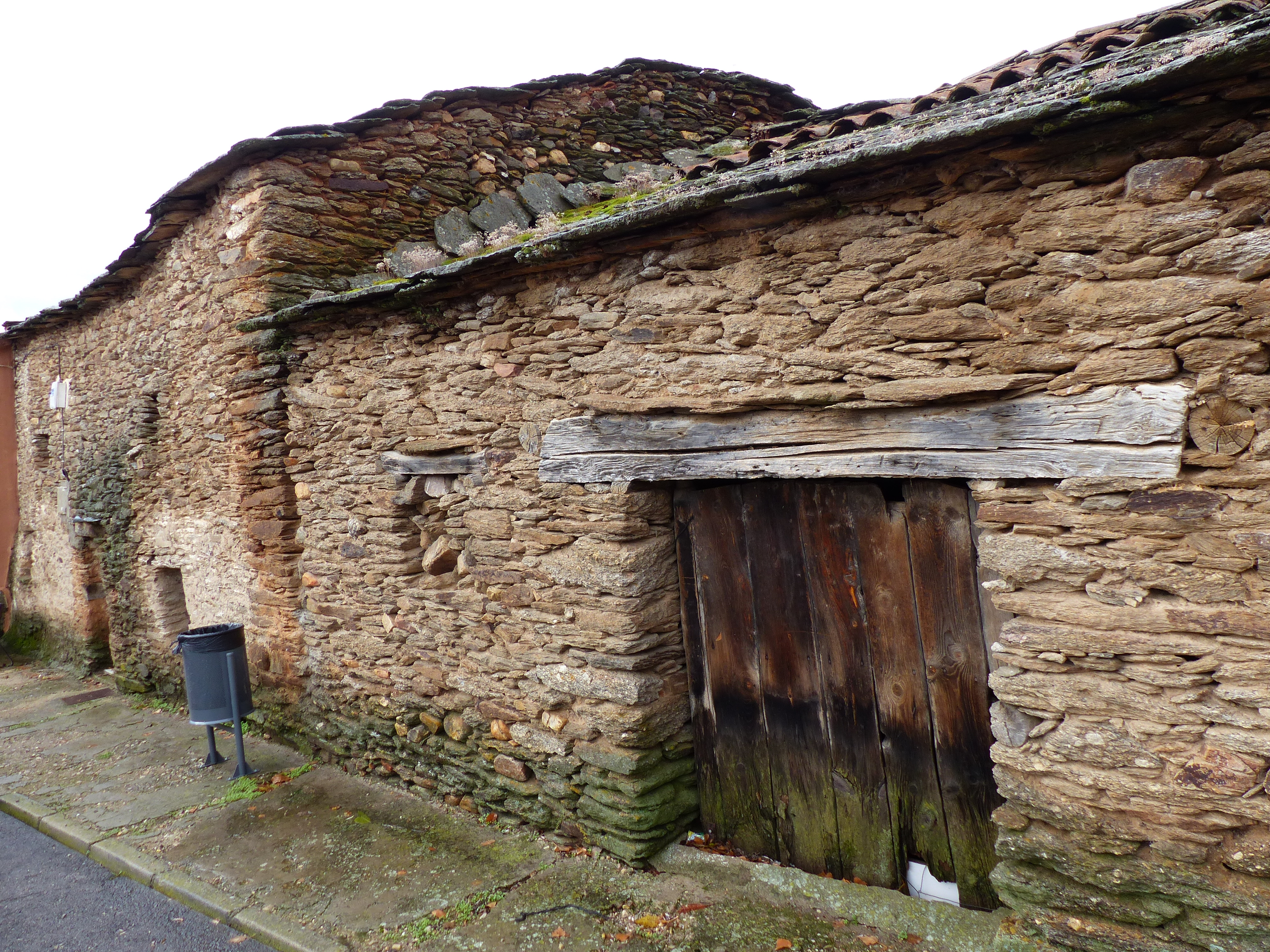
Zarzuela de Jadraque- traditional dark stone architecture

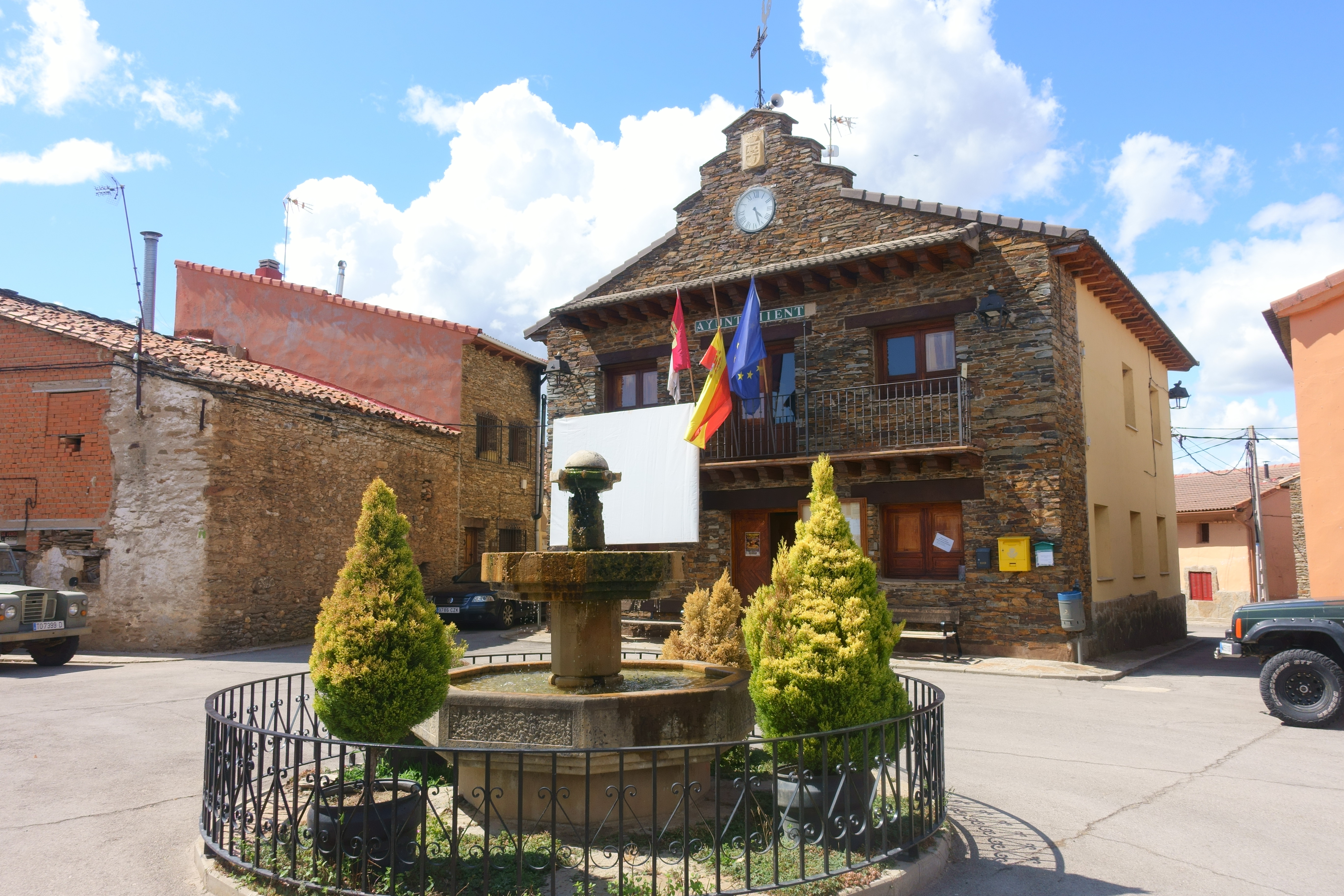
Zarzuela de Jadraque Town Hall

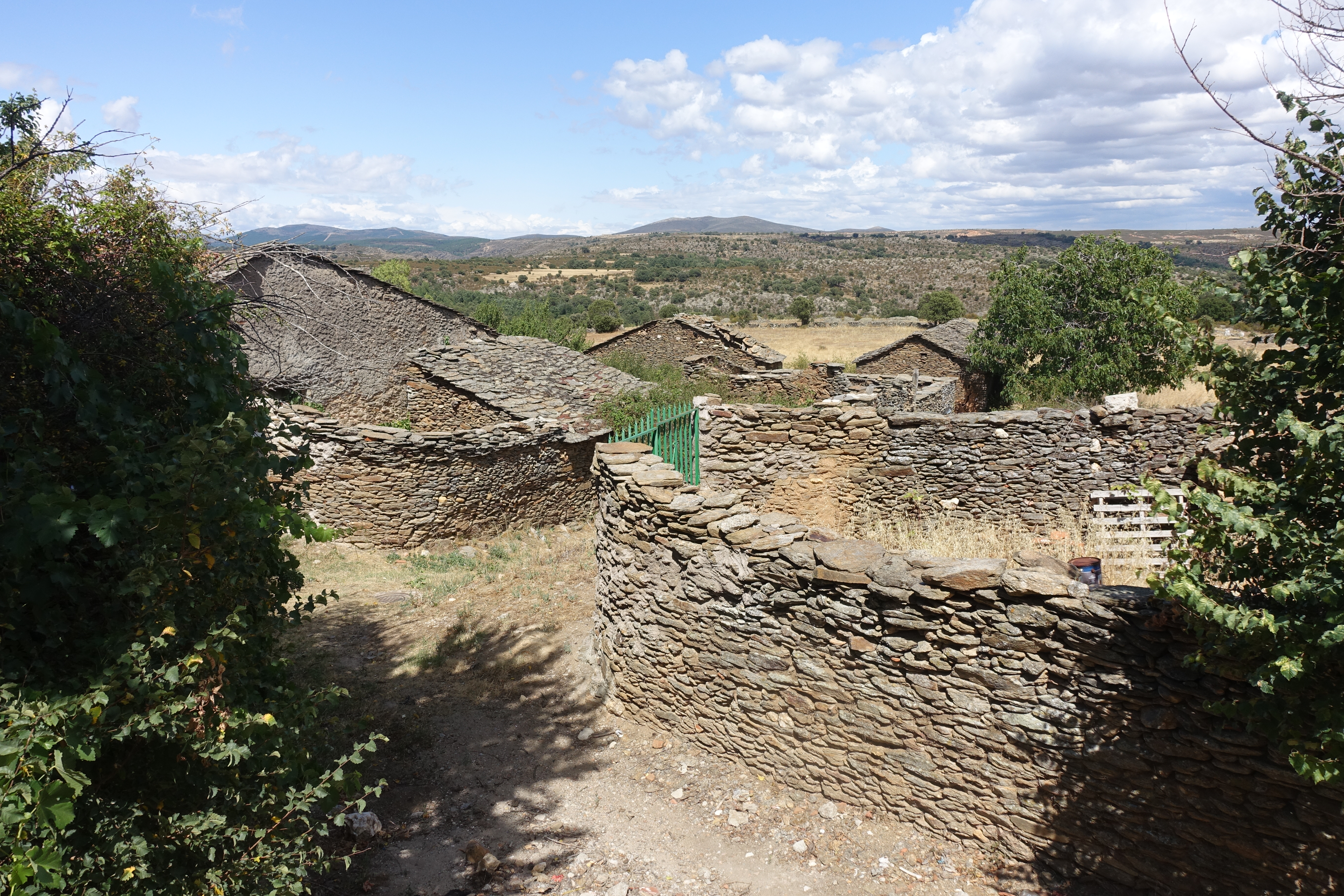
Zarzuela de Jadraque - Traditional architecture
