= Pajares (Cuenca) =

- Village
- Location within Spain
- Coordinates: 40°18′59″N 2°11′40″W
- Country: Spain
- Autonomous community: Castilla–La Mancha
- Province: Province of Cuenca
- Municipality: Sotorribas
- Elevation: 945 m (3,100 ft)

Population
  - Total: 30

Pajares is a hamlet located in the municipality of Sotorribas, in Cuenca province, Castilla–La Mancha, Spain. As of 2020, it has a population of 30.

== Geography ==
Pajares is located 34km west-northwest of Cuenca, Spain.
