= Ribatajada =

- EATIM
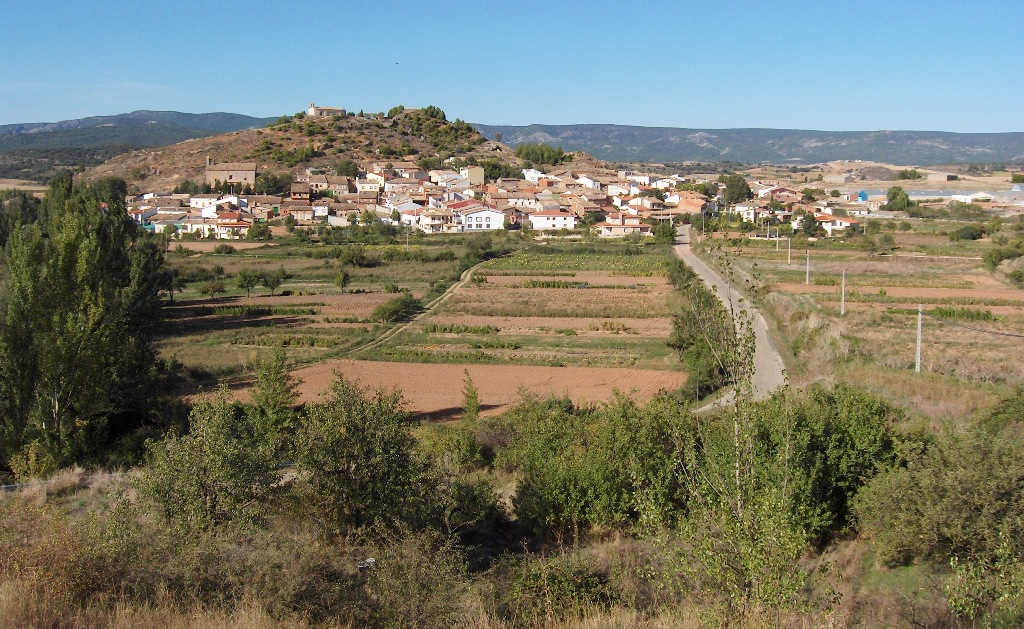

- Location in Spain Ribatajada (Spain)
- Coordinates: 40°20′16″N 2°10′31″W
- Country: Spain
- Autonomous community: Castile-La Mancha
- Province: Cuenca
- Municipality: Sotorribas

Ribatajada is a village and EATIM of Spain located in the province of Cuenca, Castilla–La Mancha, belonging to the municipality of Sotorribas. A former municipality, it became part of the municipality of Sotorribas between 1970 and 1981. (Note: The decree approving the merger of the Municipalities of Ribagorda, Ribatajada, Ribatajadilla, Torrecilla, Collados and Sotos into the municipality of "Sotorribas" was published in the Boletín Oficial del Estado on 30 April 1976.)
