= Torrecilla (Cuenca) =

- Village
- Location within Spain
- Coordinates: 40°17′31″N 2°12′14″W
- Country: Spain
- Autonomous community: Castilla–La Mancha
- Province: Province of Cuenca
- Municipality: Sotorribas
- Elevation: 953 m (3,127 ft)

Population
  - Total: 18

Torrecilla is a hamlet located in the municipality of Sotorribas, in Cuenca province, Castilla–La Mancha, Spain. As of 2020, it has a population of 18.

== Geography ==
Torrecilla is located 37km west-northwest of Cuenca, Spain.
