= Ribagorda =

- Village
- Location within Spain
- Coordinates: 40°20′2″N 2°13′49″W
- Country: Spain
- Autonomous community: Castilla–La Mancha
- Province: Province of Cuenca
- Municipality: Sotorribas
- Elevation: 980 m (3,220 ft)

Population
  - Total: 68

Ribagorda is a hamlet located in the municipality of Sotorribas, in Cuenca province, Castilla–La Mancha, Spain. As of 2020, it has a population of 68.

== Geography ==
Ribagorda is located 38km west-northwest of Cuenca, Spain.
