= Villaseca (Cuenca) =

- Village
- Location within Spain
- Coordinates: 40°19′7″N 2°12′47″W
- Country: Spain
- Autonomous community: Castilla–La Mancha
- Province: Province of Cuenca
- Municipality: Sotorribas
- Elevation: 929 m (3,048 ft)

Population
  - Total: 4

Villaseca is a hamlet located in the municipality of Sotorribas, in Cuenca province, Castilla–La Mancha, Spain. As of 2020, it has a population of 4.

== Geography ==
Villaseca is located 35km west-northwest of Cuenca, Spain.
