= Sotorribas =

- Municipality
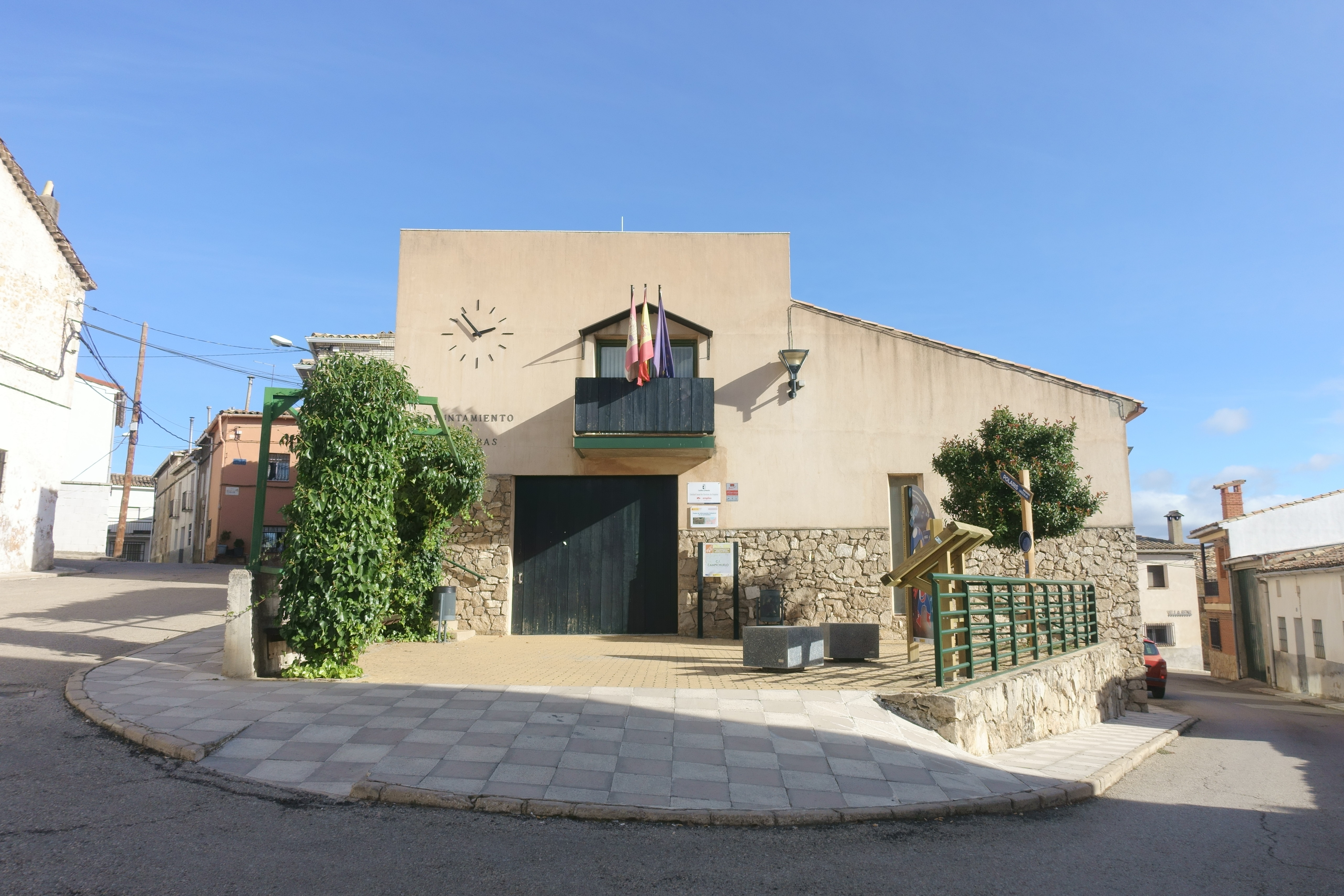
- The town hall, located in Sotos

- Location within Spain Location within Castilla-La Mancha
- Country: Spain
- Autonomous community: Castile-La Mancha
- Province: Cuenca

Area
  - Total: 149.21 km^{2} (57.61 sq mi)

Population (2025-01-01)
  - Total: 711
  - Density: 4.77/km^{2} (12.3/sq mi)
- Time zone: UTC+1 (CET)
  - Summer (DST): UTC+2 (CEST)

Sotorribas is a municipality of Spain located in the province of Cuenca, Castilla–La Mancha. As of 1 January 2020, it has a registered population of 700. The municipality spans across a total area of 149.21 km^{2}.

It is formed by the localities of Sotos (the capital), Collados, Pajares, Ribagorda, Ribatajadilla, Torrecilla, Villaseca and Ribatajada, the latter of which constituted as an EATIM in 2006.
