= Collados (Cuenca) =

- Village
- Location within Spain
- Coordinates: 40°15′32″N 2°11′57″W
- Country: Spain
- Autonomous community: Castilla–La Mancha
- Province: Province of Cuenca
- Municipality: Sotorribas
- Elevation: 999 m (3,278 ft)

Population
  - Total: 29

Collados is a hamlet located in the municipality of Sotorribas, in Cuenca province, Castilla–La Mancha, Spain. As of 2021, it has a population of 29.

== Geography ==
Collados is located 22km north of Cuenca, Spain.
