= Ribatajadilla =

- Village
- Location within Spain
- Coordinates: 40°19′14″N 2°9′2″W
- Country: Spain
- Autonomous community: Castilla–La Mancha
- Province: Province of Cuenca
- Municipality: Sotorribas
- Elevation: 1,023 m (3,356 ft)

Population
  - Total: 38

Ribatajadilla is a hamlet located in the municipality of Sotorribas, in Cuenca province, Castilla–La Mancha, Spain. As of 2020, it has a population of 38.

== Geography ==
Ribatajadilla is located 28km northwest of Cuenca, Spain.
