= Zafra de Záncara =

Zafra de Záncara]
- Municipality
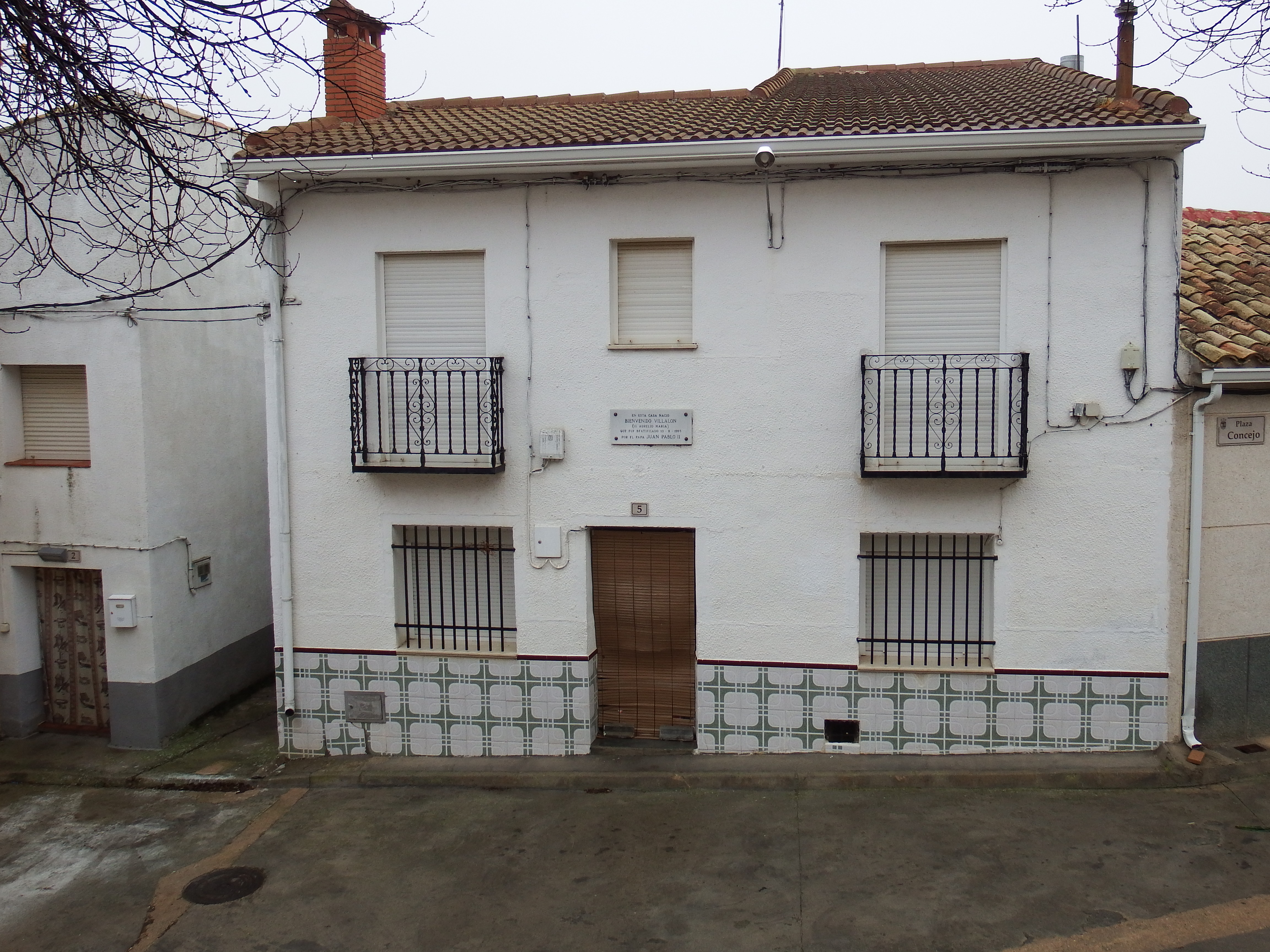

- Location within Spain Location within Castilla-La Mancha
- Coordinates: 39°54′N 2°33′W
- Country: Spain
- Autonomous community: Castile-La Mancha
- Province: Cuenca

Population (2025-01-01)
  - Total: 92
- Time zone: UTC+1 (CET)
  - Summer (DST): UTC+2 (CEST)

Zafra de Záncara is a municipality in Cuenca, Autonomous Community of Castile-La Mancha, Spain. It has an area of 78.83 km^{2} (30.44 sq mi) with a population of 155 inhabitants (INE 2008) and a population density of 1.967/km^{2} (5.095/sq mi).

== Population growth ==
The Zafra de Záncara population has been decreasing since the early twentieth century (2000 inhabitants approx.) to the present, suffering the same problem of depopulation of rural areas in Spain.

== Services ==
Zafra de Záncara does not have many basic services. There are no schools nor permanent medical doctors. Currently there is a house, a bar and a shop in the town center, along with two restaurants and a shop next to the A3.

== Settlers ==
The populace is primarily dedicated to agriculture. There are remnants of Iberian, Visigoth and Arab settlements, of which few traces remain. The Arab influences can be seen in the remains of walls and castles and in the layout of most streets.

== Demography ==
Population change
1991	1996	2001	2004
281	235	185	173

== Famous natives ==
- Fernando Casado de Torres e Irala (1754–1829): squadron leader and general commander of the Corps of Engineers of the Royal Spanish Navy.

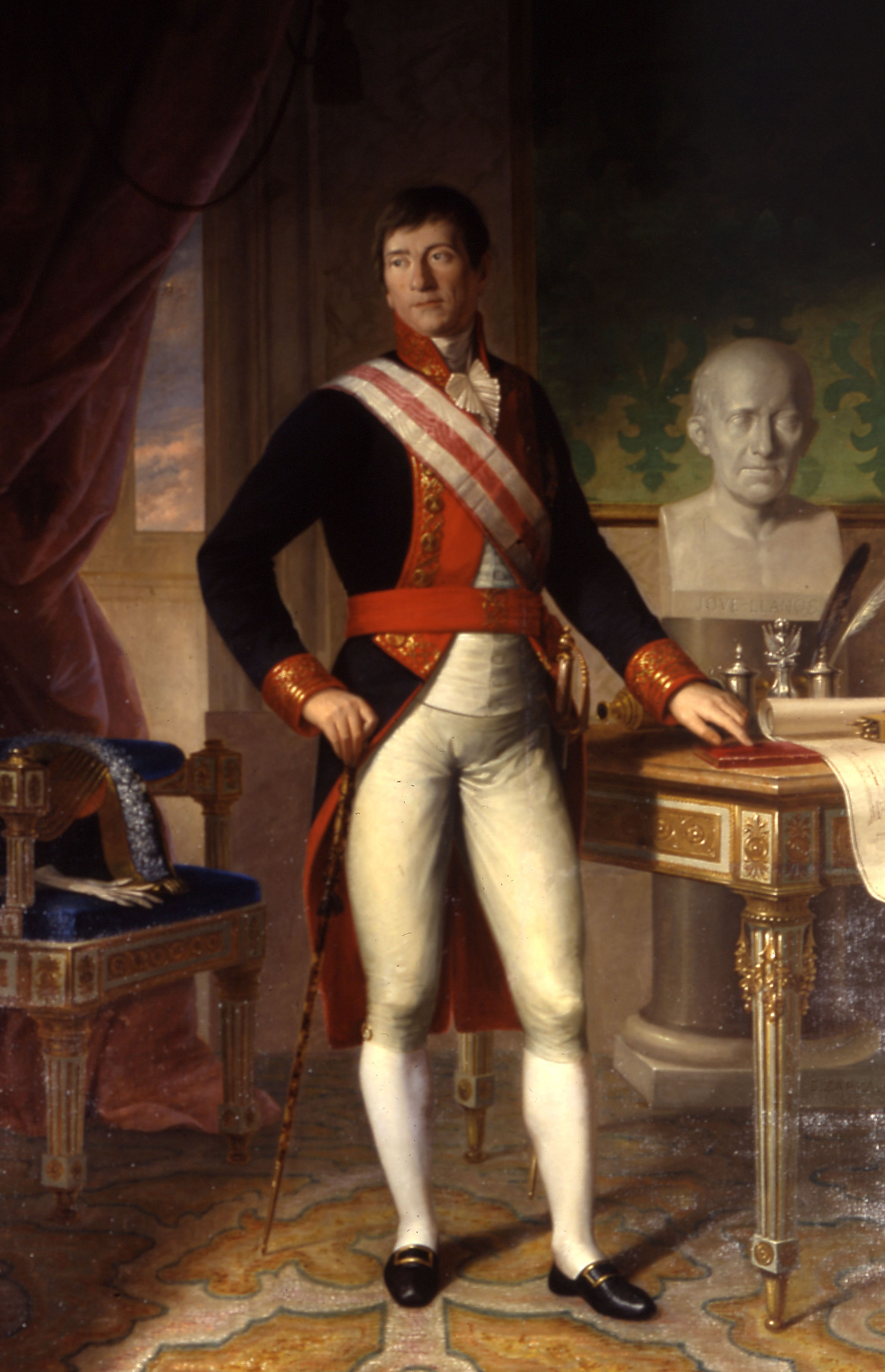
Fernando Casado de Torres e Irala
