= Talayuelas =

Talayuelas, Spain
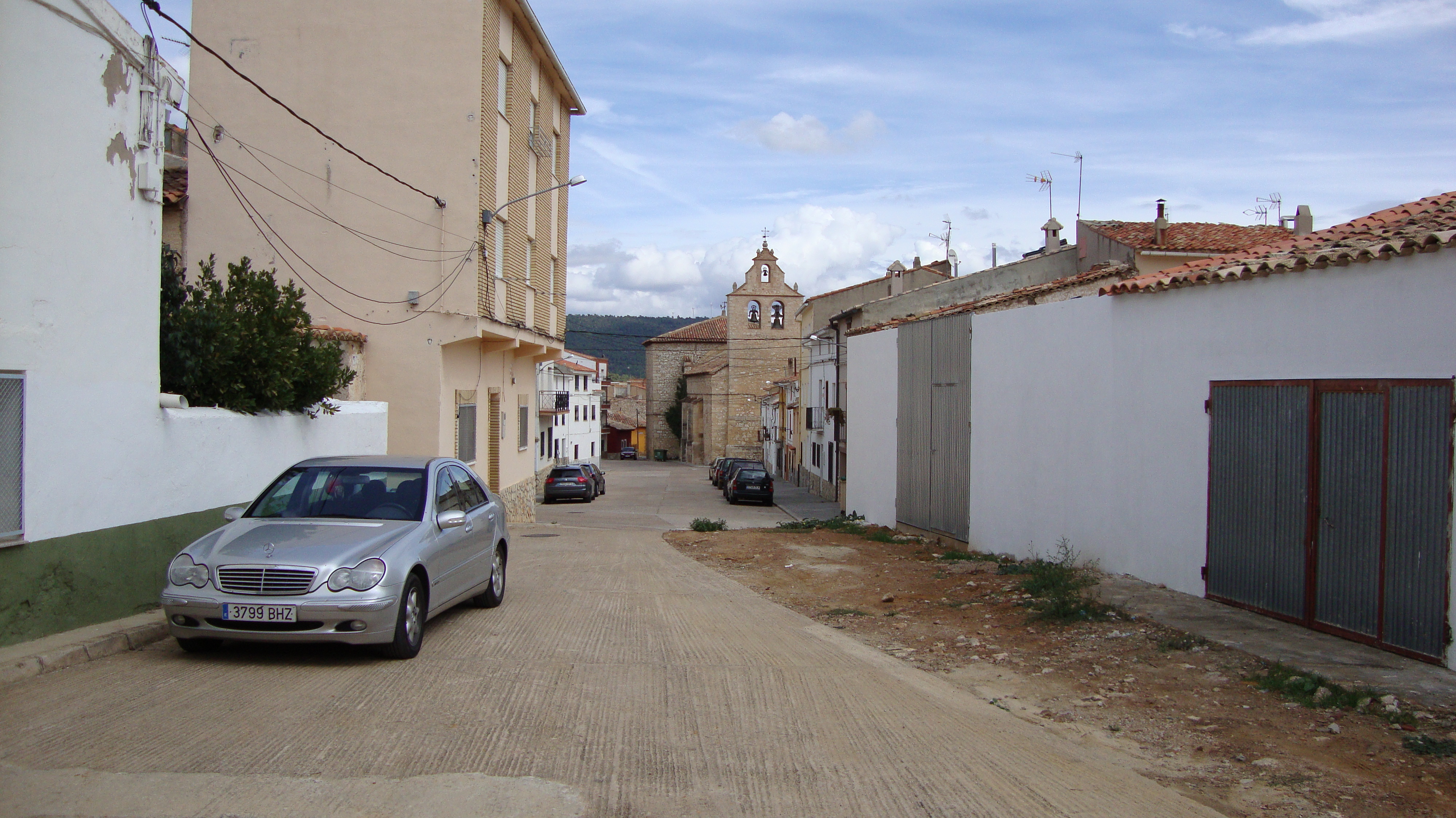
- Street of Talayuelas

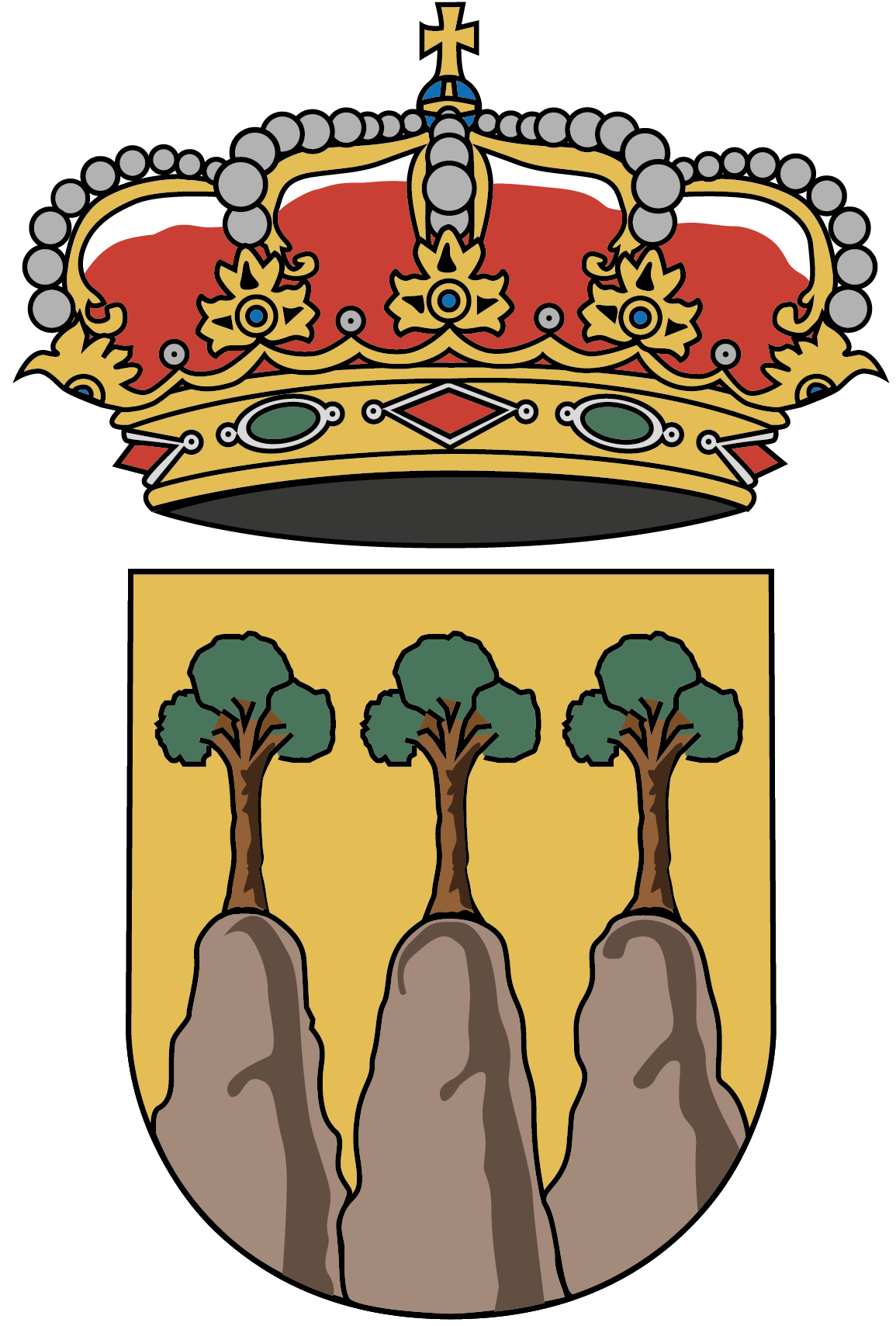
- Coat of arms

- Location within Spain Location within Castilla-La Mancha
- Coordinates: 39°50′0″N 1°17′0″W
- Country: Spain
- Autonomous community: Castile-La Mancha
- Province: Cuenca
- Municipality: Talayuelas

Area
  - Total: 106 km^{2} (41 sq mi)

Population (2025-01-01)
  - Total: 873
  - Density: 8.24/km^{2} (21.3/sq mi)
- Time zone: UTC+1 (CET)
  - Summer (DST): UTC+2 (CEST)

Talayuelas, is a municipality located in the province of Cuenca, Castile-La Mancha, Spain. According to the 2004 census (INE), the municipality has a population of 1,144 inhabitants.
