= Albacete =

- Municipality
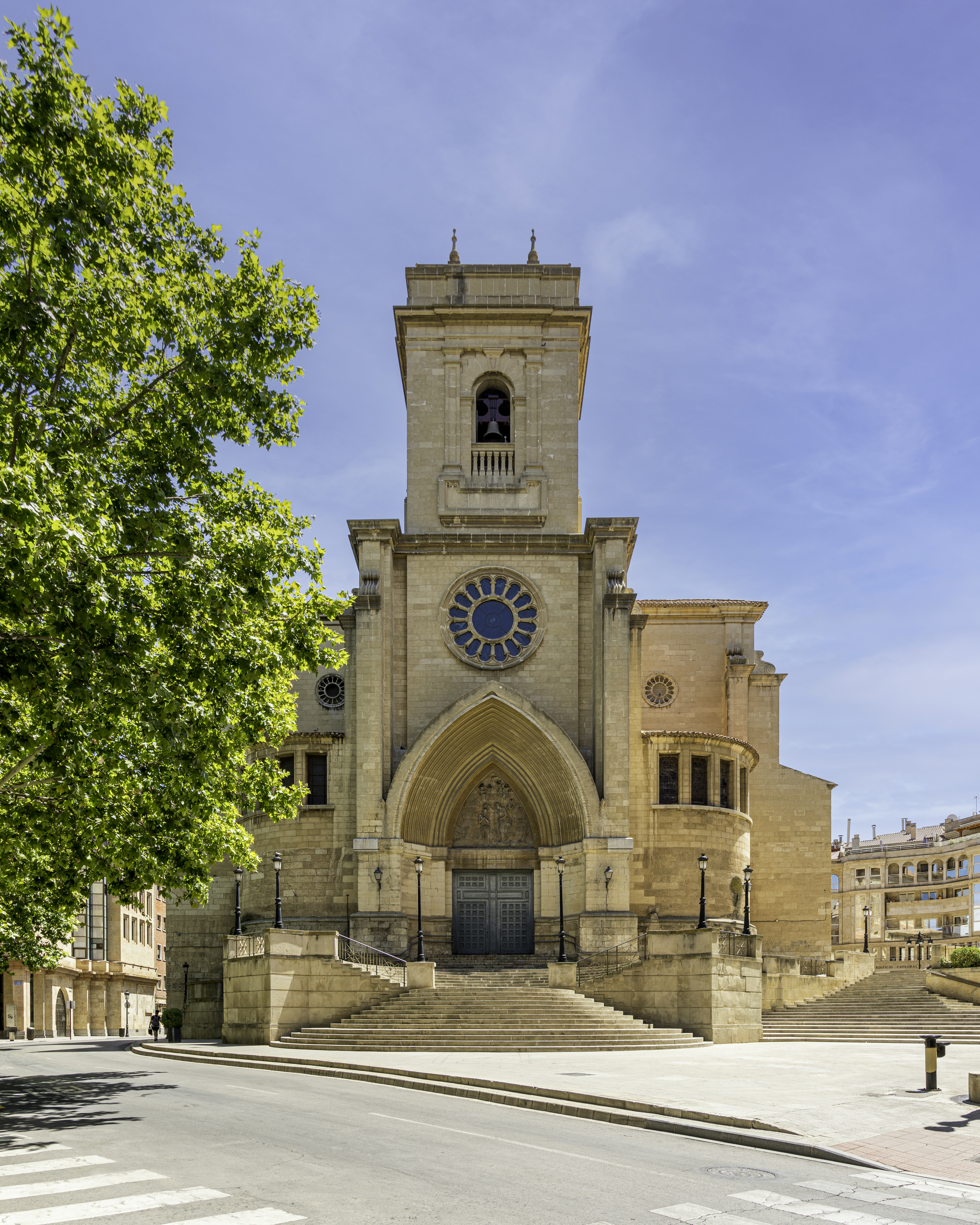
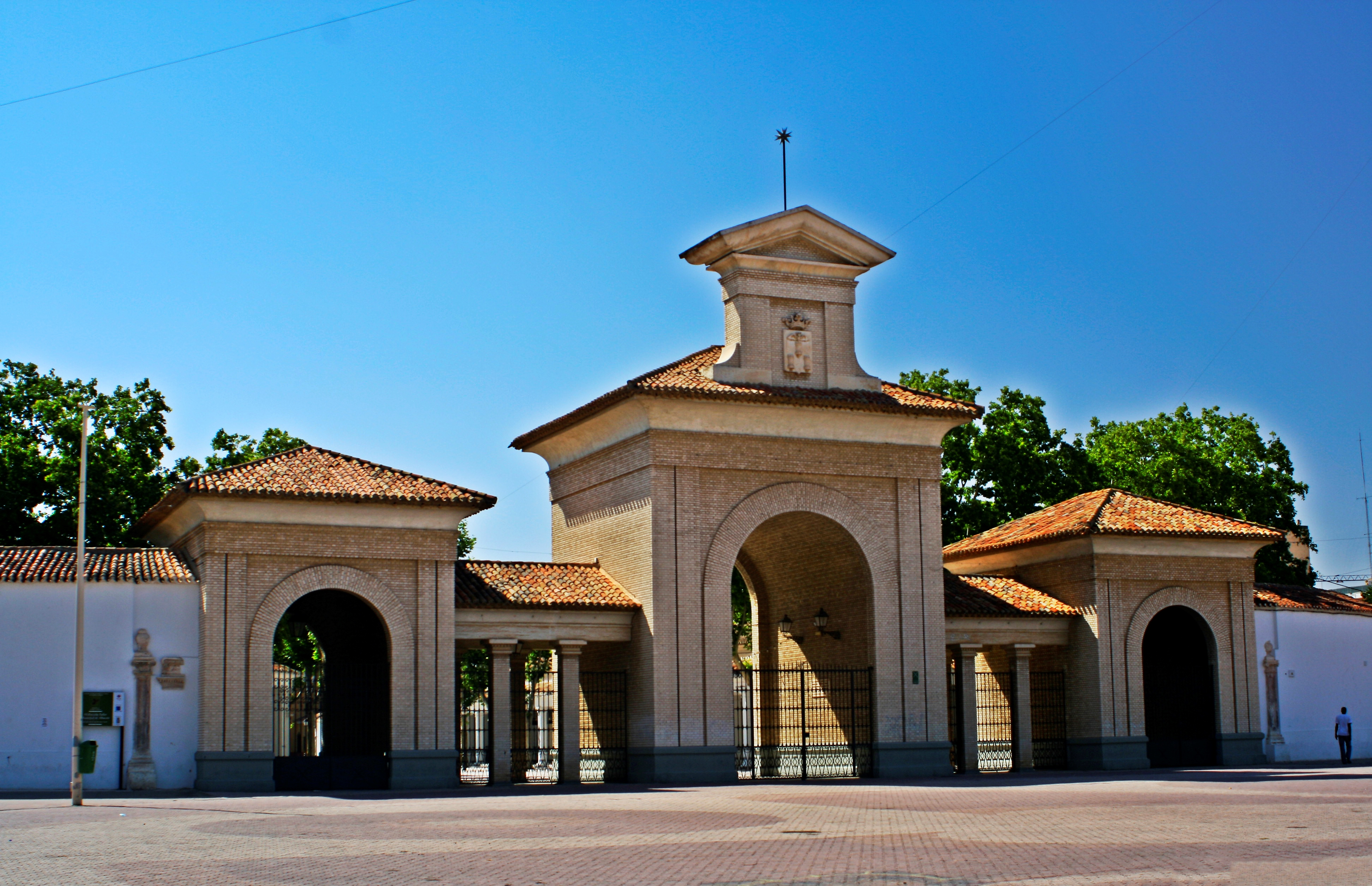
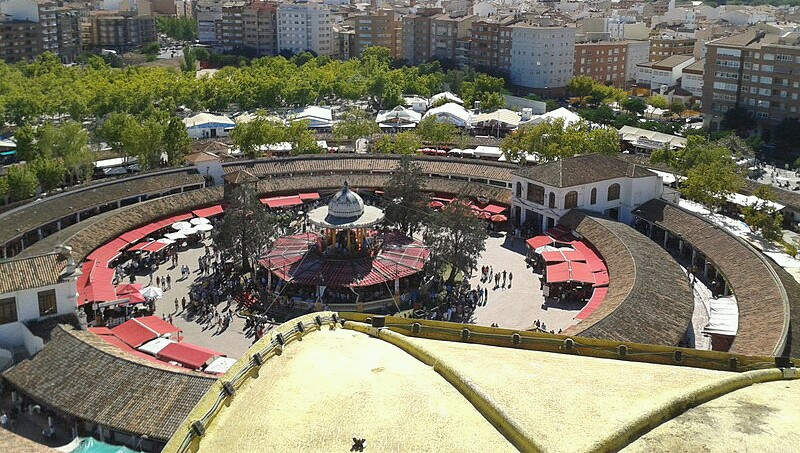
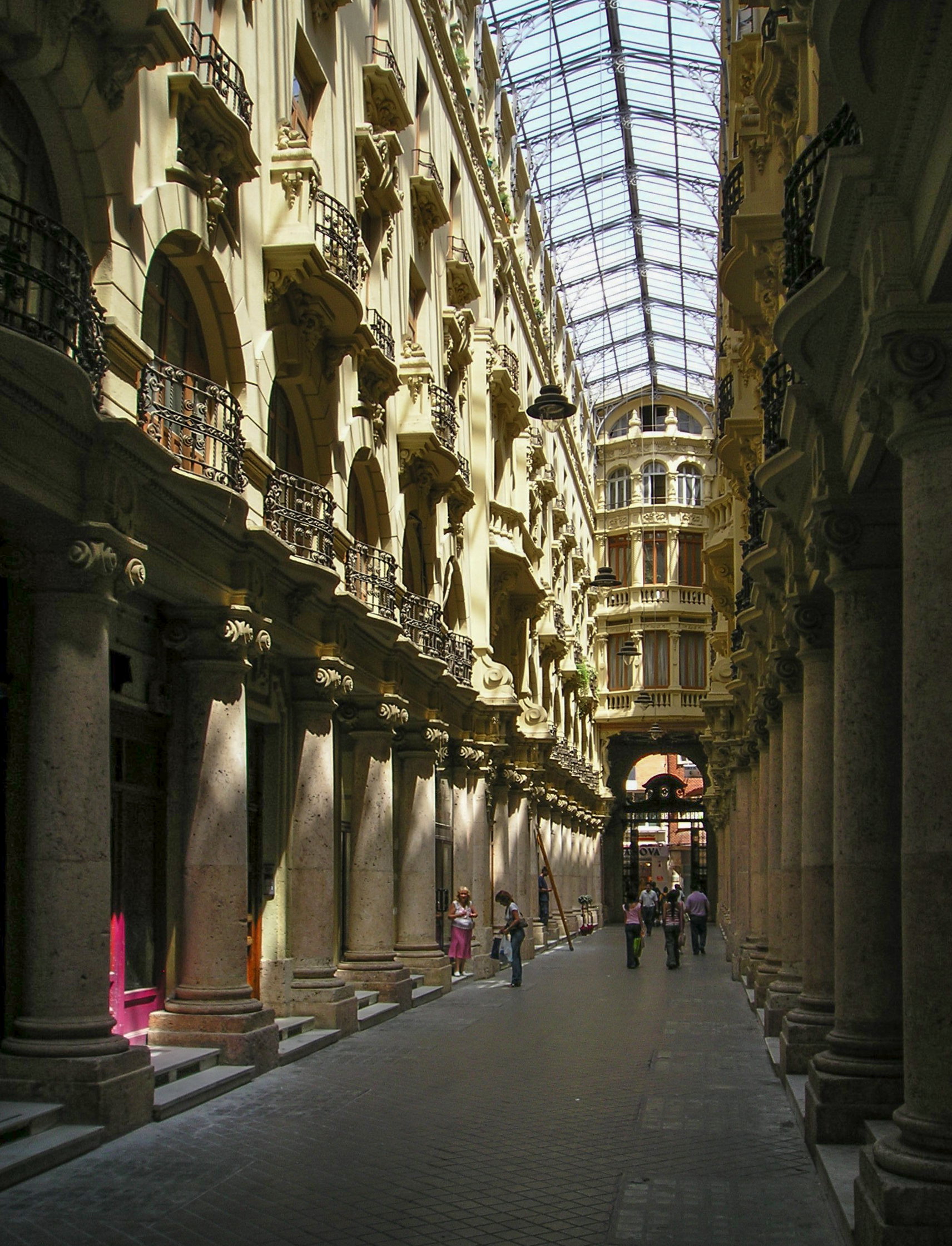
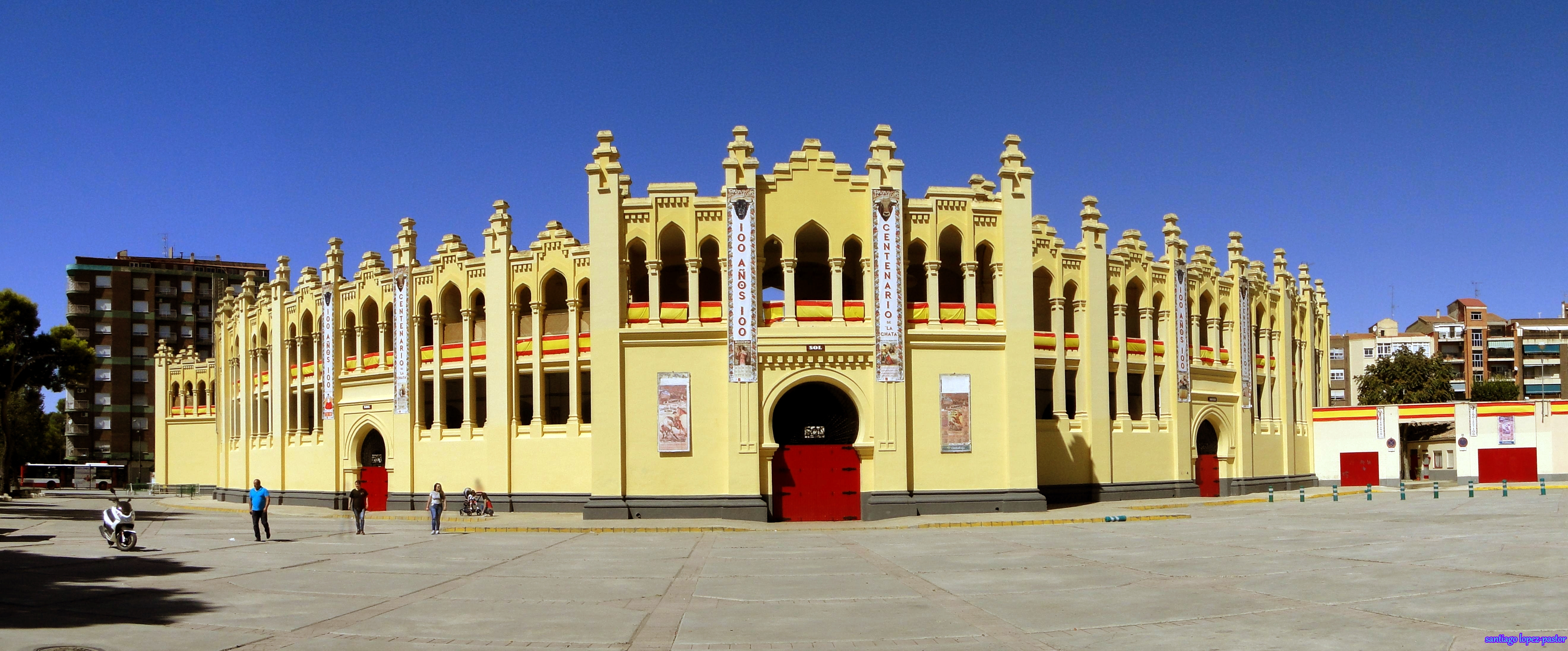
- Cathedral Puerta de Hierros Fairgrounds Lodares Passage Bullring

- Flag Coat of arms
- Interactive map of Albacete
- Location within Castilla-La Mancha Location within Spain
- Coordinates: 38°59′44″N 1°51′21″W
- Country: Spain
- Autonomous community: Castilla–La Mancha
- Province: Albacete

Government
  - Type: Ayuntamiento
  - Body: Ayuntamiento de Albacete
  - Mayor: Emilio Sáez Cruz (PSOE)

Area
  - Total: 1,125.91 km^{2} (434.72 sq mi)
- Elevation: 686 m (2,251 ft)

Population (2025-01-01)
  - Total: 175,400
  - Density: 155.8/km^{2} (403.5/sq mi)
- Demonyms: Albacetian, Albacetene, albaceteño, -ña; albacetense
- Time zone: UTC+1 (CET)
  - Summer (DST): UTC+2 (CEST)
- Postal code: 02XXX
- Area code: +34 (ES) + 967 (AB)
- Website: albacete.com

Albacete (/ˌælbəˈseɪti/ AL-bə-SAY-tee, US also /ˌɑːlbɑːˈseɪteɪ/ AHL-bah-SAY-tay, Spanish: [alβaˈθete]) is a city and municipality in the Spanish autonomous community of Castilla–La Mancha, and capital of the province of Albacete.

Lying in the south-east of the Iberian Peninsula, the area around the city is known as Los Llanos. Halfway between Madrid and the Mediterranean coast, it benefits from connections by motorway, railway (including AVE), and air (Albacete Airport). With a population of 174,336 (2020), it is the largest municipality of Castilla–La Mancha. The municipality of Albacete is also the seventh-largest in Spain by total area, being 1,125.91 km^{2} (434.72 sq mi). Albacete is the seat to the regional High Court of Justice.

The origins of the city are uncertain, with the earliest proof of settlement dating to the time of Al-Andalus, when the settlement was originally named البسيط (Al-Basīṭ), meaning "The Flat" in Arabic, referring to the flat land around. Albacete was the main headquarters of the International Brigades during the Spanish Civil War.

Part of the historic region of La Mancha, Albacete has a reputation as a producer of clasp knives. Its flat area and the removal of architectural barriers have reportedly made it one of the most accessible cities across the country.

Among the several festivals celebrated in the city, the September Feria de Albacete stands out, declared as a Fiesta of International Tourist Interest.

Albacete is home to multinational corporations like the Albacete Airport and has five large industrial zones, including Campollano, the largest industrial area of Castilla–La Mancha. Albacete houses one of the campus of the University of Castilla–La Mancha, the Biomedical Campus of Albacete and the Technology Park of Albacete.

The aviation industry is one of the main economic engines of the city. Albacete hosts the School of TLP NATO pilots, Los Llanos Air Base.

== Name ==
The name Albacete is derived from the Andalusian name for the area, the city having been originally called البسيط (Al-Basīṭ) in Arabic, which translates to "the plain" in reference to the plateau that characterizes the geography of the area.

Pascual Madoz in his famous Diccionario geográfico-estadístico-histórico de España y sus posesiones de Ultramar (Geographical-historical-statistical Dictionary of Spain and its overseas territories) indicates that two hypotheses about the toponym of Albacete are probable. In the first place he highlights the proposal suggested by Bernardo Espinalt y Garcia, who believes that the city was founded by the Cilicians, who called it Celtide relying on Liutprand of Cremona, "in Hispaniam venientes Celtide vocaverunt hunc locum, quem vocan Albacene corrupte mauri (in Spain this place is called Celtide, which the Moors called Albacene incorrectly)". The second hypothesis states that its origin may be the Alaba of the Celtiberians, mentioned by Pliny the Elder and by Ptolemy, which could result in Alba civitas ("White city"), which later became Albacete.

The most common adjective used to refer to the inhabitants of Albacete is albacetense, or albaceteño/a, without prejudice to the demonyms used for the inhabitants of the various population centers that make up the area such as the aguanueveros (inhabitants of Agua Nuevo) or colonos for the neighboring Aguas Nuevas (among others).

== History ==
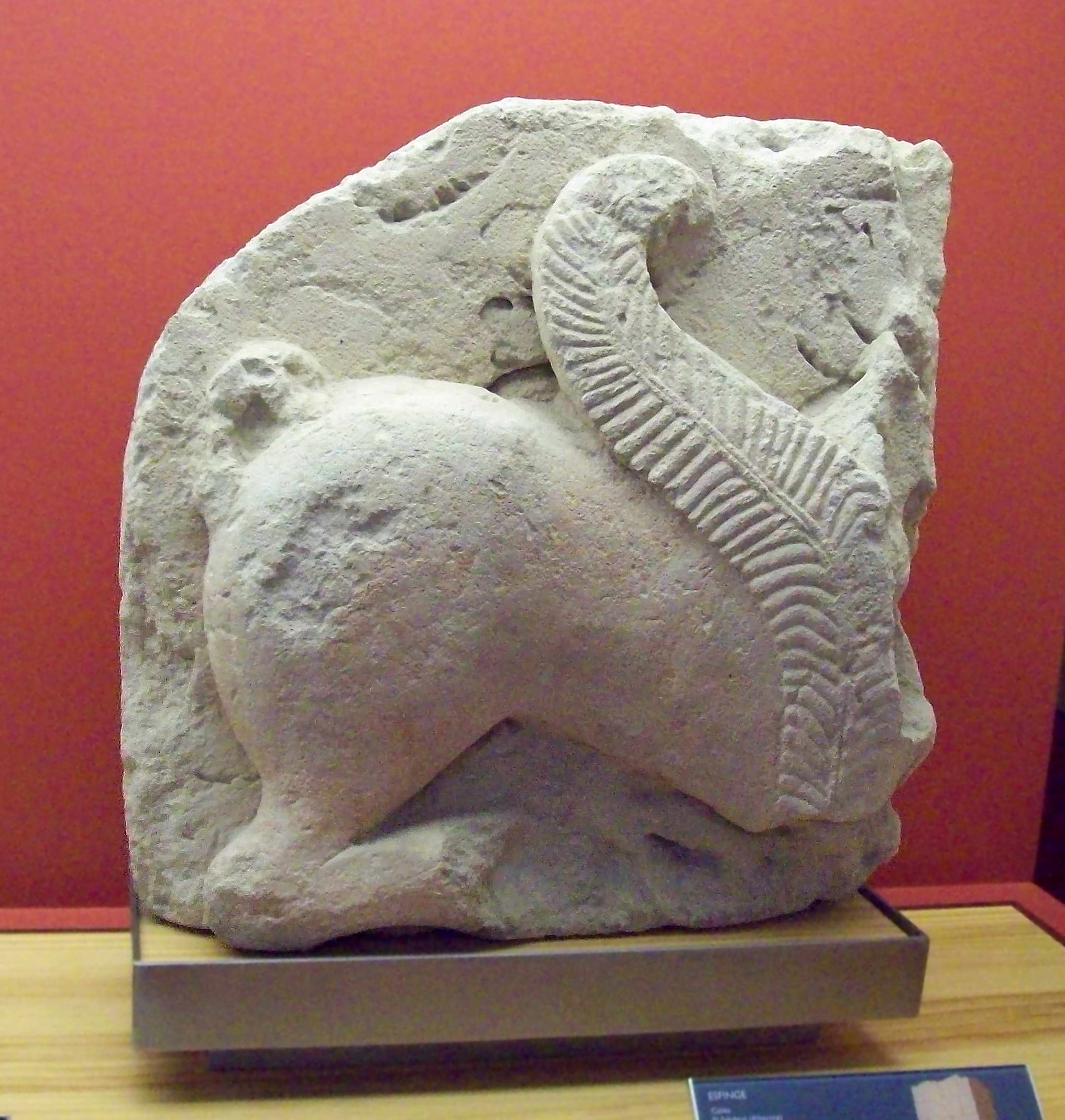
One of the twin Sphinxes of El Salobral, two Iberian sculptures found within the municipal limits.

The origins of the city are uncertain, although the first few confirmations of its existence are found during the Moorish domination of the area, when it was a small Moorish village. Its name is derived from the Arabic البسيط Al-Basīṭ, "El Llano" ("the plain") referring to the planiform nature of the geography of the area.

The battle of Albacete, at which the Emir Zafadola was killed, was fought near Albacete in 1146.

In 1240, Albacete capitulated to Ferdinand III, who had support from the Order of Santiago and knights from the land of Alarcón. Soon after, in 1241, in return for help provided, the monarch donated the place to Alarcón. The hamlet of Albacete was transferred from Alarcón to Chinchilla by Alfonso X in 1269.

Albacete was granted the privilege of town (villa) in 1375 by Don Juan Manuel, prince of Villena, becoming independent from Chinchilla and granted a fuero in that time. A century later, in 1476, the Catholic Monarchs rewarded Albacete for supporting the Crown by granting it a licence to hold a market once a week.

During the Revolt of the Comuneros (1520–22), after initial protests, Albacete supported the new emperor Charles V, who in 1526 granted the feudal estate of the town to his wife, the Empress Isabella of Portugal. During this period, construction started on the church of San Juan Bautista (St John the Baptist), which was later to become a cathedral.

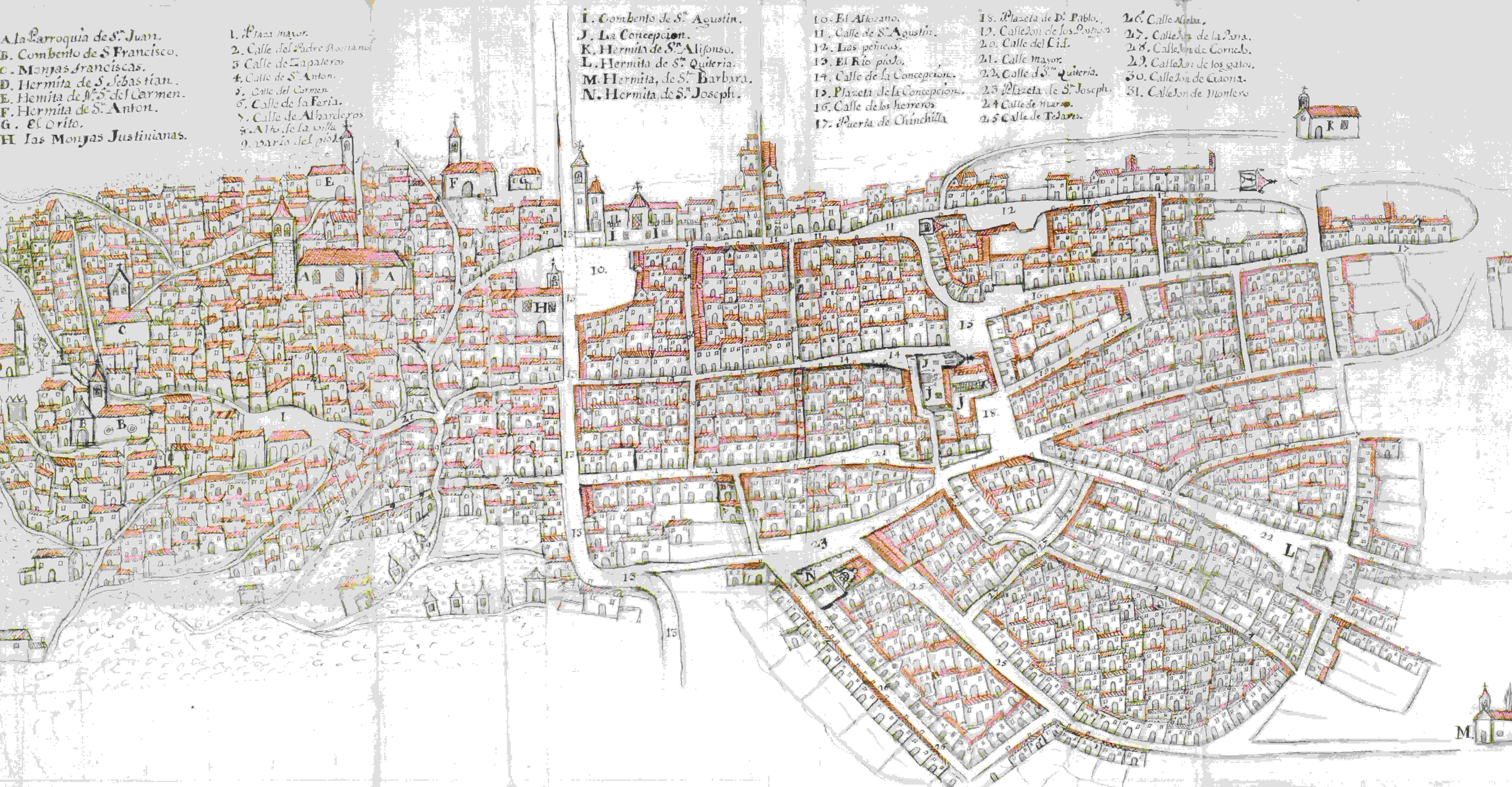
Albacete in the 18th century.

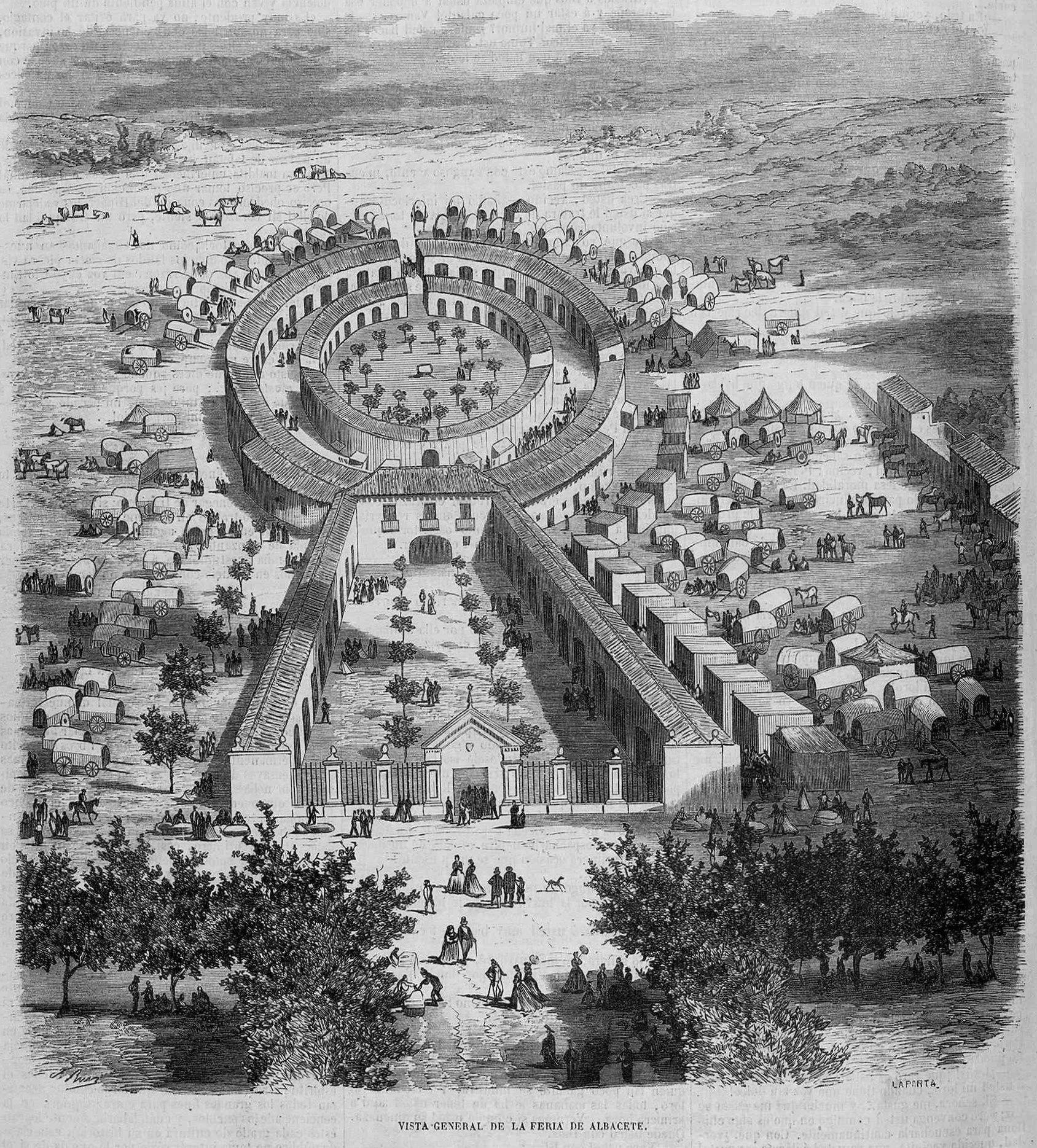
The Fair of Albacete in the mid-19th century.

Albacete is located in a strategic position between Madrid and the east coast of Spain and its agricultural wealth led to the growth of the borough during the next few centuries until Philip V granted permission for an annual fair (1710). This fair was later held in an enclosure built by Charles III (1783).

In the early 19th century, in the context of the discussion for the creation of a new province upon territory belonging to New Castile and Murcia, Albacete vied for the capital status of the intended demarcation against nearby Chinchilla. They had a similar population at the time, although Albacete probably had the edge in economic prowess. Chinchilla briefly became head of province during the trienio liberal before the absolutist crackdown of Ferdinand VII, but the definitive 1833 territorial division devised by Javier de Burgos established Albacete as capital of the new province of Albacete.

Soon after, in 1834, an Audiencia Territorial (a regional court) was established in Albacete, exercising jurisdiction over a demarcation comprising the provinces of Ciudad Real, Cuenca, Murcia and Albacete.

Railway reached Albacete on 18 March 1855, as the Alcázar de San Juan–Albacete stretch of the Madrid–Almansa line was opened on that day. Albacete was granted the title of city (ciudad) through a Royal Decree issued in November 1862, during the reign of Isabella II. Following the opening of the Chinchilla–Cartagena railway in 1865, Albacete also became connected to the latter city.

Social inequality in the 19th century was rampant, with overwhelming rates of illiteracy in areas dwelled by day laborers. Meanwhile, the "middle class" consisted chiefly of civil servants and lawyers (thanks to hosting the seat of the Audiencia) as well a reduced number of merchants. Street electric lighting was inaugurated in 1888, thus being the first capital of a province in Spain with electric lighting in its streets.

Throughout the 19th century, the population of the town doubled from the 10,000 inhabitants at the beginning of the century to around 21,000 by the beginning of the 20th century. During this period, Albacete defended Queen Isabel II against the Carlists (the supporters of Charles, the pretender to the Spanish throne), supported Espartero and, just like other Spanish cities, constituted a revolutionary junta. During the long period of the Restoration (1875–1923), symptoms of caciquismo (the network of social relations based on clientelism underpinning the political life in the rural areas) became pervasive in the political and social life of Albacete.

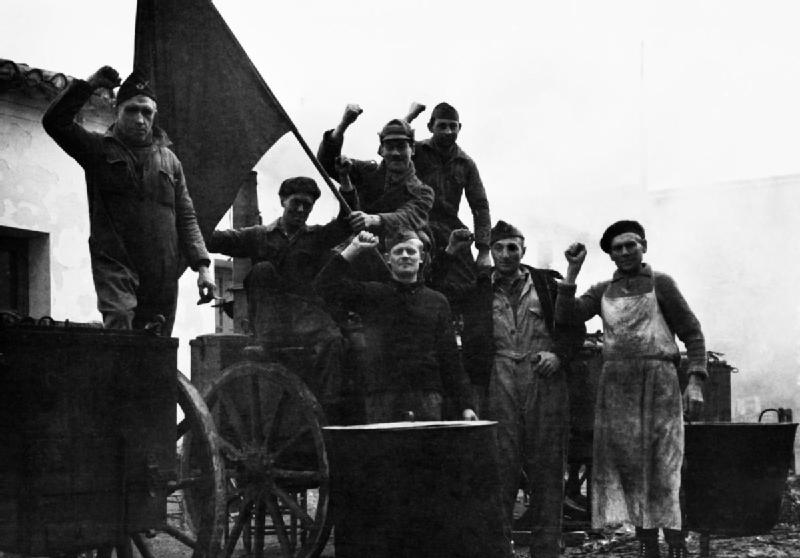
Members of the International Brigades in the British cookhouse at Albacete raising their fists (1936–37)

Between 1900 and the end of the Spanish Civil War (1939), the population tripled. A number of basic public works date back to that time: the water supply and sewer system (1905), the Abelardo Sanchez Park (1910–23), Tesifonte Gallego Street and the industrial area of the town.

During the Spanish Civil War (1936–39), after a brief lapse in the power of the troops who had rebelled against the Republican government, the town fell back into the hands of Madrid. For most of the war, the airbase at Los Llanos was the main headquarters of the Republican air force. It was also the headquarters of the International Brigades (supporters of the Republican cause from other countries who fought in the Spanish Civil war) and a monument has been built recently to commemorate the sixty years' anniversary of those events. The first volume of Peter Weiss' novel The Aesthetics of Resistance is located in Albacete's Civil War days hospital "Cueva La Potita".

In the time of the transition to democracy, the two most significant events were the establishment in Albacete in 1982 of the High Court of Justice of Castilla–La Mancha, according to article 23 of the Statute of Autonomy of the Community. Casa de Quevedo, and the consolidation of the University, which brought new life to the town in 1985.

== Geography ==
=== Location ===
Albacete is located in the South-East of the Iberian Peninsula, in the plains of La Mancha (part of the Inner Plateau), at an elevation of about 686 metres (2,251 feet).

The surrounding region, the so-called Mancha de Albacete stands out for its horizontality. The municipality lies to a large extent on an endorheic area, prone to water-logging after heavy rains. In that sense, the urban nucleus was in fact an endemic focus of malaria until the Royal Canal of Albacete was built.

The local soil is low in organic matter and at risk, although slight, of erosion.

=== Climate ===
Albacete has a cold semi-arid climate (Köppen: BSk). Winters are cool while summers are hot. Winters and summers are usually dry. Because of the continental nature of the climate there is a large temperature variation during the year. Precipitation is low and mainly concentrated in spring and autumn usually falling in the form of rain, but there is occasional snow.

Climate data for Albacete 674 m (2,211 ft) (1991–2020), extremes (1983-present)
Month	Jan	Feb	Mar	Apr	May	Jun	Jul	Aug	Sep	Oct	Nov	Dec	Year
Record high °C (°F)	22.8 (73.0)	24.2 (75.6)	31.2 (88.2)	32.8 (91.0)	37.9 (100.2)	40.4 (104.7)	42.0 (107.6)	42.7 (108.9)	39.8 (103.6)	33.0 (91.4)	28.8 (83.8)	21.9 (71.4)	42.7 (108.9)
Mean daily maximum °C (°F)	11.7 (53.1)	13.6 (56.5)	17.0 (62.6)	19.6 (67.3)	24.2 (75.6)	30.1 (86.2)	34.3 (93.7)	33.7 (92.7)	27.9 (82.2)	22.1 (71.8)	15.5 (59.9)	12.0 (53.6)	21.8 (71.3)
Daily mean °C (°F)	6.4 (43.5)	7.8 (46.0)	10.7 (51.3)	13.2 (55.8)	17.4 (63.3)	22.5 (72.5)	26.2 (79.2)	25.9 (78.6)	21.1 (70.0)	16.0 (60.8)	10.1 (50.2)	7.0 (44.6)	15.4 (59.7)
Mean daily minimum °C (°F)	1.0 (33.8)	1.9 (35.4)	4.4 (39.9)	6.8 (44.2)	10.5 (50.9)	14.9 (58.8)	18.1 (64.6)	18.2 (64.8)	14.3 (57.7)	10.0 (50.0)	4.7 (40.5)	2.0 (35.6)	8.9 (48.0)
Record low °C (°F)	−16.2 (2.8)	−19.0 (−2.2)	−6.6 (20.1)	−3.2 (26.2)	−0.6 (30.9)	4.3 (39.7)	9.2 (48.6)	9.2 (48.6)	4.7 (40.5)	−0.4 (31.3)	−5.4 (22.3)	−9.2 (15.4)	−19.0 (−2.2)
Average precipitation mm (inches)	22.4 (0.88)	24.1 (0.95)	37.7 (1.48)	41.7 (1.64)	40.1 (1.58)	30.6 (1.20)	7.7 (0.30)	13.4 (0.53)	37.2 (1.46)	39.4 (1.55)	35.9 (1.41)	30.6 (1.20)	360.8 (14.18)
Average precipitation days (≥ 1 mm)	4.4	4.0	5.3	6.2	5.7	2.9	0.9	1.8	4.0	5.6	5.5	4.8	51.1
Average snowy days	0.9	1.0	0.4	0.1	0	0	0	0	0	0	0.3	0.6	3.3
Average relative humidity (%)	73	66	62	59	54	47	44	48	56	64	72	75	60
Source: Agencia Estatal de Meteorologia

Climate data for Albacete Base Area 702 m (2,303 ft) (1991–2020), extremes (1939-present)
Month	Jan	Feb	Mar	Apr	May	Jun	Jul	Aug	Sep	Oct	Nov	Dec	Year
Record high °C (°F)	22.8 (73.0)	25.4 (77.7)	30.0 (86.0)	33.1 (91.6)	36.7 (98.1)	41.0 (105.8)	42.9 (109.2)	43.3 (109.9)	39.7 (103.5)	33.6 (92.5)	29.0 (84.2)	21.1 (70.0)	43.3 (109.9)
Mean daily maximum °C (°F)	11.0 (51.8)	12.9 (55.2)	16.4 (61.5)	19.0 (66.2)	23.6 (74.5)	29.6 (85.3)	33.7 (92.7)	33.0 (91.4)	27.1 (80.8)	21.3 (70.3)	14.7 (58.5)	11.4 (52.5)	21.1 (70.1)
Daily mean °C (°F)	5.5 (41.9)	7.0 (44.6)	10.0 (50.0)	12.5 (54.5)	16.7 (62.1)	21.9 (71.4)	25.5 (77.9)	25.2 (77.4)	20.4 (68.7)	15.3 (59.5)	9.4 (48.9)	6.3 (43.3)	14.6 (58.4)
Mean daily minimum °C (°F)	0.1 (32.2)	1.0 (33.8)	3.5 (38.3)	6.0 (42.8)	9.8 (49.6)	14.1 (57.4)	17.3 (63.1)	17.4 (63.3)	13.6 (56.5)	9.2 (48.6)	4.0 (39.2)	1.2 (34.2)	8.1 (46.6)
Record low °C (°F)	−24.0 (−11.2)	−22.5 (−8.5)	−10.4 (13.3)	−5.4 (22.3)	−1.0 (30.2)	3.0 (37.4)	7.5 (45.5)	5.0 (41.0)	1.0 (33.8)	−6.3 (20.7)	−8.4 (16.9)	−18.8 (−1.8)	−24.0 (−11.2)
Average precipitation mm (inches)	21.8 (0.86)	24.9 (0.98)	35.6 (1.40)	38.0 (1.50)	40.6 (1.60)	30.9 (1.22)	8.0 (0.31)	13.8 (0.54)	38.4 (1.51)	39.0 (1.54)	34.6 (1.36)	29.8 (1.17)	355.4 (13.99)
Average precipitation days (≥ 1 mm)	4.4	4.5	5.2	5.4	5.8	2.9	1.0	1.8	3.6	5.4	5.4	4.6	50
Average snowy days	1.0	1.2	0.6	0.1	0	0	0	0	0	0	0.4	0.6	3.9
Average relative humidity (%)	76	69	63	59	53	46	40	46	58	68	75	80	61
Mean monthly sunshine hours	161	181	226	249	285	327	366	335	264	211	162	146	2,913
Percentage possible sunshine	53	59	61	63	64	73	81	79	70	61	54	49	64
Source: Agencia Estatal de Meteorologia

== Government and administration ==
=== Justice administration ===
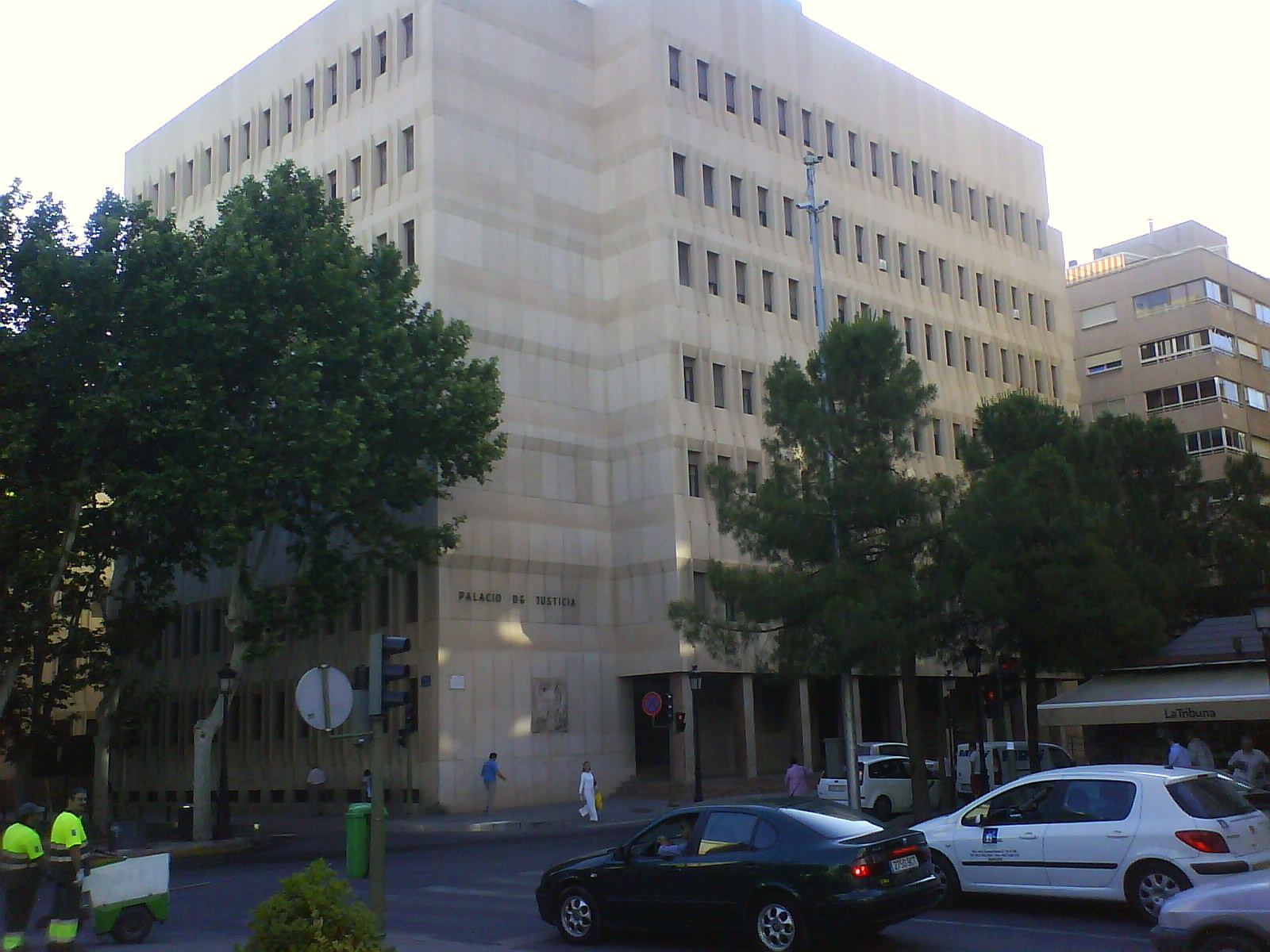
High Court of Justice of Castilla–La Mancha.

The town is home to the High Court of Justice of Castile-La Mancha (TSJCLM), the highest court of the autonomous region. The president of the Superior Court is Vicente Manuel Rouco Rodríguez, which is the highest representative of judiciary to Castilla–La Mancha. The High Court, established in 1989, based on the Palace of Justice in Albacete, is divided into three rooms: the Chamber of Civil and Criminal, the Board of Administrative Litigation and the Room social.

The city also hosts the Institute of Legal Medicine of Albacete, Cuenca and Guadalajara, whose scope corresponds to homonymous provinces. Moreover, the Manchego capital is the seat of Bar Council of Castilla–La Mancha and Notary Association of Castilla–La Mancha.

The long legal tradition of Albacete goes back to 1834, when the Territorial Court of Albacete (predecessor of the High Court), which extended its jurisdiction over the provinces of Albacete was created Ciudad Real and Cuenca and the Murcia.

The city also has a Provincial Court and head judicial district of Albacete, the judicial No. 1 province, whose demarcation comprises the city and over 15 municipalities, mainly of metropolitan area, which adds a Dean.

The legal infrastructure is completed by two courts Administrative Litigation three trial courts, juvenile court, one for violence against women, three of Criminal Seven of First Instance, three social courts. In this sense we must bear in mind that the Autonomous Community of Castilla–La Mancha does not exercise the powers in justice. All courts of the city unless the Superior Court of Castilla–La Mancha will be based in the new City of Justice in Albacete.

In addition, on the outskirts of the city is the Albacete Prison, known as The Prison Torrecica, established in 1981, and the Center for Children Albaidel, born in 1993.

== Demographics ==
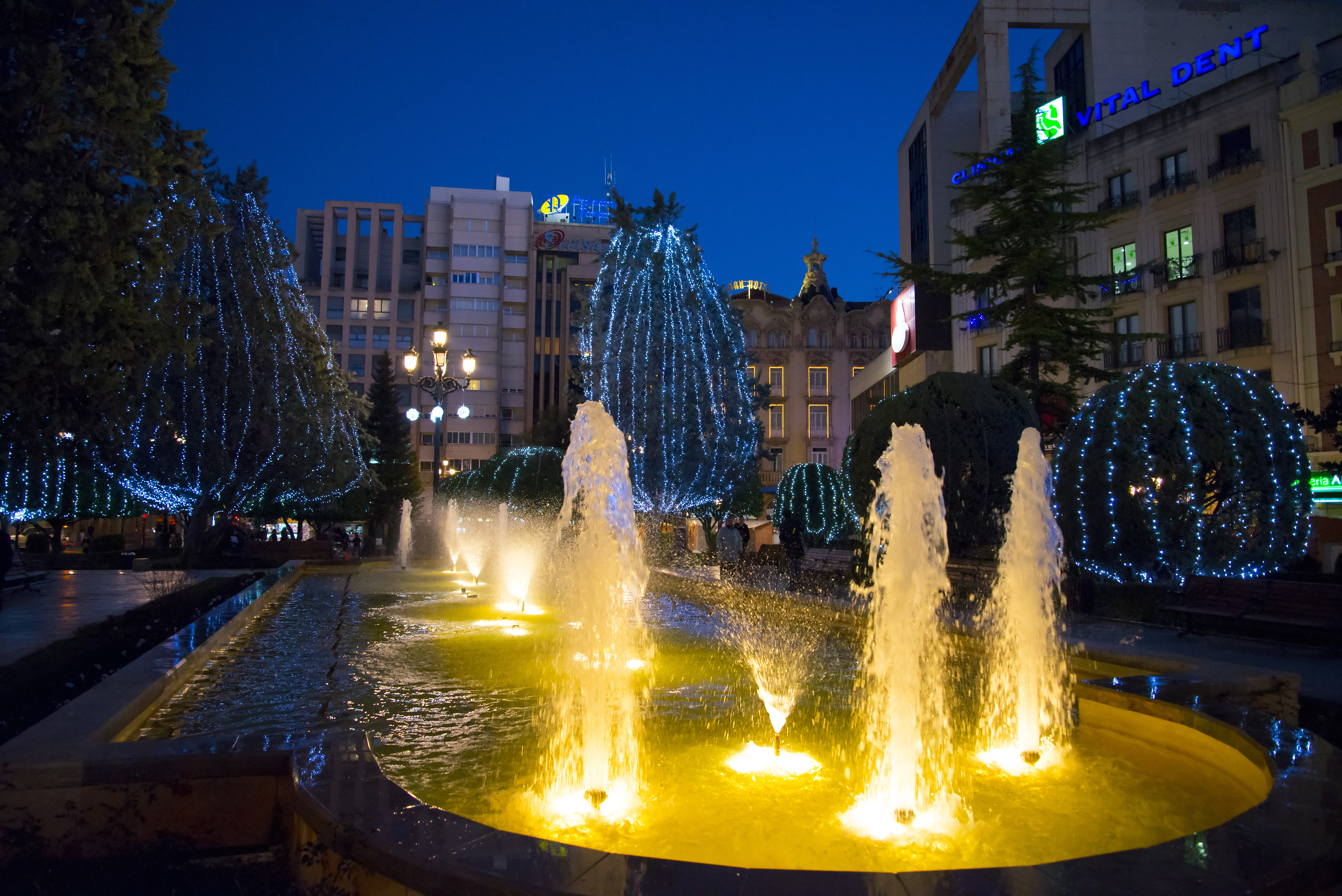
Albacete is, broadly, the largest city in Castilla–La Mancha.

With 173,329 inhabitants as of 1 January 2019, according to data from the INE, Albacete is the most populous city in the autonomous community of Castilla–La Mancha, the city with the highest number of people in the South Submeseta after Madrid and one of the inner cities most populated Spain.

Demographic trends drawn historically sustained growth slowed somewhat in the 1950s, and very strong in recent years (+71% between 1970 and 2005, and 13% between 2000 and 2008). In 1999 there was segregation and subsequent emancipation of Pozo Cañada of the municipality of Albacete, establishing itself as an independent municipality.

Of the total 172,487 people surveyed in 2014, 10,851 were foreign nationals, representing 6.3% of the total. These immigrants come from all continents, the most numerous colonies of Romanian nationality (1,743), Bolivia (1,207), Morocco (1,074) and Colombia (974).

According to the Gazetteer of 2013, the municipality in addition to the capital city-the city of Albacete it includes a smaller local organization (Aguas Nuevas) and sixteen rural areas (The Salobral, Santa Ana, Bacariza, Argamasón, Tinajeros, Campillo of Doblas, The Anguijes, Abuzaderas, Cerrolobo, Casa de las Monjas, House Captain, Great House, Los Llanos, The Pulgosa, The Torrecica and Villar de Pozo Rubio).

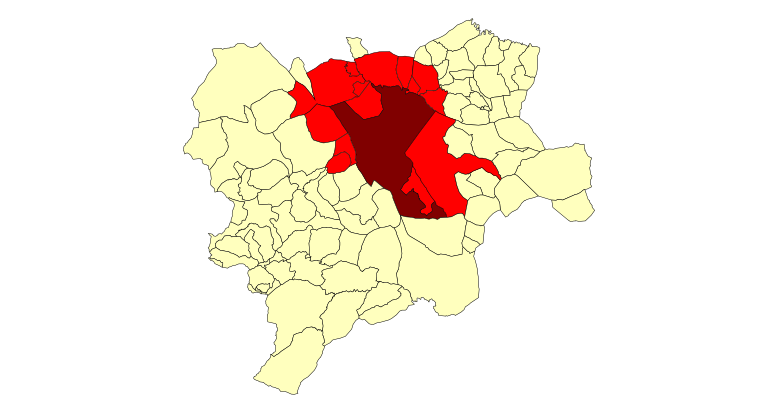
Extension Albacete metropolitan area for the Province.

For some years it is producing a demographic phenomenon around the city of Albacete, called Metropolitan area attraction which currently encompasses a population of 219 121 inhabitants between the city and nearby, and with strong growth stocks, whose projections for 2020 estimate that exceeds 300 000, because it is one of the areas with the highest growth projection and expansion throughout the southeast Spanish.

The metropolitan area of Albacete consists of Albacete and fourteen other near the capital municipalities: La Roda, Tarazona de la Mancha, Burrows, Chinchilla de Monte-Aragon, Pozo Cañada, La Gineta, Balazote, Barrax, Valdeganga, Mahora, Motilleja, Fuensanta, La Herrera and Montalvos.

The demonym used to describe the inhabitants of the town of Albacete is albaceteño, -ña or albacetense.

== Economy ==
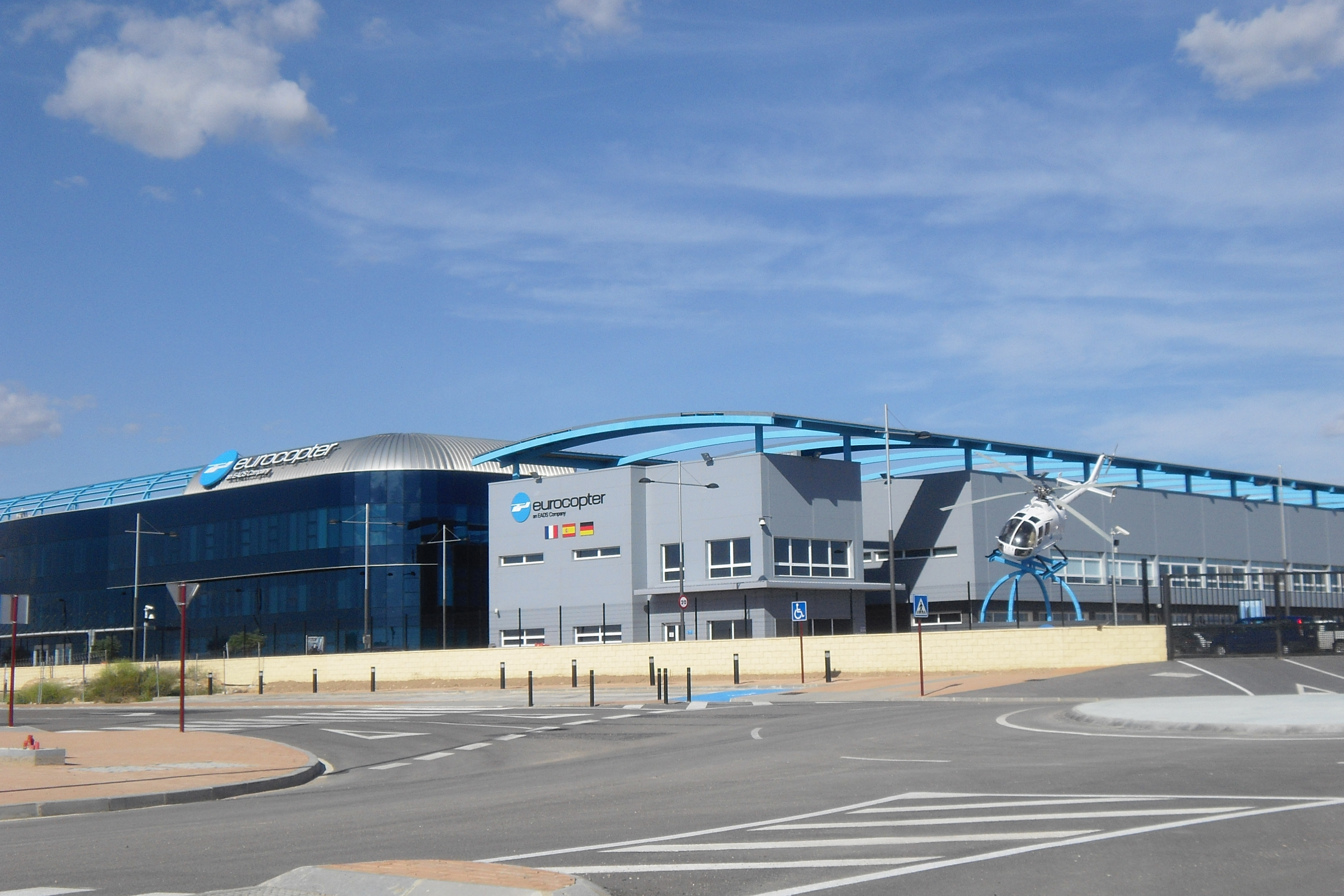
Airbus Helicopters has its headquarters in Spain at the Air and Logistic Park (Albacete helicopter plant) of Albacete.

Albacete is the premier economic driver of Castilla–La Mancha. The city currently bases its economy on the trade and services sector, being head of an extensive sales area of over 556,723 people from 154 municipalities scattered throughout the provinces of Albacete, Cuenca, Ciudad Real, Jaén, Alicante, Valencia and Murcia.

The city of Albacete has extensive industrial areas like the Business Park Campollano or Industrial Estate Romica, and also industrial estates in the Automotive (Ajusa Business Park), the Aeronautics and Logistics Park of Albacete and the Science and Technology Park. There are additionally several parks nearby towns in the metropolitan area.

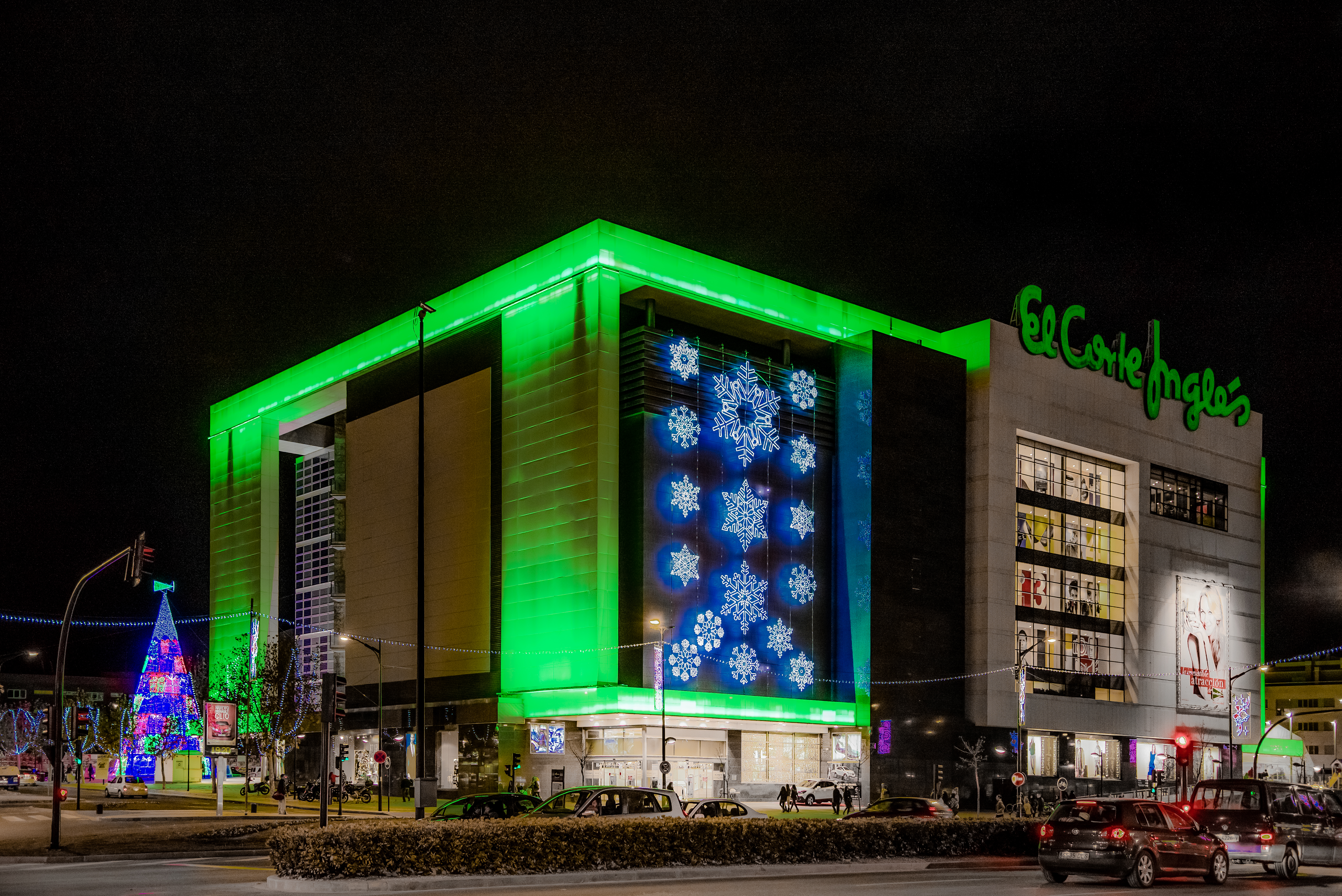
El Corte Inglés of the Avenue of Spain.

Commercial activity is very important for the city and Albacete is the commercial capital of Castilla–La Mancha. Albacete has a long history as a city of business from the first half of the fourteenth century, partly through its agricultural and farming fair which became a meeting point for people of the southeast Spanish. Its geographical location and its good connections, coupled with the entrepreneurial character of its inhabitants have increased this capacity. It has a large and interesting exhibition calendar (Trade Fair of Albacete, IFAB) and a modern Congress Hall.

== Education ==
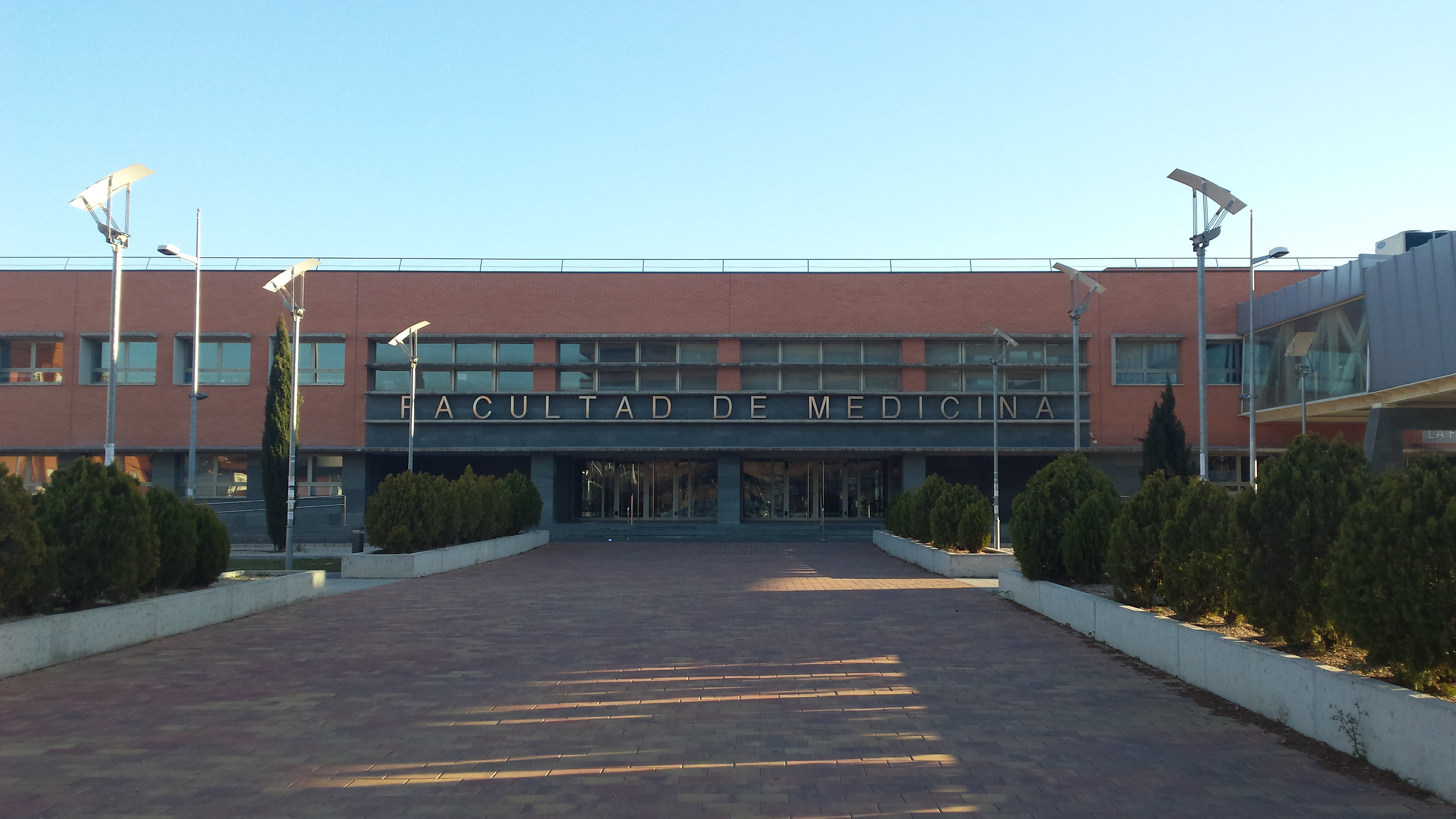
The Faculty of Medicine of Albacete, located in the Biomedical Campus.

The city of Albacete facility has three universities, which offer a total of 41 different degrees:

- University of Castilla–La Mancha
- National University of Distance Education
- Ecclesiastical San Damaso University

Albacete hosts the Superior Conservatory of Music of Castilla–La Mancha, in which music is taught in degrees equivalent to university levels.

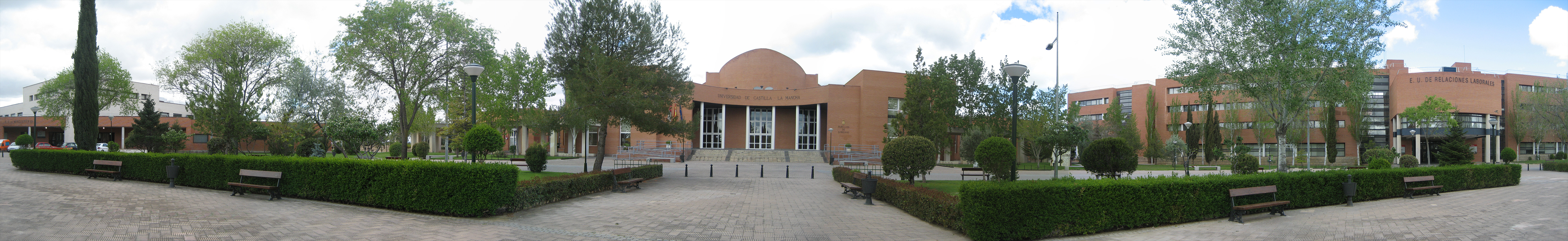
Panoramic view of the University Square of University of Castilla–La Mancha.

== Health ==
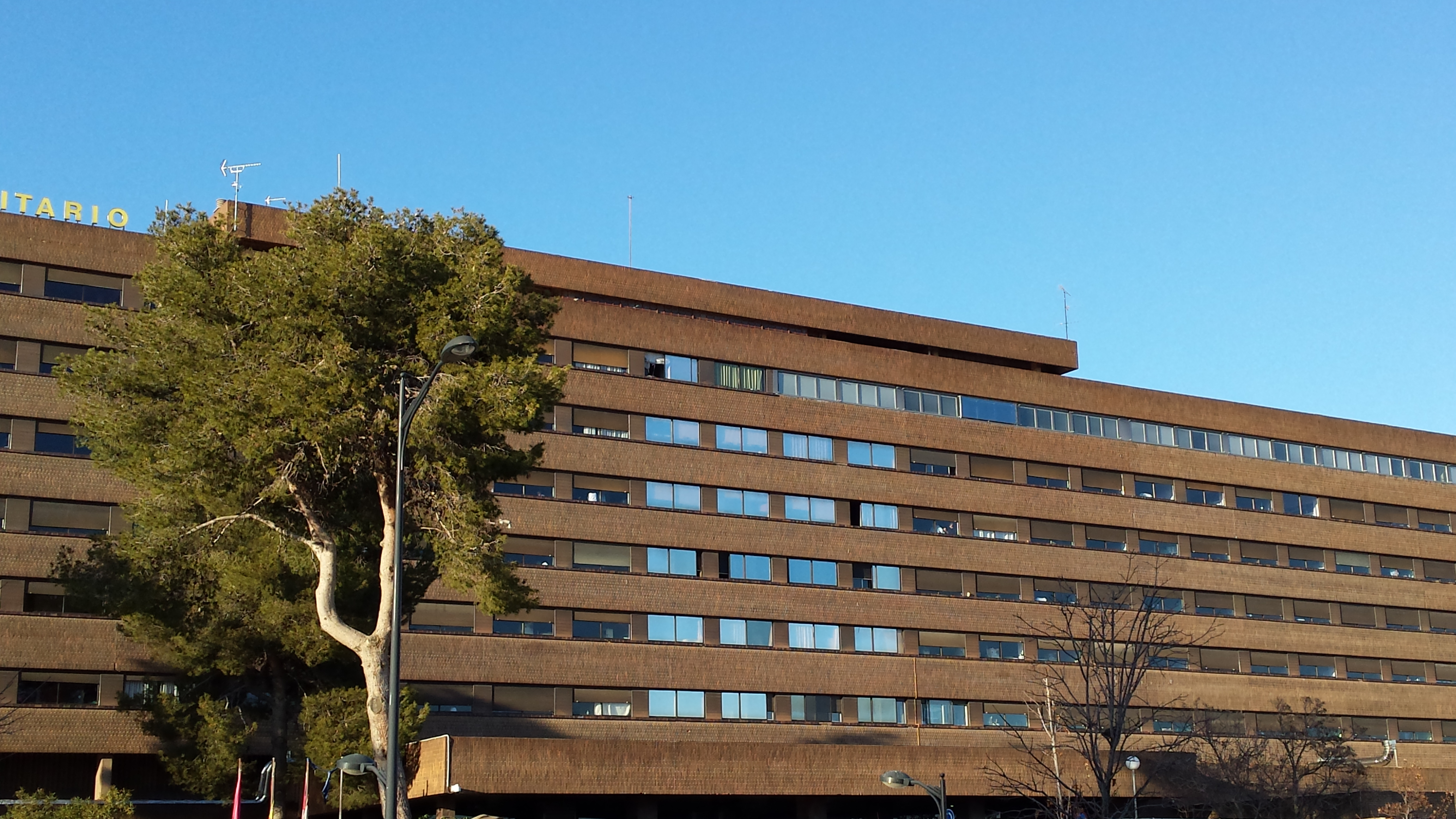
Hospital General Universitario de Albacete.

The public health system is managed by the regional Servicio de Salud de Castilla-La Mancha (SESCAM), which reports functionally to the health department of the Regional Government of Castile-La Mancha.

The hospital network is basically composed of public hospitals managed by the SESCAM and other hospital privately run medical centers: Hospital General Universitario de Albacete, Hospital Universitario del Perpetuo Socorro de Albacete, Centro de Atención a la Salud Mental de Albacete, Hospital Quirónsalud Santa Cristina (privately run), Clínica Nuestra Señora del Rosario (privately run), IDCsalud Hospital Albacete (privately run) and Centro Sociosanitario Vital Parque (privately run).

== Military facilities ==
The city of Albacete is first order concerning military and defense facilities, housing important institutions nationally and internationally as the Pilot School TLP NATO, Los Llanos Air Base, 14 Wing's or Air Arsenal Albacete, generating thousands of jobs directly and indirectly. Also, very close to it is situated the National Training Center Chinchilla, linked to the city.

=== School TLP NATO pilots ===
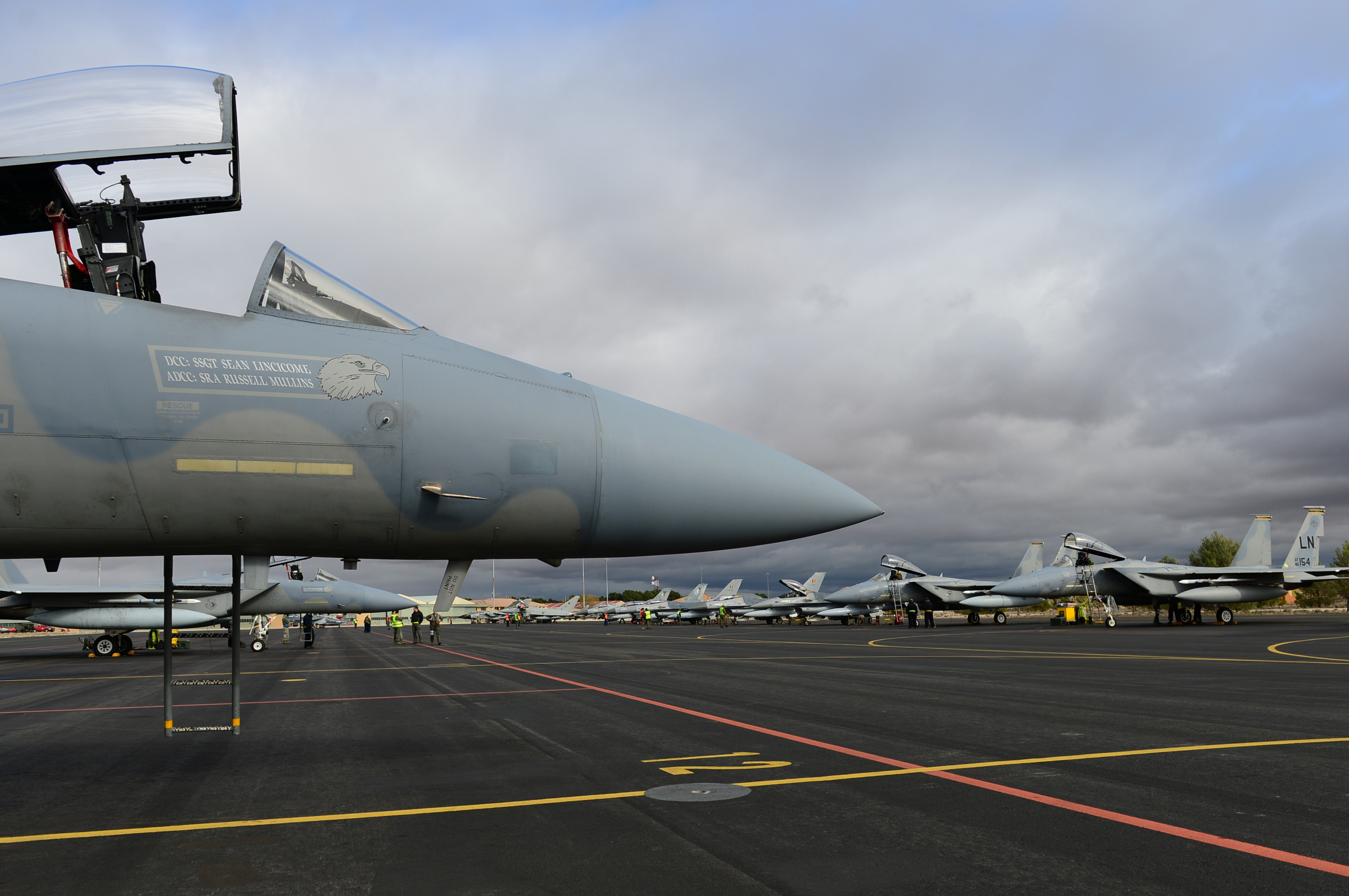
Aircraft Air Force F-15C US in TLP, based in Albacete.

The TLP (Tactical Leadership Programme officially) is an international center for advanced training for pilots and crews in order to improve the operability and effectiveness of Allied Air Forces. In addition to the workshops flight (both day and night), theoretical courses for staff of the three armies of both countries outside NATO and the Alliance has also developed, and assists in the development of air doctrine. It has a permanent staff of over 100 people of all member countries and their courses involve the deployment of 3,000 troops a year in the city. It has received an investment of over 32 million in recent years in infrastructure and equipment in Albacete.

=== Los Llanos Air Base ===
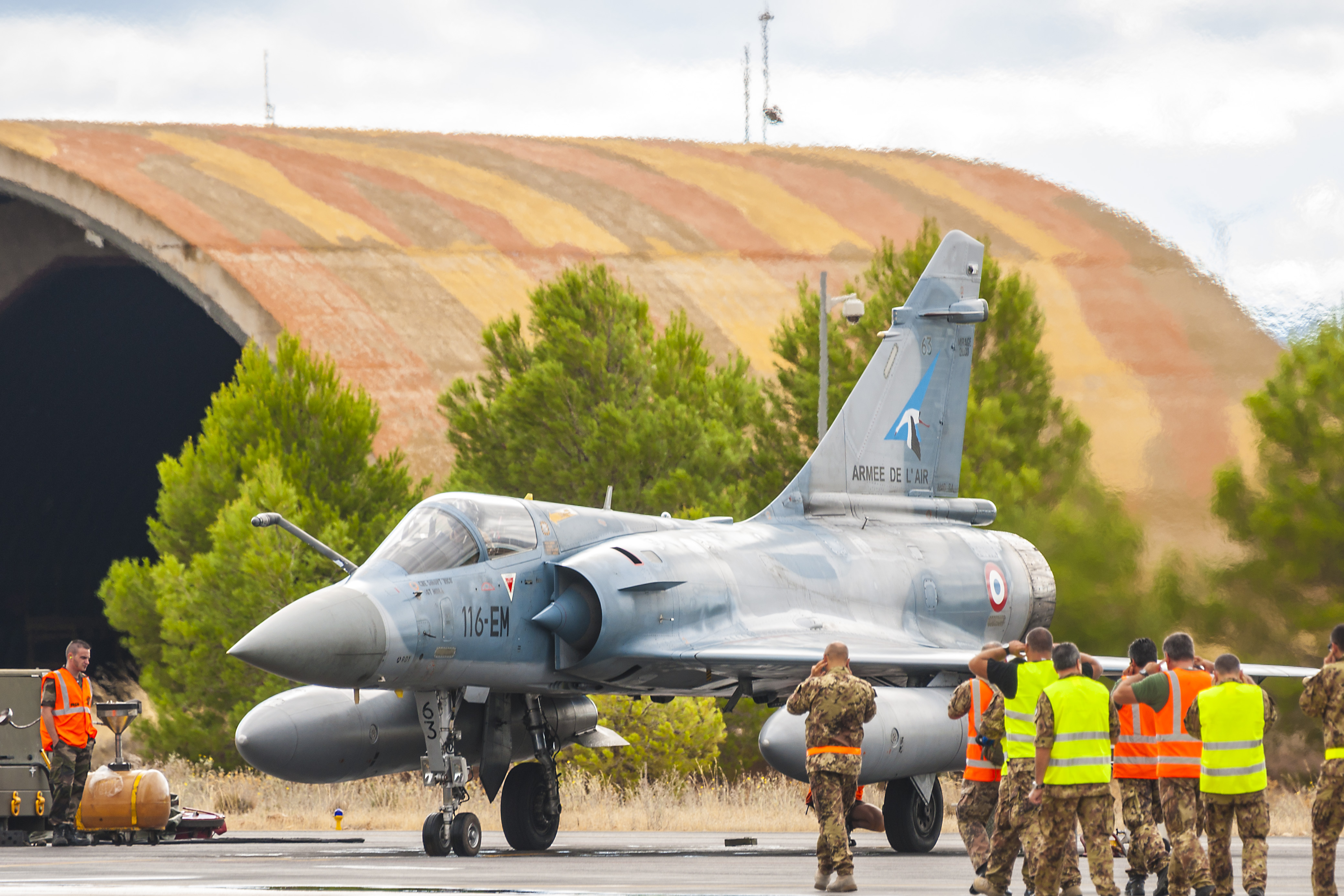
Mirage 2000-5F Army Air France next to a hangar of the Air Maestranza Albacete.

The Los Llanos Air Base of Los Llanos is a major air bases in Spain, which is deployed Wing 14 and the most advanced aircraft of the Air Force, like the Eurofighter Typhoon, one of the most advanced fighter aircraft in the world. It is a small town where they work more than 1000 people.

=== Wing 14 ===
Wing 14 is one of the military units of the Air Force of Spain. Equipped with, among others, the Eurofighter Typhoon combat aircraft, whose main function is carrying out air missions. It has two squadrons: 141 Squadron and 142 Squadron.

=== Air Maestranza Albacete ===
Albacete's Air Arsenal is the most important of Spain. Its mission is the maintenance of aircraft of the Air Force at the highest level. Its facilities occupy an area of over 470,000 square metres (5,059,038 square feet). It has more than 600 workers.

== Tourism and heritage ==
=== Architecture ===
==== Civil architecture ====
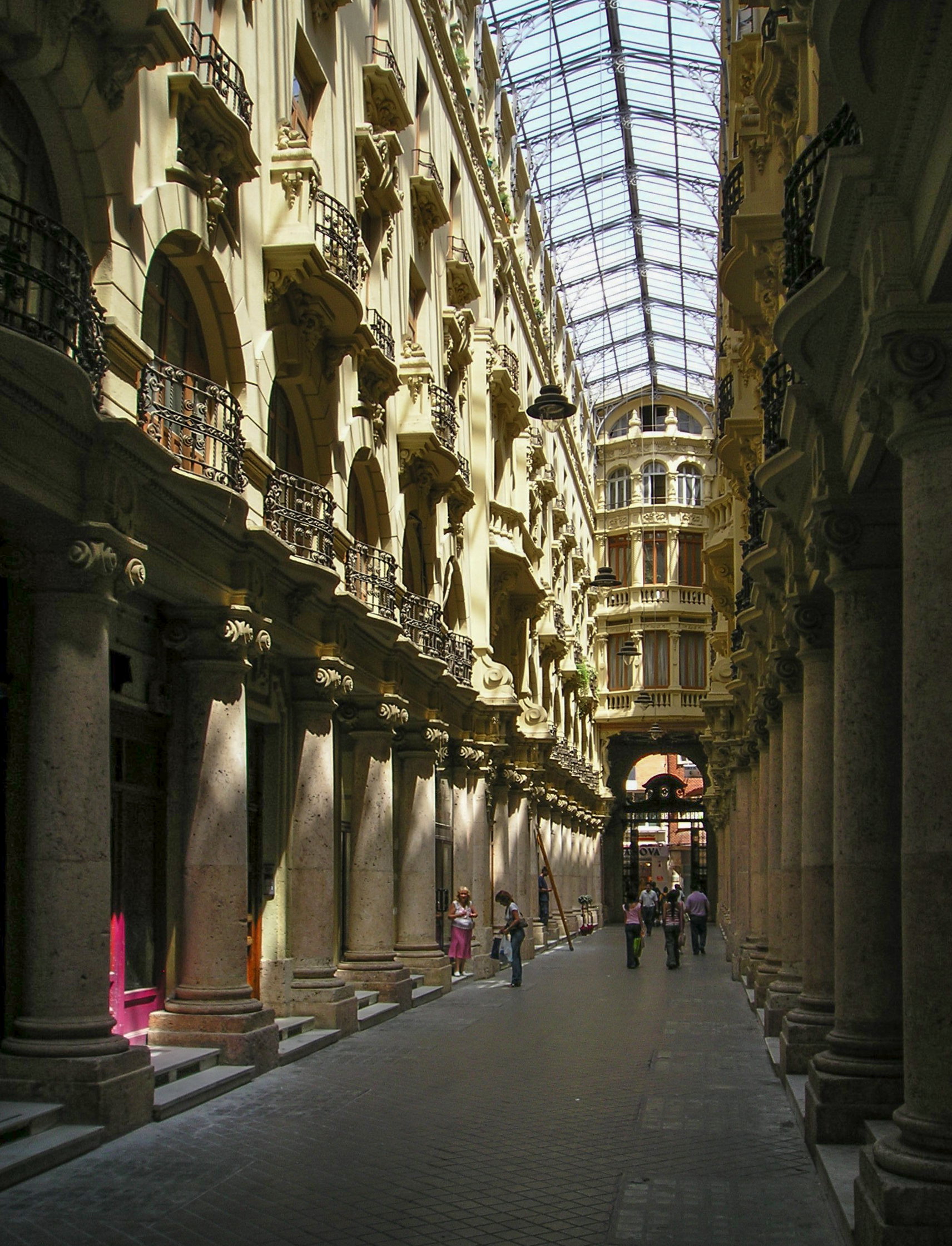
Interior Lodares Passage, historical modernist gallery of the first quarter of the twentieth century.

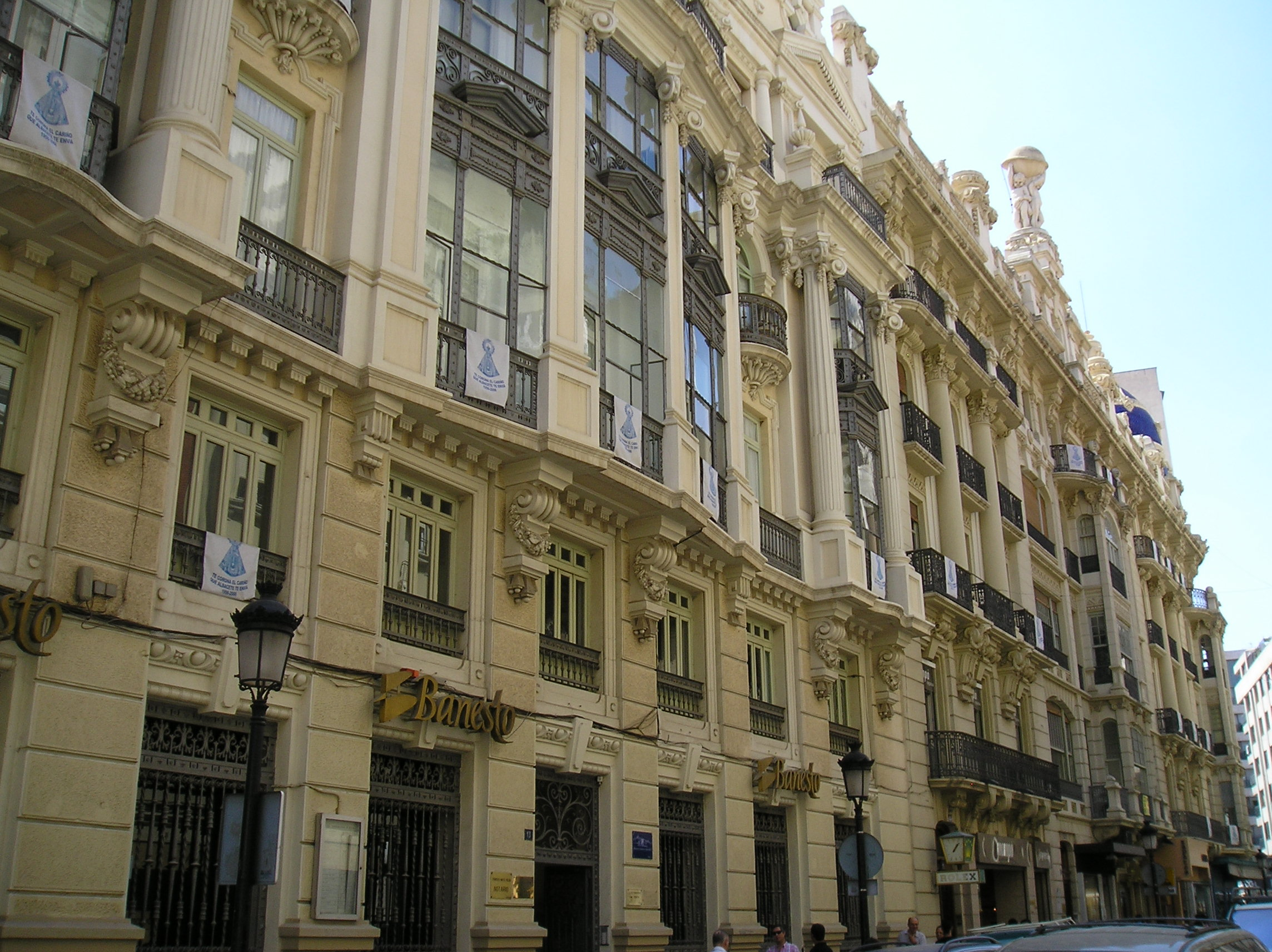
Casas Cabot in Marqués de Molins Street.

Albacete civil architectural heritage include the works carried out at the end of 19th century and early 20th centuries, as its status as capital of the province and the arrival of the railroad marked a turning point in the demographic and urban growth of the city.

But there were already some important buildings of its kind in the city among which is the Posada del Rosario (16th century), typical Manchego mansion where Gothic, Mudejar and Renaissance styles meet, and today has become office Tourism and university library, Perona House (s. XVII) today headquarters of the Delegation of Regional Government of Castilla–La Mancha, the fairgrounds, opened in 1783, and becomes the capital of La Mancha the only city in Spain with an exhibition dedicated to this purpose, and has undergone several expansions.

In the nineteenth century there will be a need to provide the city of administrativos and cultural buildings, why after 1880 the Palace of the Provincial de Albacete, the Circus (1887) Theatre will be created, one of the few examples dedicated to such functions worldwide, or Marlo House Building.

The result of the strength of the bourgeoisie albacetense early twentieth century, Modernist architectural movement will be making their mark in the center of the capital, erecting buildings like the Casa del Hortelano, built in 1912 and now houses the Museum of Cutlery. From this period also dates the old City Hall, now the Municipal Museum of Albacete, built in 1902.

Gradually raising emblematic buildings built in the twentieth century such as the Jubany Cabot House (1922), the Legorburo Building (1919), Hotel Regina (1919), Grand Hotel (1905), the flour mill (1916), the Sub Defense Building (1920), the Red Cross Building (1921), BBVA Building (1920), the Chamber of Notaries (1925), the Fontecha chalet (1925), the College of Architects (1925), the Former Commissioner Simon Abril (1929), the Pious Schools of Albacete (1930), the Casino Primitivo (1927), the building of the Bank of Spain (1936), the Union Building and the Phoenix (1960), the Hotel Los Llanos (1969), the Palace of Justice in Albacete (1980), the Government Pavilion Building or José Prat (1993) or the Cultural Center Eixample (1995), but without doubt the most recognized work in the city early century Gabriel Lodares Passage, a shopping arcade linking the Mayor and Dye streets (built in 1925), designed by Buenaventura Ferrando Castell, and together with the Pasaje Gutierrez of Valladolid, are the only two remaining examples in Spain such galleries.

Other prominent buildings of the twentieth century are the Bancaja building, the Banesto building, the Casa de Doña Filomena Flores or Montecasino.

21st century buildings such as El Corte Ingles, the station Albacete-Los Llanos, the Congress Palace, the Hotel Beatriz, the European Centre for Business Innovation Albacete, Hotel Santa Isabel, the House of Culture José Saramago, Airport Terminal Albacete, the Informatics Research Institute, the Center for Entrepreneurship, the Multipurpose Building of the University of Castilla–La Mancha or the Commissioner of the National Police.

==== Religious architecture ====
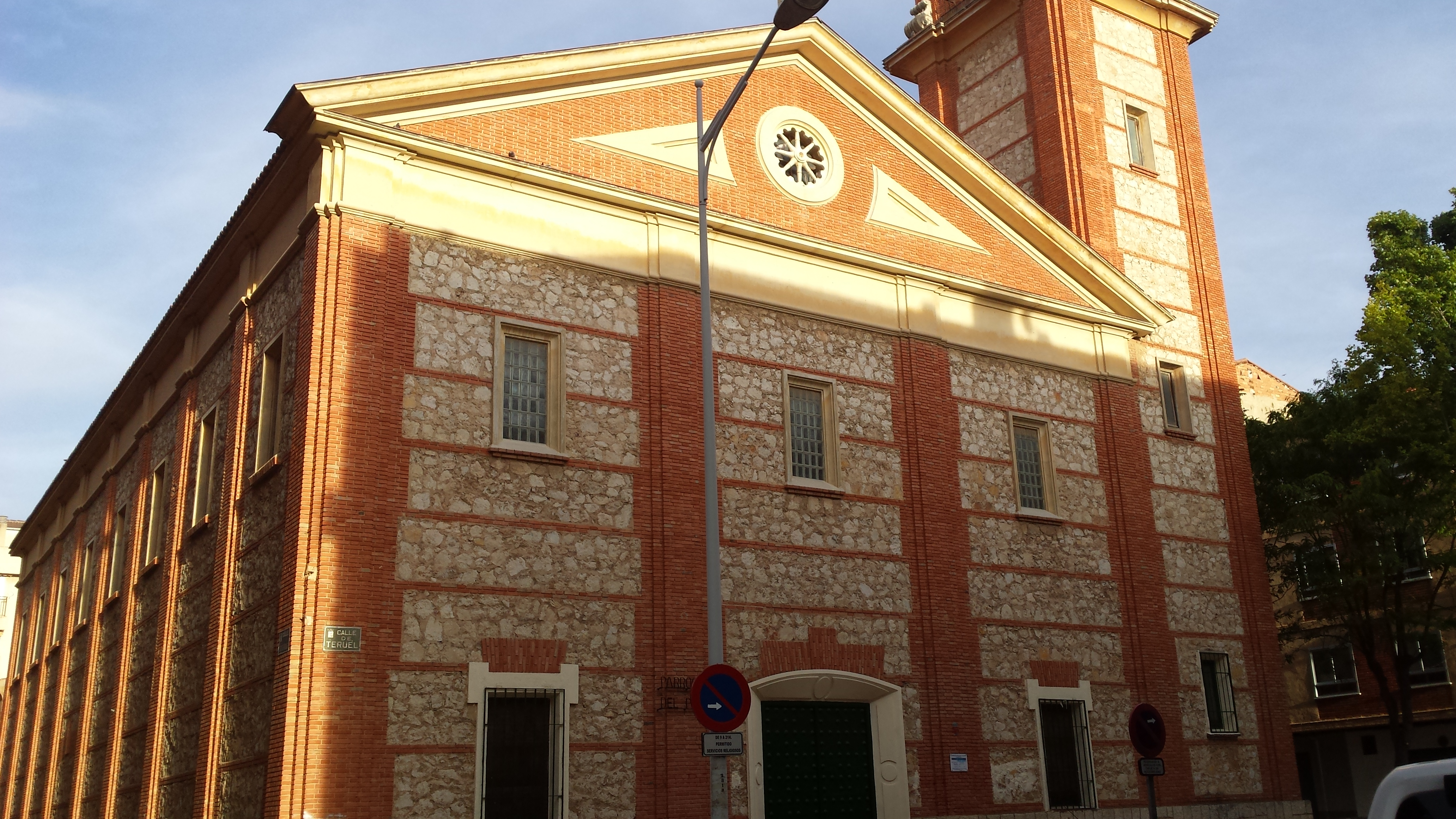
Church of Our Lady of Pilar.

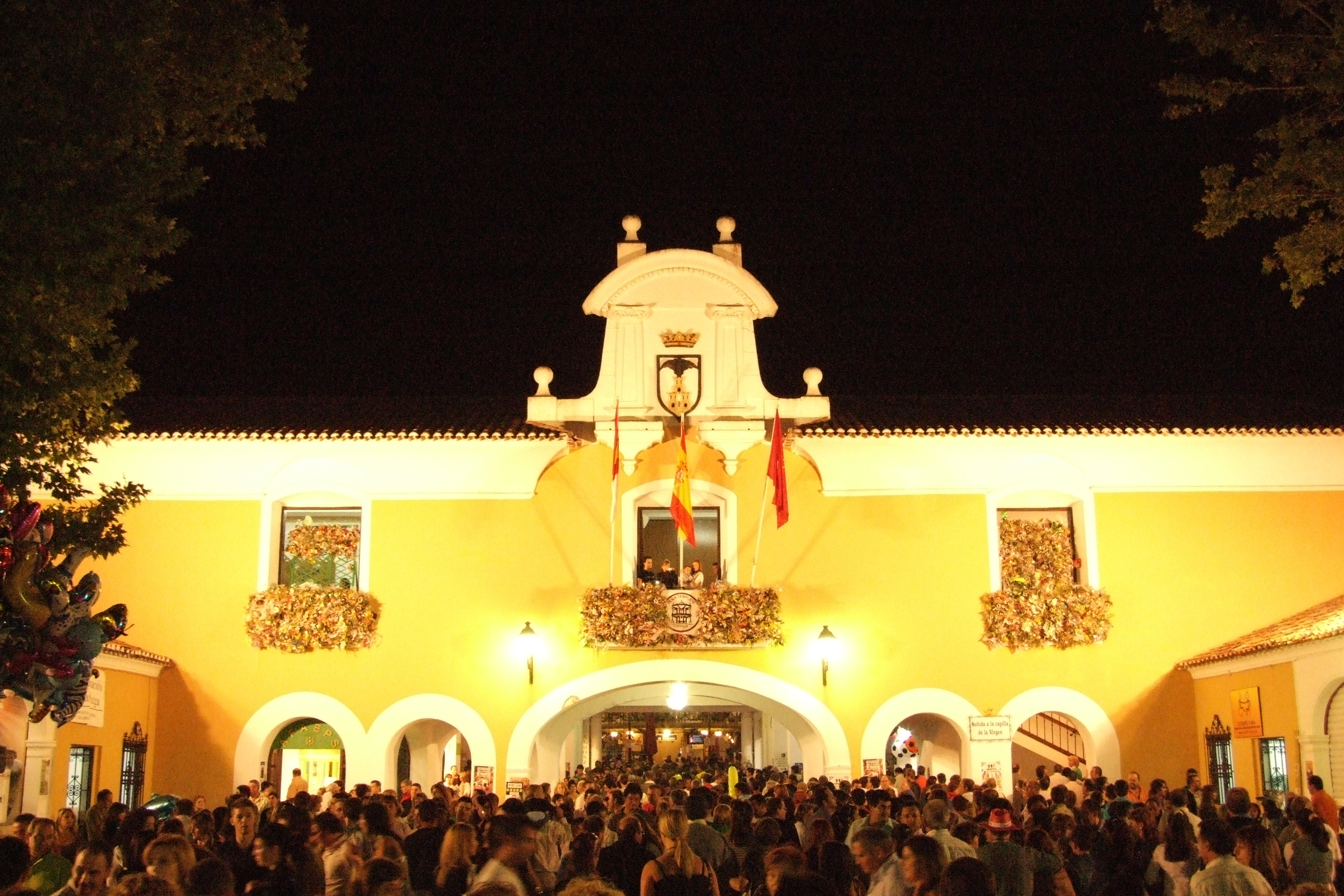
Chapel of the Virgen de Los Llanos.

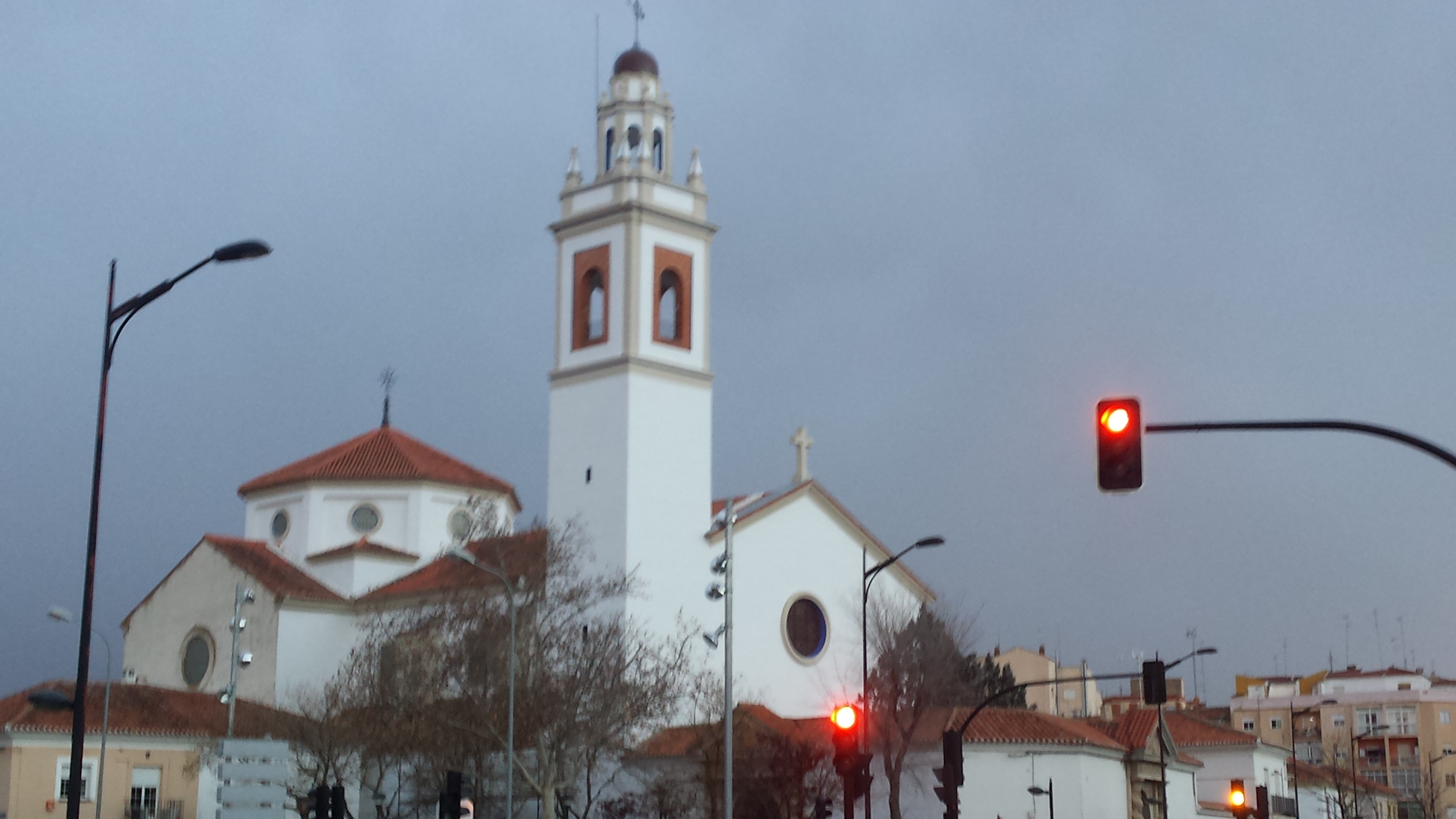
Church of Fatima.

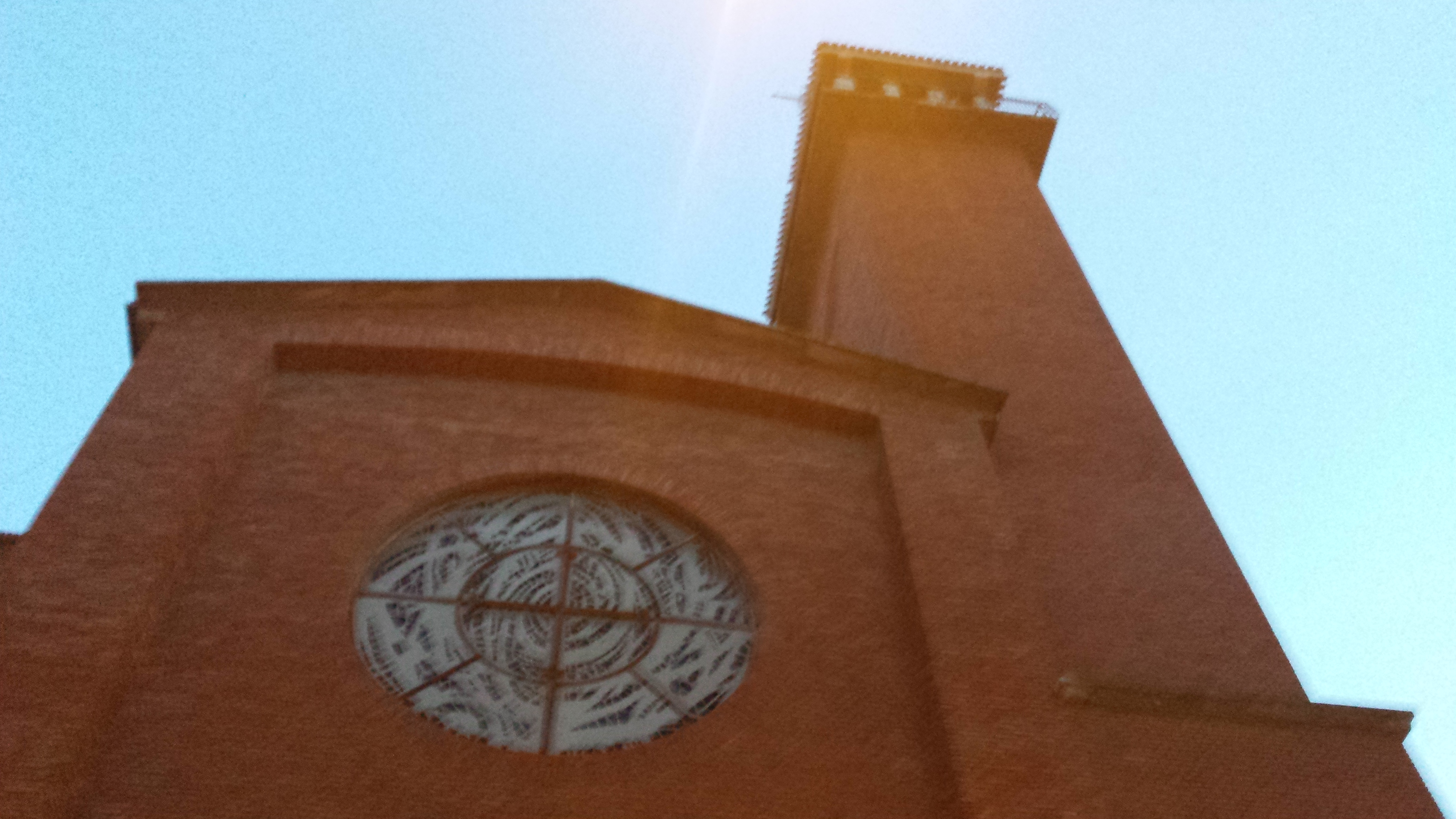
Church of St. Francis of Assisi.

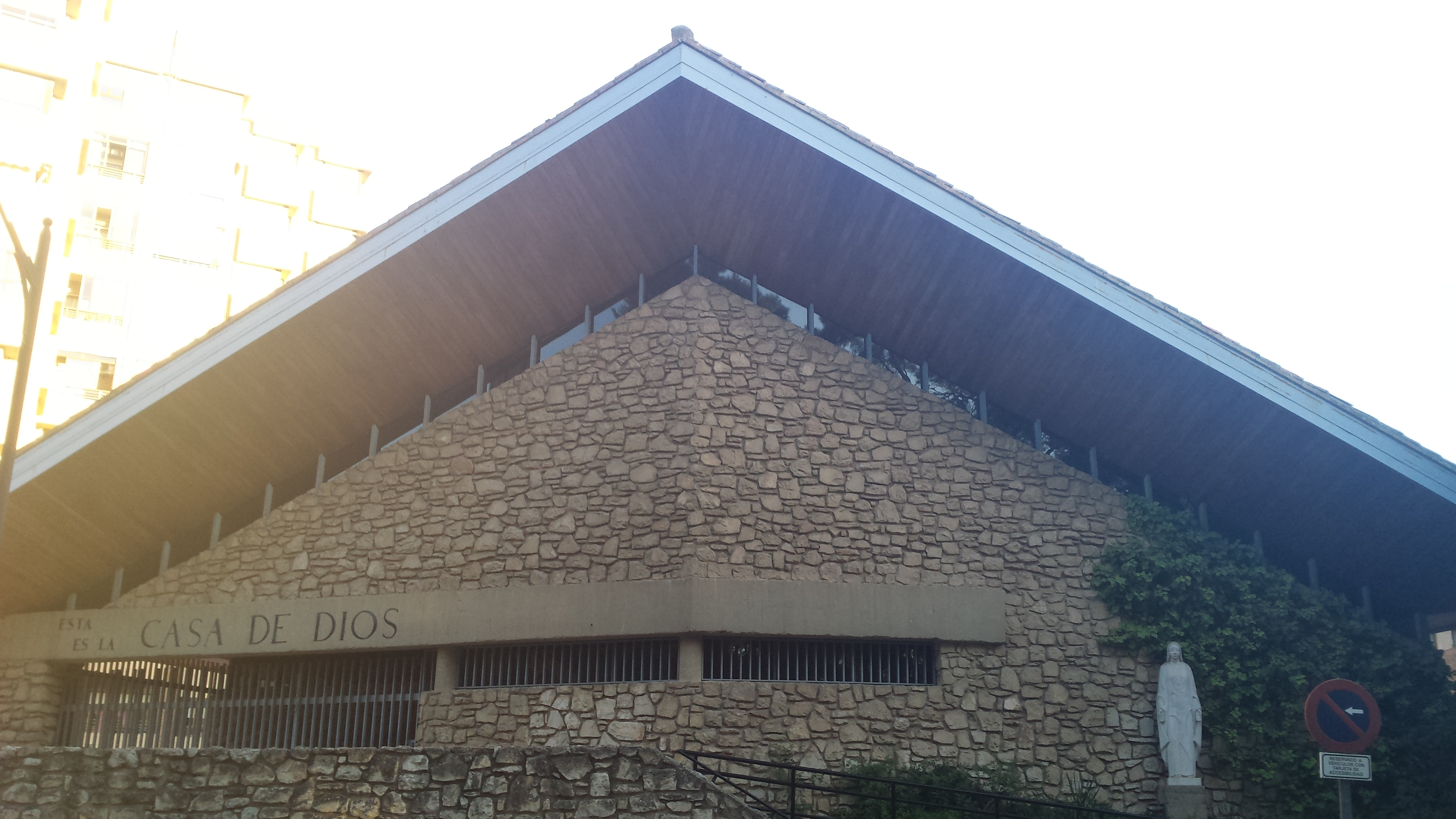
Oratorio San Felipe Neri.

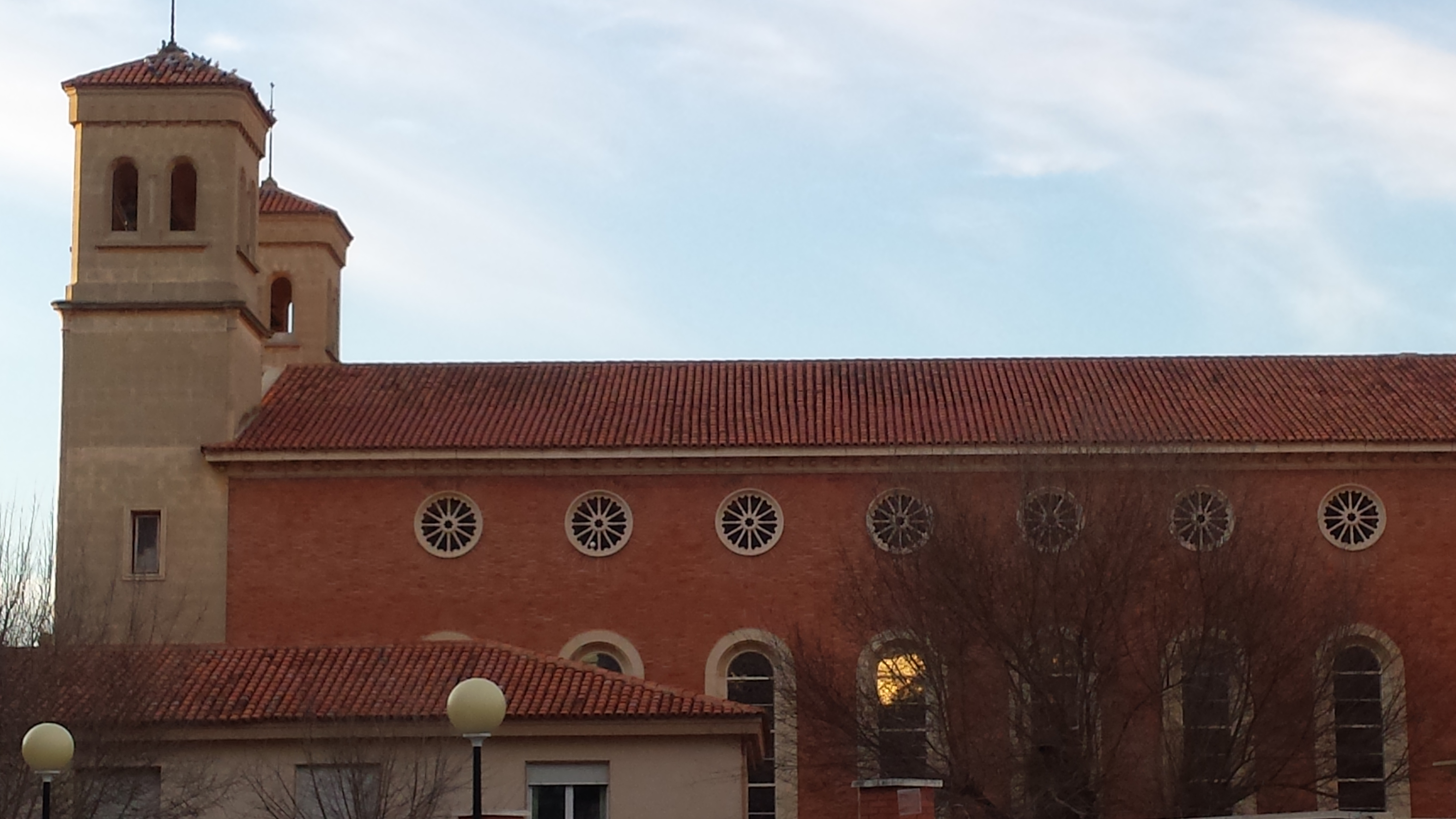
Church of Santa Teresa.

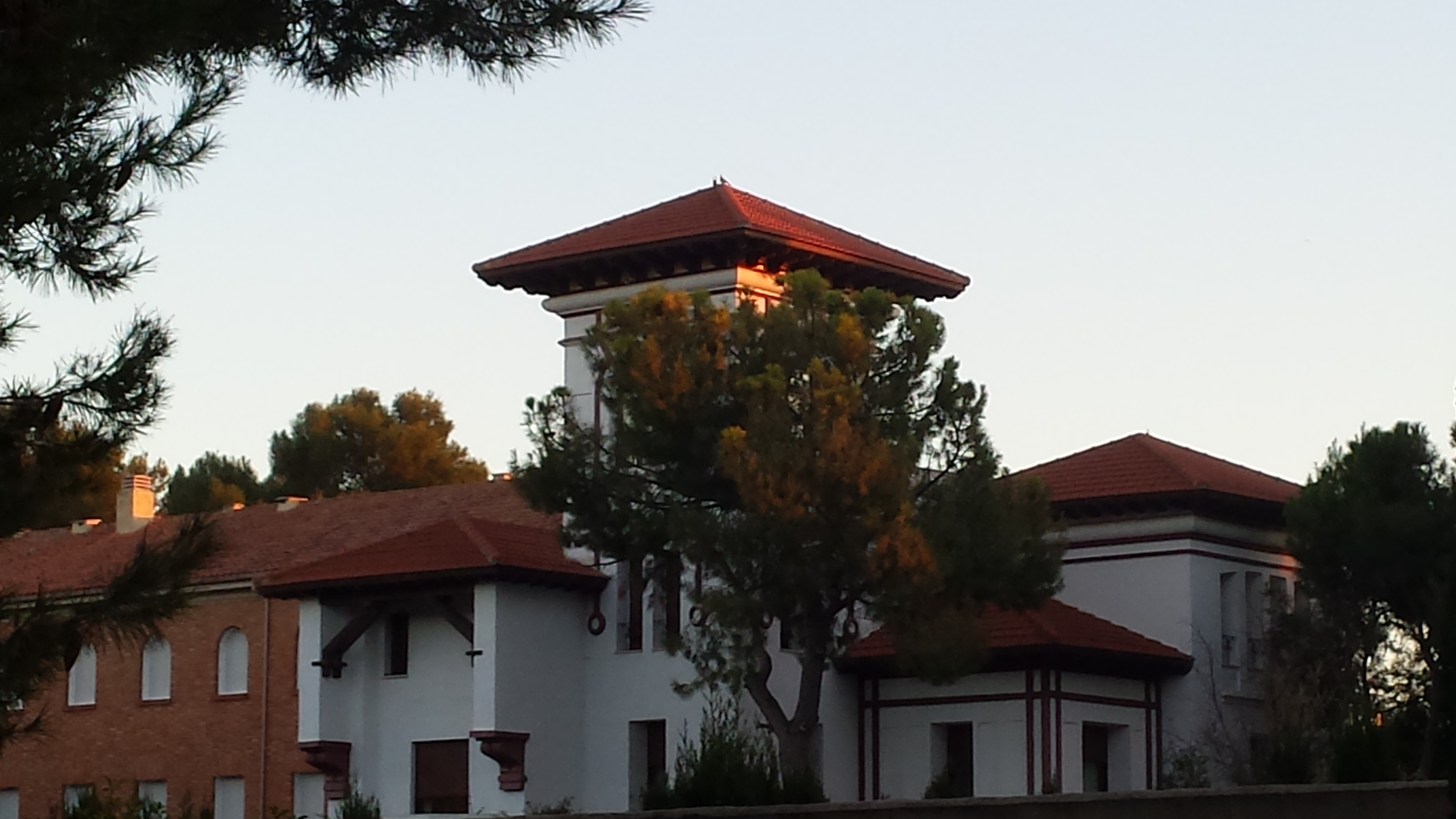
Retreat House of Albacete.

The city has numerous examples of religious architecture of different styles, such as Fatima Church, Monastery of the Incarnation, the Church of the Immaculate Conception, the Oratory of San Felipe Neri, the Church of St. Francis of Assisi, Cathedral San Juan, Church of Our Lady of Pilar, the Diocesan Seminary of Albacete, the Church of Santa Teresa, the Chapel of the Virgen de Los Llanos, the Church of the Assumption, the Retreat House of Albacete, the Church of St. Joseph, the Church of Piarists, the Holy Angel, the Ave Maria Church, the Church of St. Peter, the Church of the Resurrection of the Lord and the Church of Santo Domingo

=== Landmarks ===
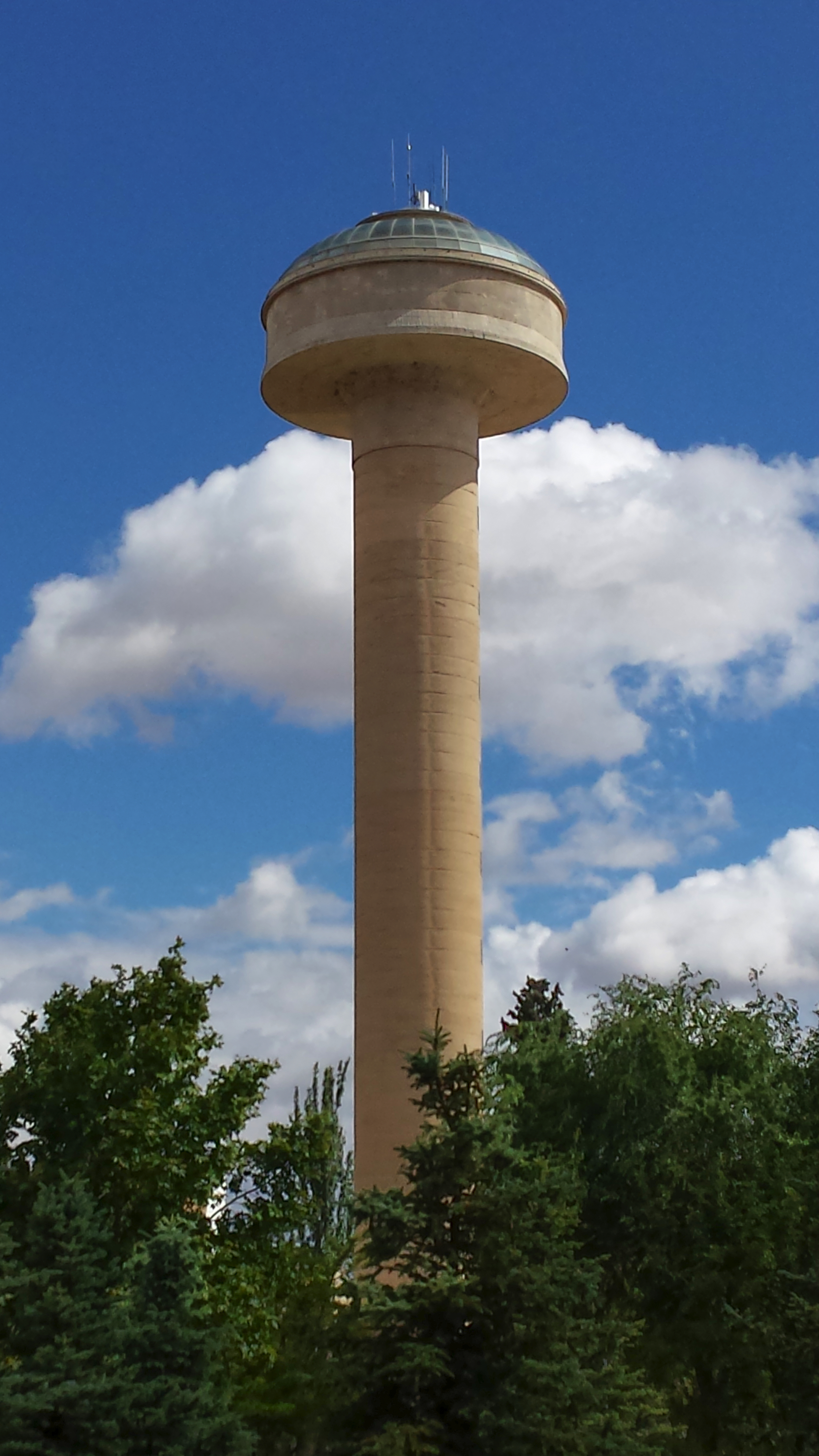
Water Tank Tree Party, lighthouse and symbol of the city.

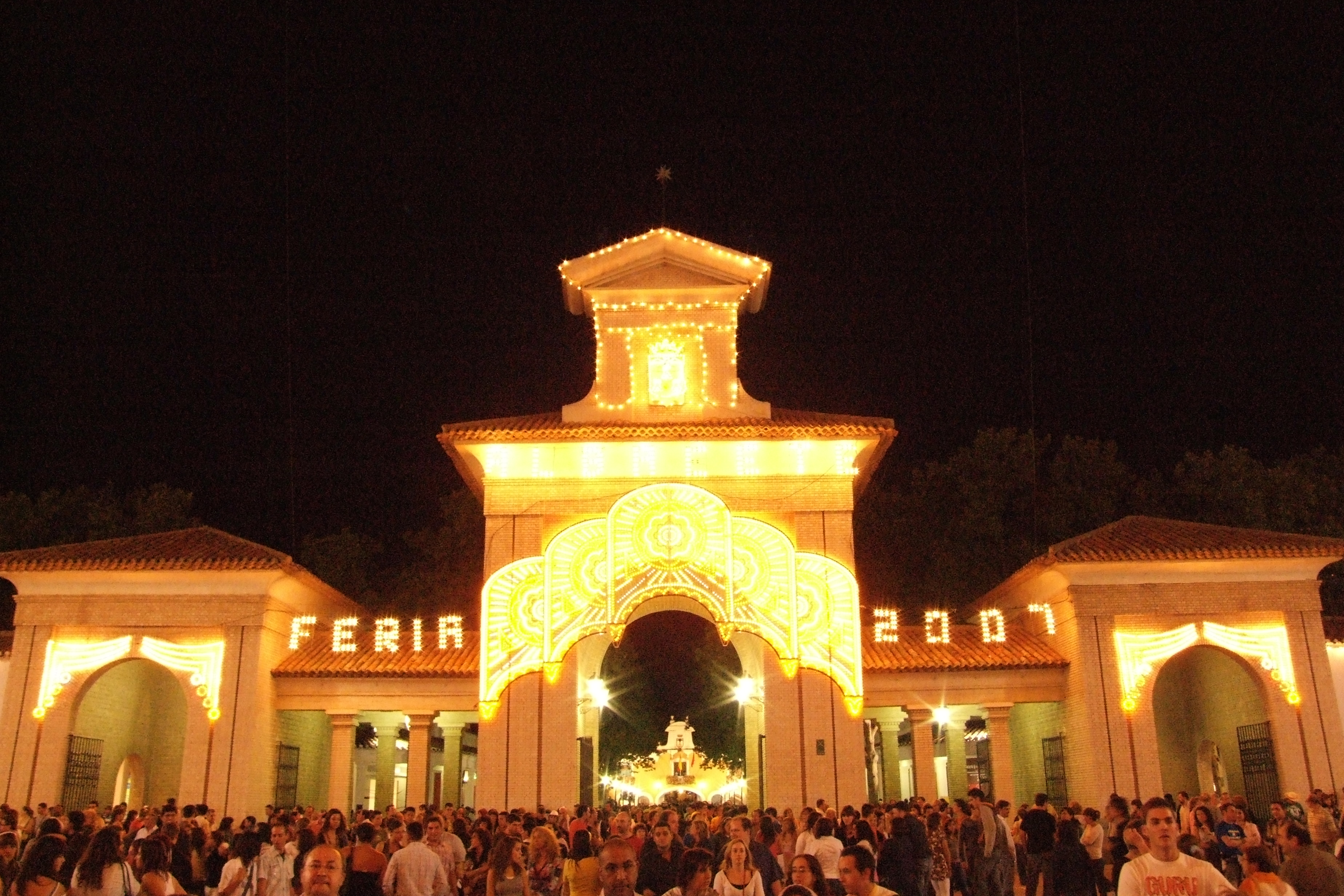
Iron Gate of Albacete.

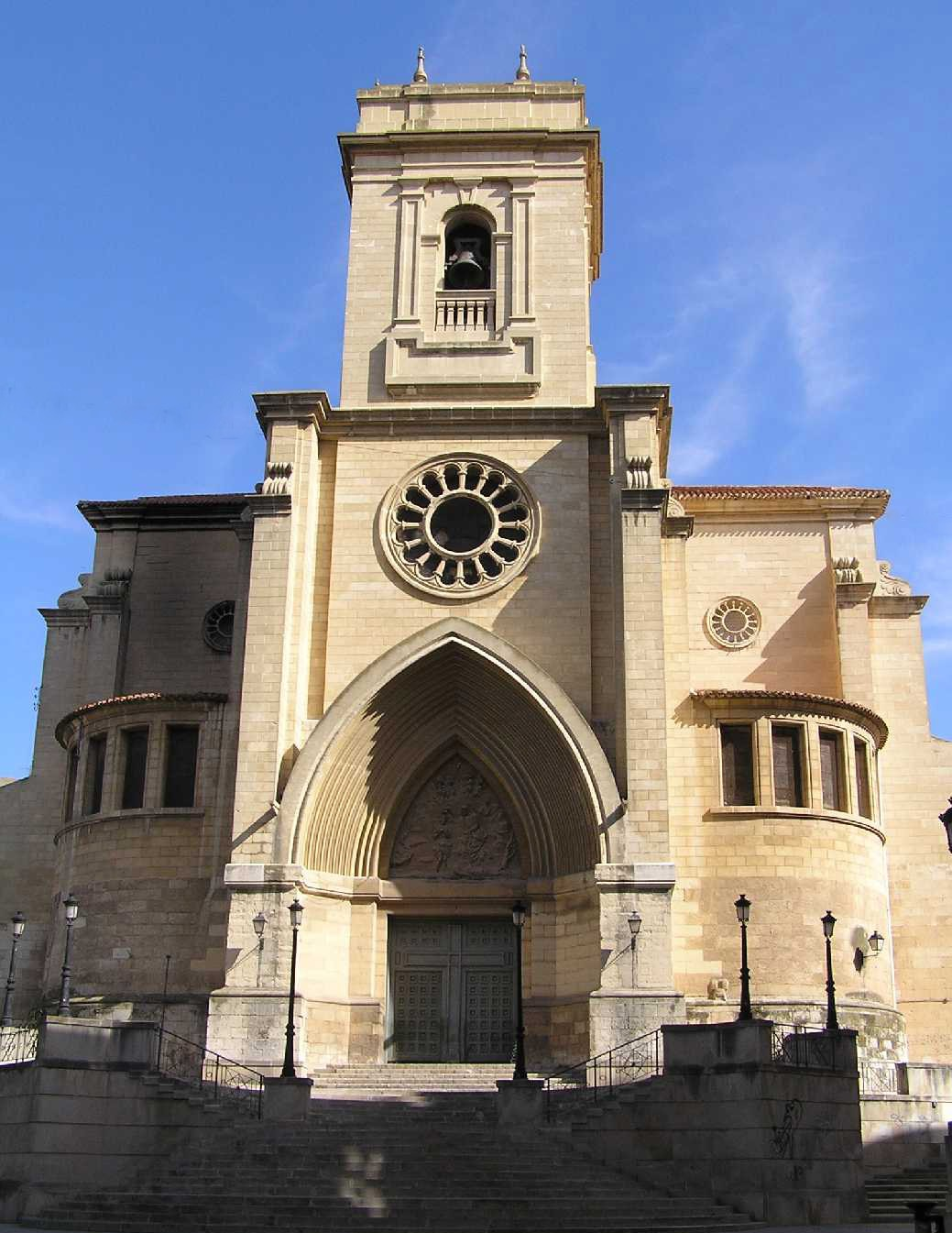
Cathedral of San Juan.

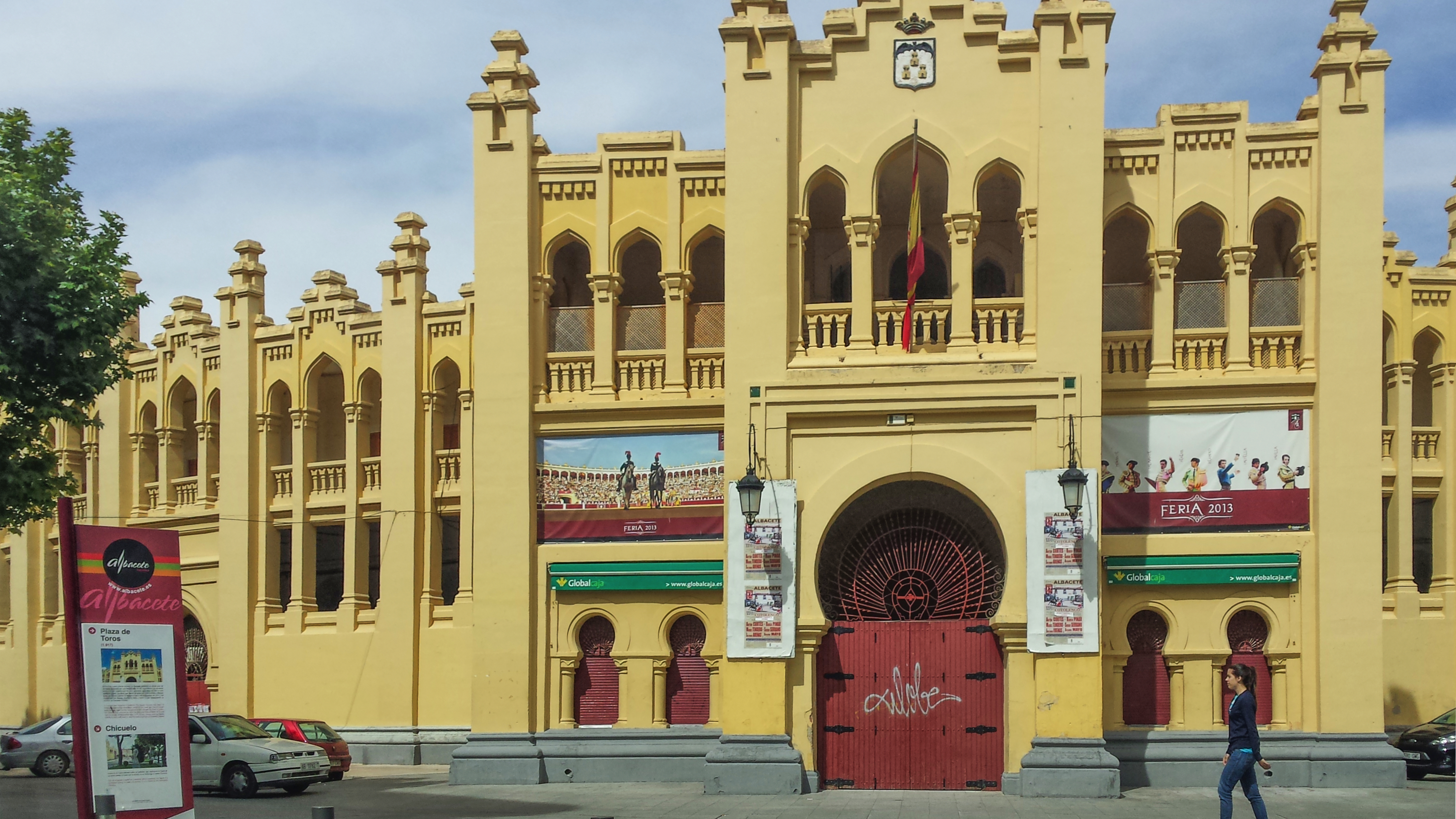
The Plaza de Toros de Albacete, of moorish architectural influence.

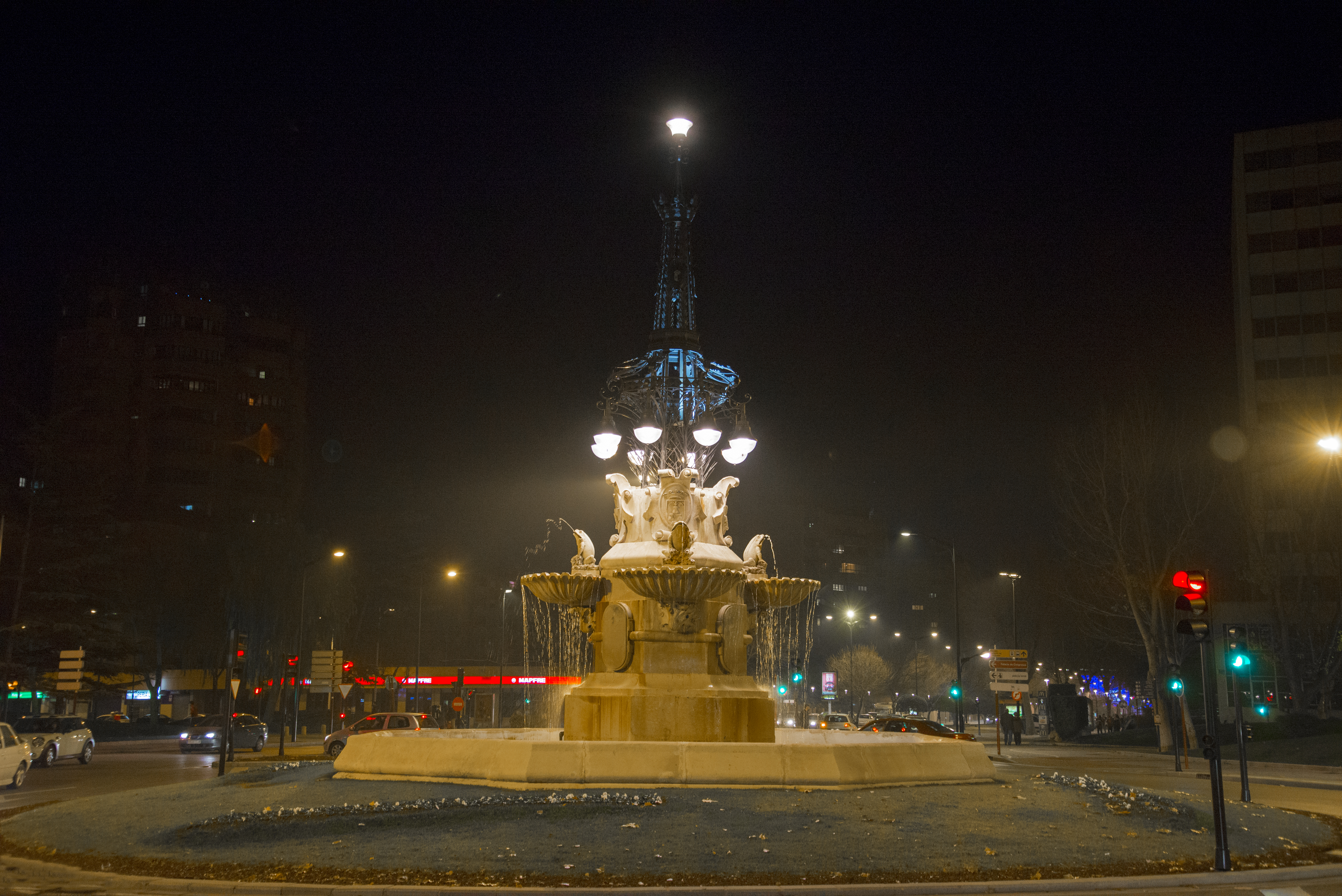
Fountain of the Frogs.

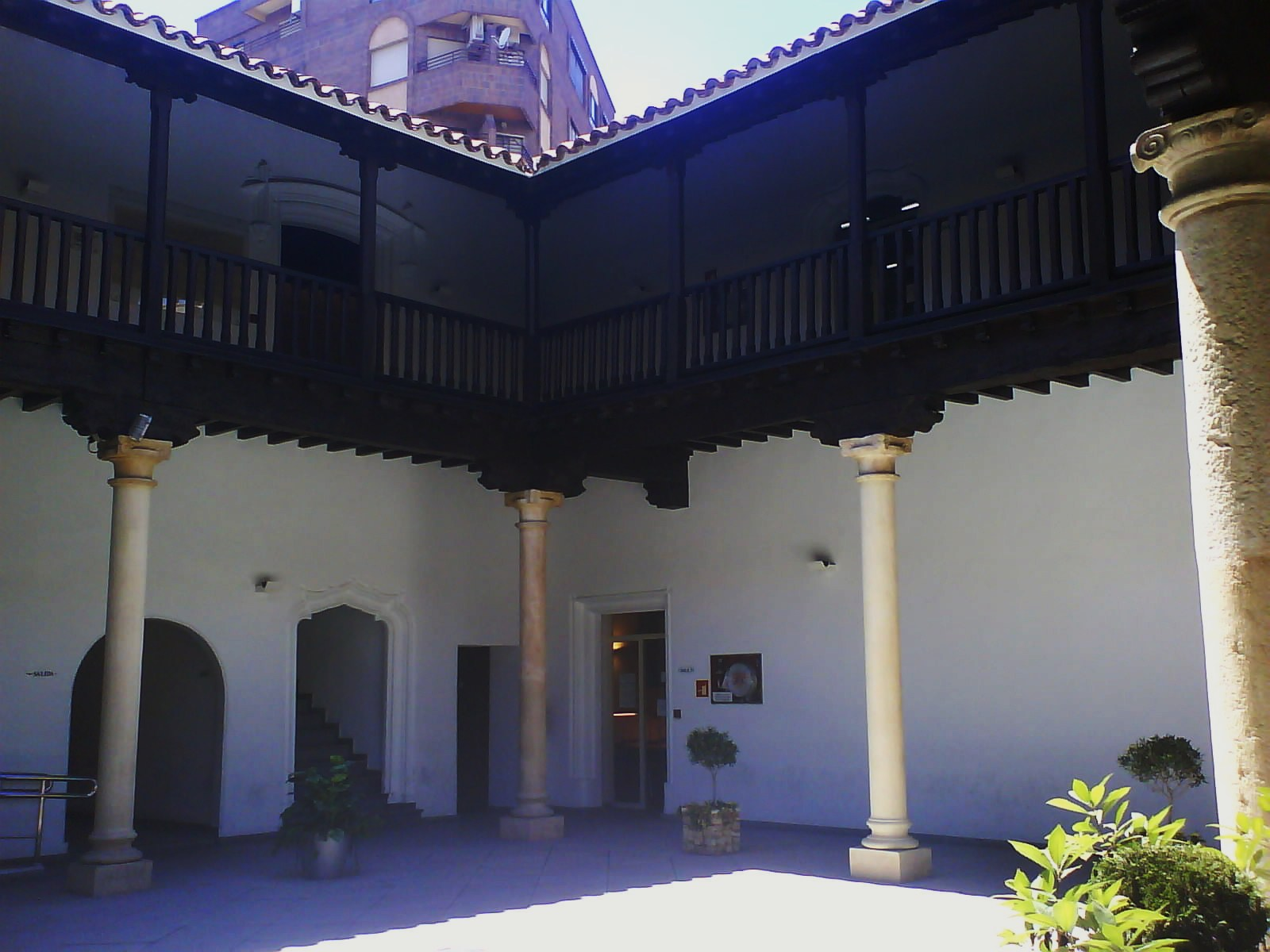
Interior Posada del Rosario, typically manchego building of 16th century.

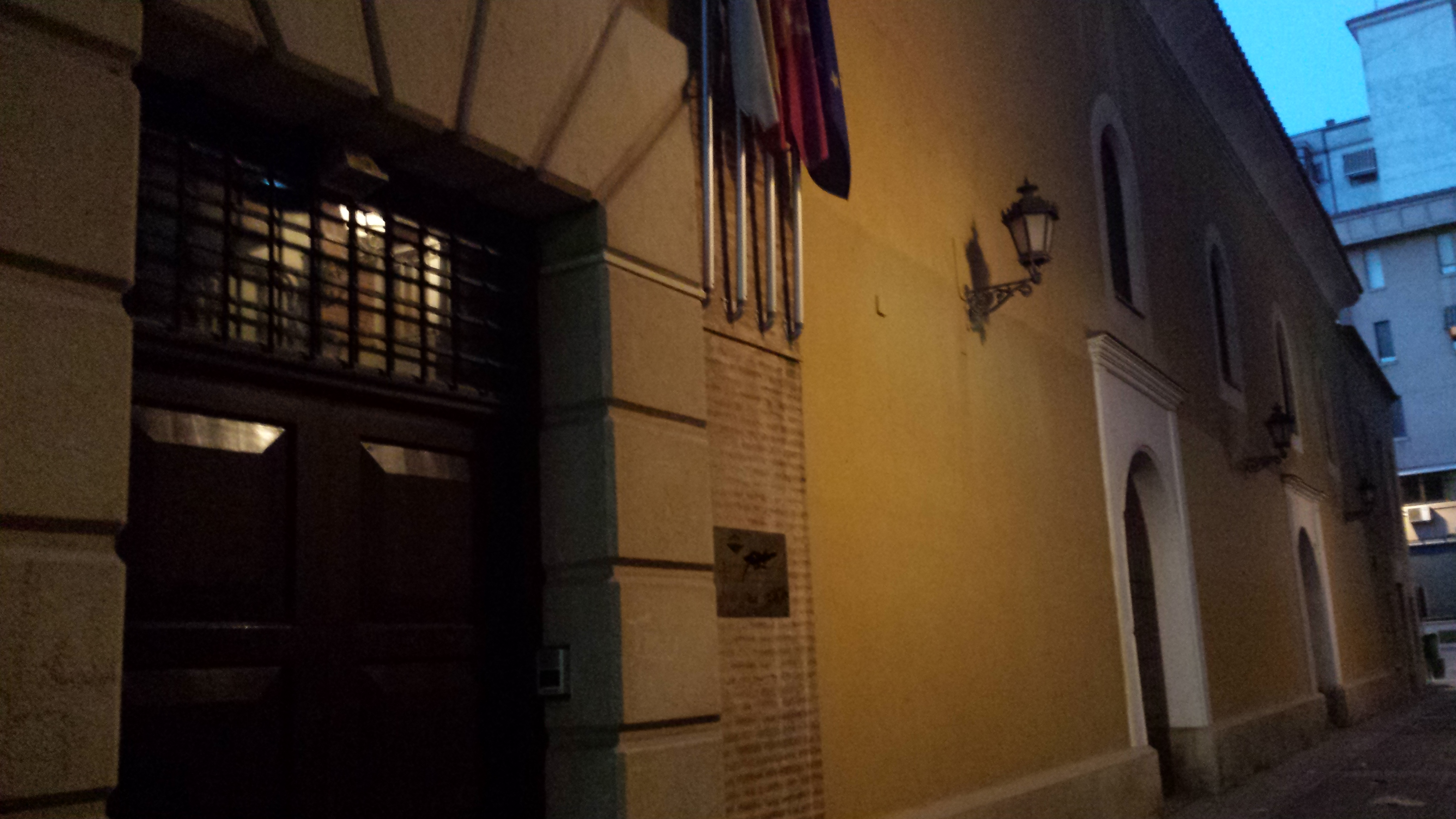
Monastery of the Incarnation, temple renaissance end of 15th century.

Most of the sights of Albacete are inside the center ring or first ring of the city, mainly surrounded by the Ring of Albacete and the Paseo de la Cuba and the Linear Park of Albacete. The Plaza de Altozano [es], located in downtown, is one of the most important hubs of Albacete. It contains many attractions of the capital of Albacete and the Municipal Museum, the Grand Hotel, the Jardines del Altozano, Altozano bomb shelters, the Justice Palace (seat of the High Court of Castilla–La Mancha) or Capitol Cinema. In this place they born five blocks.

The streets (calles) of the Marqués de Molins and Tesifonte Gallego, collectively known as "Calle Ancha" [es] (lit. Broad Street), leading from the Plaza del Altozano south of the city. It is here in which notable strutctures such as the Chamber of Notaries, the Chalet Fontecha, the Cabot House [es], Montecasino [es], the rationalist Legorburo Building [es], the financial Banesto (Casa de Juan López [es]), BBVA [building - es] and Bancaja (Casa de Julia Gómez Alfaro [es]) buildings as well as the Casino Primitivo de Albacete [es], among others, are located.

Calle Ancha intersects with other streets of certain regard within the historic city centre, such as the Calle Concepción, one of the main pillars in the area, and the Calle Mayor. As well as comprising numerous streets and squares of the capital the Calle Mayor, a principal artery of the centre is one of the most commercial and busy streets of Albacete, ends in the historic Plaza Mayor [es] square, from which streets of the historic centre part from such as the Calle Zapateros (lit. Shoemakers' Street) and streets toward Villacerrada [es] leave. Calle Tinte [es], parallel to this "main street", crosses points of interest such as the Lodares Passage or the 16th century Posada del Rosario [es]. Beginning next to the Plaza de la Mancha in the heart of Villacerrada and ending at the Plaza de Carretas [es], it intersects the Calle Tejares [es], the Plaza de San José [es] and the Church of St. Joseph. It therefore passes the Carretas-Huerta de Marzo [es] neighbourhood, where, the Church of the Purest Conception [es], the Depósitos del Sol fountains [es] and its homonymous square [es] are located. It is also notable for including the La Zona [es] area, which is notable for its nightlife within Castilla-La Mancha.

Tesifonte Gallego, the southern part of the "broad street", ends at the Plaza de Gabriel Lodares, which is known as a meeting spot within the city located next to the Abelardo Sanchez Park [es]. Several prestigious buildings make up the square's surroundings such as the Casa Marlo building, the former CCM Building [es] and the head office of the Military Government of Albacete [es], a regional delegation of the Spanish Ministry of Defence (formerly the Arturo Ortiz Cortes Sanatorium). From here begin several other major streets, namely the small and rectangular Plaza de San José de Calasanz [es], the Calle Octavio Cuartero [es] and the two streets which border the park, the Paseo Pedro Simón Abril [es] and the large Avenida de España [es] (lit. Avenue of Spain). The avenue includes highlights such as the Sabuco Bachelor Institute, the Civil Government (headquarters of the central government representation in Albacete). It passes the south-eastern corner of the park in the Plaza Benjamín Palencia where a fountain sits and continues onward South, past the local branch of the El Corte Inglés department stores, the Estadio Carlos Belmonte into the El Campus [es]. The aforementioned park, the largest in Castilla–La Mancha, is the real heart of leisure in the city centre. In it and in its vicinity are numerous tourist attractions of the regional capital as the Archaeological Museum of Albacete, the Oratory of San Felipe Neri [es] at the Plaza San Felipe Neri, leisure centers of the capital of Albacete, in addition to those located on the avenue.

Between the western side of the park and southern fairgrounds, near the downtown area is the Ensache [es] (lit. Expansion), one of the largest, populated and busiest commercial areas of the capital city of Albacete. Ensache is home to many landmarks of the city such as the Church of Fátima [es], the church of St. Francis of Assisi [es] (Franciscanos, the most populous district of Albacete), the monumental housing market cheap, Plaza de Pablo Picasso [es], the Holy Angel or the Ensache Cultural Centre.

Looking west from the Plaza del Altozano, down the Calle Francisco Fontecha, is the Plaza de la Constituición [es] (lit. Constitution Square), presided over by the monument to Isabel of Portugal. West of the square of, accessed via a staircase, is the Plaza Virgen of Los Llanos [es] atop an old hill, chaired by a statue to the Triumph of the Virgin of Los Llanos, from where the southern façade of Cathedral of Albacete is visible. Above it is the Plaza de la Catedral, looked over by the monumental main entrance of the religious building. The square is extended by a park, in which the Casa de Hortelano [es], home to the Municipal Museum of Cutlery [es] is located as well as the City Hall [es] on its side. On a side street nearby, the Calle Monjas (lit. Nuns' Street) is the renaissance period Convent or Monastery of the Incarnation [es]. From the Cathedral, the Calle San Julián, which further on turns into the Calle de la Feria (lit. Street of the Fair) continues in a westerly fashion, passing by notable places like the Perona House [es], the Ateneo de Albacete and reaching the Feria neighbourhood [es] of the city, an important area of Albacete most renowned for the Fairgrounds [es]. The main structure of the grounds includes a large monumental gate as its entrance, as well as a chapel and the "Templete de la Feria" [es]. The grounds are fronted by a park, the Parque de los Jardinillos [es], which greets visitors in its eastern beginning with the Molino de la Feria [es] (lit. Windmill of the Fair). The park, which also includes the former Iron Gates of Albacete [es] in front of the moorish-revivalist Bullring (Plaza de Toros), is also used for market stalls and includes an amphitheatre as well as another "templete" or bandstand. Further west, outside the central area, other landmarks of the city such as the Parque de la Fiesta de Árbol [es] and its water tanks [es], the tallest structure in Castilla-La Mancha and now features a viewpoint and the Albacete Centre for the Interpretation of Water.

Northwest from the Cathedral square, lie the Avenida de Isabel, la Católica [es] and de Ramon Menéndez Pidal [es]. This throughfare and its surroundings constitute another of the important hubs of activity in the city and jointly host one of the most emblematic of La Mancha city boulevards. Other highlights of this area are the La Veleta [es] area, the Plaza de Isabel II, the Plaza de la Tamos [es] or marmosets.

Leading north from Altozano, is the short Paseo de la Libertad [es], of which some notable buildings are the Provincial Palace [es], the Castilla-La Mancha Palace of Justice [es] (courthouse), the Hotel Regina Albacete [es] and the Municipal Museum [es]. The route crosses the Calle Isaac Peral [es], where the Teatro Circo de Albacete [es], a 19th-century theatre is located. The Paseo de la Libertad ends at the Plaza del Sembrador [es], crowned by the Fuente de las Ranas (lit. Fountain of Frogs) and marked by the Tower of the Council of Education [es]. North of it is the Avenida de la Estación, which ends at the city's railway station, Albacete-Los Llanos. El Sombrador's location is in the middle of the three-kilometre Albacete Linear Park (Parque Lineal) [es]. Linear Park highlights include the flour mill, the Mikado Albacete locomotive [es], the Paseo de los Planetas [es] or the wooden bridge.

Outside the central area they include places like Castizo and historic Santa Teresa [es], the location of the eponymous Church of Santa Teresa [es], the Diocesan Seminary of Albacete [es] and the Retreat House.

=== Gardens, parks and natural environments ===
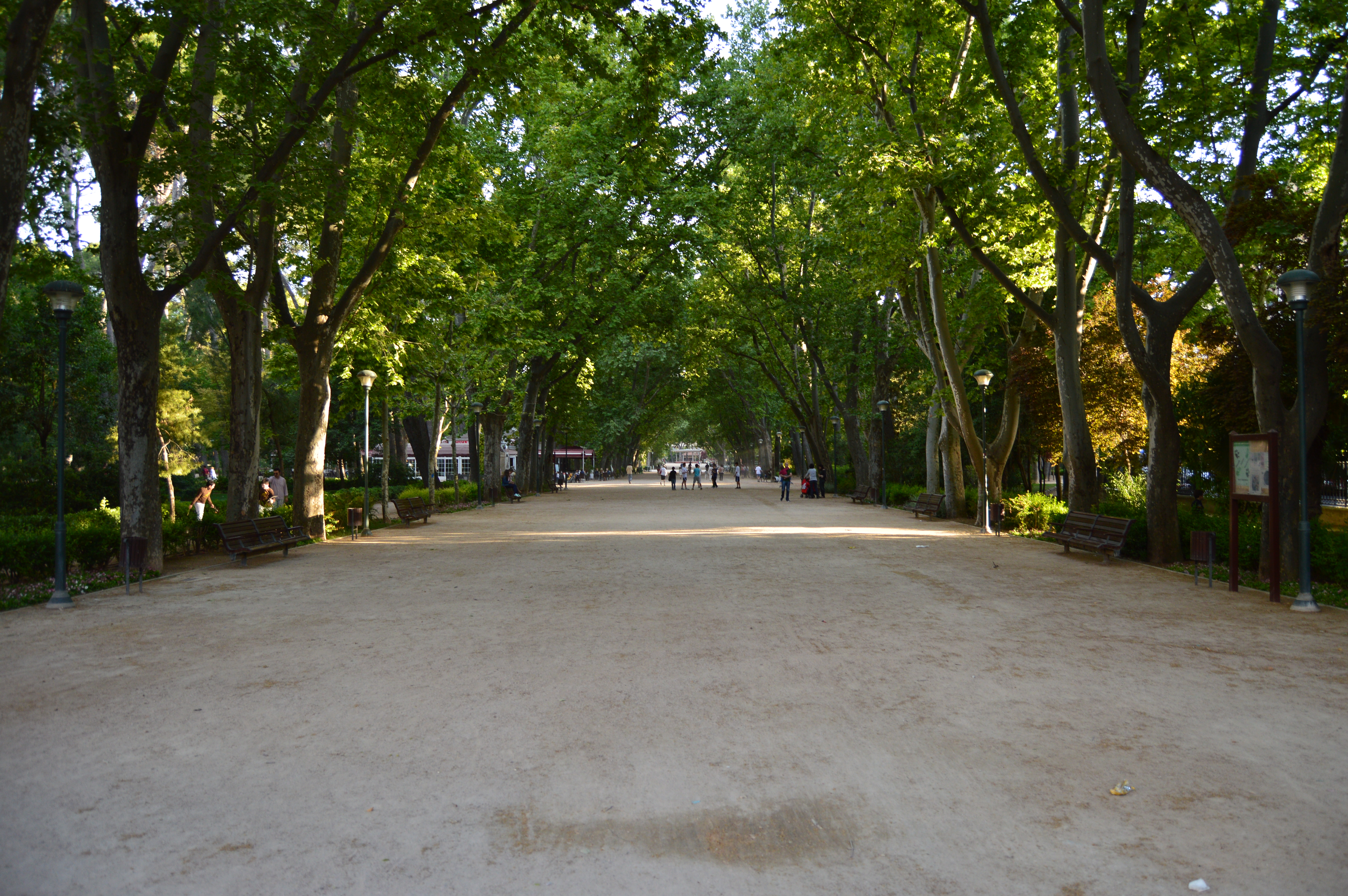
The Abelardo Sanchez Park is the largest urban park in Castilla–La Mancha.

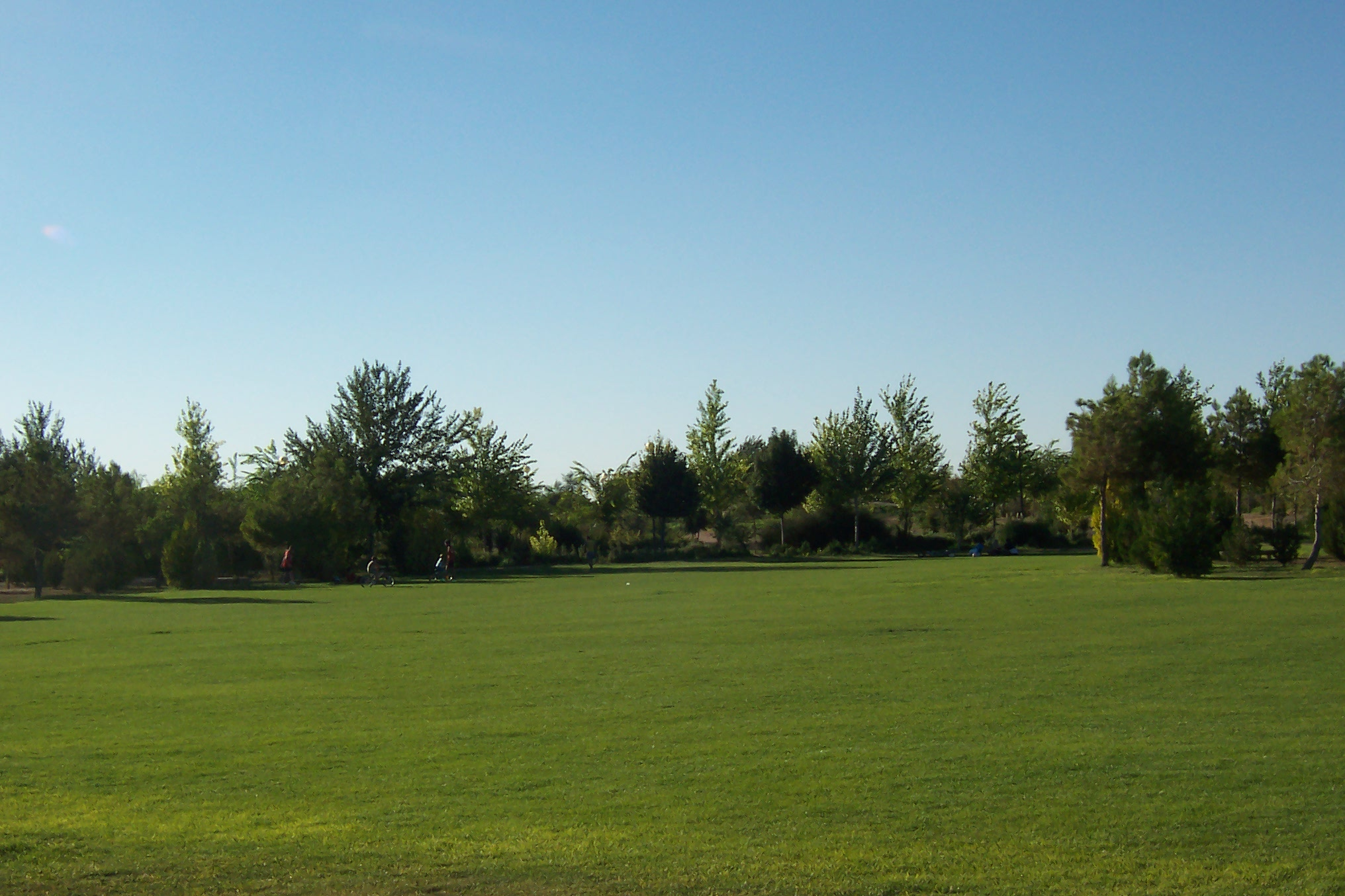
Suburban Parque La Pulgosa.

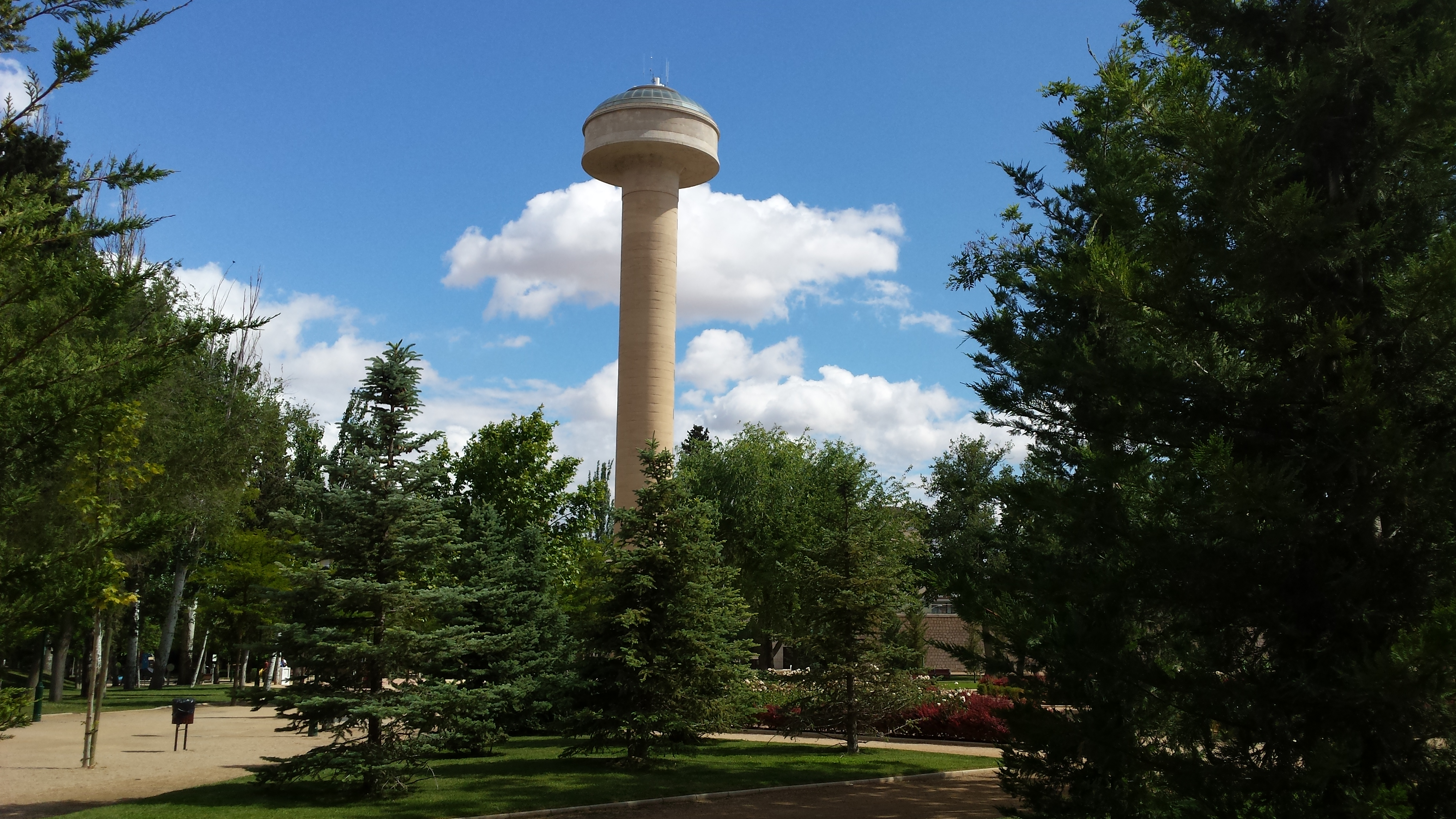
The Festival de Árbol water tower within the park.

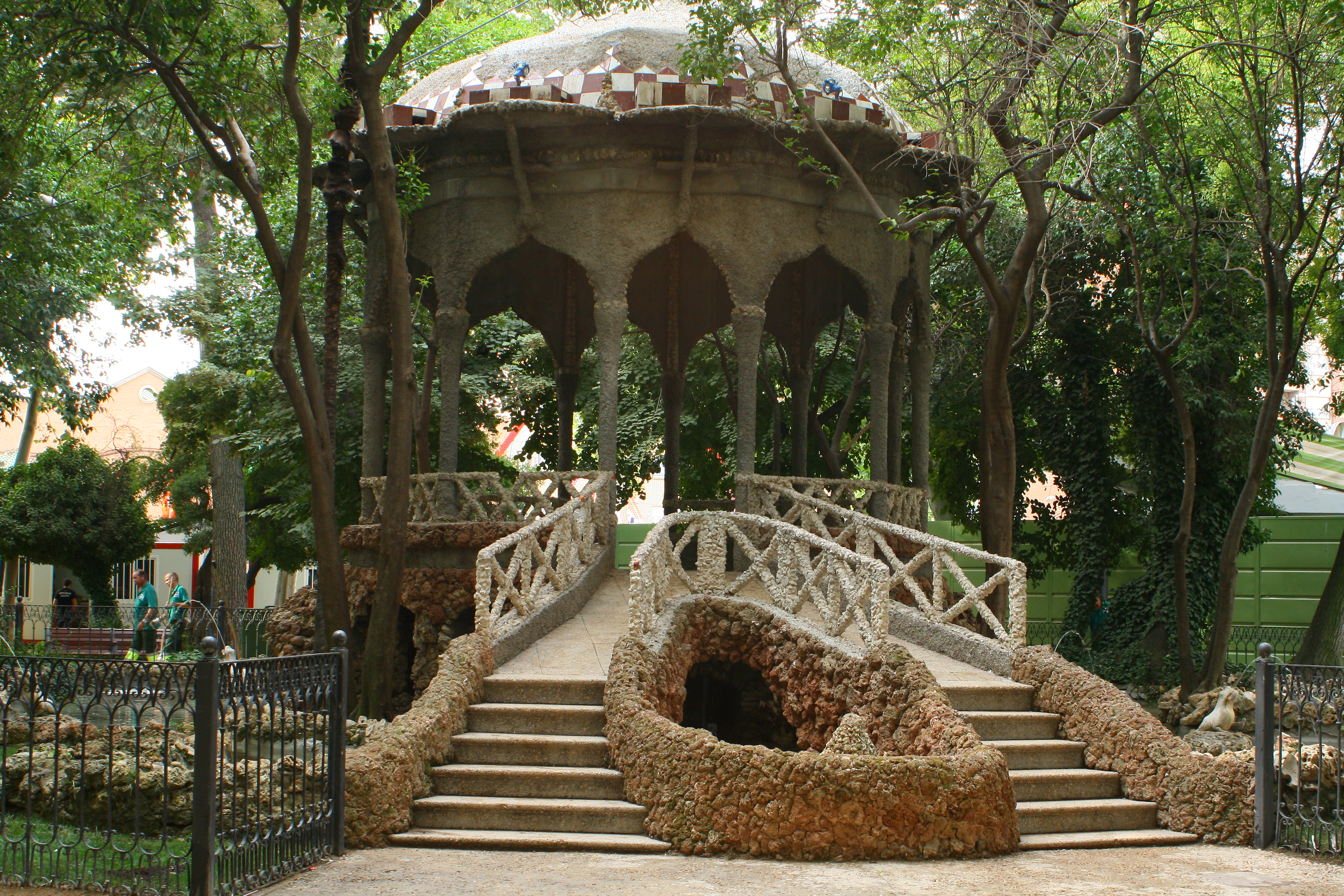
Templet Park Jardinillos.

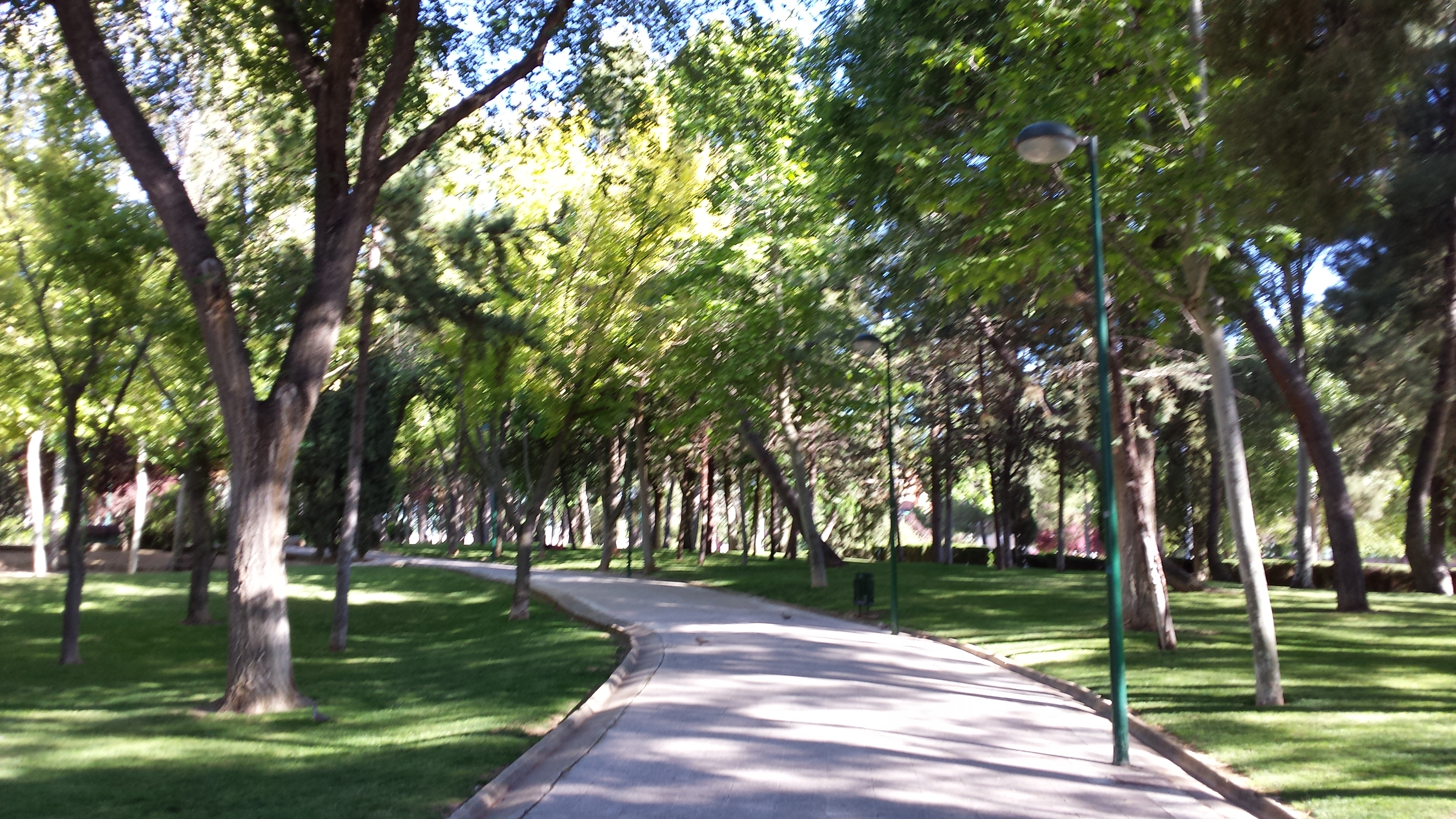
St. Anthony Polygon Park.

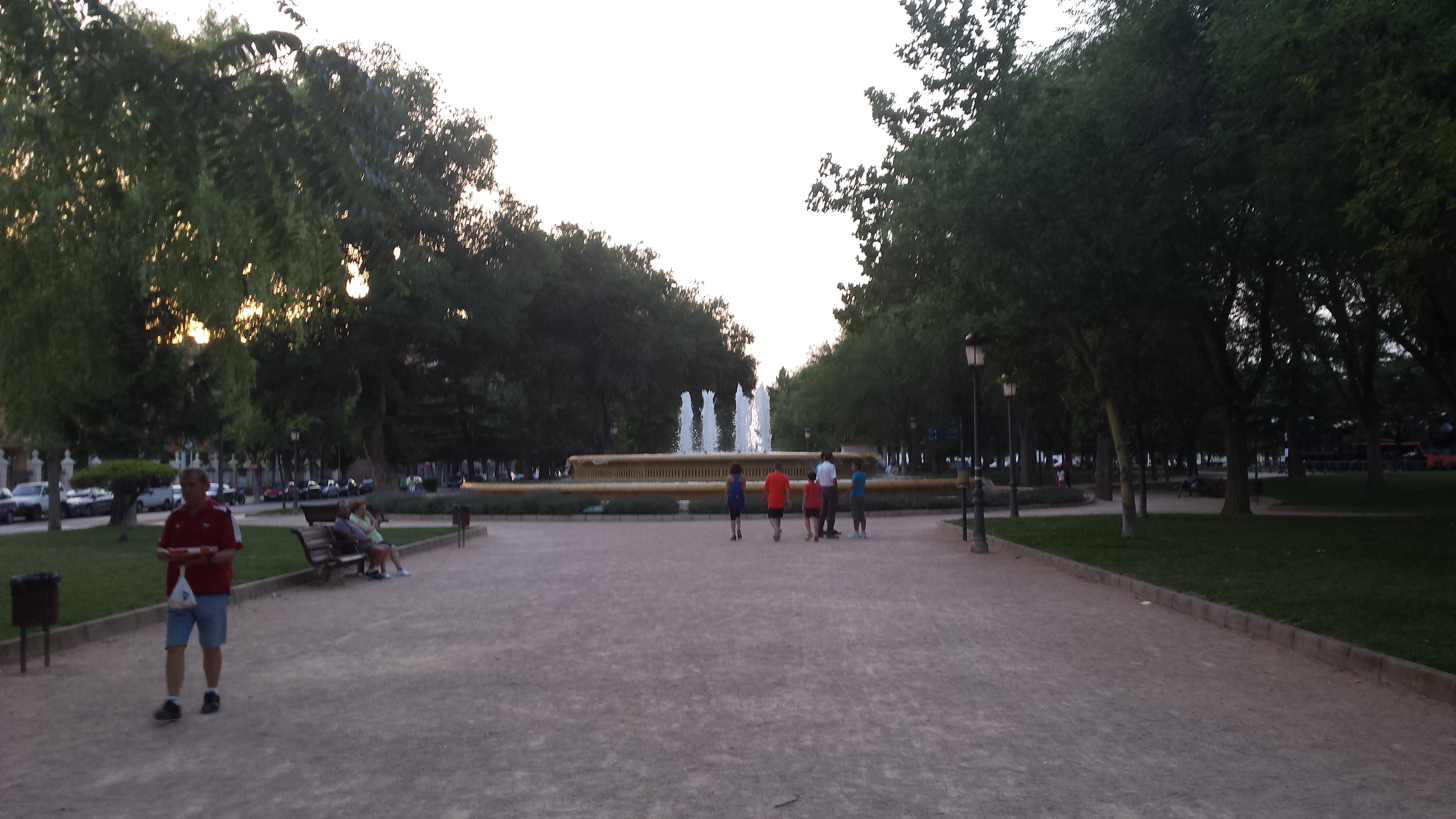
The Albacete Linear Park has more than 3 km (2 mi) in length.

Albacete is a city of Spain with a larger area of parkland. In 2010 there were 1,318,672 square metres (14,194,067 square feet) in the city dedicated to green areas, implying a ratio of 7.3 m^{2} (79 sq ft) per inhabitant.

Apart from squares, gardens and other parks scattered throughout the city, we must highlight the following parks:

- The Abelardo Sanchez Park is the largest urban park in Castilla–La Mancha. Popularly known as "The Park", it tends to be said is "lung" of the city. It has 120,000 m^{2} (1,291,669 sq ft) extension in the center in the city.
- The Festival de Árbol. It houses the famous homonymous water tower, a symbol of the city.
- The Linear Park, a long, wide promenade that crosses the city from northwest to southeast, along the old route of the railway which occupies 74,917 square metres (806,400 square feet) spread over three sections.
- The Parque de los Jardinillos is one of the oldest in the capital. It is located in the Paseo de la Feria, housing the Booth Jardinillos, and has 12,870 m^{2} (138,532 sq ft).
- The San Antón Polygon Park, established in 1980, is located northeast of the city.
- The Gardens of the Hill are the green area for the city's oldest man-made.
- The Botanical Garden of Castilla–La Mancha in Avenida de La Mancha, a botanical garden 7 ha in size, with more than 1,500 species and 100,000 plants.
- Los Pinares del Júcar is located north of the city urban park, which is accessed through the AB-823 road. 70,000 square metres (753,474 square feet) in size, containing several playgrounds and entertainment.
- The suburban park The Pulgosa, which is the largest green area of the city with 398,210 square metres (4,286,297 square feet). Located on the road of the Rocks of San Pedro (CM-3203), has children's playgrounds, trails, sports facilities.
- The Greenway Pulgosa, 3 kilometres (1.9 miles) in length, connects the Avenida de La Mancha with The Pulgosa, the largest urban park of the city with 40 ha extension.
- The Bike path Albacete-Valdeganga, 22 kilometres (14 miles) in length, one of the longest bike lanes in Europe, connects the capital to Tinajeros and Valdeganga.

In addition, the city has an extensive network of trails and natural areas. In this regard highlights the natural path of Maria Cristina Canal, that following enlargement in its different phases currently has 47.9 kilometres (29.8 miles). With regard to the most important natural areas they are:

- The oaks of the road Mahora 231 ha.
- Actual Glen Pozo Rubio with 35.90 ha.
- The banks of the Júcar River which has four sites; Groundhog with 85.53 ha, has twisted of 23.06, 54.47 Cuasiermas that has been, and The Mariquilla with 80.34 hectares.

== Culture and art ==
=== Museums and galleries ===
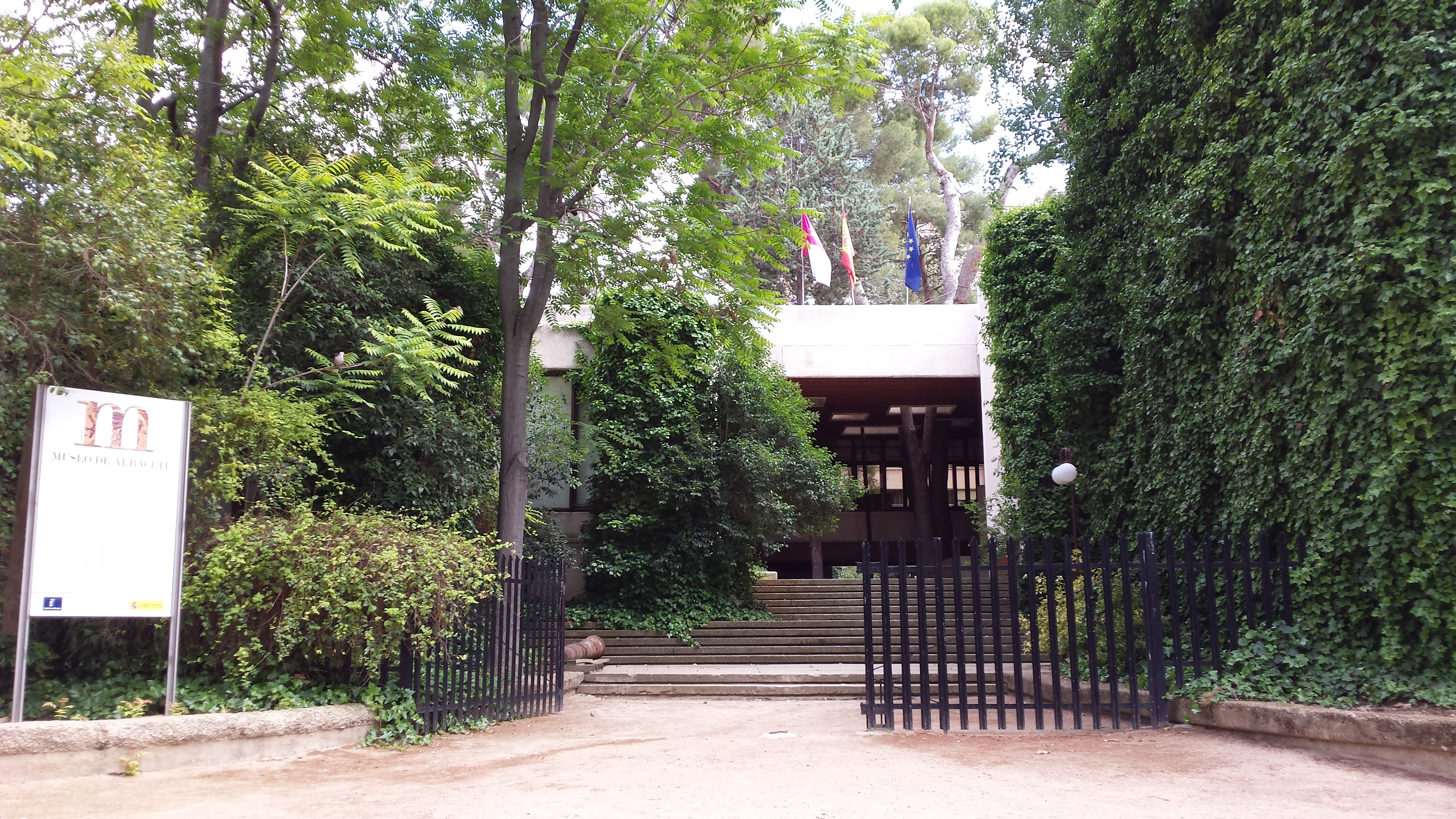
Entrance to Albacete Archaeological Museum in Abelardo Sanchez Park.

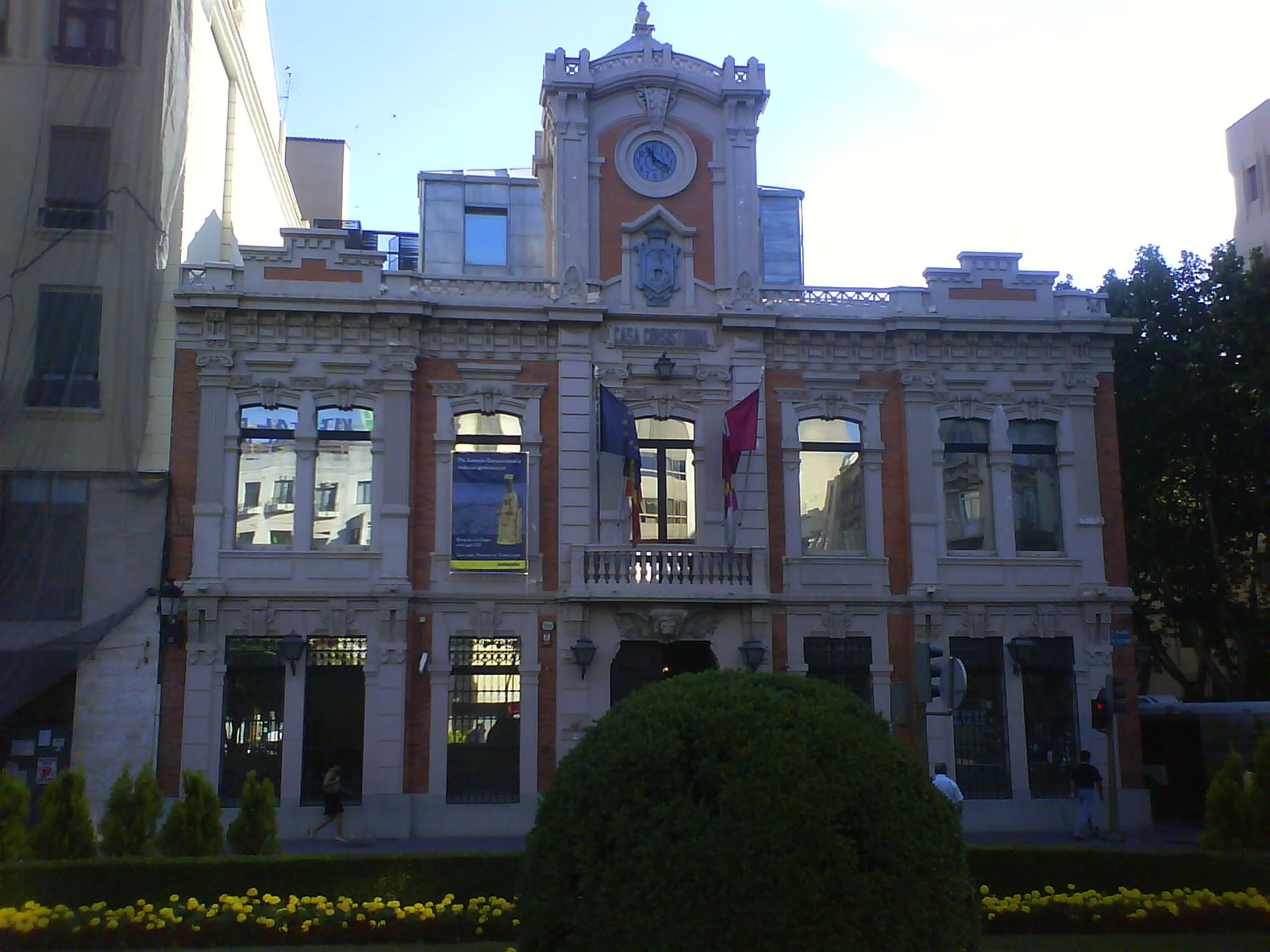
Home Cortés, home of the Municipal Museum of Albacete.

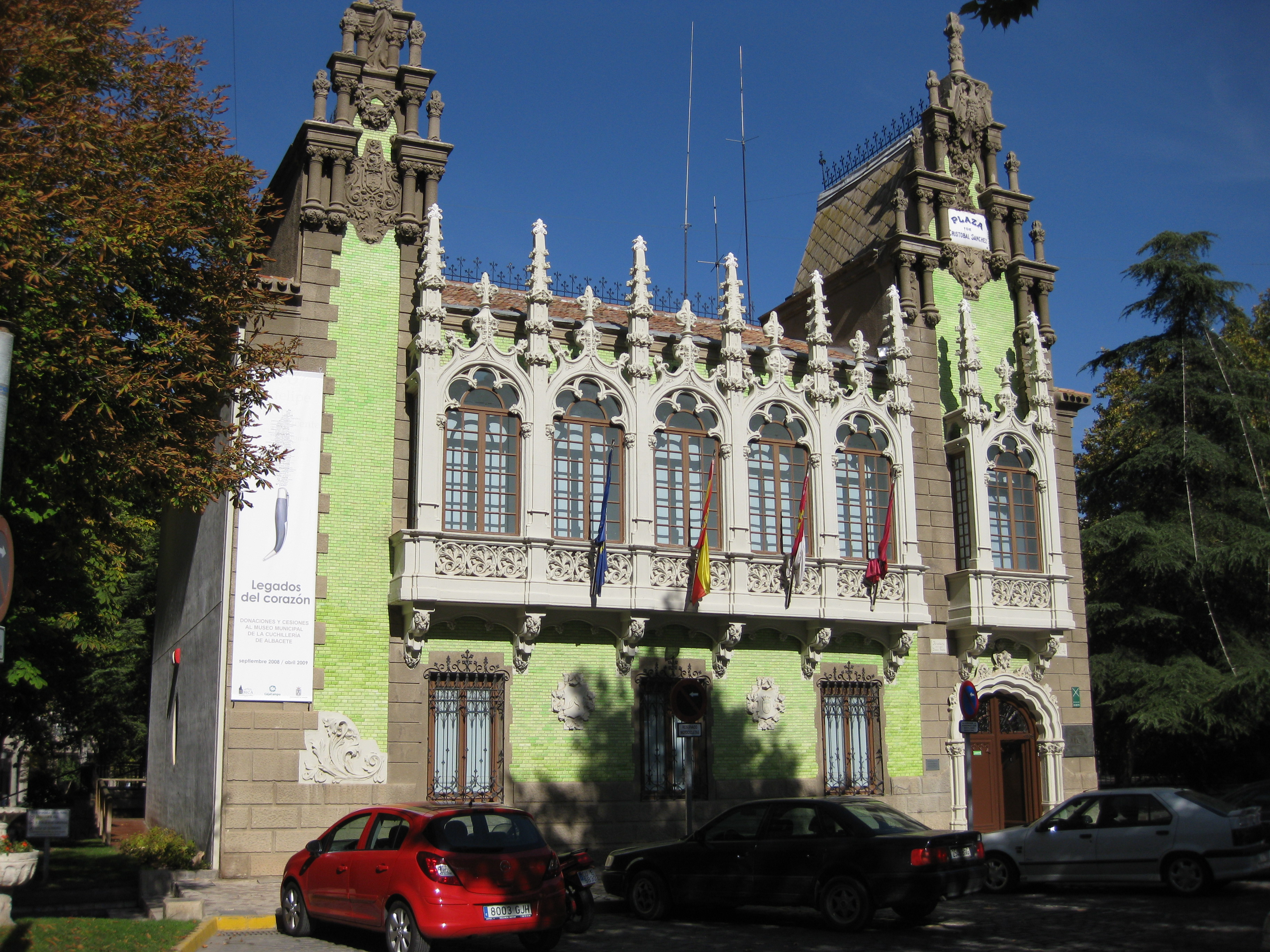
Casa del Hortelano, home of the Museum of Cutlery Albacete.

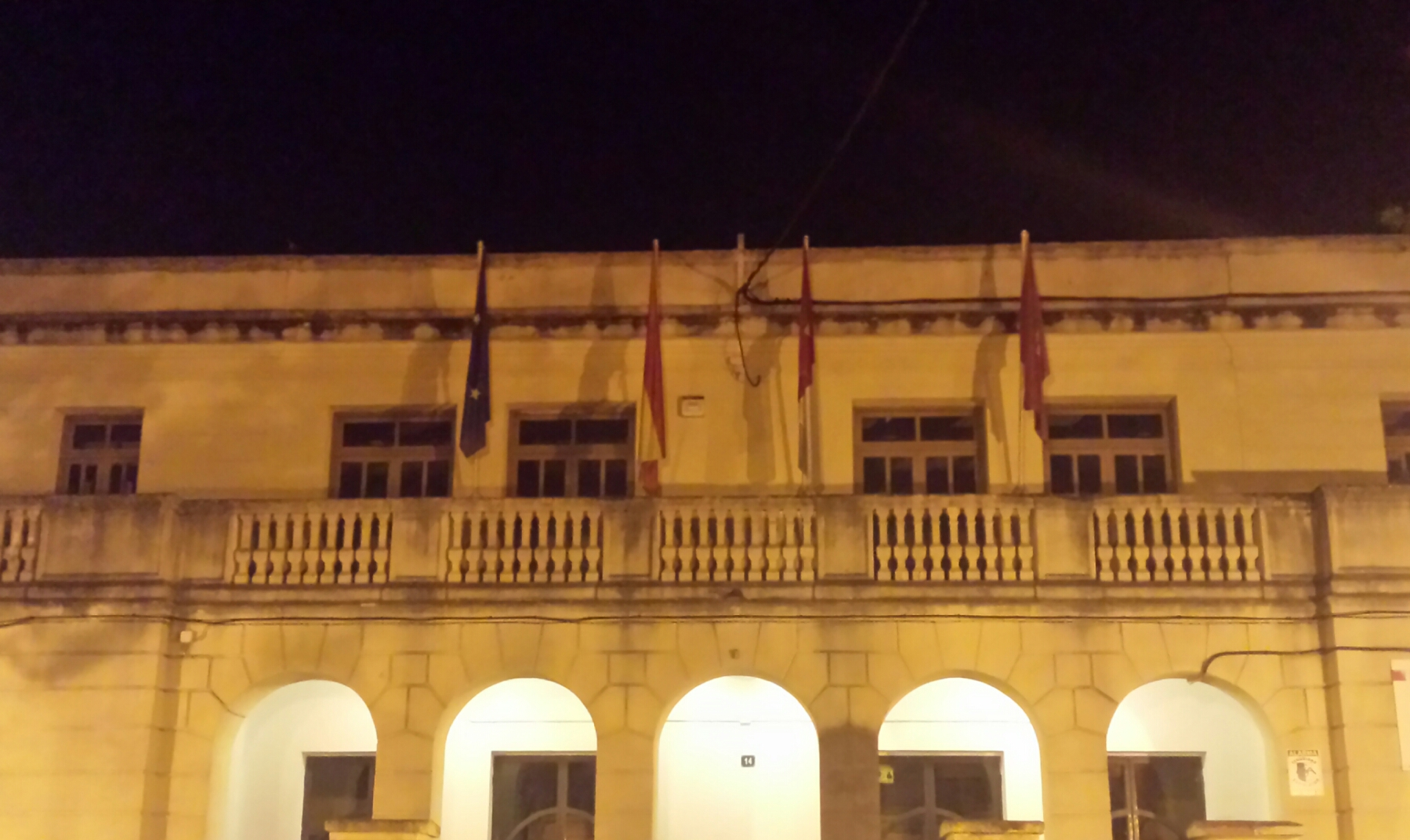
Pedagogical Museum and Children of Castilla–La Mancha.

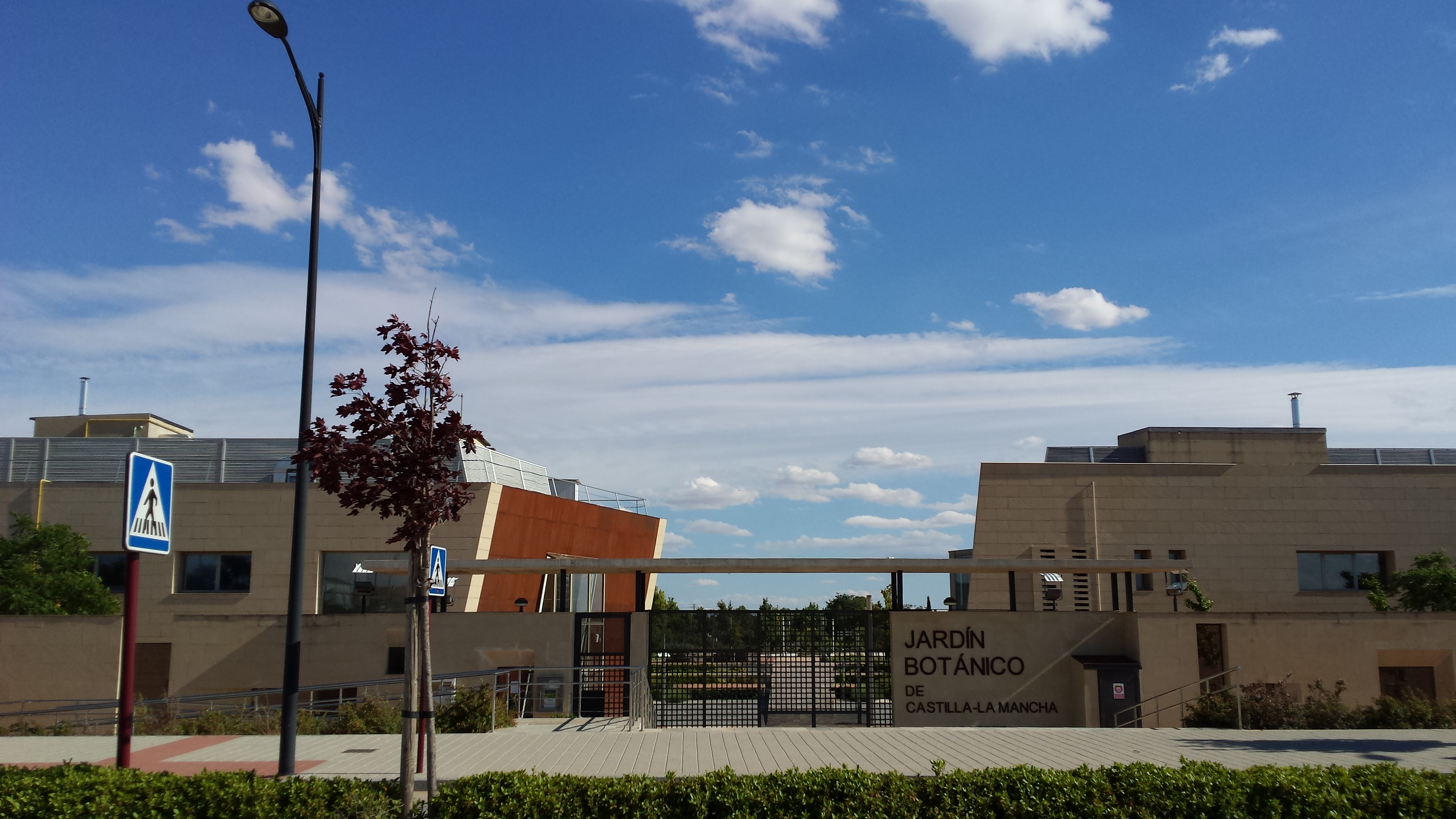
Entrance to Botanical Garden of Castilla–La Mancha.

Museums

- The Archaeological Museum of Albacete, located in the Abelardo Sanchez Park, contains an extensive collection of archaeological sites throughout the province, from the Paleolithic through Middle Ages as well as an important collection of the painter Benjamin Palencia.
- The Pedagogical Museum and Children of Castilla–La Mancha preserves and exhibits related to the history of education and childhood in Castilla–La Mancha materials. It is the only national museum covering all forms of life and culture of the children. Your funds are exposed in four permanent exhibition halls (school, recreation, home and the world of dreams) plus other units dedicated to the Documentation Center and Archive.
- The Municipal Museum of Albacete is located in the building occupied by the City of Albacete until 1986 in the Place of the Hill. The current museum was opened in 1995. It houses various temporary exhibitions, mainly of fine arts and exhibitions on the city.
- The Museum of Cutlery Albacete in Cathedral Square, located in the Casa del Hortelano, houses an extensive collection of traditional and recognized Cutlery Albacete, plus temporary exhibitions on cutlery worldwide. It is one of only three museums of Europe on the cutlery.
- The Interpretation Center of Peace or Peace Museum is located in the bomb shelters of the Hill of Civil War located in Place Altozano. The center caters to the exhibition and dynamic information from the action of peace.
- The Botanical Garden of Castilla–La Mancha is a living museum of the plant world of 7 hectares which houses more than 1 500 species and 100 000 plants.
- The International Folk Art Museum World. It is made up of more than 10,000 pieces from the five continents.
- The Fire Museum of Albacete shows the history of the firefighters in the fight against fire. It includes commemorative helmet 11 S loan from Fire Station New York.
- The Police Museum Albacete takes a journey through the symbols, clothing, weapons and vehicles that are part of the history of Police.

Exhibit space

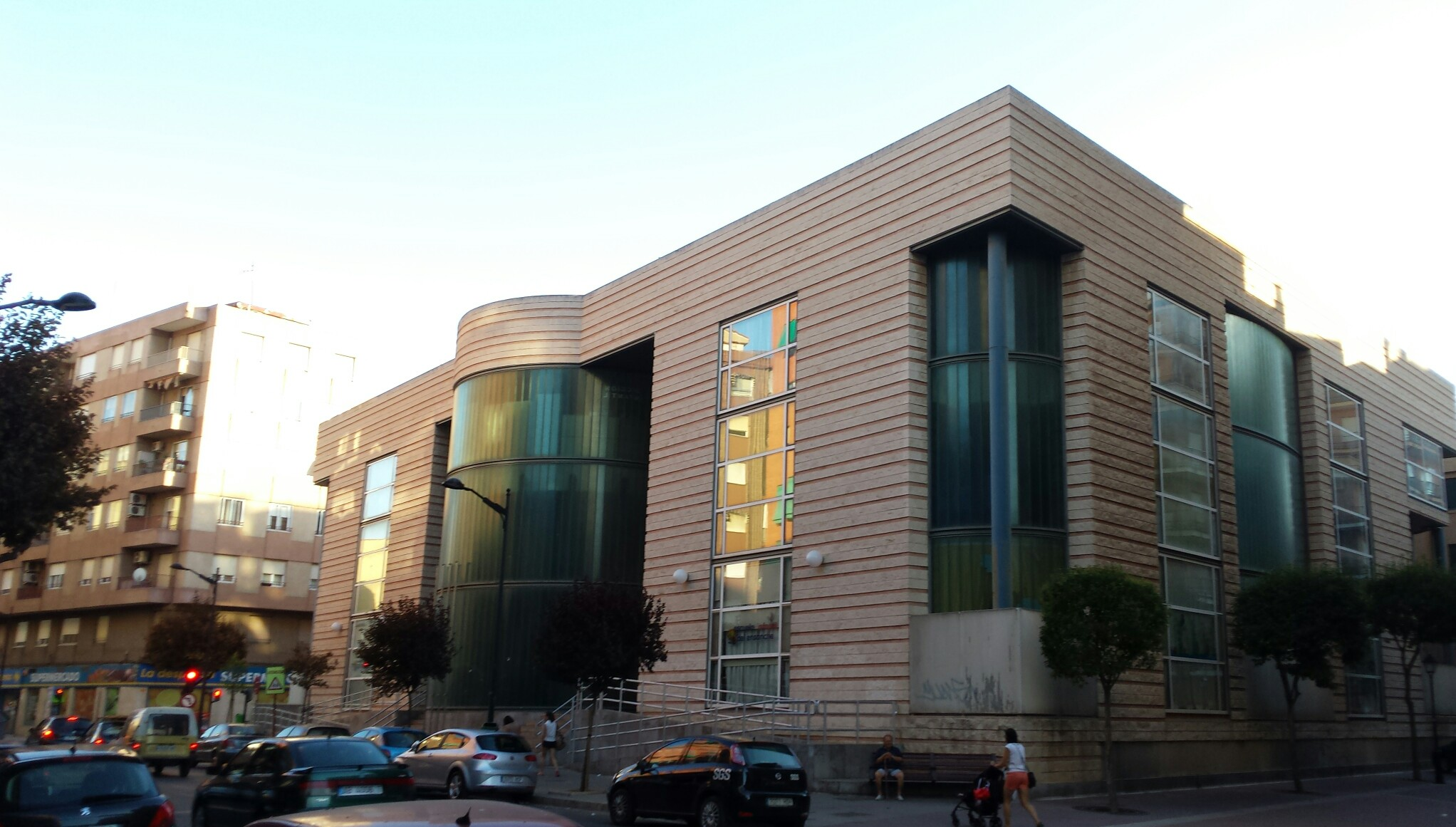
Cultural Center Eixample, cultural center located in the Eixample of La Mancha city.

The city also has many exhibition halls and cultural centers trying different cultural aspects, such as the Caja Castilla–La Mancha Cultural Centre, the Exhibition Hall of the Official College of Architects and Quantity Surveyors Albacete, the Alusearte, the Assumption Cultural Center, Gallery Art Gallery Magnus, the Exhibition Hall ACDA, the House of Culture José Saramago or Center Cultural Eixample.

=== Theatres ===
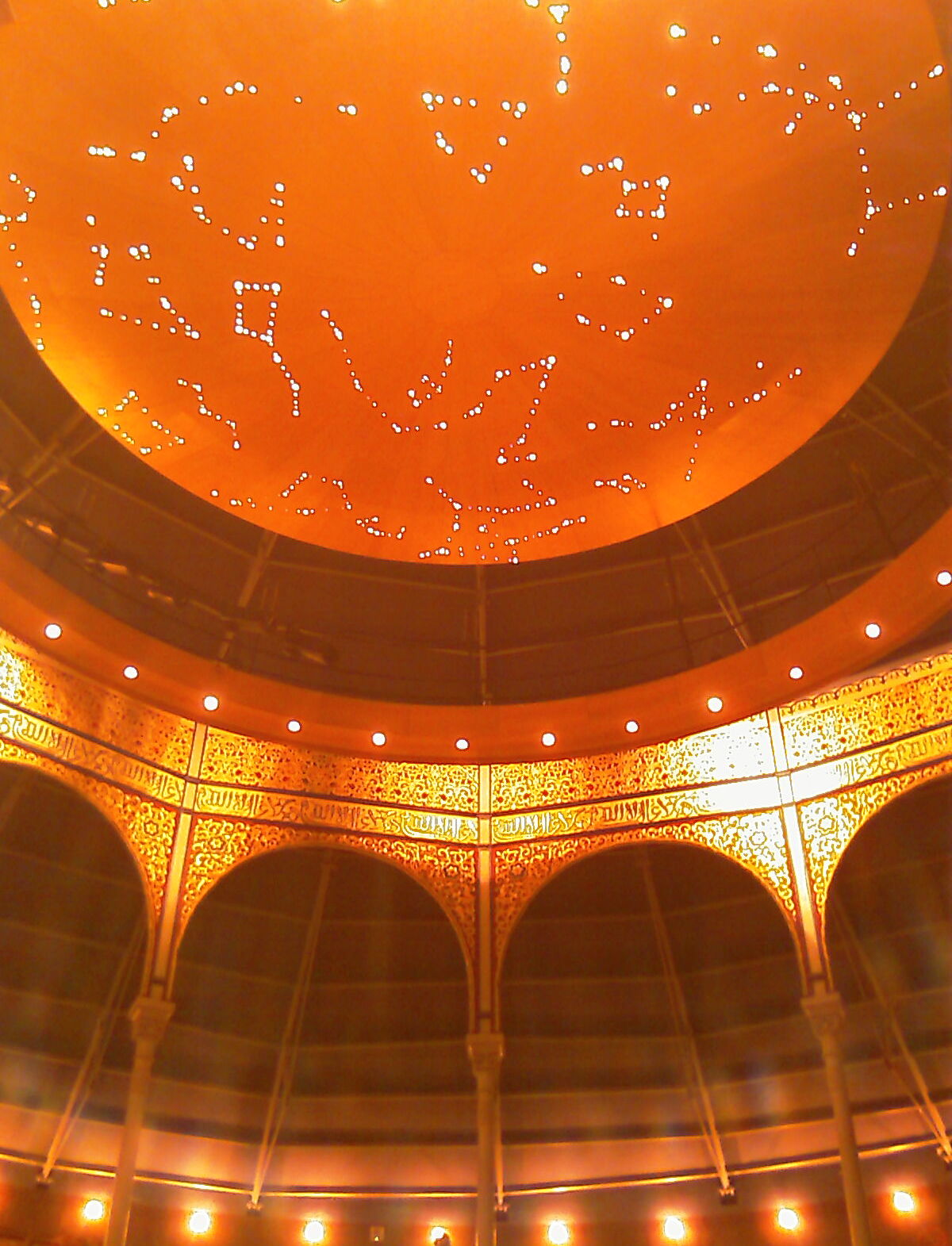
Albacete Circus Theater.

The city of Albacete has many scenic areas, among them:

- The Albacete Circus Theater, opened in 1887 in mudejar style, which still maintains a two-stage capacity (theater and circus), making it unique in Spain and one of the six theaters circuses the existing nineteenth century in the world (most notably the Coliseu dos Recreios of Lisbon (Portugal), the Cirque D'Hiver of Paris (France) or the Bolshoi Theatre of Moscow (Russia)) and has 895 seats altogether.
- The Teatro de la Paz. Has 645 seats, offering a varied program throughout the year
- The Candilejas Theatre, located in the heart of Albacete, independent programming commitment.
- The Auditorium Albacete, where they usually perform musical activities (concerts, dance, etc.) and theatrical performances, and has a total capacity of 560 people, and where pictorial and photographic exhibitions are also held.
- The Booth Jardinillos is a multi-purpose outdoor enclosure designed to accommodate all types of events, shows and concerts located in the Paseo de la Feria. It has capacity for 6300 spectators.
- The Albacete Congress Palace, opened in 2007, has capacity for about 2,000 people and hosts all kinds of events.

=== Festivities ===
==== Albacete Fair ====
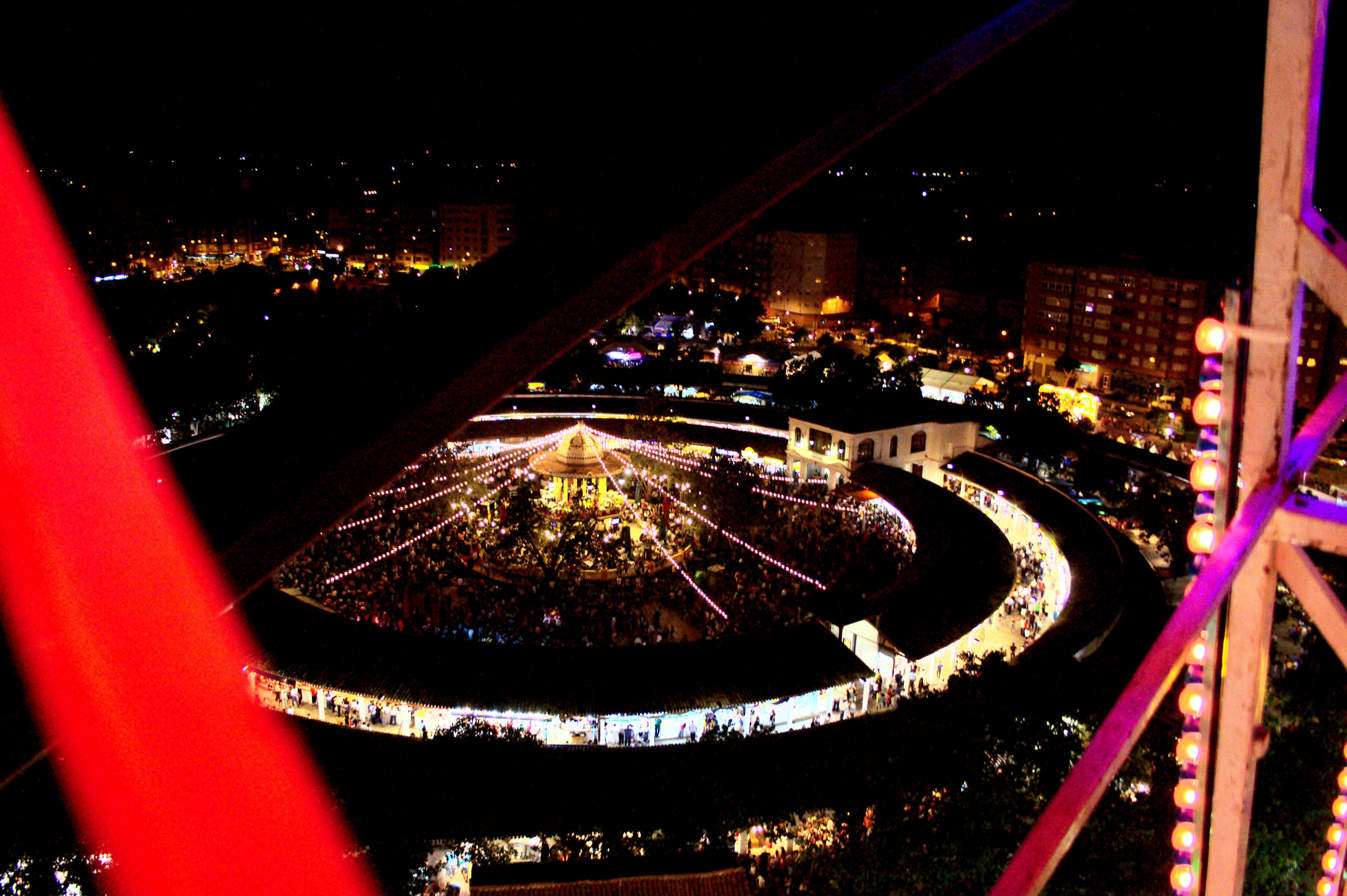
Night image of the Fair Albacete, which receives over 2 million visitors.

From 7 to 17 September, the Fair Albacete takes place. It is the "biggest party" in the Albacete calendar. In 2010, the third anniversary of the declaration of free fair was held by Felipe V, although it several centuries ago and celebrated is held in honor of the patron saint of the city, the Virgin of Los Llanos, and is accompanied by one of the most important bullfights calendar national.

The 7th begins in the afternoon with the Parade Albacete Fair, a parade of floats from the Plaza de Gabriel Lodares through Iron Gate of Fairground, after which the opening of the same takes place. Since then, and for ten days, they are held numerous recreational, cultural and sports activities throughout the city, but especially concentrated around Paseo de la Feria, the Fairground and surroundings (so-called string), where attractions of all types and booths of all associations are based.

==== Feast of San Juan ====
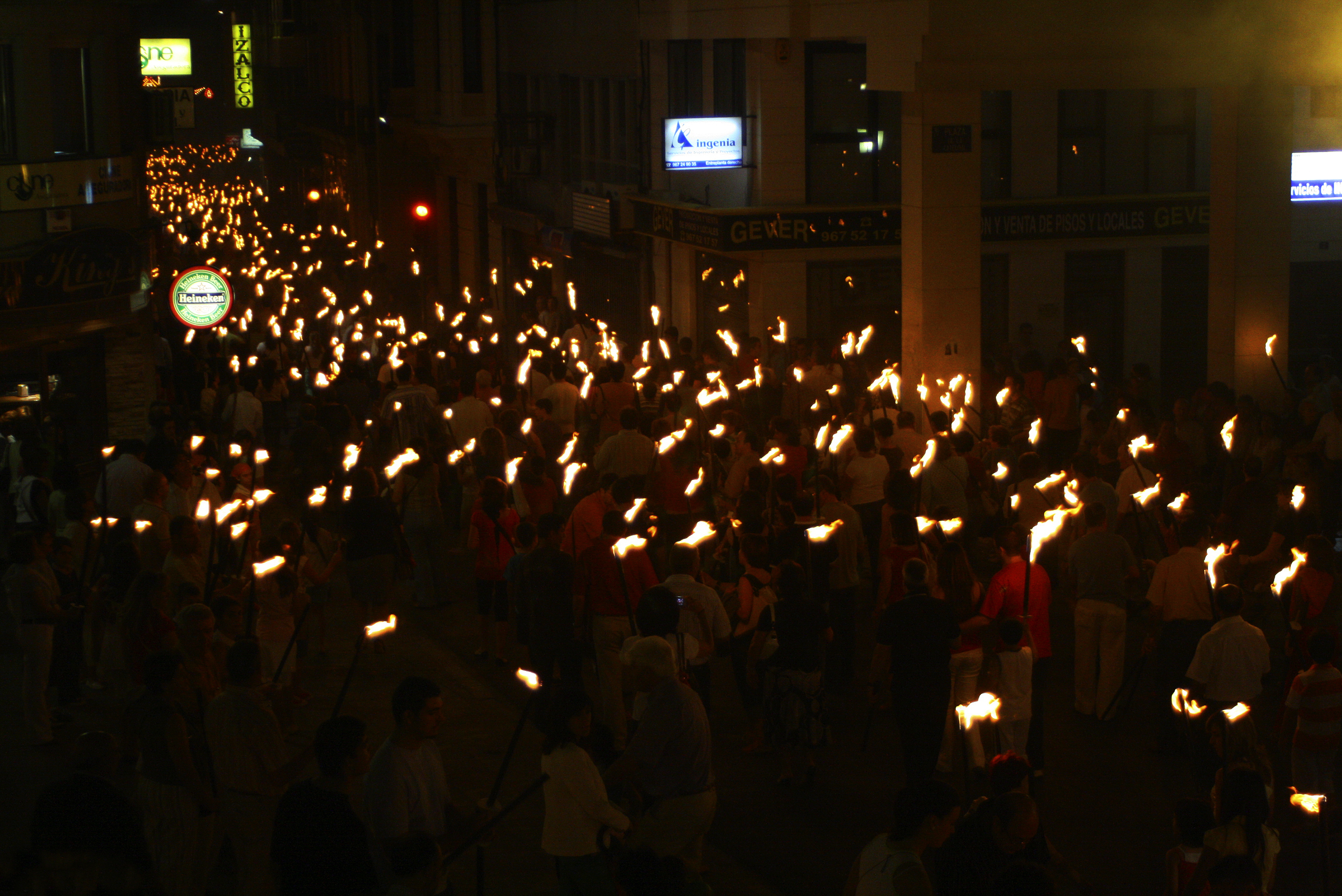
Torchlight procession of the Feast of San Juan.

In the days before 24 June, the feast of John the Baptist pattern of Albacete, the festival is held in his honor. These are accompanied by cultural, sporting and leisure activities in various parts of the city.

The highlight of the festivities take place on 24 June and yesterday, the Midsummer (23–24 June). That night is held torchlight parade from City Hall to the Ejidos Fair, where catches fire in the Bonfire of San Juan, where old belongings and burn stuff. Then a big castle fireworks and a festival in the Fairground is performed.

Finally, on 24 it carries out a pilgrimage in which he moved to San Juan from the cathedral to the Park Tree Festival.

==== Easter ====
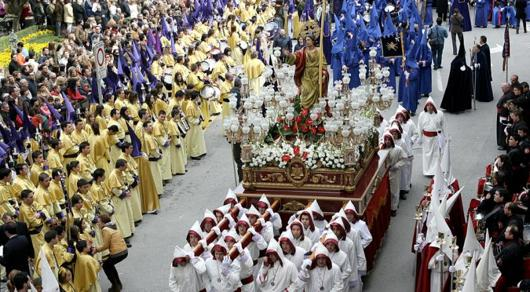
Holy Week in Albacete.

Between Palm Sunday and Easter Sunday is held in Albacete Easter, in which the various brotherhoods in processions through the city, accompanied by the steps and the touch of bugles and drums.

Year after year, the Albacete Easter has gained more prestige, having been classified as Regional Tourist interest. The best processions are held: on Holy Thursday at 12 pm (Procession of Silence) and "Holy" Burial are held on Friday.

==== Carnival ====
The Thursday before Ash Wednesday, Dia de la Mona is celebrated, where traditionally families will eat mona at the Tree Festival Park or the suburban park of The Pulgosa, where children's activities are also held.

The weekend before Ash Wednesday (beginning of Lent) is celebrated as Carnival, with costume parades and humorous singing contests, called chirigotas.

Finally, on Ash Wednesday the Burial of the Sardine is celebrated, in which a sardine-shaped figure (Doña Sardina) is transferred with mourners from the Plaza de Gabriel Lodares to Place of the Hill, where it is tried, convicted and burned.

==== Other celebrations ====
- In Christmas Albacete streets are decorated with lights and ornaments to celebrate the holidays. On 5 January arrival and Cavalcade of the Magi takes place, accompanying the Kings through the streets of the city, from the Asylum of San Anton to the town hall.
- On 17 January, the day of San Antonio Abad, is celebrated San Anton, with the traditional blessing of the animals by the bishop in the Asylum of San Anton. Typically buy some dates and snack churros.
- It is customary in Albacete sing Mayos and Plaza Virgen de Los Llanos at midnight on 30 April to 1 May.
- More and more intensely celebrated the feast of Halloween night 31 October, where parties are common costume or the typical pumpkin s fired.
- In recent years they have spread throughout the city neighborhoods parties.

=== Bullfighting ===
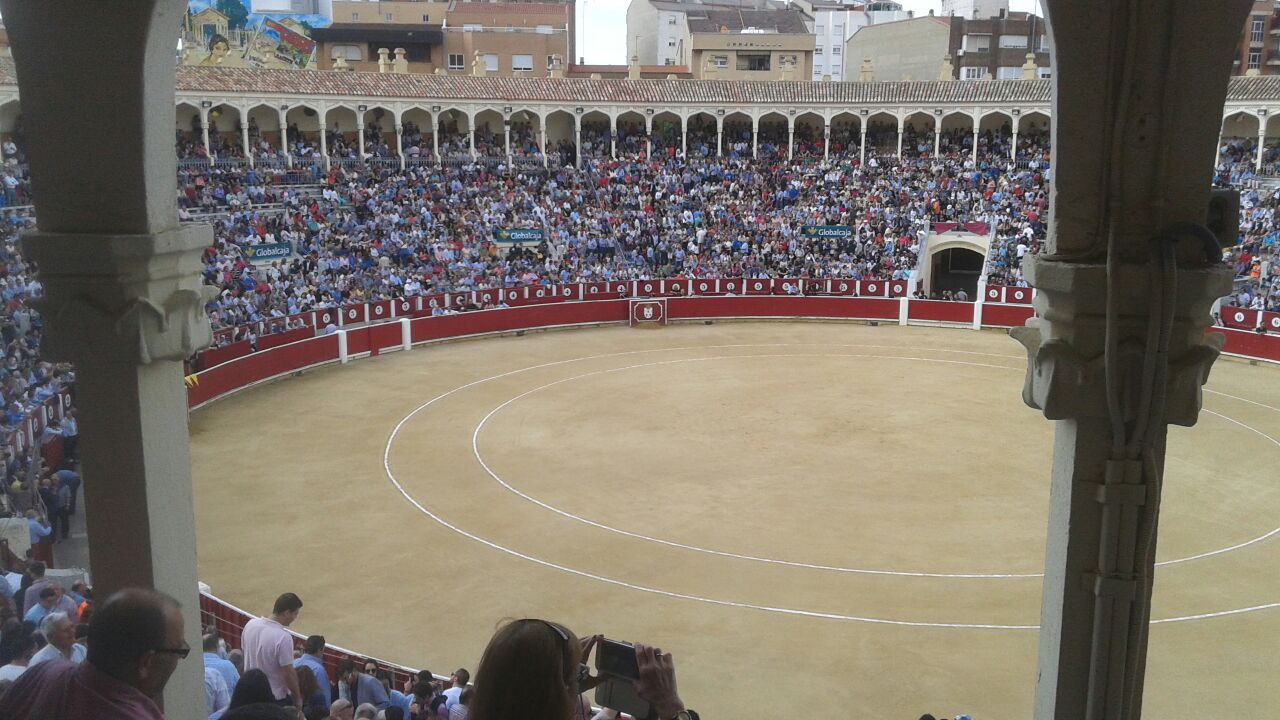
Albacete Bullring, for up to 12 000 spectators.

Bullfighting is deeply rooted in the city of Albacete. Among other issues, the livestock sector has enough presence in the province, where farms are important such as Samuel Flores, Las Ramblas, El Pizarral, Los Chospes, Sonia Gonzalez or Ruiz Yagüe.

The city has a school of bullfighting, the Bullfighting School of Albacete, where some of the bullfighters of the future are trained, and an important Albacete Bullring, second administrative category (although bullfighting events are held here more often than most first bullrings), with a capacity of 12 000 spectators, where the main shows held during 'Bullfighting Albacete' in the month of September. This brings together for ten days leading figures in the bullfighting world, with a significant presence of Castilian-La Mancha bullfighters. Given its large bullfighting tradition, Albacete in 2015 he hosted the First International Congress of bullfighting.

The city also hosts the celebration every year of heifers and traditional Corrida de Asprona, to benefit the Association for the Care of Persons with Intellectual Disabilities and their Families in the Province of Albacete, in which top bullfighters participate.

Meanwhile, in the city of Albacete were born some great bullfighters like Dámaso González, or more currently Manuel Amador, Manuel Caballero and Miguel Tendero.

=== Crafts ===
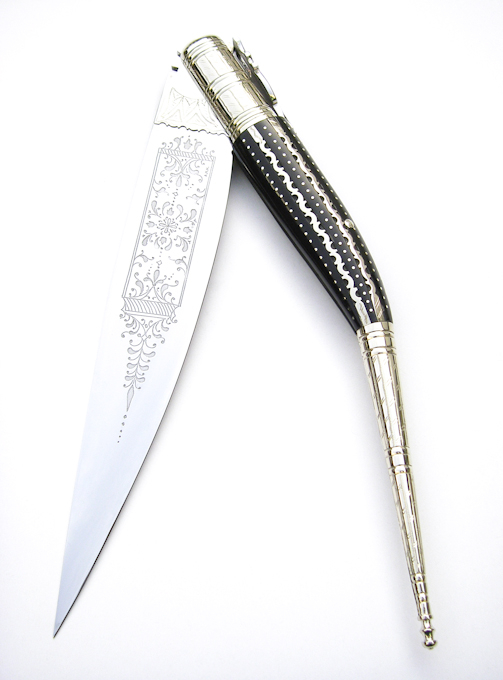
Albacete typical craft knife.

Albacete craftsmanship is closely linked to the knife since the fifteenth century, and features a wide variety of ways that relate to their specific use. The typical Albacete knife has a spring mechanism or ratchet that differentiates it from the rest. The passing of time has shaped and diversified manufacturing the same, leading to the production of scissors, knives, daggers and scalpels for medicine.

Currently the knife industry has modernized and moved largely to the industrial areas of the city, competing with the Asian market. From the union between Albacete and cutlery is the saying that "The Albacete knife is not given, it is sold to a friend at a symbolic price, so that the friendship is not cut off." The history of Albacete cutlery can be visited at the Museum of Cutlery. Craft fairs as the Craft Fair of Castilla–La Mancha or Artisan Cutlery Albacete Fair are held annually in the capital of Albacete.

=== Cuisine ===
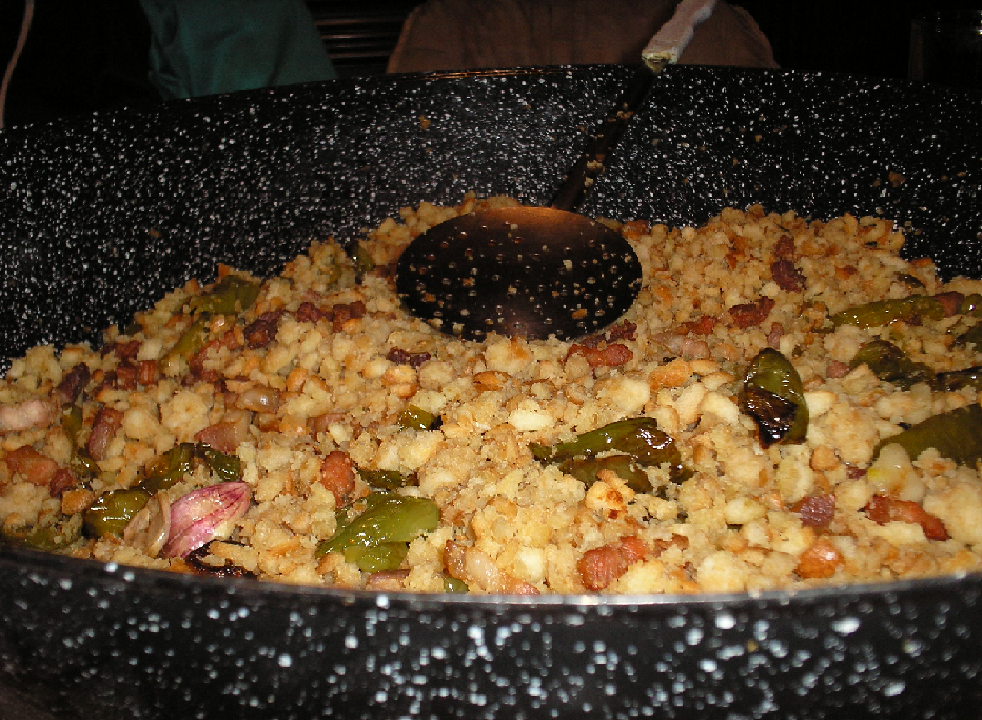
Migas ruleras, Albacete typical cuisine dish.

It stresses the dish of Gazpachos Mancha with game meat, the breadcrumbs ruleras, pastor porridge (with fresh bacon and pebbles or millet flour), the manchego ratatouille or wet during the summer time, combining tomato and pepper, beans with partridge or popular atascaburras whose base is the egg, oil and cod, as well as the garlic mataero. Albacete cuisine is based on ingredients such as meat manchego lamb (which has a PGI) and the manchego cheese (that is name of protected source) or wines (DO La Mancha, DO Almansa, OJ Manchela), whose derivatives create dinners such as crook, the zurracapote, the Marc or dove.

=== Symbols ===
Arms

Shield of Albacete

According to a resolution adopted by the Plenary Council, in a session held on 28 February 1986, the shield of Albacete is described as follows: "The city of Albacete has as its shield: three towers neatly arranged on a silver background with battlements, of stone, saber embroidered in azure, clarified and surmounted by a saber-bat with outstretched wings positioned at the top. It is stamped with a Marquis crown, which is gold with stones and pearls, with eight rosettes (four numbered and the other in pyramids of three pearls, one is visible with two halves of the first kind and intercroppings of the second two)."

But the agreement contained a typo, and saying "three towers well ordered" in heraldry would mean two towers above and one below, or one above and two below. Instead, the descriptions should read "three towers wrongly ordered."

Later the Official Journal of Castilla–La Mancha published on 13 January 1987 Decree 137/86 of 30 December, from the Presidency and Government of the Community Board, which approved the amendment of the Heraldic Shield of the City of Albacete, without making corrections to the description of the ordering of the towers.

Flag

Albacete Flag

According to the resolution adopted by the City Council plenary in a session dated 30 April 1992, the City Council acknowledged the Order of the Ministry of Public Administration, dated 9 March of that year, through which the municipality of Albacete was granted a flag, with the following description:

"crimson red canvas, dimensions 90 cm × 155 cm (35 in × 61 in) with the Albacete Shield encamped in the center, according to the amendment by Decree 137/86 of 30 December. The dimensions of the Shield are 40 cm (16 in) high, excluding the Crown and 56 cm (22 in) if included, with a width of 30 cm (12 in) ".

Anthem

The anthem was launched on 8 September 1926, day of the Virgin of Los Llanos (patron saint of the city), in what was referred to as the "Provincial Anthem feast", which took place at the Plaza de Toros in the Albacete capital. The Municipal Band of Albacete and Spanish Infantry Regiment, among others, performed at this event.

On the night of San Juan in 1975 (day of the patron of the city), the song was re-released at the Teatro Circo de Albacete by the Albacete Municipal Band and the La Mancha Choir, becoming a hallmark of the capital.

== Transport ==
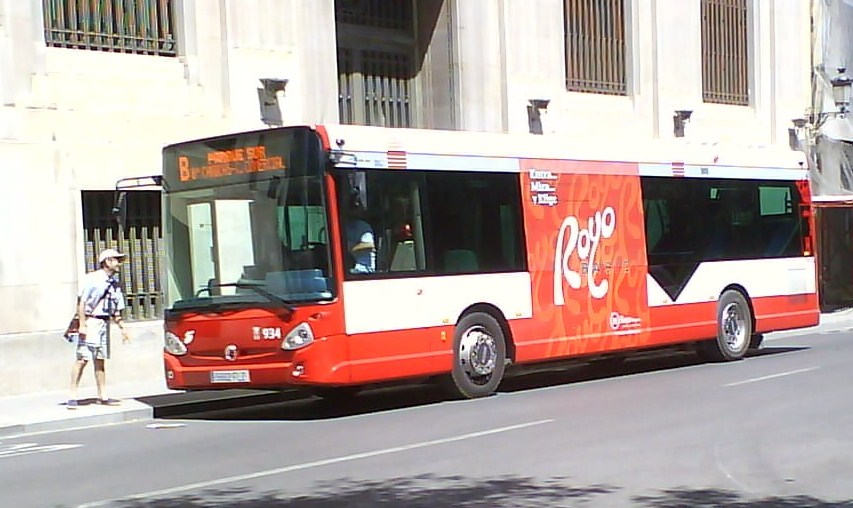
Urban Bus Regulatory Albacete making a stop in the center of Albacete.

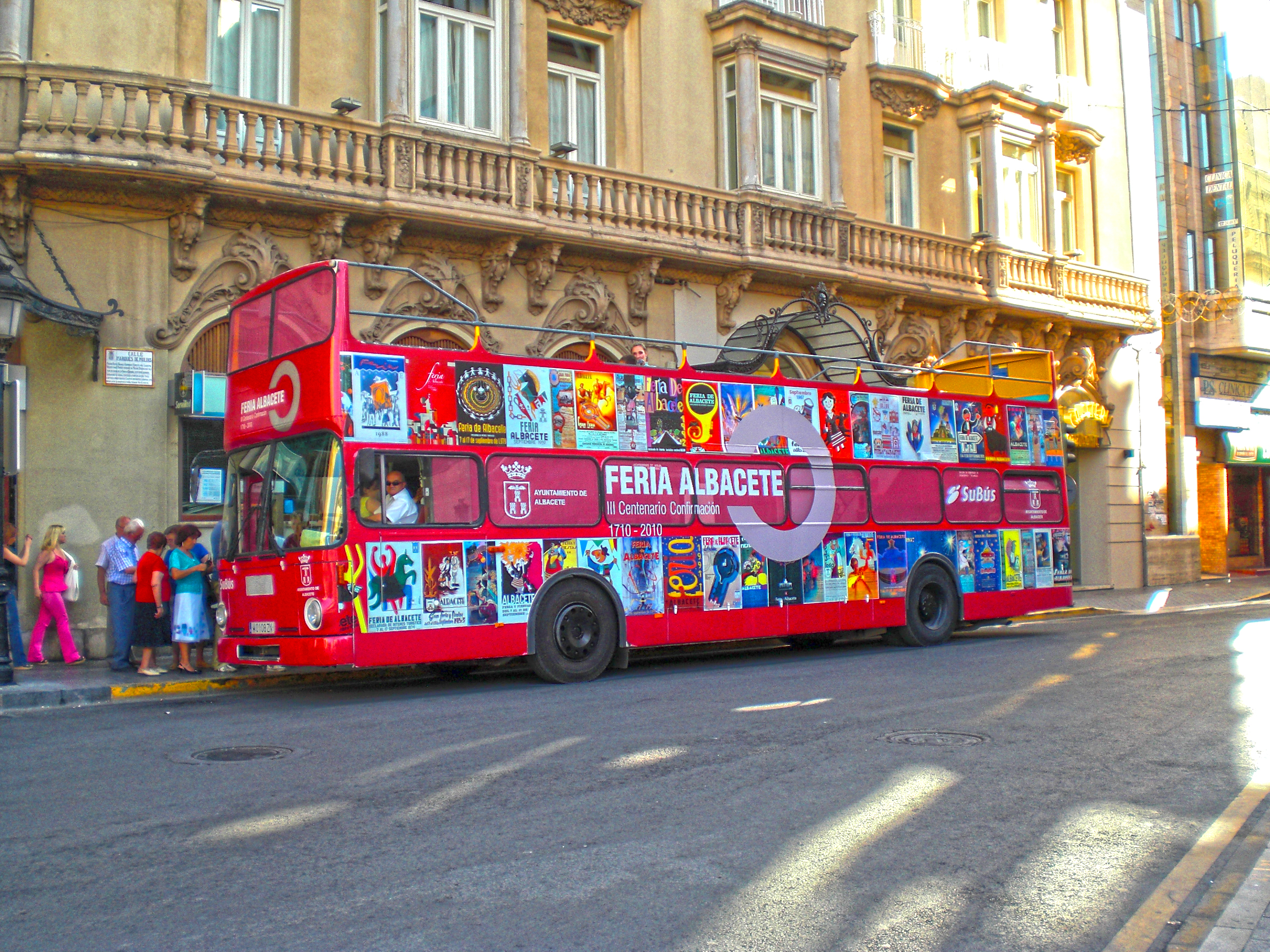
Tourist Bus Albacete, during the celebration of the third century anniversary of the Fair.

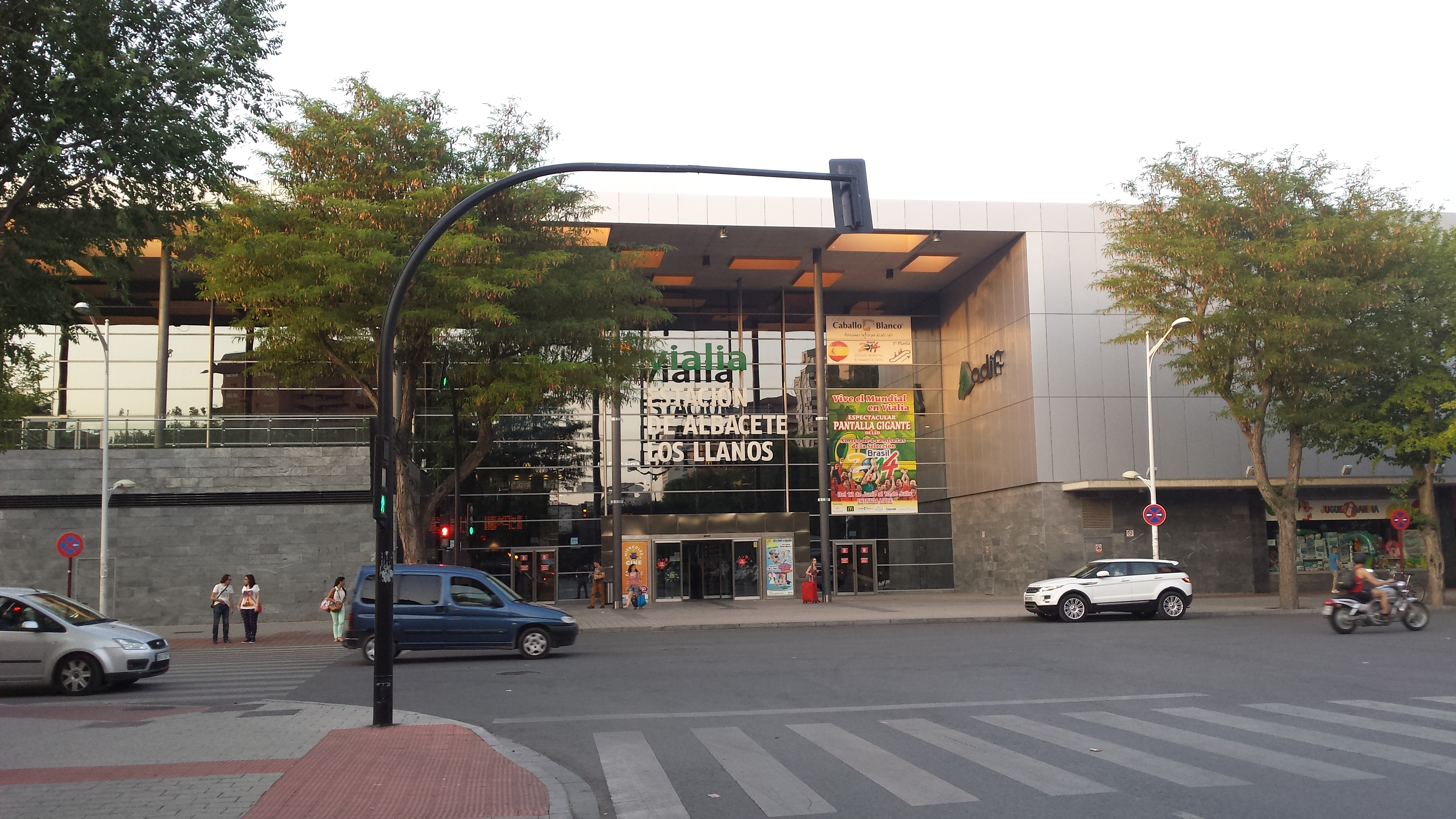
Main entrance of the Albacete-Los Llanos Station.

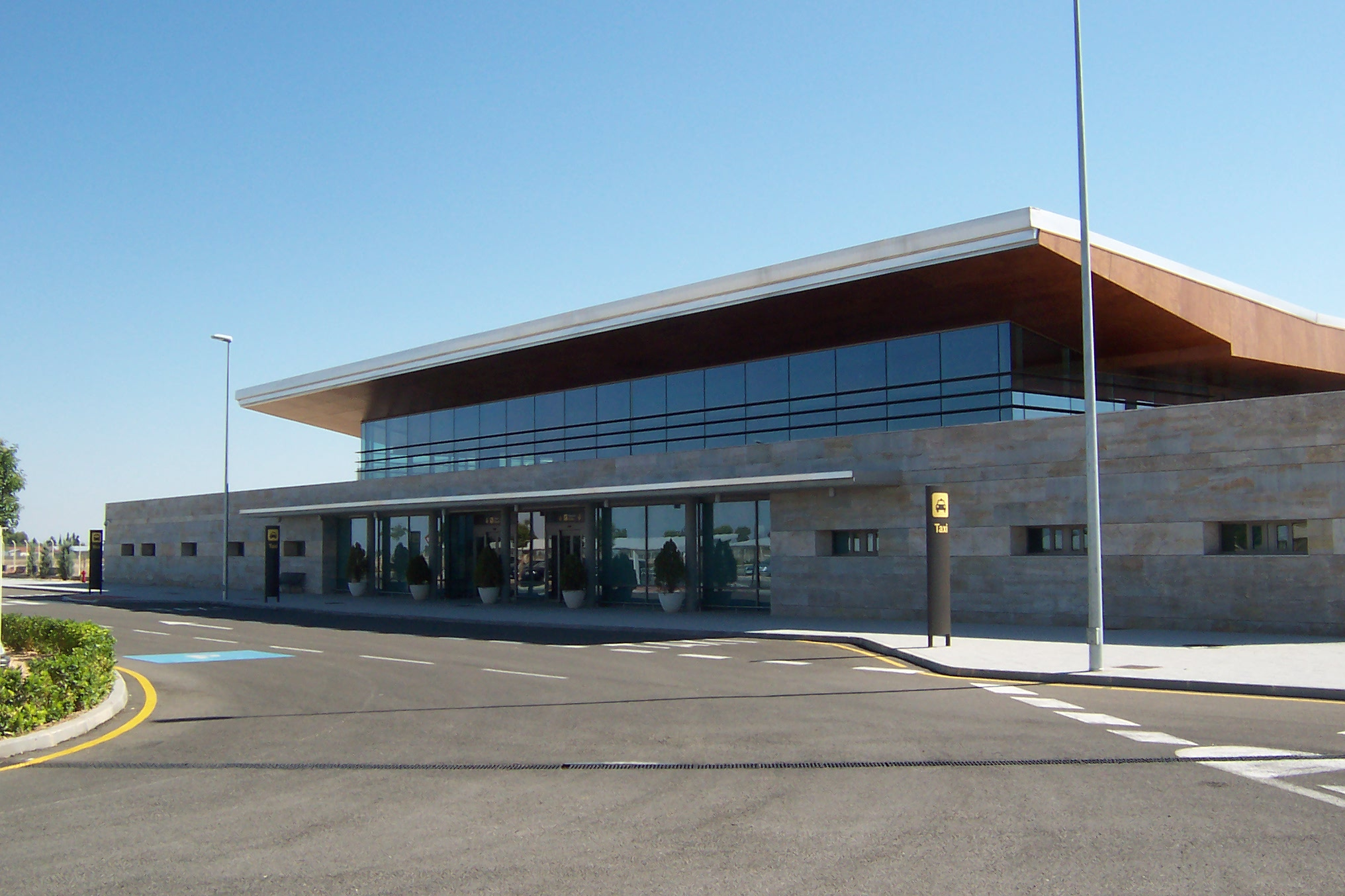
Terminal Albacete Airport.

=== Road network ===
Its strategic location midway between the center of the peninsula, near Levante and Andalusia, makes the city is erected as one of the most important communications hubs southeast Spanish, with motorways to Madrid, Valencia, Alicante, Toledo, Ciudad Real and Murcia (in a few years also Jaén, and Teruel via Cuenca).

=== City buses ===
The city has 10 lines of bus urban (7 of them daily). The buses have a red and white corporate color. Albacete capital currently has 28 vehicles. One of the buses is the model "Labobús", i.e. a modern vehicle with data storage and powered by solar panels. The stop frequency time is 11 minutes a day most lines. The extensive municipality of Albacete has regular bus lines that connect the city from the bus terminal, with major centers.

=== Intercity buses ===
The Bus Station Albacete, managed by EMISALBA (Municipal Infrastructure and Services Albacete SA), is located in the northwest of the city, it has 13,950 m^{2} (150,157 sq ft) (parking included). From the terminal, Albacete has connections through regular intercity bus lines to cities of Valencia, Murcia, Madrid, Catalonia, Andalusia, Extremadura, besides having connections with the major cities of Castilla–La Mancha and municipalities throughout the Albacete.

=== Railway ===
The Albacete-Los Llanos railway station is located on the street Federico García Lorca, very close to the A-31. Inaugurated in 2010, it has extensive shopping and leisure. From the new station ADIF the capital has a wide range of provincial, regional and national connections.

=== Aviation ===
The Albacete Airport (IATA: ABC, ICAO: LEAB), managed by AENA, is 3.9 kilometres (2.4 miles) from the city to the south. Its facilities are very close to the Los Llanos Air Base of Air Force, the Air Arsenal and Air and Logistic Park. The nearest international airports are Murcia Airport, located 167 km (104 mi) south east, Valencia Airport, located 193 km (120 mi) north east and Madrid–Barajas Airport, which is also located 260 km (162 mi) north west of the city.

=== Bicycle ===
Albacete has more than 42 kilometres (26 miles) of bike path. On urban roads in the city, adding to the more than 120 kilometres (75 miles) of greenways, groomed trails, paths or bike lanes.

== Sport ==
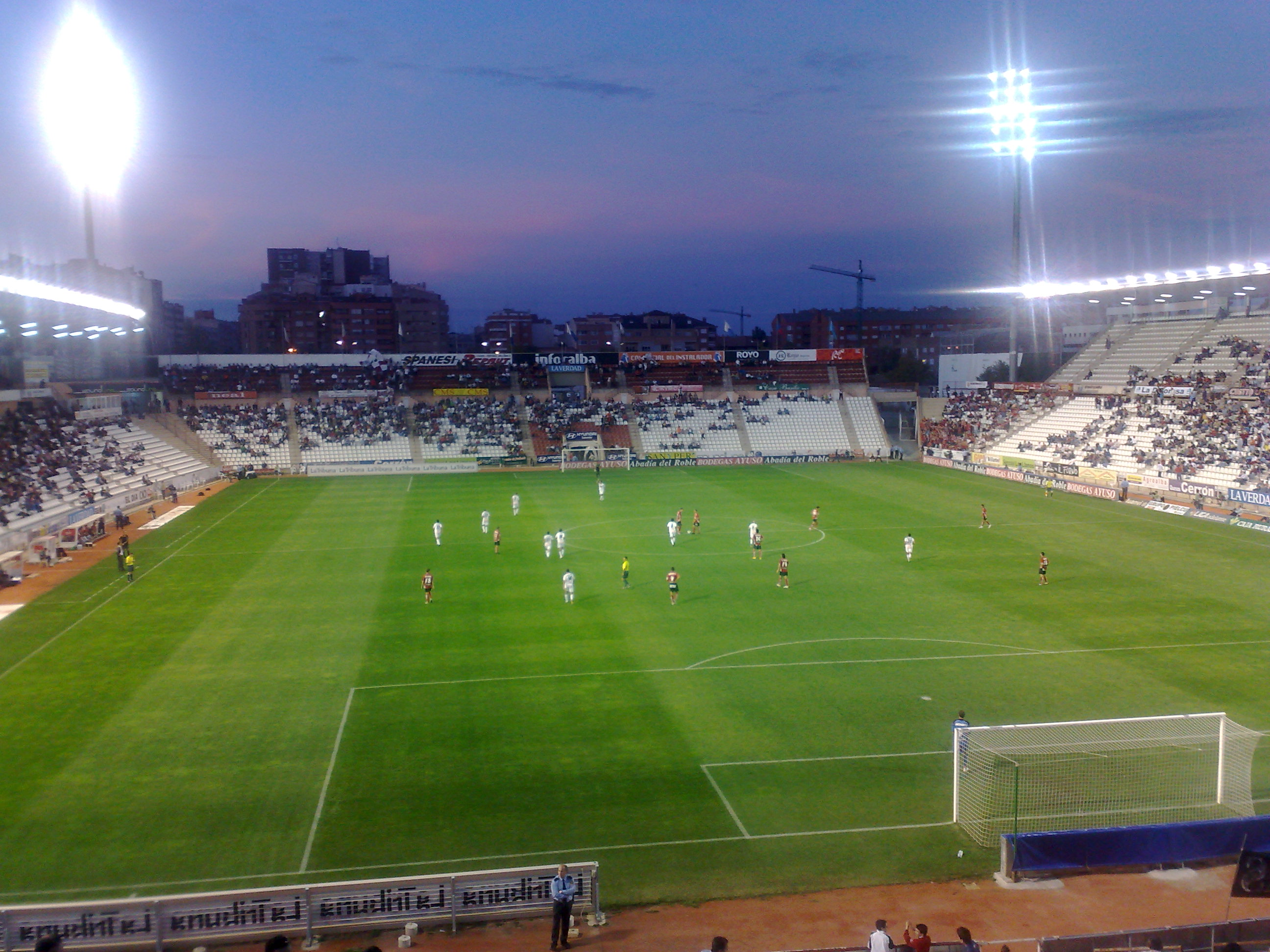
Estadio Carlos Belmonte

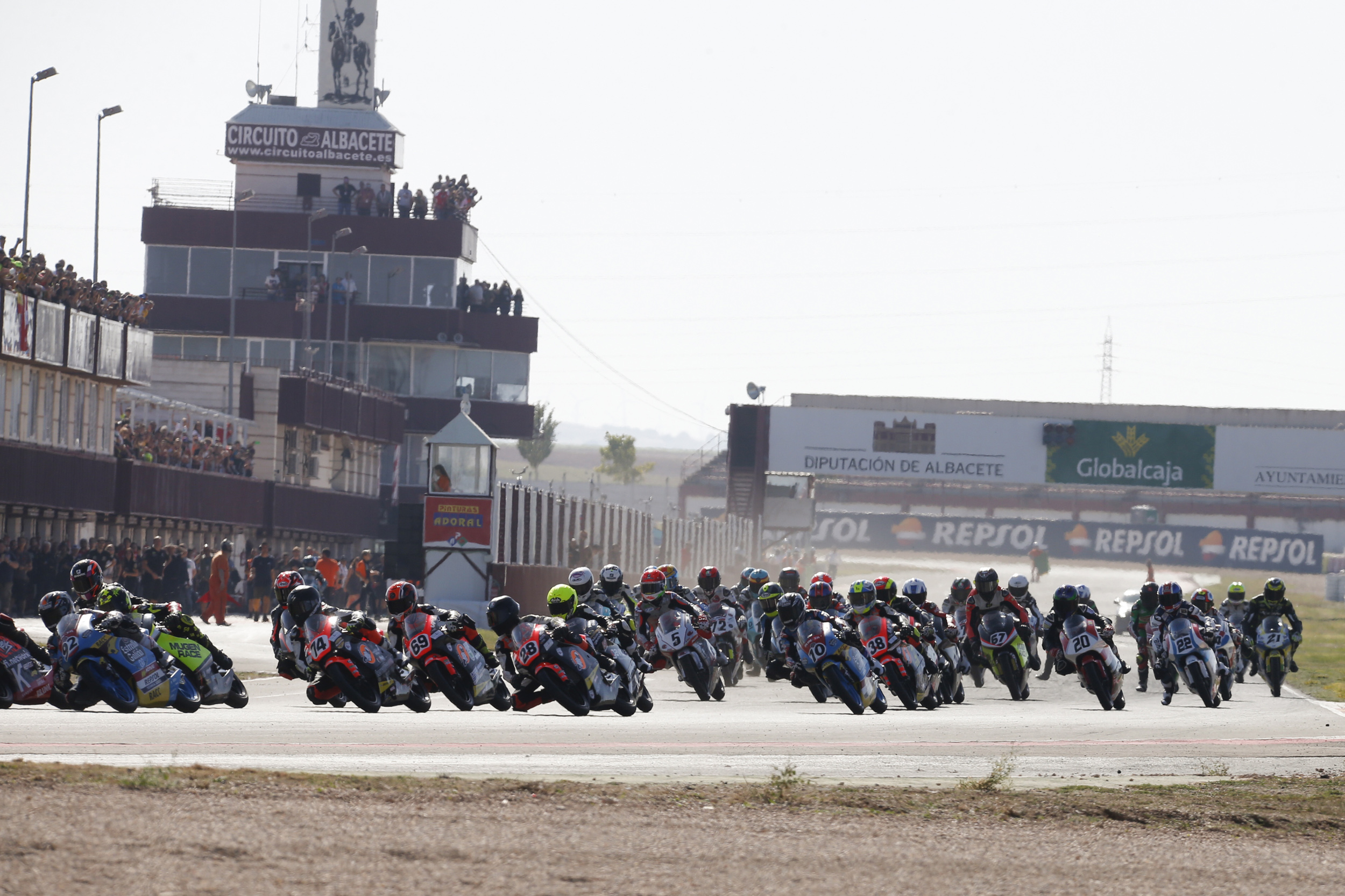
The Circuito de Albacete hosts national and international tests of motorsport

The most successful men's football club in the city is the Albacete Balompié, who plays Segunda Division after playing in Primera Division. In women's football highlights Fundación Albacete, who plays Primera Division.

The city hosts every year the Circuito de Albacete, important evidence as the International FIM CEV Championship. Throughout its history, the Albacete track has hosted events like the World Superbike Championship, the World Endurance Championship, the European Championship Motorcycling or FIA European Truck Racing Championship, among many others. On the Circuito de Albacete have passed and legends from the world of motor as Michael Schumacher, Sebastian Vettel, Fernando Alonso, Valentino Rossi, Jorge Lorenzo, Marc Marquez or Dani Pedrosa.

The Estadio Carlos Belmonte Albacete has hosted five matches to date of the Spain men's national football team. Albacete has also been the scene of the Davis Cup. The Tour of Spain has had as output or goal to the city of Albacete 42 times. Another classic of the city is the International Half Marathon City of Albacete, held in the month of May for a street circuit that runs through the streets of the capital. On 31 December the city dismisses the year with traditional and crowded Carrera de San Silvestre, which highlights the costumes of the athletes.

The city has other major sporting and entertainment venues such as the Albacete Tennis Club or the Club of Golf Las Pinaillas, designed by legendary golfer Severiano Ballesteros.

== International relations ==
=== Twin towns–Sister cities ===
Albacete has reached sister city–twin town agreements with:

- San Carlos, Nicaragua (1992).
- Dahira Bir Ganduz Sahrawi refugee camp, Algeria (1994).
- Vienne, France (1995).
- Reconquista, Argentina (1997).
- La Lisa, Cuba (2002).
- Houndé, Burkina Faso (2008).
- Nanchang, China (2012).
- Udine, Italy.

== Notable people ==
- Alba Redondo (born 1996), footballer for the Spain national team
- Gema Parreño (born 1988), data scientist and programmer.

== See also ==
- List of municipalities in Albacete
- Elvira Fernández–Almoguera Casas, first woman attorney from Albacete
