= Events of Yeste =

1936 armed confrontation in Spain

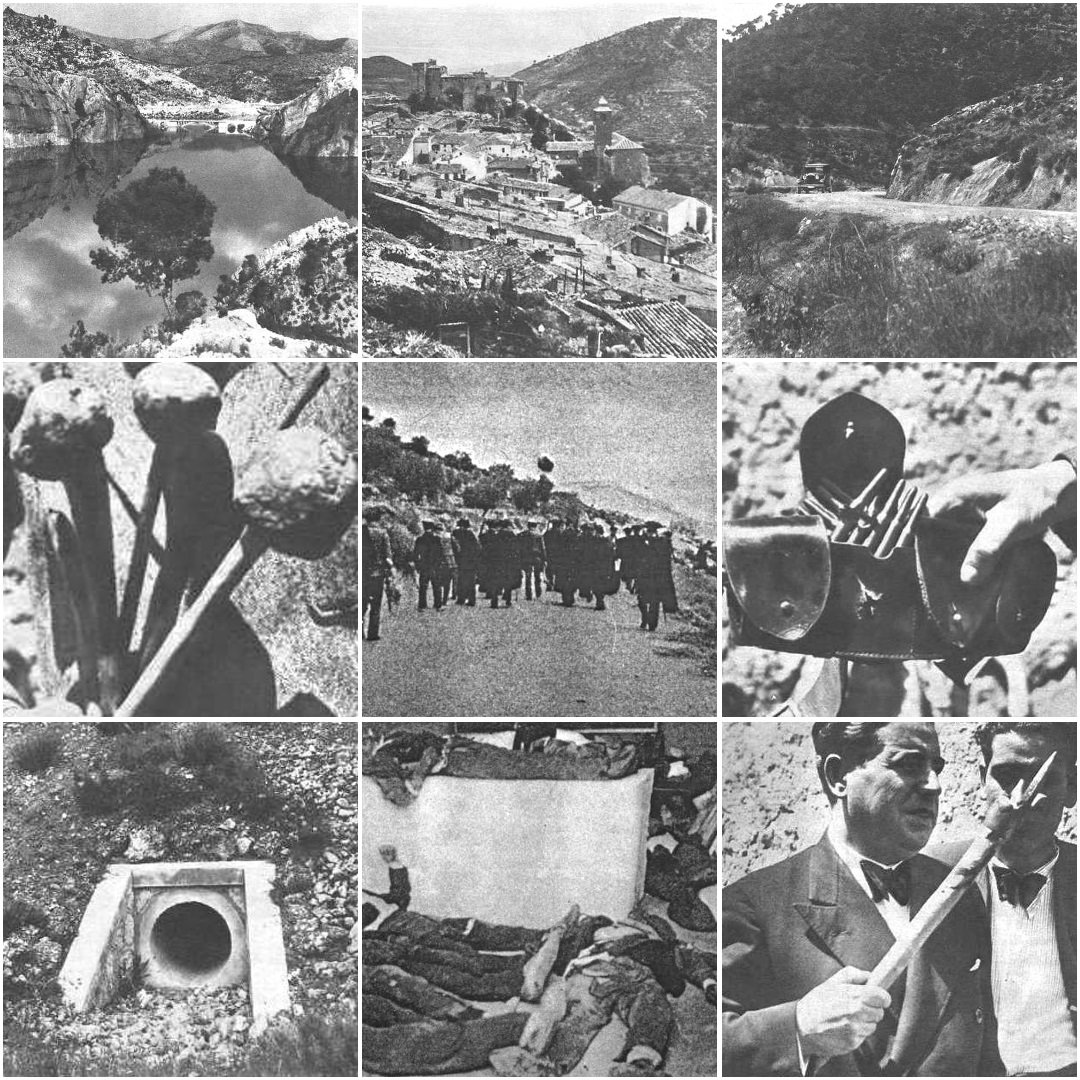

Events of Yeste (Spanish: Sucesos de Yeste) is a colloquial name given to the armed confrontation between Guardia Civil and local agricultural workers and farmers which took place near and in Yeste on May 29, 1936. It was the second-bloodiest incident of this type during the lifetime of the Second Spanish Republic; it left 18 people killed and 29 heavily wounded. Though widely reported by the media, the carnage did not have a major political impact; both the Left and the Right were anxious to prevent unwanted would-be consequences. During the official investigation, criminal charges were prepared against 29 individuals, but due to outbreak of the civil war, no one was sentenced. In historiography the incident is referred either against the background of repression against the working class, or in relation to breakdown of public order during the spring of 1936.

== Background ==
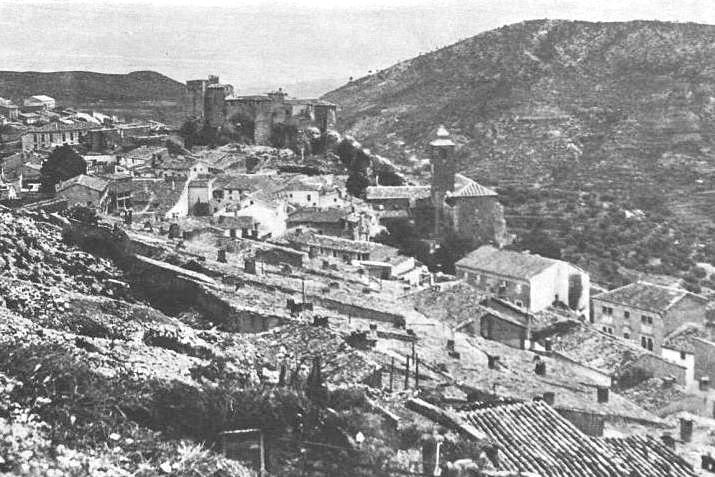
Yeste, mid-1930s

The municipality of Yeste is located in the county of Sierra del Segura, in the Albacete province. At the time it was part of the Murcia region; now it forms part of the New Castile and La Mancha region. Because of its mountainous character and peripheral location, bordering La Mancha, Murcia and Andalusia and away from major communication routes, it remained an extremely remote and poor community; Yeste was its only urban settlement, with some smaller villages scattered around. Like many counties of the region, it was marked by uneven land distribution, with presence of large rural estates on the one hand and numerous small-holdings belonging to local farmers on the other; there were also numerous landless agricultural workers, the jornaleros, living in the area. Its economy was largely dependent upon 2 commodities: olives and timber.

In line with its policy of heavy investments in infrastructure, mostly roads and hydro-electricity, in 1929 the Primo de Rivera regime commenced construction of the reservoir on the Segura river. Following the fall of the monarchy the new republican government continued the works as part of its Plan Nacional de Obras Hidráulicas. With the Fuensanta dam completed in 1933, the reservoir affected both the olive and the timber industry. Numerous plots were cut off from communication and transport of timber became extremely difficult. In July 1933 the farmers affected demanded construction of new road or other estates being offered for swoop. The demand, officially filed by the local ayuntamiento, was rejected by Dirección de Obras Públicas. It is usually suspected that the decision was enforced by Edmundo and Antonio Alfaro Gironda, two major landholders in the area, whose possessions would have been affected. Both were members of Partido Republicano Radical; Edmundo served in the Cortes and Antonio in the Diputación Provincial.

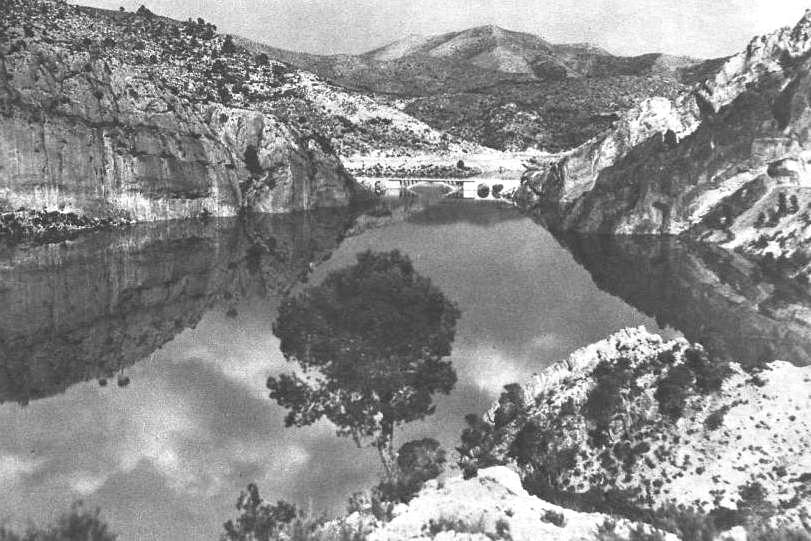
Fuensanta reservoir, mid-1930s

Following the electoral triumph of Popular Front in February 1936 new provincial Albacete authorities tried to address the problem by making some state landholdings accessible, yet it barely improved the position of local farmers and jornaleros, living in the neighbourhood of the Segura reservoir. However, both rural and urban proletariat started to view the electoral victory as the beginning of a massive social change, possibly bordering revolution. Increasingly frequently groups of rural workers declared taking justice into own hands. In the Albacete province cases of seizing land or logging on private estates were increasingly frequent, e.g. in Almansa, Alcaraz and Villamalea. The best known was the case of Bonete of March 1936, which gained notoriety due to confrontation with Guardia Civil and death of one serviceman.

== Antecedents ==
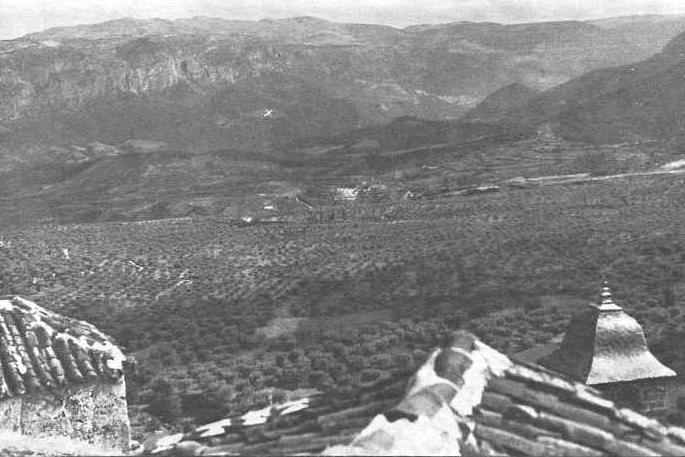
view from Yeste towards the dam; the logging site is marked with X

With the spring weather conditions setting in, rural workers from villages depending upon timber were working on two public estates made accessible by the provincial authorities, known as Dehesa de Tus and La Solana del Río Segura. They cut down some 9,000 pine trees and approached limits of the estates marked. Then, following incoming news about farmers occupying private property in other locations of the province, some time in mid-May a large group of males, numbering between 50 and 80, commenced logging of pine trees on the estate known as Umbría del Río Segura, on the southern bank of the water reservoir. The estate was not public but the property of Antonio Alfaro, who purchased it in 1917. The males themselves were mostly dwellers of the La Graya village, on the right bank of the Segura; they would later claim that the estate has traditionally belonged to the village until it was fraudulently taken over “por parte de los caciques”. During over a week, some 11,000 pine trees have been cut.

The Alfaro brothers alerted the authorities, and the news reached the newly appointed civil governor, Manuel Maria González López; he was member of the presidential Izquierda Republicana party, held few civil governor jobs in 1932–1933, and assumed the Albacete office in March 1936. González López decided to send Guardia Civil reinforcements to Yeste, the place which normally hosted only a very small detachment. At the same time Jefatura Hidrológica Regional, the local branch of state body responsible for hydrological services, also alerted the governor. According to their claim, massive logging was likely to have gross adverse effect on local hydrological regime, including operations of the Fuensanta dam. The governor contacted the mayor of Yeste and briefed him on developments and the intention to deploy Guardia Civil. The mayor thanked for intervention and on May 27–28 pledged full co-operation with the forces of order.

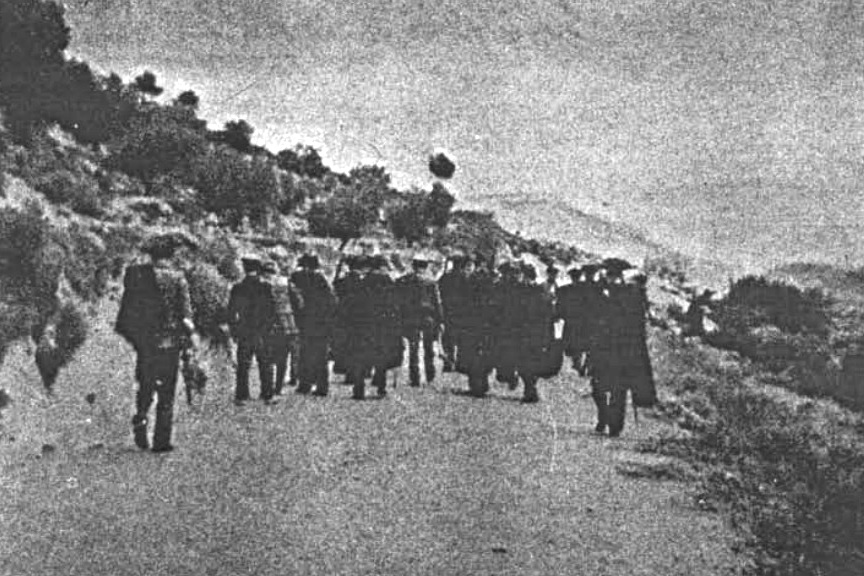
Guardia Civil on the Yeste - La Graya road (later picture)

On May 27 a detachment of Guardia Civil were sent from Yeste to La Graya; it consisted of a corporal and 6 agents. They were greeted with hostility; anticipating trouble the corporal sent one man to Yeste requesting reinforcements, but the serviceman was apprehended on his way and held as a hostage. However, the commander in Yeste and the alcalde got wind of the developments and made it to La Graya, where the mayor, Germán González Mañas from PSOE, tried to pacify the locals. He left during the evening assuring the Civiles, who would stay in La Graya during the night, that the situation was under control. However, the house hosting the detachment was surrounded by the dwellers who appeared preparing for an assault. A few warning shots dispersed the crowd. On May 28 the Yeste Guardia Civil commander sergeant brigadier Felix Velando with approval of the governor sent to La Graya reinforcements, which consisted of a sergeant, 2 corporals, and 14 agents. This force detained 6 individuals considered key troublemakers, with the intention to transport them to Yeste the following morning.

== Confrontation ==
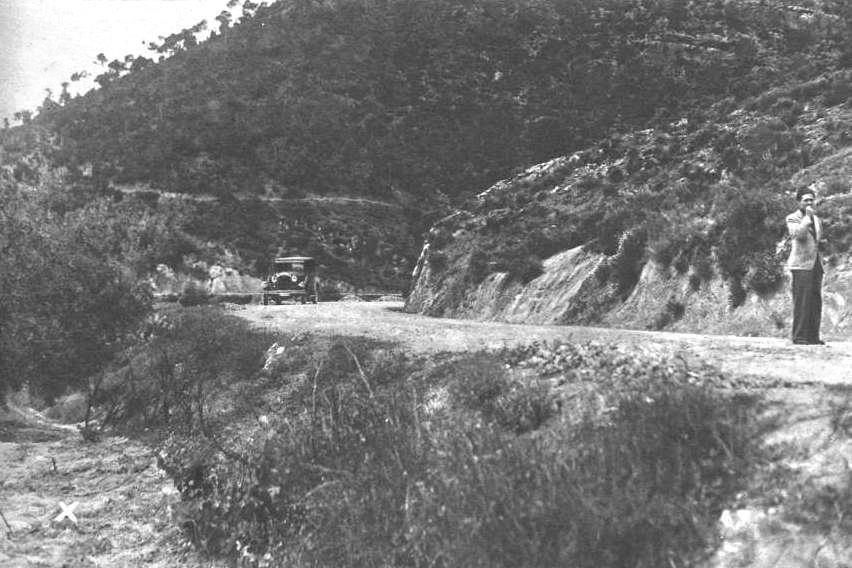
road to Yeste, curve where the fatal confrontation took place

- early hours of May 29: some Civiles moved from La Graya to Yeste to inform local command that the detainees would be transported during the morning hours
- 8 AM: 16 Guardia Civil servicemen and the detainees left La Graya for Yeste, almost immediately surrounded by hostile crowd which demanded liberation of those arrested. The distance between La Graya and Yeste is some 12 km; the convoy proceeded among insults
- morning hours: news about detention were already known in the area, and militant locals from some other villages were approaching the road between Yeste and La Graya
- later morning hours: Velando approached the alcalde and asked him to pacify the crowd. The alcalde refused, noted that belligerent hundreds could not be detained, and claimed there was no point trying unless the detainees were set free. Eventually the Guardia Civil commander agreed. He was assured that when set free, the detainees would be monitored by the alcalde and his men and would show up for interrogation. Velando hurried from Yeste down the road to pass the orders to the convoy, already approaching up the road from the Segura
- around 10:30 AM: the convoy was some 2 km away from Yeste, accompanied by increasingly militant and hostile crowd, when it was reached by Velando, descending from the opposite direction. In an extremely heated moment, Velando ordered his men to free the detainees. After this happened, the Civiles proceeded towards Yeste. At the next curve along the mountainous road, at the spot known as La Cervera, they were confronted by aggressive crowd armed with various improvised tools, including bludgeons and hooks. Following the first scuffle numerous servicemen were wounded and fell; one was killed with a hook and the locals took his rifle. At this point the Civiles opened fire. According to later investigation, they kept firing for around a minute

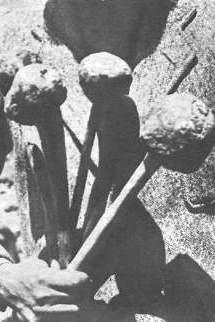
bludgeons used by local farmers

- 10:30 until 12: the crowd dispersed on the slope of the hill, both up and down the road. In chaos and conditions of close combat, the Civiles kept firing and pursuing their opponents. An unspecified number of locals, possibly between 6 and 12, have been shot. The servicemen sustained new injuries, but no fatalities
- 12 until 3 PM: the Civiles kept clearing the area until they reached Yeste; one of the locals was shot at the outskirts of the city
- afternoon: the forces of order kept combing the city looking for the assailants. There was no combat recorded, yet some sources claim that there were locals maltreated, tortured or perhaps killed. Those detained were being placed under guard in premises of the Yeste castle, which started to serve as temporary prison
- evening: Guardia Civil reinforcements, requested earlier, arrived from Albacete, led by the provincial GC commander, Ángel Molina Galano
- night hours and May 30–31: tens of people were arrested. Detainees were being interrogated, often brutally and possibly using tortures. Corpses of the locals killed were gathered and following makeshift procedures, including cursory forensic inspection by local medical staff, they were hurriedly buried in a shallow common grave at the outskirts of the city

== Aftermath ==
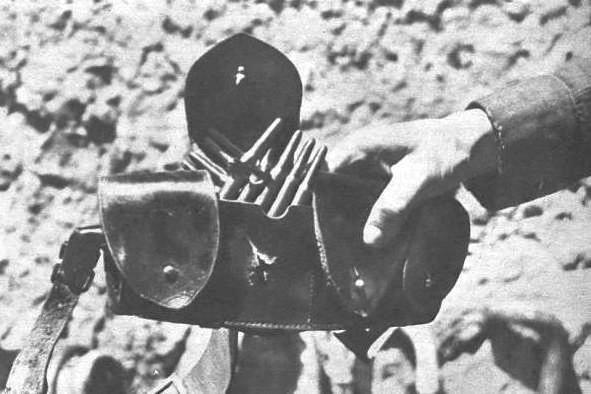
Guardia Civil belt collected at the spot by investigators

The news about dead and wounded has been passed on to the civil governor shortly afterwards, though it is not clear exactly when. Nationwide press published first information already on May 30, though with few details, some of them erroneous, and only estimate death toll. The civil governor, accompanied by some officials, arrived in Yeste on June 2, 1936, which marked the beginning of the official investigation. At the same time José Prat, Amancio Muñoz de Zafra (both PSOE) and Antonio Mije (PCE) arrived in Yeste and carried out interviews with the city dwellers. The carnage was also discussed at close meetings of various parliamentary groupings; the intention was to work out the strategy how to handle the issue during the parliamentary session scheduled on June 5, when the Yeste carnage was to be discussed in the chamber. Before that, the prime minister Casares Quiroga entrusted the Supreme Tribunal judge, Gerardo Fentanes Pontela, with the mission to investigate the issue.

The Cortes session dedicated to the Yeste massacre lasted less than an hour and was surprisingly brief compared to days spent on debates in 1933, when the chamber discussed the Casas Viejas carnage. It was the result of the strategy adopted by both the Left and the Right. The Popular Front groupings were anxious not to weaken the position of the Casares government, supported by the alliance. Hence, its representatives put the blame on individual Guardia Civil commanders, and declared the landholders, especially the Alfaro brothers, “responsables morales”. CEDA politicians remained mute, apparently anxious not to trigger an onslaught on the entire formation of Guardia Civil; this might have led to escalation and demands to abolish the entire service, perceived by the Right as one of the last remaining pillars of law and order in the increasingly bolshevized Spain. The Republican MP, former Minister of Public Works, claimed that during his tenure he drafted a plan to address the Segura reservoir issue, but it has not been acted upon by the following cabinets. Finally, the Minister of Interior Moles Ormella declared that thorough investigation would be carried out and would-be culprits among the servicemen sanctioned. However, the press followed the case during some 2 weeks, until mid-June.

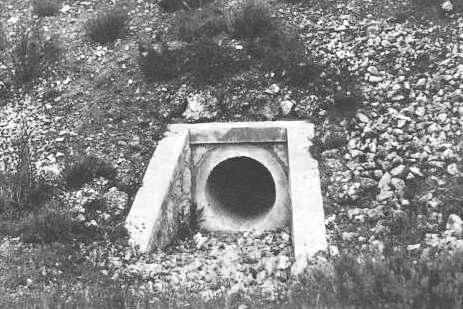
water culvert, where locals sought shelter during the shooting

Fentanes Pontela took over the investigation from Federico Rodríguez Solana, judiciary of the Audiencia Territorial de Albacete. He soon ordered exhumation of the corpses and concluded that forensic analysis has not been carried out properly. Fenantes ordered another post mortem, and afterwards allowed the relatives to have private burial ceremonies. He raised charges against two Yeste physicians, Juan Llopis and Joaquín Fernández Sánchez, who were detained. On June 14 the civil governor González López was dismissed, yet only to be nominated for the same post in Toledo. The Guardia Civil NCO commander in Yeste, Félix Velando Gómez, who was wounded in the head during the melee, remained in hospital until mid-June, when promoted to alférez, he was transferred to Comandancia de Oviedo. In mid-July Fenantes leaked to the press the results of his investigation, about to be closed and amounting already to some 1,000 pages. He confirmed the number of victims. He also advised he would bring charges against 29 individuals. He also concluded that the incident was caused by the crowd, who assaulted servicemen on duty, and that the servicemen opened fire in the last possible moment. As the July Coup and the Civil War broke out in few days, it is not known what the fate of all individuals charged was.

== Numbers ==
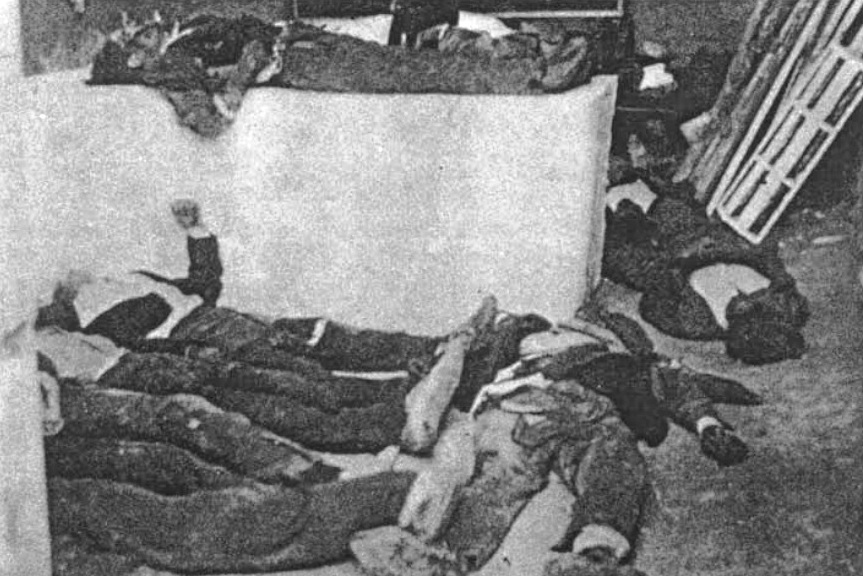
corpses temporarily gathered in provisional storage house

The episode produced 18 fatalities: 17 locals and 1 guardia. One source claims that except one case, all locals were young males, though the list published later in Mundo Obrero featured also one man in his 60s and one in his 40s. According to newspapers among the dead there was a secretary of the local Juventud Socialista, a secretary of the local Casa del Pueblo and a member of the Yeste town council, yet historians mention only the latter and teniente de alcalde of Yeste.

The number of heavily wounded as established by the official investigation was 29, among them 15 locals and 14 Civiles; historians mention 16 wounded servicemen. However, it is generally understood that among the locals the number of these wounded or injured was much higher; many of them preferred not to seek medical assistance fearing this would lead to their incarceration. Also many other Civiles suffered injuries which were not classified as “heavy”.

It is not clear how many have been detained. Initial press reports referred to “hundreds”. The official figure elaborated during the investigation was 59, yet it is likely that some of these detained on May 29–30 might have been released before the official investigation commenced. Formal charges were brought against 29 individuals, including 2 doctors, at least few Civiles (including Velando) and the rest having been local farmers. There is no information on any juridical sentence passed.

== Epilogue ==
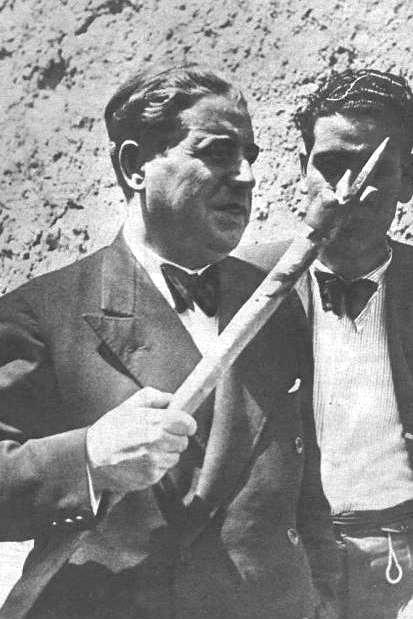
Fentanes, demonstrating hooks used

- Angel Molina Galano, the Guardia Civil provincial commander, was involved in preparations to the July coup; leading the insurgents he took control of Albacete and most of the province, but following combat he eventually surrendered to loyalist forces. He was taken POW, placed in a prison ship in Cartagena, and killed in one of the sacas in August 1936
- Antonio Alfaro Gironda, one of the landholders whose estate has been breached, apparently fearing would-be follow up of the massacre, moved to his estate in the province of Jaén. Following outbreak of the civil war he was detained there, trialled by a revolutionary tribunal, declared guilty of anti-Republican conspiracy, sentenced to death and executed in August 1936
- Edmundo Alfaro Gironda, another landholder whose estate has been breached, was detained in Albacete once the coup there was suppressed. He underwent trial by the local Tribunal Popular, was declared guilty of anti-Republican conspiracy, sentenced to death and executed in August 1936
- Gerardo Fentanes Pontela, who led the official investigation, after the July coup remained loyal to the republican government. He kept serving in Tribunal Supremo until the end of the war, and then went on exile to France. He died of natural causes in Bordeaux in 1944
- Juan Moles Ormella, the Minister of Interior during the incident, lost his post when the Casares Quiroga government collapsed in July 1936. He did not hold any major post during the war, afterwards moving to France and Mexico, where he died in 1945
- Manuel Maria González López, the Albacete civil governor, later moved to the similar post in Toledo. During the siege of the Alcazar he remained inside, according to some sources as a hostage, according to others he joined voluntarily. Afterwards he moved to his native Galicia and practiced as a lawyer, to die in 1975
- Félix Velando Gómez, sergeant brigadier who commanded the Guardia Civil forces in Yeste, served in Oviedo shortly prior to outbreak of the civil war. In late August 1936 the Madrid government expelled him from service. In June 1939 as teniente he was posted from Comandancia de Leon to this of Albacete. His later fate is unknown
- Germán González Mañas, the alcalde of Yeste, was last mentioned in relation to the massacre, when charges were about to be brought against him; as mayor he was replaced by Jesús Ramírez de Arellano. Neither the press nor historiography provide further information on him afterwards

== In historiography ==
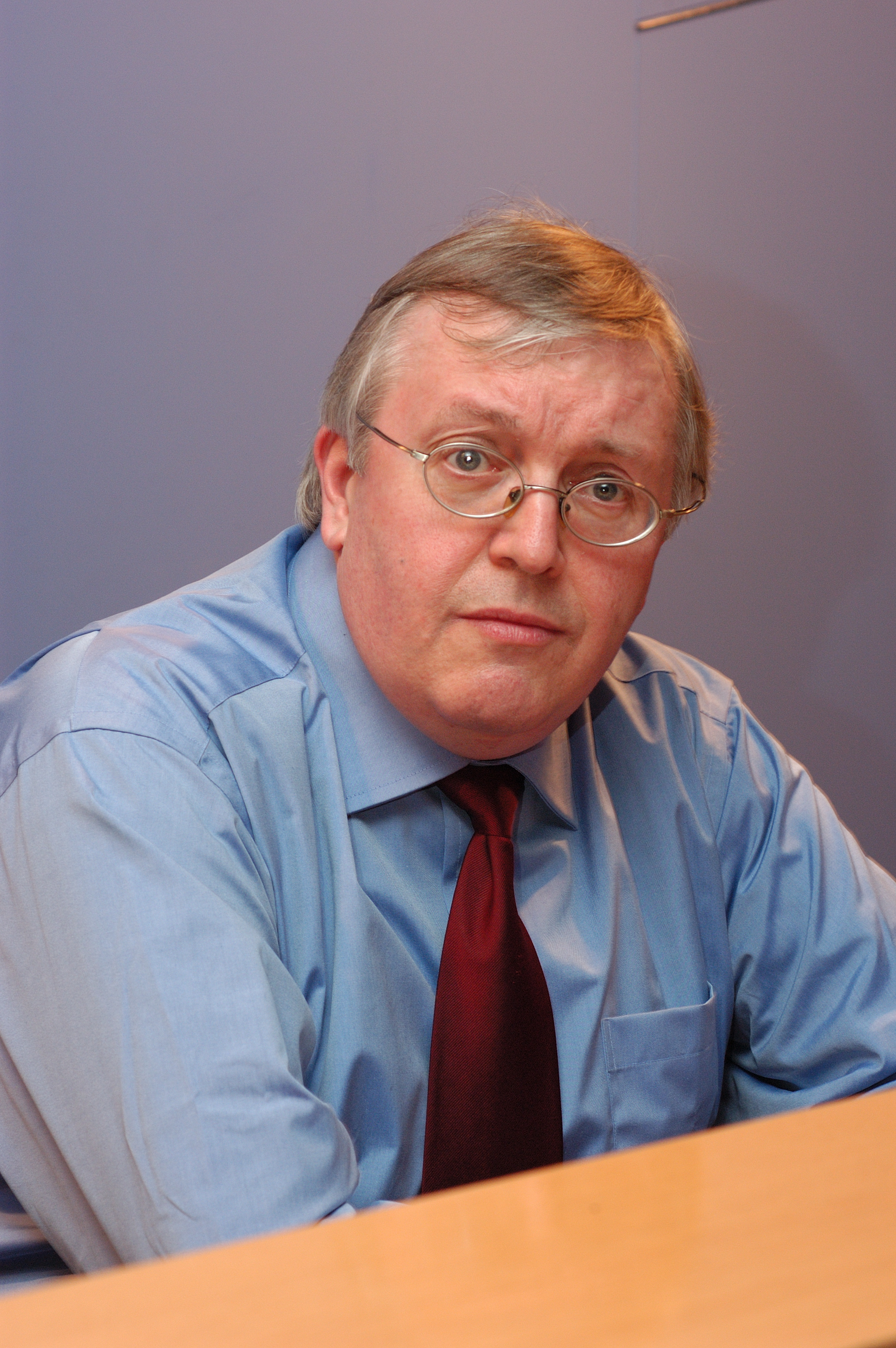
Paul Preston

In historiography the Yeste massacre is presented from different perspectives, not only with somewhat conflicting factual accounts, but also with various threads either prioritised or marginalised.

The 170-page booklet monograph by Manuel Requena Gallego (1983) dedicates 6 pages of text to the actual event; the rest focuses on social and political background and the aftermath. This is also the case of a recent, smaller monograph, a 25-page article by Francisco José Peñas Rodríguez (2020). Some 3 page are dedicated to the actual episode, and the remaining text highlights social conflict, firm grip of large landholders on provincial political life, caciquismo, position of the Alfaros, efforts to block the investigation, and alleged blackout imposed upon the incident during Francoism. Paul Preston (1994, 2011) puts social conflict on the foreground and largely repeats arguments of La Graya farmers, pointing to “old communal grounds” and influence of the Alfaro, “most powerful local cacique”; he notes that earlier attempts to sort out the problem “had infuriated the local Right”, which led to the tragic climax, and that afterwards the restraint on part of FNTT, the socialist agricultural syndicate, prevented “bloodshed on a large scale”. He presents the episode along the chain of events which prompted “the large landowners” to “look to the military for their protection”, which eventually led to the July coup. Francisco Espinosa Maestre (2007) pictures the Yeste carnage against the background of traditional brutality of Guardia Civil and also invokes the coming civil war when noting that it was “la última matanza de campesinos antes del golpe militar”; he implies that assuming no civil war, the bourgeoisie state would have probably swept the case under the carpet.

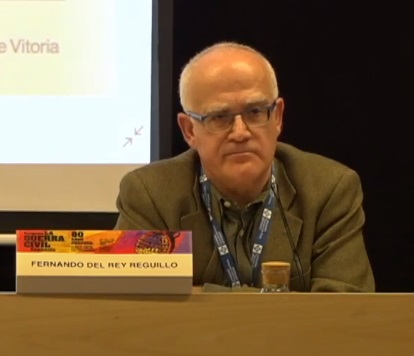
Fernando del Rey

Stanley G. Payne (2020) discusses Yeste as part of his narrative on breakdown of public order during the spring of 1936, though he points also to extreme poverty and desperation in some sections of the rural population, its increasingly aggressive and radical stance following the Frente Popular electoral victory, and Guardia Civil having been a formation neither trained nor equipped properly to deal with cases of such unrest. Similar approach prevails in work of Rosa Ma Sepúlveda Losa (2003) and in the latest work on political violence during the spring of 1936 by Fernando del Rey Reguillo and Manuel Álvarez Tardío (2024). The authors present the incident as resulting from grave social problems, militant stand of the working masses, encouraged by perceived radical political change, and deficiencies in organisation of security forces; they also highlight the policy of Frente Popular governments and their Ministers of Interior, in their opinion increasingly tolerant and permissive when it comes to left-wing violence. Some scholars draw far-reaching conclusions, e.g. for Edward Malefakis (1971) the restrained response of radical Left after the matanza is the proof that there were no plans for immediate revolution in place, as otherwise the episode would have been an excellent justification for a proletarian rising. Some synthetic works, even by very recognized scholars like Javier Tusell (2007), provide wrong figures.

== In public memory ==
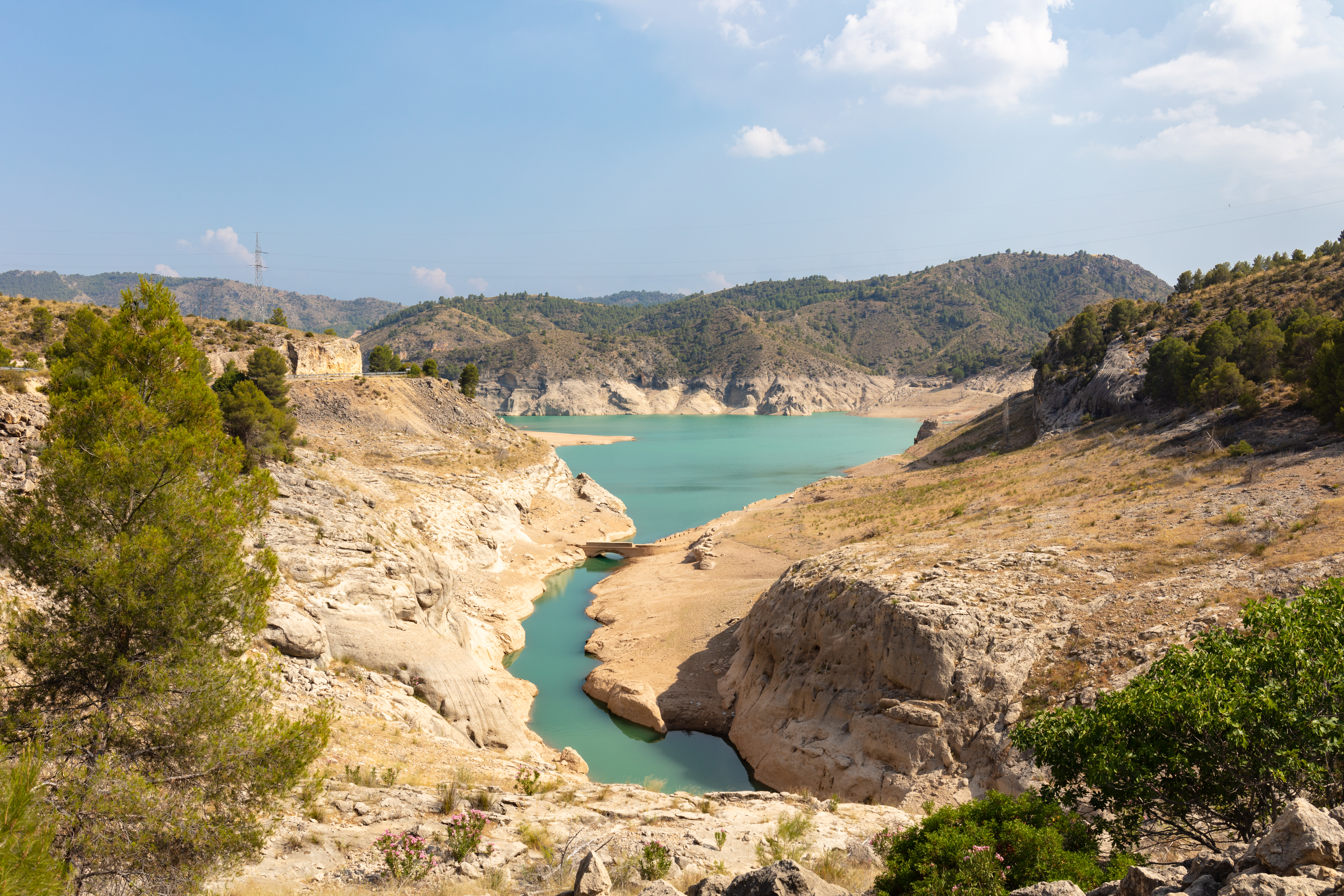
Fuensanta reservoir today

During the July coup the Yeste Guardia Civil sided with the rebels and detained local authorities in the castle, but the place was soon seized by the loyalists. During civil war and early Francoism Yeste recorded an extraordinarily high rate of repression, both by the Republicans and Nationalists, compared to the neighbouring municipios; a contemporary historian tends to view it as related to the May 1936 episode. Reportedly some time early after the war a commemorative cross has been erected at the curve where the fatal confrontation occurred; according to one source it recorded the Guardia Civil victim “murdered by the Red mob”, but another source suggests it was rather an unrelated stone cross, which recorded 5 “caballeros españoles” killed by “canalla roja”. In 1963 Juan Goytisolo visited Yeste and intended to interview people, but he encountered the wall of silence; the locals spoke in murmurs and evaded the questions. He later incorporated this experience into his novel, partially revolving around the 1936 incident, published in Mexico and titled Seños de identidad (1966). As late as in 1981 one resident feared that the government might deprive him of his pension in case he speaks out.

Currently there is no commemorative cross, stone or plaque referring to the May 1936 carnage, either on the road, in Yeste, in La Graya or elsewhere. There are no commemorative events organised on May 29 either by local authorities or independent organisations. The Yeste tourist office, part of the local town hall, does not mention the episode, though on some tourist sites focused on history the massacre is highlighted as the one which “provoked the Civil War”. Militant left-wing sites clearly and with no reservations present the episode as unprovoked slaughter by repressive police forces in service of bourgeoisie and capital, and some evoke the civil war logic by claiming that the conflict began precisely in Yeste. The Fuensanta dam and the reservoir are still operational and though in recent years the Spanish authorities have demolished over 100 dams during a campaign to restore natural water regime, so far there is no indication that Fuensanta is to be removed as well.

== See also ==
- Casas Viejas incident
