= Spanish coup of July 1936 in the Albacete province =

1936 coup during the Spanish Civil War

July 1936 coup in Albacete
- Part of the Spanish Civil War
Date	19–26 July 1936
Location	Albacete province, Spain
Result	Republican victory

Belligerents
(Spain) loyalists (later known as Republicans)	(Spain) rebels (later known as Nationalists)

Commanders and leaders
(Spain) José Balibrea Vera	(Spain) Ángel Molina Galano (executed)

Strength
c. 4,000	c. 1,000

Casualties and losses
unknown	unknown

The 1936 coup in the Albacete province was part of a nationwide military-civilian revolt. On 19–20 July 1936, the rebels easily gained control of the entire province, but it remained an isolated island of insurgency surrounded by areas controlled by the loyalists. On 21 July, loyalist troops advancing from the Levantine coast made first incursions into the province, and with little combat, they advanced west during the next few days. Following a few hours of urban fighting, on 25 July, the rebels surrendered in Albacete, and soon the entire province fell back under government control.

The battle for the province was fought by relatively minor forces. The rebels amounted to slightly more than 1,000 men. Though they were mostly civil volunteers, their core was formed by some 350 Guardia Civil troops; the overall command was with the provincial Benemérita head, comandante Angel Molina Galano. The loyalists were some 4,000 men. Most of them were members of workers' militias, but their strength relied on 6 companies detached from the army, navy and Carabineros units; they were led by comandante José Balibrea Vera. The number of casualties is not clear, though the KIAs probably did not exceed 100-200 men.

The coup in the province was marked by some unique features. Albacete was one of 28 provincial capitals where the rebels seized control, but one of only 2 where they were soon defeated by the loyalists. Unlike in most other provinces the coup was staged mostly by Guardia Civil, and unlike in most others, it was defeated by the military. The loyalist takeover of the province represented the largest single territorial gain of the Republicans during the entire Civil War.

== Background ==
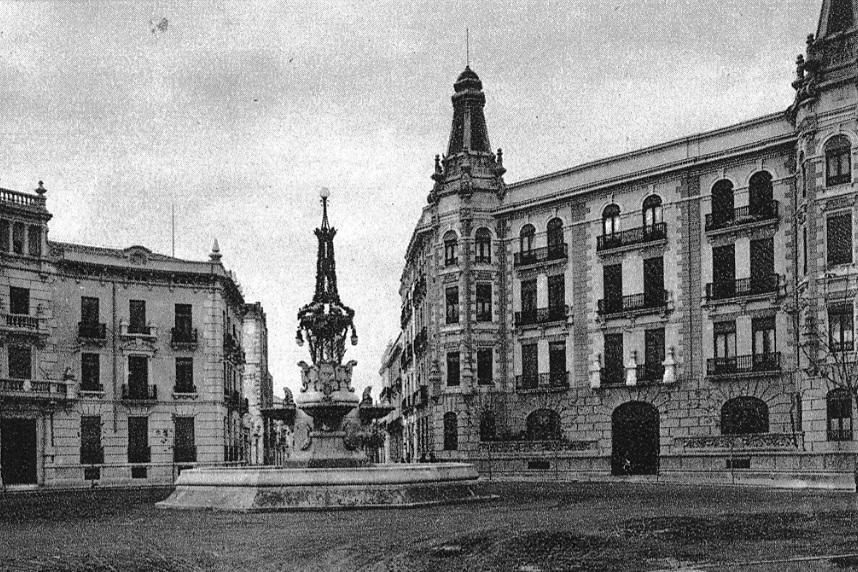
centre of Albacete, early 1930s

The province of Albacete (at that time within the region of Murcia) formed part of the Valencia military district, home to III. División Orgánica. There were only two small military units in the province: a detachment of the Valencian 10. Infantry Regiment, which manned the Chinchilla prison, and the staff of a minor air base in La Torrecica. The key armed formation of the province was Guardia Civil; out of its 350 servicemen some 150 were stationed in Albacete, 50 in Almansa, Hellín and Villarrobledo each, plus minor units in few other locations, especially Alcaraz. There was also 1 company of Guardia de Asalto and a minor detachment of Guardia de Seguridad deployed in the province.

Albacete was traditionally a moderate and rather monarchist province. During the 1936 elections the counter-revolutionary bloc prevailed (54% of the votes) over Frente Popular (42%). However, social tension in the province was running high, especially in the countryside. Presence of large rural properties and great number of landless rural workers, largely organised in the socialist agrarian unions FNTT, proved fertile soil for conflict. The land reform failed to defuse tension, which erupted in the spring of 1936, first in Bonete and then in Yeste. In both cases farmers occupied parts of large landholdings, and in both interventions of Guardia Civil led to violent clashes and fatalities; the Yeste incident produced 18 deaths and caused a minor governmental crisis. The civil governor of the province was sacked and replaced with an Izquierda Republicana politician, Manuel Pomares Monleón. It seems that he was unaware of the military plot and focused rather on Falange, with a plan to stage preventive detentions of key party militants. As the province was mostly rural the urban workers’ organization were not a major force and unlike in many other provincial capitals, after the death of Calvo Sotelo there were no militia patrols on the streets.

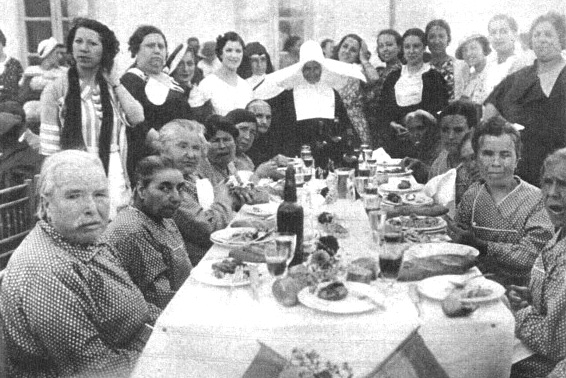
the rich meet the poor; charity dinner in Albacete, mid-1930s

The backbone of military conspiracy in the province was formed by members of the local Guardia Civil branch. Some sources claim that its head was teniente coronel Fernando Chápuli Ausó, though others maintain that the “alma de alzamiento” was rather the provincial commander of the Benemerita, Ángel Molina Galano. Another person heavily involved in the plot was the former Guardia Civil commander in the province, Alfonso Cirujeda Gayoso. It is not entirely clear whether the military commander of provincial troops, Enrique Martínez Moreno, was among the plotters, whether he merely tolerated it or whether he had only vague idea of the conspiracy unfolding. The most active civilian was Fulgencio Lozano Navarro, the provincial Falange jefe. Already in May their network was mature enough to confirm to the Valencia conspiracy command that the province was prepared to rise. The plan was a typical one: it envisioned taking control of key buildings in Albacete and major provincial cities, detaining civil governor and left-wing alcaldes and declaring the state of war. The plotters intended also to deploy small detachments along the key railway line, which connected Madrid and the Levantine coast.

== The coup ==
Albacete was seized by rebel conspirators on 19 July; there was no opposition encountered, civil authorities were deposed and replaced by new appointees. On 20 July, the rebels took control of other major provincial cities, Villarrobledo and Hellín, while Almansa remained in stalemate due to indecision of the local insurgent commander. The climax of rebel power fell on the early hours of 21 July, when the insurgents controlled almost all towns of the province and the key railway line from Madrid to the Levantine coast. Their strength was slightly more than 1,000 people, mostly civilian volunteers and some 400 Civiles, Asaltos and other uniformed men. On 22 July, the loyalist units advancing from Alicante and Murcia seized Almansa and Hellín and on 24 July they arrived at the Eastern outskirts of Albacete; they amounted to some 4,000 men, mostly workers militia with 6 companies of uniformed servicemen from the army, navy and carabineros. Following few hours of urban combat the rebels surrendered around mid-day on 25 July. By dawn of 26 July all the province was firmly back under the government control.

=== Saturday 18 July ===
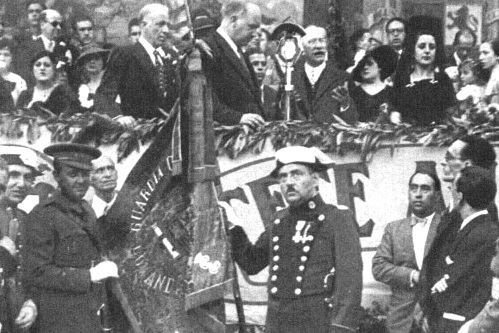
Albacete Guardia Civil

During the morning hours of 18 July, Chápuli ordered concentration of provincial Guardia Civil troops in Albacete; during the day their detachments started to arrive in the provincial capital. Molina ordered the civilian conspirators to head for military barracks, while Cirujeda departed for Madrid to get in touch with the conspiracy command and gather more information; he would be later detained in the capital. Martínez Moreno moved his command post to the Guardia Civil headquarters. In some smaller provincial cities, e.g. in Hellín, civilian conspirators gathered either in private premises or in Guardia Civil posts.

The civil governor Pomares Monleón and the mayor of Albacete Virgilio Martínez Gutíerrez remained in touch with Madrid but during telephone conversations they reported nothing suspicious. At a public rally later during the day they declared total loyalty to the government. In the afternoon the provincial Guardia Civil commander Molina received the phone order of general Pozas, Inspector General de Guardia Civil, to send reinforcements to Madrid, on which he defaulted. In few locations, e.g. in Alborea, local Falange activists were detained and transported to the Albacete arrest.

=== Sunday 19 July ===
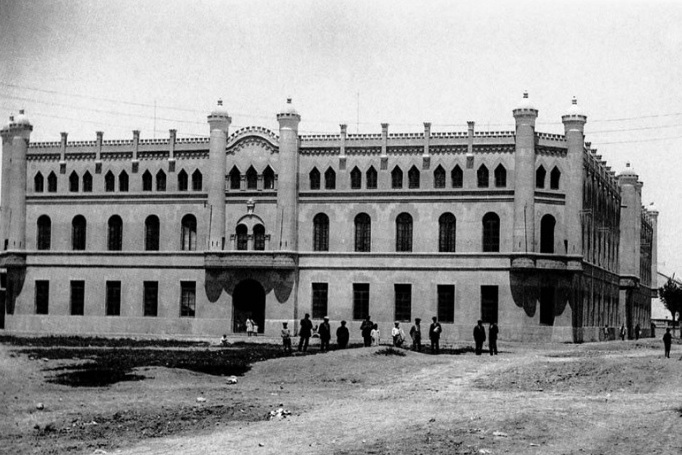
Guardia Civil barracks, Albacete

During the night Chápuli conferred by phone with conspirators in neighboring provinces of Jaén, Ciudad Real and Murcia; some authors claim he realised that Albacete was likely to be isolated, yet decided to proceed. In the early hours of 19 July the Guardia Civil units picked up extra munitions and equipment from the Albacete warehouses; shortly before mid-day Martínez Moreno declared the state of war in the province. Molina entered the civil governor building and detained the civil governor together with some other Frente Popular personalities; a local military, comandante Valerio Camino Peral, was nominated the new civil governor. Guardia Civil took control of key buildings, including the main post office, the railway station, radio broadcasting site and CAMPSA headquarters; they occupied also Casa del Pueblo and detained a number of left-wing activists. The mayor was initially also detained, but after having declared support for the rebels he was soon set free; however, a local physician Aurelio Romero was appointed a new mayor. Head of the provincial diputación, Eleazar Huerta, was not detained; he was replaced with a local lawyer, Juan Poveda Garví. A few hundred civilians, mostly members of Falange, were armed and deployed on patrol duties.

In the second and third largest cities of the province, Hellín and Villarrobledo respectively, there was no unrest recorded except for some workers militia patrols taking to the streets. In the fourth largest city, Almansa, the head of Guardia Civil Isaac Martínez Herreros occupied the town hall building and deposed the mayor; however, he then withdrew most of his troops back to the barracks and did not deploy detachments at key points of the city. In the fifth largest provincial city La Roda there were some minor incidents before the insurgents took control. The rebellious Guardia Civil units and some civilians seized the La Torrecica airfield. Right-wing militias took action also in some minor locations like Alborea, where the Falangists detained the day before returned to the city released from the Albacete arrest and together with the civiles started to patrol the streets.

=== Monday 20 July ===
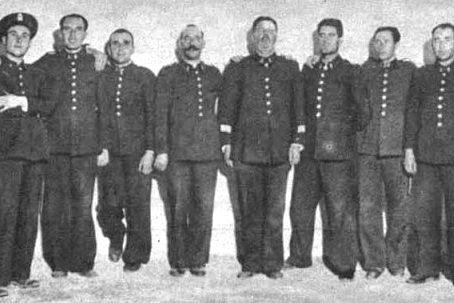
Guardia de Asalto servicemen detained by rebels, Albacete

In the early hours of 20 July, Pozas called Albacete and demanded explanations regarding the state of war declared; as he was offered only vague explanations the government realized the provincial capital was in the rebel control. The workers declared general strike but there were no violent encounters recorded. As the rebels seemed firmly in control of Albacete, they were in position to despatch troops to seize minor locations, especially along the Madrid-Cartagena railway line. Perhaps the most important one was an expedition of a few truckloads of Guardia Civil to Minaya, which seized by the rebels served later as a shield protecting the province from minor milita attacks originating in the province of Ciudad Real, mostly in Quintanar de la Orden. By the end of the day the right-wing militias at times assisted by Guardia Civil took control of Abengibre, Alborea, Balazote, Cenizate, Elche de la Sierra, Fuente-Álamo, La Gineta, Jorquera, Madrigueras, Mahora, Peñas de San Pedro, Pozo Cañada and Yeste; in some of these locations, e.g. in Yeste, alcaldes declared themselves in favor of the insurgents. The only major combat was recorded in Pozo Cañada, leaving 5 left-wing militiamen dead.

The key development in the province of the day was the rebel success in the largest cities after Albacete, Villarrobledo and Hellín. In the former Guardia Civil and right-wing militiamen deposed the mayor and declared the state of war with no major difficulty; in the latter the Benemerita, which since the day before remained in the barracks and was increasingly challenged by the gathering crowd, took to the streets. Led by captain Serena Enamorado the unit dispersed the crowd, deposed authorities and nominated the new alcalde. Almansa remained in sort of a stalemate; Guardia Civil remained mostly withdrawn in the barracks, while the deposed alcalde returned to the town hall and local workers declared general strike. The local Izquierda Republicana deputy Vicente Sol managed to convince the rebel commander Martínez Herreros to gather all his men in the barracks; once he did, telephone lines were cut and the premises were surrounded by the workers’ militia.

By the end of the day the insurgents seemed firmly in control of almost entire province, or at least most of its towns and cities. Apart from the gridlocked Almansa another exception was Chinchilla, where the small army detachment remained loyal to the government; because the town was an important communication junction, its loyalist garrison posed a logistics problem for the rebels. Also the neighboring rural areas, especially around Pozo-Cañada, Ontur and Montealegre, were roamed by some 70 loyalists pushed out of Pozo Cañada. An attempt to send reinforcements to Almansa, headed by teniente Edelmiro Vergés Gilabert, did not find a convenient way around Chinchilla, engaged in skirmishes with the group and had to withdraw to Albacete. Also, many villages remained a no-man's land; in some like Golosalvo the conspirators awaited assistance from major centers and did not take action.

=== Tuesday 21 July ===
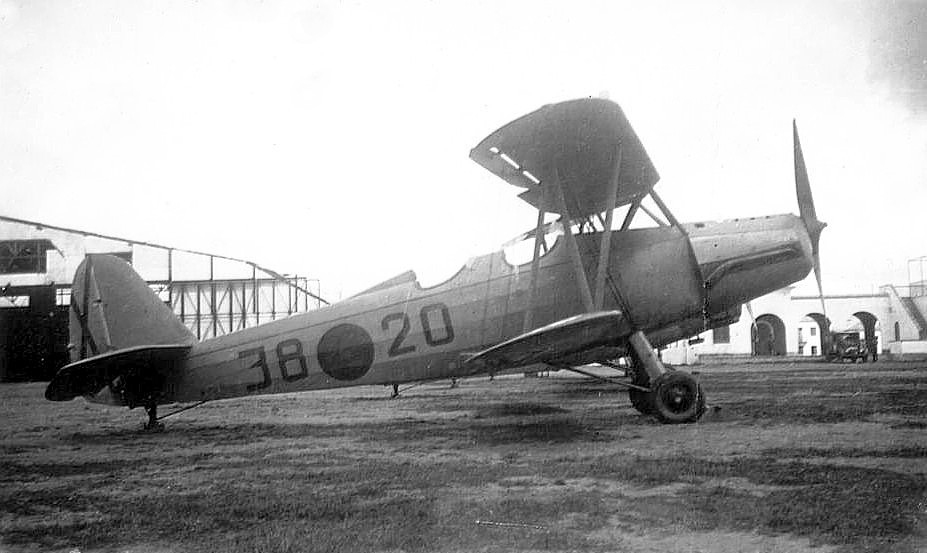
rebel aircraft (sample)

The morning of the day marked the climax of rebel might in the province. Though the rebels took control in only 16 locations of the province, these were the most important towns and cities. An aircraft from La Torrecica flew over Albacete and dropped leaflets which declared successful insurgency; small detachments were being sent from the provincial capital to other locations, though the one to Almansa, led by Molina, again got stuck in skirmishes near Pozo Cañada. However, as the government retained and stabilized power in the neighboring areas, it was increasingly clear that the province of Alicante remains an isolated bastion of insurgency, from all sides surrounded by the loyalist garrisons. The nearest provincial capital controlled by the rebels was Teruel, some 150 km away.

In the early afternoon loyalist units were already assembled in Alicante, Elda, Murcia and Valencia; supported by volunteers from workers’ militias, some of them were already loaded onto trains or trucks and headed towards the eastern comarcas of the Albacete province. In the evening the first troops reached Almansa. They were detached from the 10. Infantry Regiment in Valencia, a unit which itself remained ambiguous; also the detachment which arrived at Almansa, led by comandante Sintes Pellicer, behaved somewhat enigmatically. Vicente Sol managed to convince Sintes to stay loyal to the government, though Sintes refused to march on towards Albacete. Elsewhere the rebels prepared for combat; east of Hellín they blew up a railway bridge to stop an anticipated train with government troops approaching from Murcia. Another aircraft, this time from the loyalist air base, flew over Alicante and dropped leaflets calling for surrender.

=== Wednesday 22 July ===
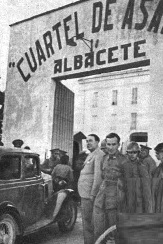
asaltos barracks, Albacete (later pic)

The Guardia Civil headquarters in Albacete was bombed by two loyalist aircraft, a raid which inflicted little damage but demonstrated that the government forces were in advance. There were no new developments in the provincial capital; despite the strike declared, it remained firmly under the rebel control.

Shortly before mid-day new troops from Alicante, commanded by comandante Enrique Gillis Mercer, reached Almansa and terminated a shaky and unclear situation in the city. No shot was fired; the rebels surrendered and were soon transported by train to Alicante.

Hellín was reached by first loyalist units arriving from Murcia. They included artillery detachments but their leading officer, comandante Verdonces, was actually inclined to join the rebels. As new governmental troops under commander Rufino Bañón Galindo reached Hellín he and the rebel commander Serena engaged in lengthy negotiations. Their outcome was very vague. Serena agreed to lead his Guardia Civil units out of the city towards Murcia and early at night departed Hellín in a convoy of buses, heading South-East. Situation was made even more chaotic as the column of Molina, back from an unsuccessful raid at Almansa, arrived near Hellín. Molina initially assumed the troops in Hellín adhered to the coup; having found the truth he diverted his men to Albacete.

=== Thursday 23 July ===
In the night hours the rebel Guardia Civil convoy from Hellín, commanded by Serena and agreed to report in loyalist headquarters in Murcia, changed direction. They reverted North and having detoured Hellín, via Elche de la Sierra they reached Albacete in the early hours of dusk.

In course of the day the loyalists consolidated their positions in eastern comarcas of the province, especially as new troops from Murcia and Cartagena, led by comandante José Balibrea Vera, were arriving at Hellín.

Since assuming control the Albacete rebels kept airing radio messages; initially they declared adhesion to the patriotic movement started in Morocco, later they highlighted their isolated position and asked for assistance. On 23 July, Franco, at the time in Tetuan, broadcast a vague pledge to provide help to Albacete. The same day he contacted Cabanellas and Queipo de Llano, requesting them to send aircraft with ammunition and air support, respectively from Zaragoza (300 km away) and Seville (400 km away). A contemporary historian claims that Franco was perfectly aware such assistance was out of the question, and that he was merely jockeying for future leadership position among the rebels commanders.

=== Friday 24 July ===
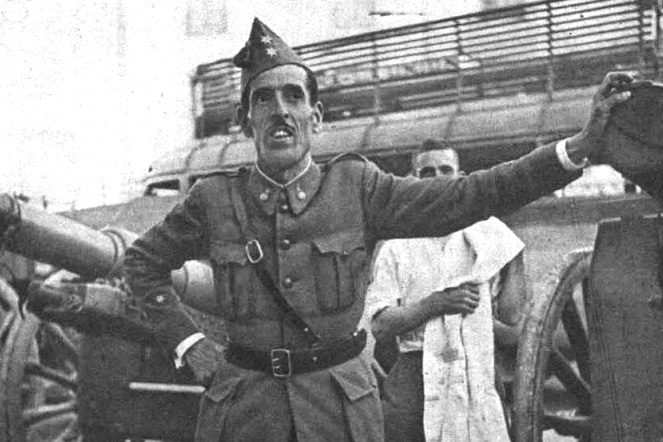
loyalist officer, Albacete, July 1936

Having consolidated their positions the government units resumed offensive towards the west. One column headed by Gillis proceeded from Almansa, another one headed by Balibrea proceeded from Hellín. Both columns converged near Chinchillas, where they were joined by the local military unit which stayed loyal to the government and for 4 days remained encircled. Two aircraft tried to bomb Guardia Civil positions in Albacete, but inaccurate pounding produced death of 4 civilians, including 2 women and 1 child. The rebel commanders were contemplating withdrawal, but as there were not enough vehicles available, Molina decided that no one would be left behind and all the rebels would accept the battle. He deployed his men at the Eastern outskirts of the city, bridges were blown up, railway tracks were torn and roadblocks were set.

In the course of the day the insurgents in the provincial capital were joined by reinforcements called from locations not seized by the loyalists yet, e.g. a large detachment of Guardia Civil arrived from Villarrobledo. Villarrobledo was left defended only by the local Falangists, yet in the afternoon of that day the militiamen arriving from the Ciudad Real province had already entered the city and urban combat ensued.

=== Saturday 25 July ===
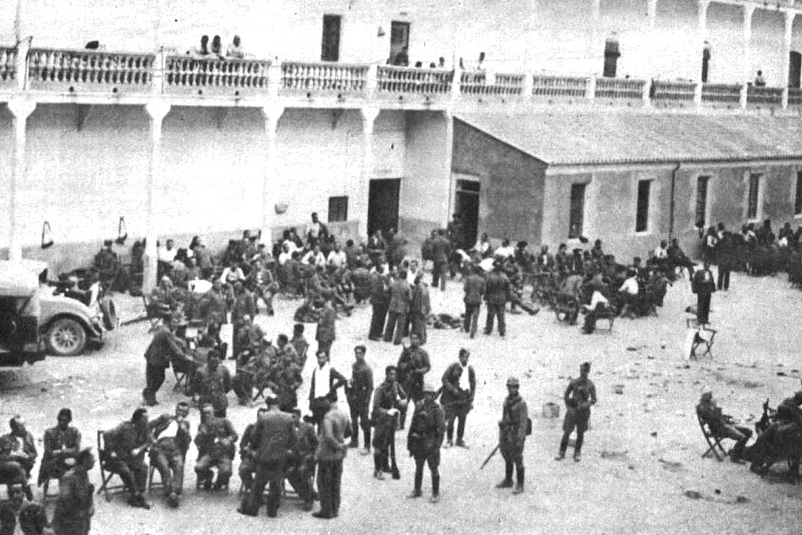
captured rebel civiles under guard in their headquarters, Albacete

Since early morning the loyalist aviation kept bombing Albacete; also the artillery laid fire on presumed rebel positions in the city. The insurgents hardly responded; their own artillery pieces failed, probably due to sabotage. The governmental troops, under a unified command of Balibrea, consisted of few hundred military and some 3,500 militiamen, which prepared for assault. Soon afterwards the loyalists entered the urban area, exchanging fire with the rebels. The latter started to withdraw towards the Guardia Civil barracks, and at 10 AM their radio message to Nationalist headquarters declared “desmoralización fuerzas extremada”. Shortly before mid-day Chápuli committed suicide shooting himself in the head. The last rebel radio message was sent at 12:40 PM and soon afterwards some 300 Guardias Civiles surrendered, while civilian volunteers tried to escape on their own. Martínez Morena was shot in unclear circumstances; according to some sources he was killed already as POW, on his way to prison.

Approximately at the same time also Villarrobledo was overrun by the Ciudad Real province militias; the rebel alcalde was killed while most of the Falangist defenders were dispersed. Upon return to their towns and villages, the militiamen were greeted to a heroes' welcome, though the episode also led to increasing violence against local derechistas.

=== Sunday 26 July ===
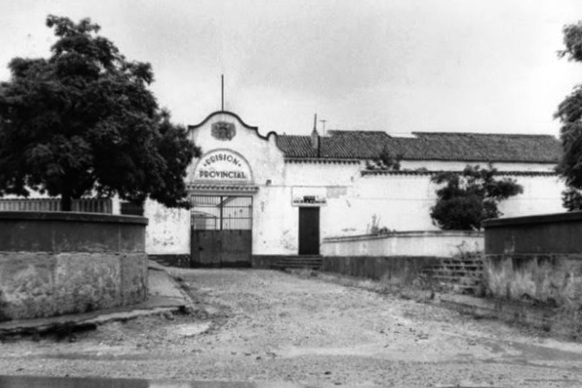
provincial prison, Albacete

The remaining small provincial pockets of rebellion were seized by the loyalists; they included Pozo Cañada, Alborea, Yeste, Balazote, La Gineta and Mahora. In some of these locations, e.g. in Alborea, the worker militias apprehended the rebels, in some others the insurgents managed to flee. By the end of 26 July, the province was entirely in governmental control. Also communication on the Madrid – Cartagena railway line was fully restored.

== Epilogue ==
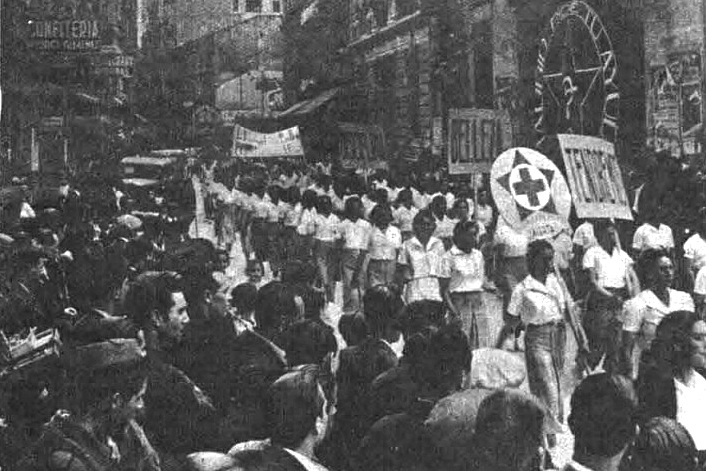
parade of females from Anti-Fascist Youth, Albacete, 1937

General Miaja arrived in Albacete from Madrid on 28 July. During his brief stay he tried to organize heterogeneous uniformed units in the province into a shock column capable of assaulting Córdoba. The victorious loyalists launched a repressive campaign against the actual and perceived rebels. It climaxed in prison sacas of 22 September 1936, where 56 inmates were killed. Some of the Guardia Civil insurgents taken prisoner were later incorporated into the Republican ranks and fought against the Nationalists. In mid-October 1936 the first International Brigades volunteers started to arrive in Albacete, which soon turned into the principal interbrigadista base.

Virgilio Martínez was reinstated as alcalde of Albacete and served until February 1937; he was arrested by the Nationalists, put on trial and executed in November 1939. Eleazar Huerta Valcárcel was reinstated as president of the provincial deputation and since February 1937 served as alcalde. He died on exile in Chile in 1974. Manuel Pomares was reinstated as civil governor but released in August 1936. He died on exile in Mexico in 1972. Vicente Sol served during the war as general director of prisons; on exile he formed part of the Albornoz government and died in Chile in 1953. José Balibrea served in the Army of Levante staff; he died in Spain in 1970. Rufin Bañon was sentenced by the Francoist court to 30 years in prison; he was released in 1946 and died in Hellín in 1992. Alfonso Cirujeda was detained in Madrid on 8 August 1936 and executed in November 1936 sacas. Following surrender Angel Molina was placed in the Cartagena prison ship and executed in mid-August 1936. Isaac Martínez was put on trial twice: in 1937 by Popular Tribunal and in 1940 by Francoist military court. Fulgencio Lozano during early Francoism was a provincial Falange jefe; he ran a pharmaceutical business in Albacete and was last noted in 1969.

Largest Republican territorial gains in km^{2}
	Battle	Date	Territory
1	suppression of the coup in Albacete	July 1936	12,000
2	advance in eastern Aragon	July-August 1936	10,000
3	advance in Cordoba province	July-August 1936	5,000
4	suppression of the coup in Guadalajara	July 1936	1,000
5	Battle of Peñarroya (Battle of Valsequillo)	January 1939	770
6	Invasion of Baleares	August 1936	720
7	Battle of Belchite	August 1937	550
8	Battle of Ebro	July 1938	500
9	Battle of Teruel	January 1938	250
10	Battle of Guadalajara	March 1937	200
10	Battle of Brunete	July 1937	200

The 1936 coup in Albacete stands out as a fairly unique development; in many respects it differs from the coup as unfolding elsewhere in most Spain. Unlike in most other provinces it was executed not by the military but by Guardia Civil, who turned the primary rebel force in the province. Unlike in most provinces where the insurgents failed they were defeated not by workers’ militias but by loyalist military units. Along Guadalajara, in July 1936 Albacete was the only provincial capital initially seized by the rebels where the government regained control; along Teruel it was one of 3 provincial capitals ever re-captured by the Republican government during the Civil War.

Last but not least, the loyalist counter-offensive in the Albacete province represented the largest single territorial Republican gain during the Civil War; with some 12,000 square km seized from the rebels, it by far exceeded gains obtained later in July and August 1936 in the Cordoba province (some 5,000 km^{2}), in July 1936 in the Guadalajara province (some 1,000 km^{2}), in January 1939 in Extremadura (some 800 km^{2}) and in August 1936 in the Baleares (some 700 km^{2}), let alone other smaller territorial gains, obtained during the battle of Belchite, battle of Ebro, battle of Teruel, battle of Guadalajara, battle of Brunete and battle of La Granja. Along Guadalajara and Teruel, Albacete was one 3 provincial capitals re-taken by the Republicans during the war.
