= Yeste, Albacete =

Yeste
- Municipality
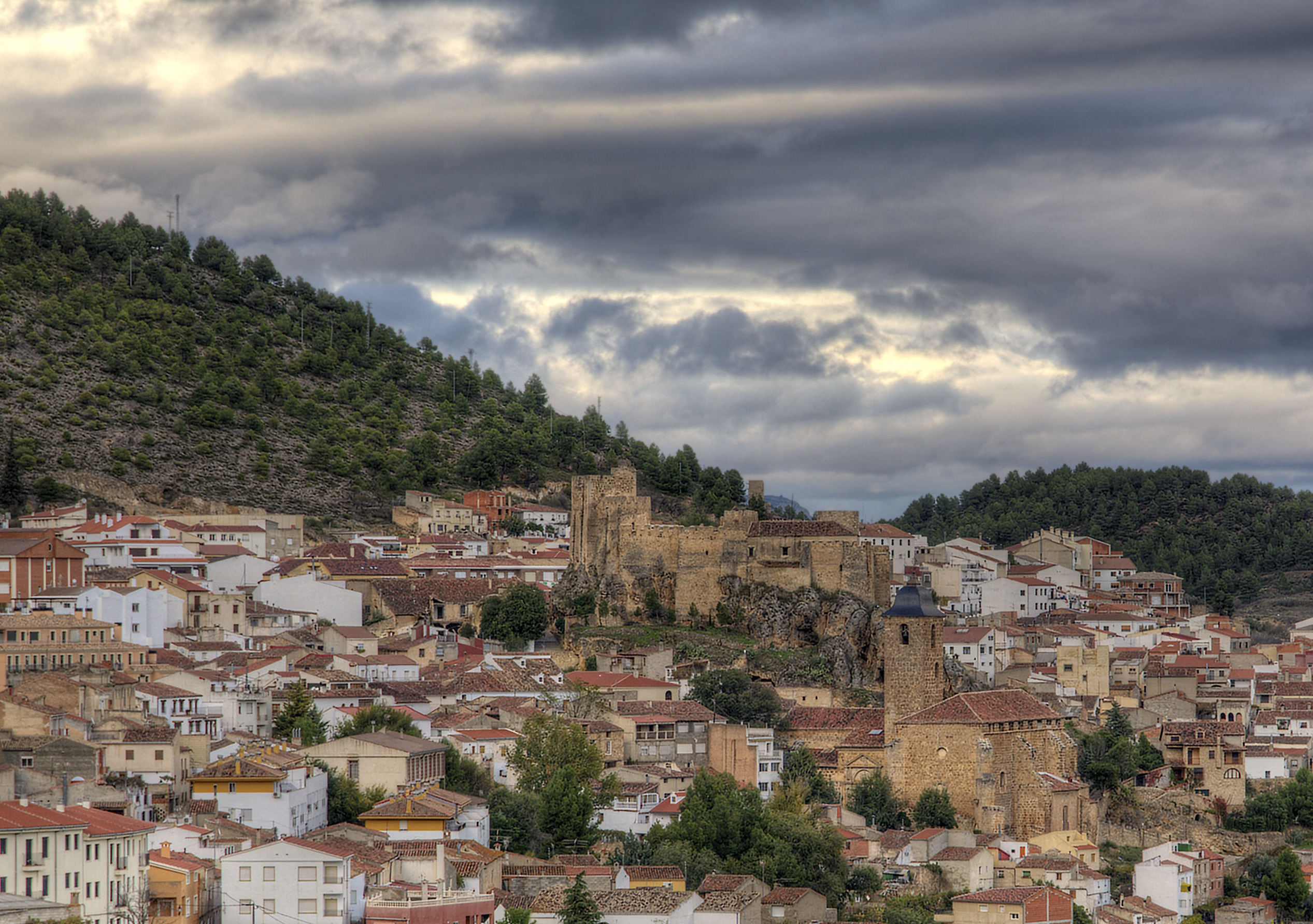

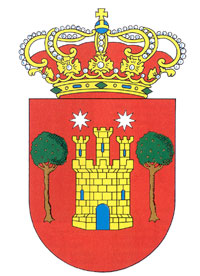
- Coat of arms

- Location of Yeste Yeste (Castilla-La Mancha)
- Coordinates: 38.365278°N 2.321389°W
- Country: Spain
- Community: Castilla-La Mancha
- Province: Albacete
- Comarca: Sierra del Segura

Government
  - Mayor: Estibaliz Garcia Nova

Area
  - Total: 511 km^{2} (197 sq mi)
- Elevation: 877 m (2,877 ft)
- Time zone: UTC+1 (CET)
  - Summer (DST): UTC+2 (CEST)
- Postal code: 02480

Yeste is a municipality in the province of Albacete, Castile-La Mancha, Spain, 138 km far from the capital, Albacete. In 2018 it had a population of 2,674.

It is known for the nearby La Vicaria Arch Bridge.

== Localities ==
- Moropeche

== See also ==
- Events of Yeste
