= Cave of Niño =

Cave and archaeological site in Spain

- Cueva del Niño (Spanish)
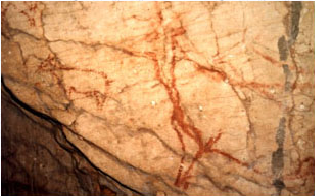

- Location within Spain
- 38.54286°N 2.15525°W
- Location: Aýna, Spain

Spanish Cultural Heritage
- Official name: Cueva del Niño
- Type: Non-movable
- Criteria: Monument
- Designated: 1997
- Reference no.: RI-51-0009648

The Cave of Niño (Spanish: Cueva del Niño) is a cave and archaeological site located in Aýna, Spain. It has a number of well preserved rock art drawings from the Paleolithic period. It was declared Bien de Interés Cultural in 1997.
