= Aýna, Spain =

Village in central Spain

Coordinates: 38°33′N 2°05′W

Aýna
- Municipality
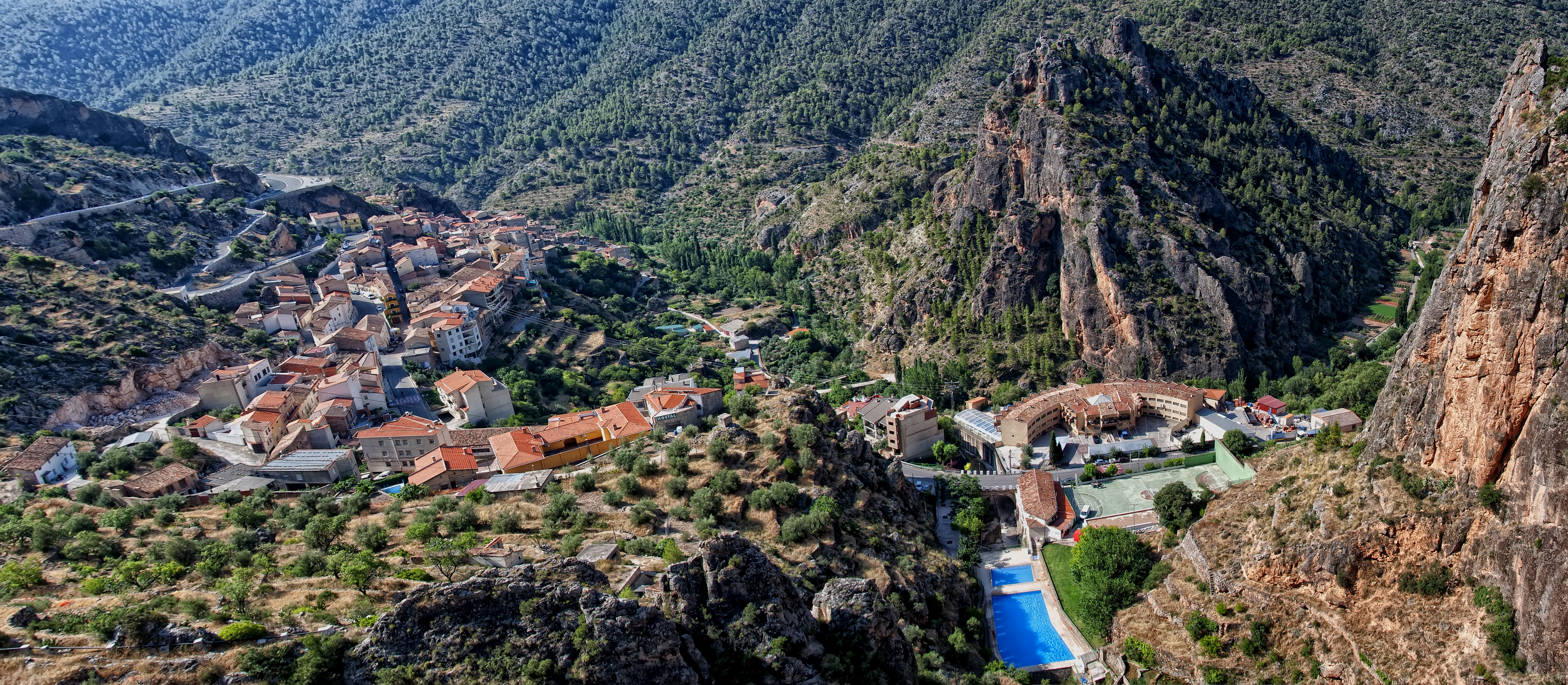
- Panoramic view of Aýna

- Coat of arms

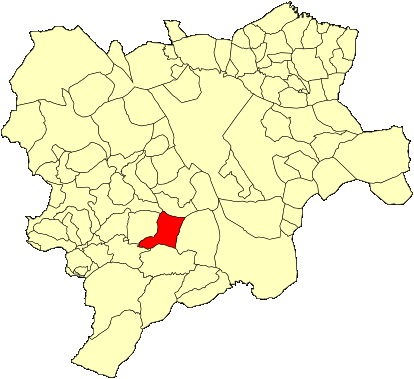
- location in Albacete
- Country: Spain
- Autonomous community: Castilla–La Mancha
- Province: Albacete
- Comarca: Sierra del Segura
- Judicial district: Hellín
- Demonym: Ayniegos
- Time zone: UTC+1 (CET)
  - Summer (DST): UTC+2 (CEST)
- Postal code: 02125
- Website: Official website

Aýna (Spanish pronunciation: [aˈina]) is a small village and municipality in the southern region of the province of Albacete, in the Spanish autonomous community of Castile-La Mancha. It is a popular summer vacation destination due to its pleasant scenery and climate. It has a population of over 900 inhabitants, which has declined between 1950 and 2000. Aýna is referred to as "Manchegan Switzerland" due to its location between two mountain ranges.

== Name ==
The name of Aýna is derived from the Arabic عَيْن (ʕayn) meaning 'spring' or 'source'. The spelling of the town preserves an archaic use of the letter ⟨y⟩ – in modern Spanish this letter is used almost exclusively before vowels and at the end of words, but Old Castilian frequently also used it after vowels, and even as a vowel itself.

Historically, the name of the town was spelt Ayna, without any accent marks. This changed in 2010 when the Royal Spanish Academy recommended that an acute accent be added to the letter ⟨y⟩, to indicate that the ⟨y⟩ not only makes a full vowel sound (rather than forming a diphthong with the preceding ⟨a⟩), but is in fact part of the stressed syllable. The spelling is notable for being one of very few examples of the use of the character ⟨ý⟩ in Spanish, otherwise only seen in old-fashioned spellings of personal names.

== Bibliography ==
- Ortografía de la lengua española [Orthography of the Spanish language] (in Spanish). Real Academia Española. 2010. p. 235. ISBN 9788467047868. OCLC 757621776.
