= Ángel Molina Galano =

Spanish army officer (1889–1936)

- Born: 1889; Málaga, Spain
- Died: 1936 (aged 46–47) Cartagena, Spain
- Branch: Spanish Republican Army, Guardia Civil
- Rank: Officer
- Known for: Leader of the Spanish coup of July 1936 in the Albacete province

Ángel Molina Galano (1889–1936) was a Spanish army and Guardia Civil officer. He is known mostly as the leader of the Spanish coup of July 1936 in the Albacete province.

== Family ==
Molina descended from a military family. His ancestors held various positions in the army since the 18th century. His father was Luis Molina Olivera (1847–1906), who ended his career as general de división and military governor of the Badajoz province. All of his 5 brothers also joined the army; 2 of them were in the Rif War in Morocco. One of his brothers sided with the Republicans during the civil war and died on exile in France. His son, Luis Molina Navarro, also joined Guardia Civil and in the 1970s served as comandante in Albacete.

== Career ==
Born in Málaga during military assignement of his father to Andalusia, in 1907 he joined the military academy in Toledo and graduated as segundo teniente in 1910. He was despatched to Melilla and served in Morocco during the following 3 years. In 1912 promoted to primer teniente, in 1913 he was posted back to the peninsula, to Alicante.

In 1914, Molina requested transfer to Guardia Civil, which was granted the same year. He served on minor command positions, mostly on the southern Levantine coast. In 1919 he was promoted to capitán. In 1920 he was posted to Comandancia de Albacete, to lead the garrison of Almansa, where he would serve during the following 8 years.

In 1929, Molina was transferred to Madrid, posted to the Guardia Civil garrison attached to Casa Real. He was involved in proceedings against signatories of so-called Pact of San Sebastián, and in late 1930 was personally thanked by the king, Alfonso XIII.

Following the fall of the monarchy in 1931, Molina was posted to Comandancia de Madrid. In 1933, he was promoted to comandante and left with no assignement as so-called "disponible forzoso", before in 1934, he was sent to Comandancia de Albacete as deputy commander of the city Guardia Civil garrison. At unspecified time prior to outbreak of the war, he assumed command of the Albacete civiles and was in command during the Events of Yeste.

In July 1936, Molina was among leaders of the military conspiracy in Albacete; he commanded the rebels, who seized control of the entire province. He led the insurgents during combat against loyalist troops and surrendered on July 25. Taken prisoner, he was initially placed in Prisión Militar de la Marina in Cartagena, later to be transferred to one of the prison ships, where in August he was killed by the Republican militia.

== Other ==
In 1942, he was posthumously promoted to teniente coronel. One of the central streets in Albacete was named "Calle comandante Molina"; in 2003 it was renamed to "Calle Mariana Pineda".
