= Moropeche =

Coordinates: 38°24′N 2°22′W

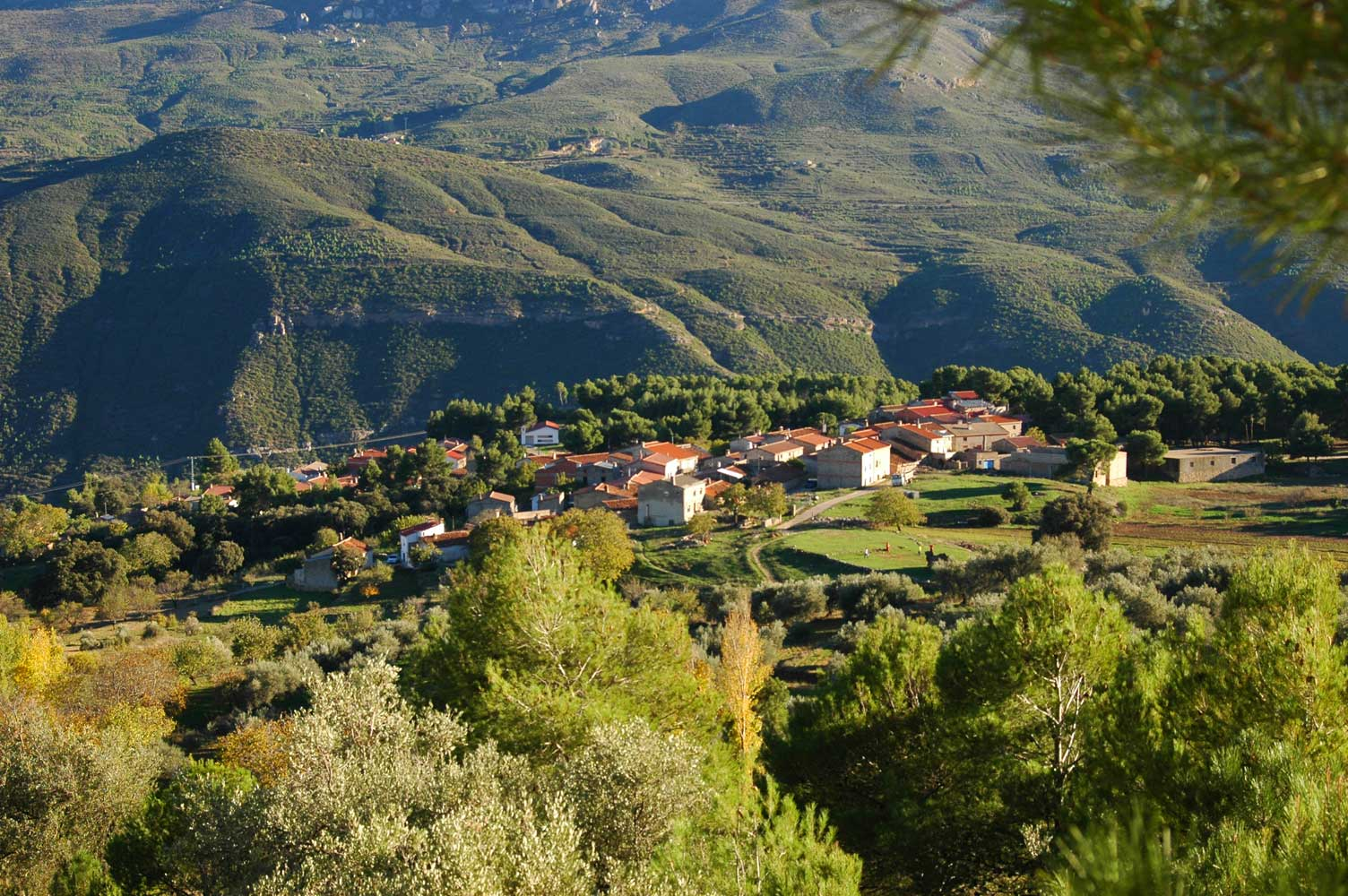
Moropeche

Moropeche is a village in the province of Albacete, Castile-La Mancha, Spain.
