= José Prat (politician) =

Spanish politician and jurist (1905–1994)

Representative of the Congress of Deputies

Representative of the Senate of Spain

Personal details
- Born: José Diosdado Prat García; 10 August 1905 Albacete, Spain
- Died: 17 May 1994 (aged 88) Madrid, Spain
- Party: Partido Socialista Obrero Español
- Education: Universidad de Granada
- Occupation: Politician, lawyer, jurist and professor

José Diosdado Prat García (10 August 1905 – 17 May 1994) was a Spanish politician and lawyer. He was a member of the Spanish Socialist Workers' Party. He was elected deputy from Albacete in 1933 and served as a senator from Madrid from 1 March 1979 to 17 November 1982. He also served as the 46th Solicitor General of Spain.

He died of an illness on 17 May 1994.

== Bibliography ==
- Ramos Ruiz, Ester (1994). Archivo de José Prat García (PDF). Fundación Francisco Largo Caballero. p. 319. Archived from the original (PDF) on 1 May 2018.
