= Mancomunidad de Municipios de la Sierra del Segura =

Mancomunidad de Municipios de la Sierra del Segura is a comarca of the Province of Albacete, Spain.
