= Manchego cuisine =

Cuisine of the Castilla–La Mancha region of Spain

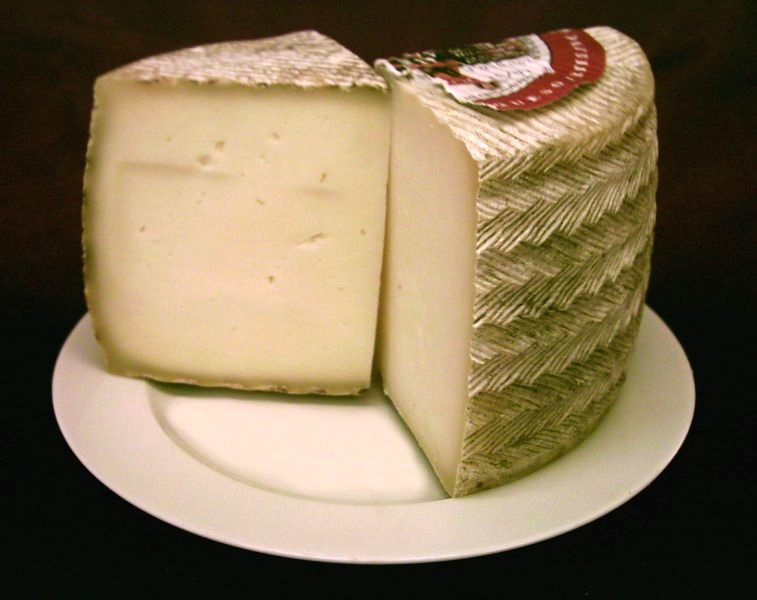
Manchego cheese, one of the better-known products of the region

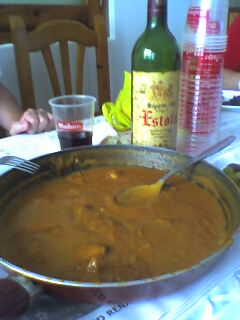
Gachas manchegas with a local wine in the background

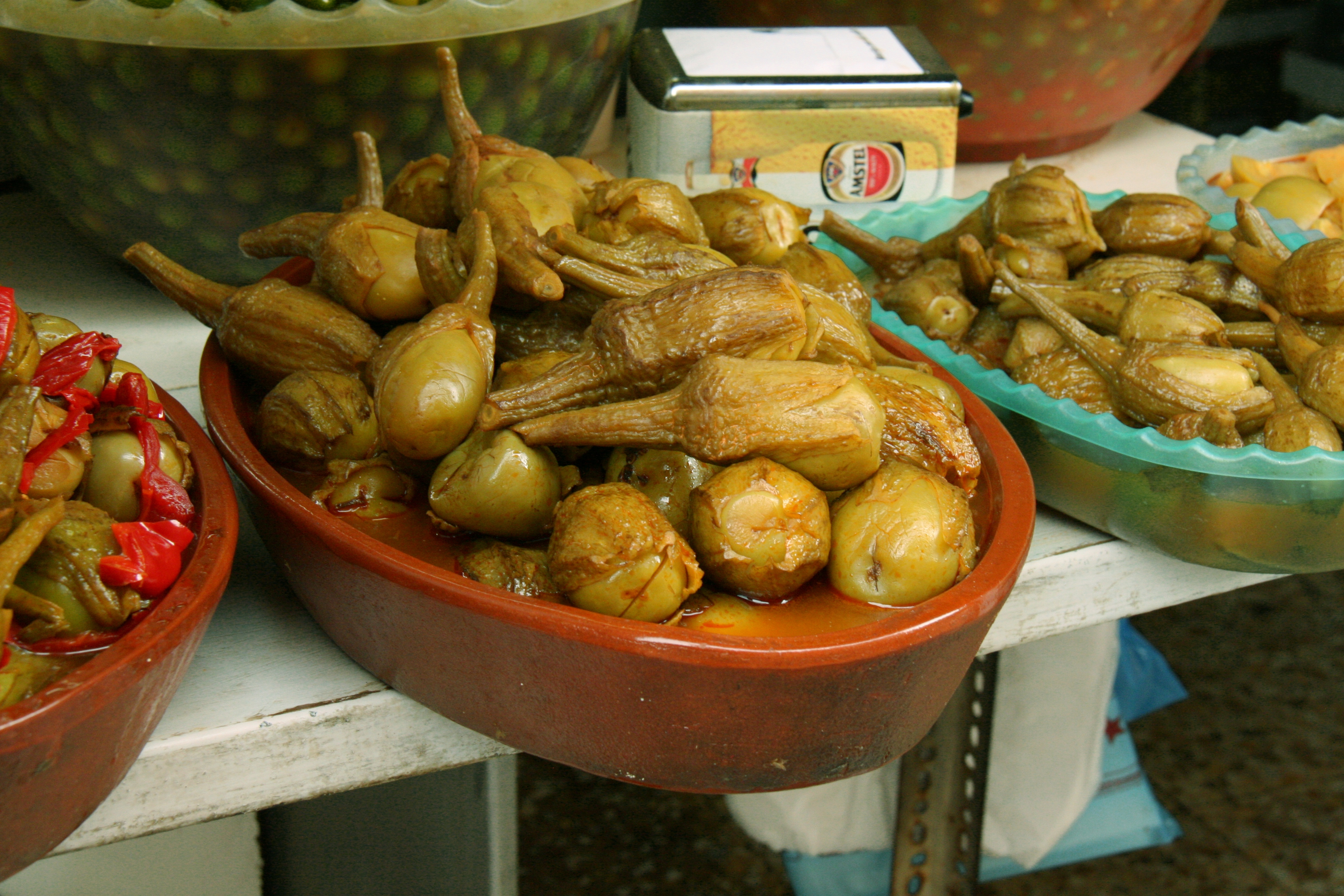
Berenjenas de Almagro

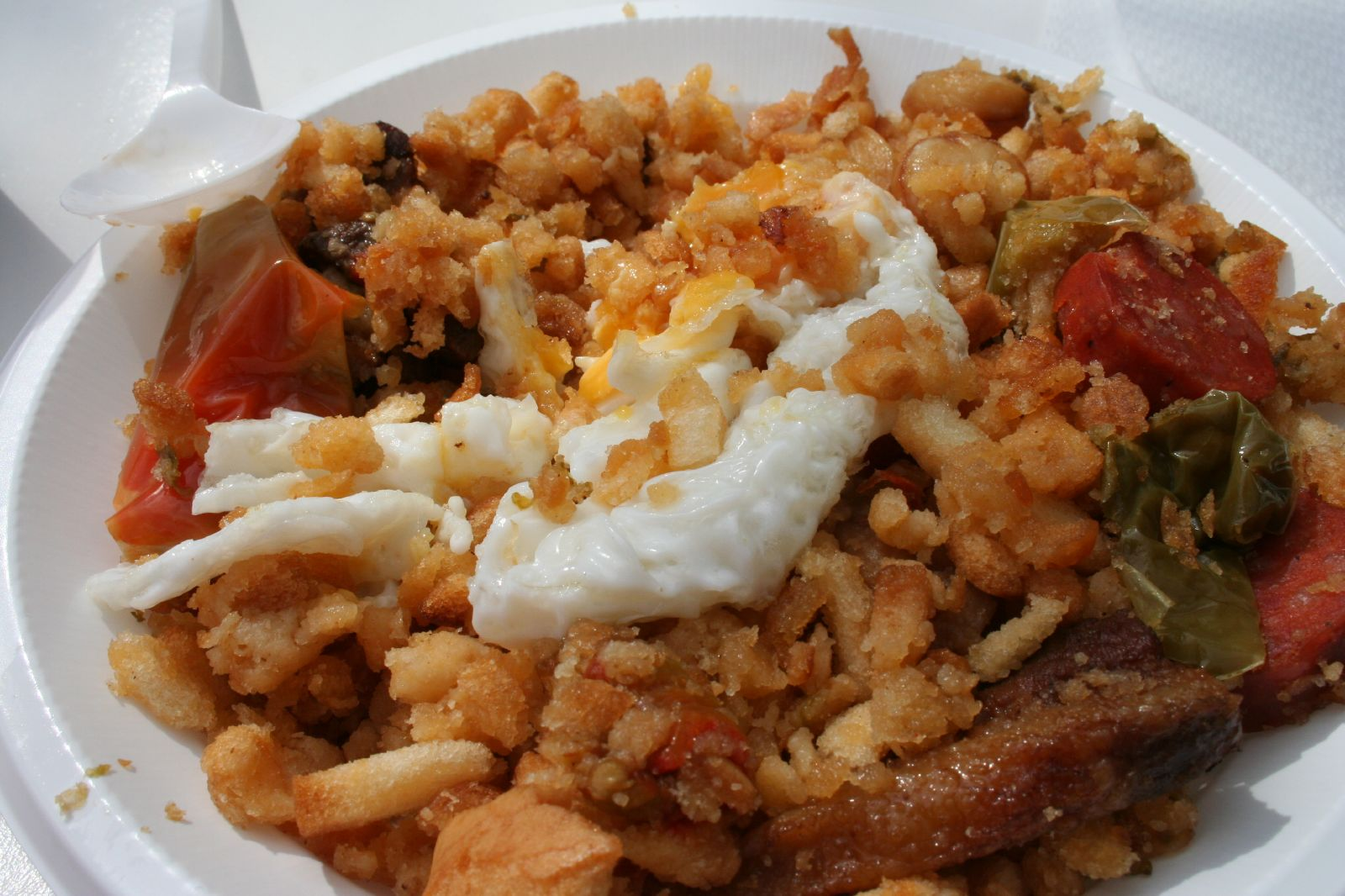
Migas with fried egg, peppers, and sausage

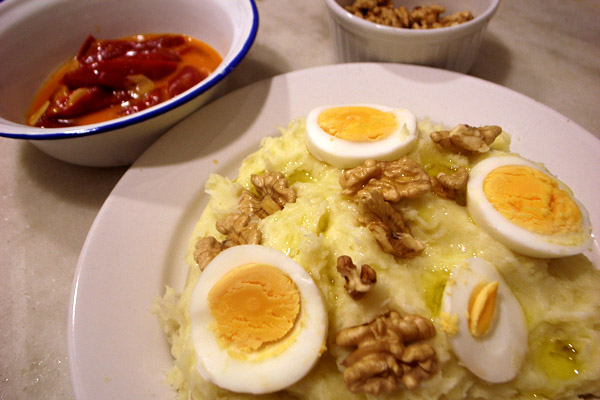
Atascaburras, a typical regional dish

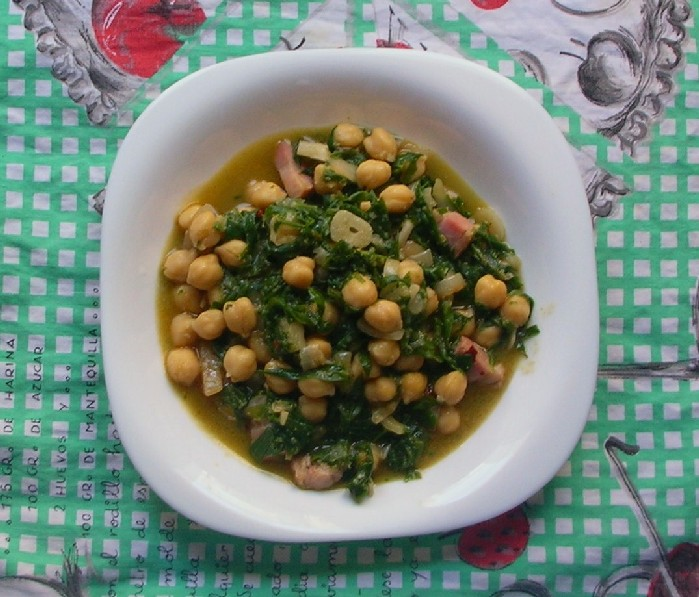
Chickpea and Silene vulgaris stew (potaje de garbanzos y collejas)

Manchego cuisine (Manchegan cuisine or Castilian-Manchego cuisine) refers to the typical dishes and ingredients in the cuisine of the Castilla–La Mancha region of Spain. These include pisto (a vegetable stew with tomato sauce), gazpacho manchego, Manchego cheese, the white wine of La Mancha, and the red wine from Valdepeñas (DO).

The dishes and specialties of the region are generally sober and sensible, reflecting a modest, rural origin. They contain a limited number of ingredients that tend to be those most easily accessible by the locals. Dishes tend to be high in calories, ideal for the diets of laborers, farmers, and shepherds. The cuisine of this area was popularized by Miguel de Cervantes in his early-17th-century novel Don Quixote, in which a number of traditional dishes are mentioned.

== Staples ==
In La Mancha, traditional dishes include gachas de almorta, a paste made with grass pea (Lathirus sativus) flour, and tortas de gazpacho, a flat bread that is the base for the "gazpachos", an elaborate dish appearing in El Quixote under the name of "galianos".

== Fruits and vegetables ==
=== Local ingredients ===
One of the local vegetables is the bladder campion (Silene vulgaris) plant, known colloquially as collejas. These plants are traditionally gathered in the mountains of La Mancha (as well as others parts of Europe, Africa, and Asia) and used for a variety of dishes.

Like most Spanish cuisine, many local dishes contain garlic, including tiznao (salt cod with spring onions) and atascaburras (salt cod with mashed potatoes, also called ajoarriero). Additionally, the ñora, a cultivated version of the Capsicum annuum pepper from Valencia, is often used in local dishes such as manitas de cerdo (pig's feet) and migas.

Standalone products include Berenjena de Almagro, a variety of small aubergines that are grown in Almagro, Ciudad Real. These are seasoned and pickled according to a traditional recipe and usually eaten as a snack or side dish.

=== Vegetarian dishes ===
There are not many purely vegetarian dishes in the region. Some traditional vegetable-based dishes are pisto manchego (a local equivalent of ratatouille), pipirrana (a salad of onion, tomato, and cucumber), asadillo de la Mancha (roasted red peppers), and gazpacho viudo (widower gazpacho, or gazpacho made with bladder campion leaves).

== Meat and fish ==
There are many local meat dishes, which consist primarily of sheep, goat, and, to a lesser degree, beef. The most important dishes are carcamusas (typical of Toledo), chanfarina, roast lamb, cuchifritos, migas, gallina en pepitoria (chicken a la pepitoria), salpicón, paturrillo, and zarajo. In areas where there is a lot of hunting, a number of game based dishes are also popular, such as conejo al ajillo (rabbit with garlic), liebre a la cazadora (hare hunter-style), and caldereta manchega.

La Mancha is a landlocked area with historically few bodies of freshwater to allow for the generalization of fish in its cuisine. The traditional fish is therefore bacalao (salt cod), which was historically imported from coastal areas and does not spoil. This can be found in some dishes, notably chickpeas with cod, eaten during Lent.

== Cheeses ==
Queso manchego, or "cheese from La Mancha", is one of the most famous Spanish cheeses; more than 30% of Spain's cheese products are of this variety. It is a cured cheese made from the milk of local manchega sheep (Ovis aries ligeriensis), also called ovejas manchegas) which abound in the pastures year-round.

The mass of the cheese is fairly hard and dense, with an ivory-white color. It has a characteristically tart taste when it is new due to the natural flavor of the sheep's milk, though as the cheese ages it slowly develops a savory quality, which Carlos Yescas of the Oldways Cheese Coalition describes as "a delicate balance of buttery, tart, sweet, and nutty." The cheese is also high in calcium, Vitamins A, D, and E, and natural protein.

There are several varieties of queso manchego, differentiated by both curing time and individual tradition (some are submerged in olive oil while curing).

== Wines ==
Wine production is very important to the region, which has many protected designations of origin for the area. The major PDO is D.O. La Mancha, but others include: D.O. Valdepeñas in Ciudad Real; D.O. Méntrida in Toledo; D.O. Jumilla and D.O. Manchuela in Albacete; D.O. Mondéjar in Guadalajara, etc. In addition there are numerous home-made wines, such as the sacramental wines known as "pitarras."

== Entrées ==
- Arroz con liebre
- Atascaburras
- Caldereta manchega
- Cuchifritos
- Duelos y quebrantos
- Gachas
- Migas
- Lomo a la orca (also typical of Granada, Jaén, and Valencia)
- Patatas al ajo cabañil
- Perdiz escabechada
- Pipirrana
- Pisto
- Sopa de ajo
- Zarajo

== Desserts ==
- Almendrados
- Alajú
- Amarguillos
- Arrope
- Arroz con leche (rice pudding)
- Bienmesabe
- Buñuelos
- Copa imperial
- Dormido del corpus
- Hojuelas
- Leche frita
- Mantecados
- Mazapán / Mazapán de Toledo
- Miguelitos, of La Roda, speciality
- Pestiños
