= List of Spanish sheep breeds =

This is a list of the sheep breeds usually considered to have originated in Spain. Some may have complex or obscure histories, so inclusion here does not necessarily imply that a breed is predominantly or exclusively Spanish.

Local name(s)	English name, if any	Notes	Image
Alcarreña^{[1]}^{[2]}^{[3]}^{[4]}			
Ansotana^{[1]}^{[2]}^{[3]}^{[4]}			
Aranesa^{[1]}^{[2]}^{[3]}^{[4]}			
Canaria^{[1]}^{[2]}^{[3]}			
Canaria de Pelo^{[1]}^{[2]}^{[3]}^{[4]}			
Carranzana^{[1]}^{[2]}^{[3]}^{[4]}			
Carranzana Cara Rubia^{[4]}			
Carranzana (variedad Negra)^{[1]}^{[2]}^{[3]}^{[4]}			
Cartera^{[1]}^{[2]}^{[3]}^{[4]}			
Castellana^{[1]}^{[2]}^{[3]}			
Castellana (variedad Negra)^{[1]}^{[3]}^{[4]}			
Chamarita^{[1]}^{[2]}^{[3]}^{[4]}			
Churra^{[1]}^{[2]}^{[3]}			
Churra Lebrijana^{[1]}^{[2]}^{[3]}^{[4]}			
Churra Tensina^{[1]}^{[2]}^{[3]}^{[4]}			
Colmenareña^{[1]}^{[2]}^{[3]}^{[4]}			
Guadelupe^{[4]}		extinct	
Guirra^{[1]}^{[2]}^{[3]}^{[4]}			
Infantado^{[4]}		extinct	
Latxa^{[1]}^{[2]}^{[3]}			
Lojeña^{[1]}^{[2]}^{[3]}			
Maellana^{[1]}^{[2]}^{[3]}^{[4]}			
Manchega^{[1]}^{[2]}^{[3]}			
Manchega (variedad Negra)^{[1]}^{[2]}^{[3]}^{[4]}			
Merina^{[1]}^{[2]}^{[3]}^{[4]}	Merino		
Merina (variedad Negra)^{[1]}^{[2]}^{[3]}^{[4]}			
Merina (variedad de los Montes Universales)^{[1]}^{[3]}			
Merina de Grazalema^{[1]}^{[2]}^{[3]}^{[4]}			
Merino Precoz^{[1]}^{[3]}			
Montesina^{[1]}^{[2]}^{[3]}^{[4]}			
Navarra^{[1]}^{[2]}^{[3]}^{[4]}			
Negretti^{[4]}		extinct	
Ojalada^{[1]}^{[2]}^{[3]}^{[4]}			
Ojinegra de Teruel^{[1]}^{[2]}^{[3]}^{[4]}			
Ovella Eivissenca^{[1]}^{[3]}; Ibicenca^{[2]}^{[4]}			
Ovella Galega^{[1]}^{[3]}; Gallega^{[2]}^{[4]}			
Ovella Mallorquina^{[1]}^{[3]}; Mallorquina^{[2]}^{[4]}			
Ovella Menorquina^{[1]}^{[3]}; Menorquina^{[2]}^{[4]}			
Ovella Roja Mallorquina^{[1]}^{[3]}; Roja Mallorquina^{[2]}^{[4]}			
Palmera^{[1]}^{[2]}^{[3]}			
Paular^{[4]}		extinct	
Perales^{[4]}		extinct	
Rasa Aragonesa^{[1]}^{[2]}^{[3]}^{[4]}			
Ripollesa^{[1]}^{[2]}^{[3]}^{[4]}			
Roncalesa^{[2]}			
Roya Bilbilitana^{[1]}^{[3]}^{[4]}			
Rubia del Molar^{[1]}^{[3]}^{[4]}			
Salz^{[1]}^{[3]}			
Sasi Ardi^{[1]}^{[2]}^{[3]}^{[4]}			
Segureña^{[1]}^{[2]}^{[3]}^{[4]}			
Talaverana^{[1]}^{[2]}^{[3]}^{[4]}			
Tudelana^{[1]}^{[3]}^{[4]}			
Xalda^{[1]}^{[2]}^{[3]}^{[4]}			
Xisqueta^{[1]}^{[2]}^{[3]}^{[4]}			
