= Mahora, Spain =

Mahora
- Municipality
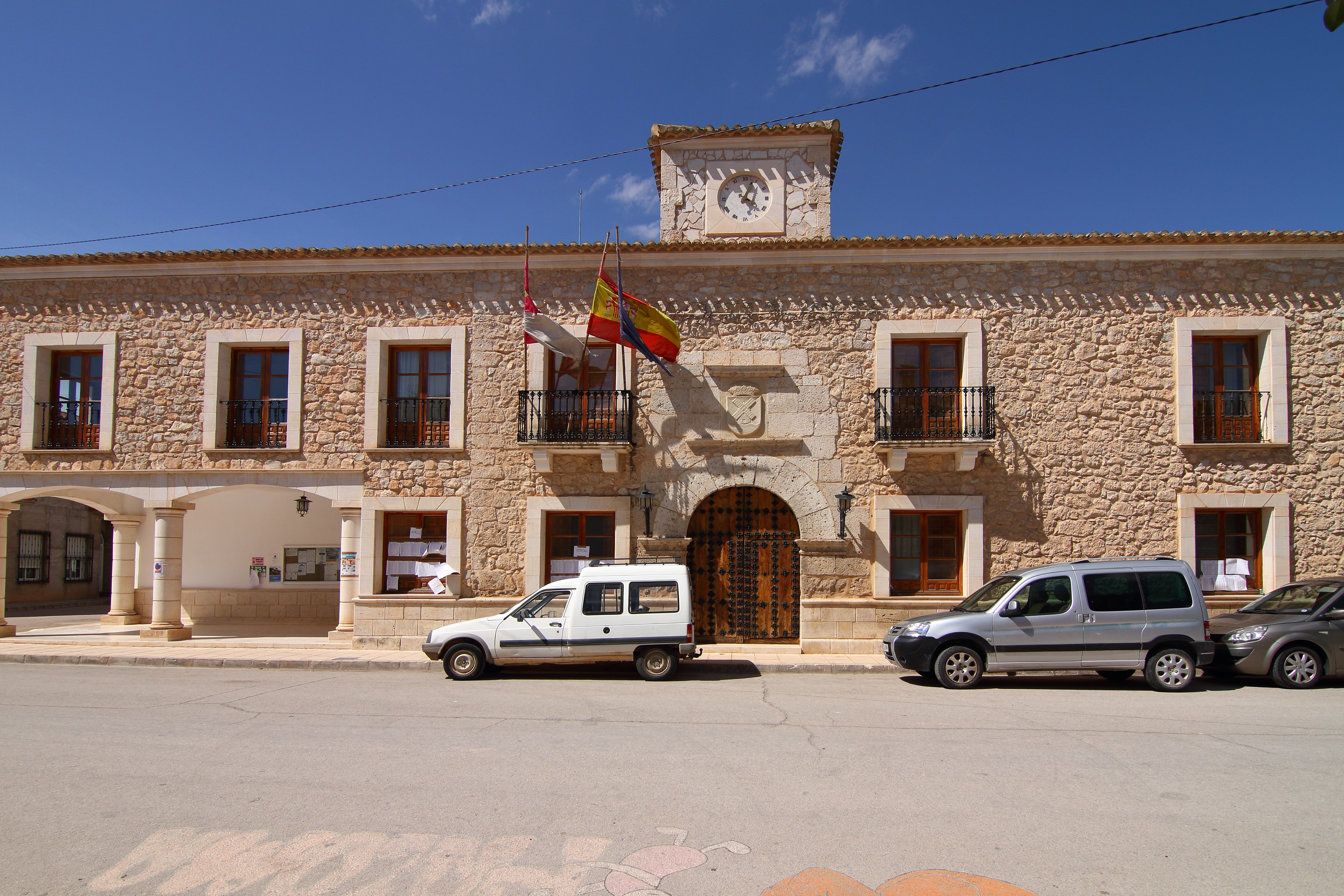
- Town hall

- Coat of arms

- Location within Spain
- Coordinates: 39°12′46″N 1°43′31″W
- Country: Spain
- Autonomous Community: Castile-La Mancha
- Province: Albacete
- Judicial District: Casas-Ibáñez

Area
  - Total: 108.14 km^{2} (41.75 sq mi)
- Elevation: 663 m (2,175 ft)

Population (2024)
  - Total: 1,465
  - Density: 13.55/km^{2} (35.09/sq mi)
- Postal code: 02240
- Area code: 967
- Website: www.mahora.es

Mahora is a municipality in the southeast of the Iberian Peninsula, located in the Province of Albacete, part of the autonomous community of Castile-La Mancha. It is situated 29 km from the provincial capital.

== Geography ==
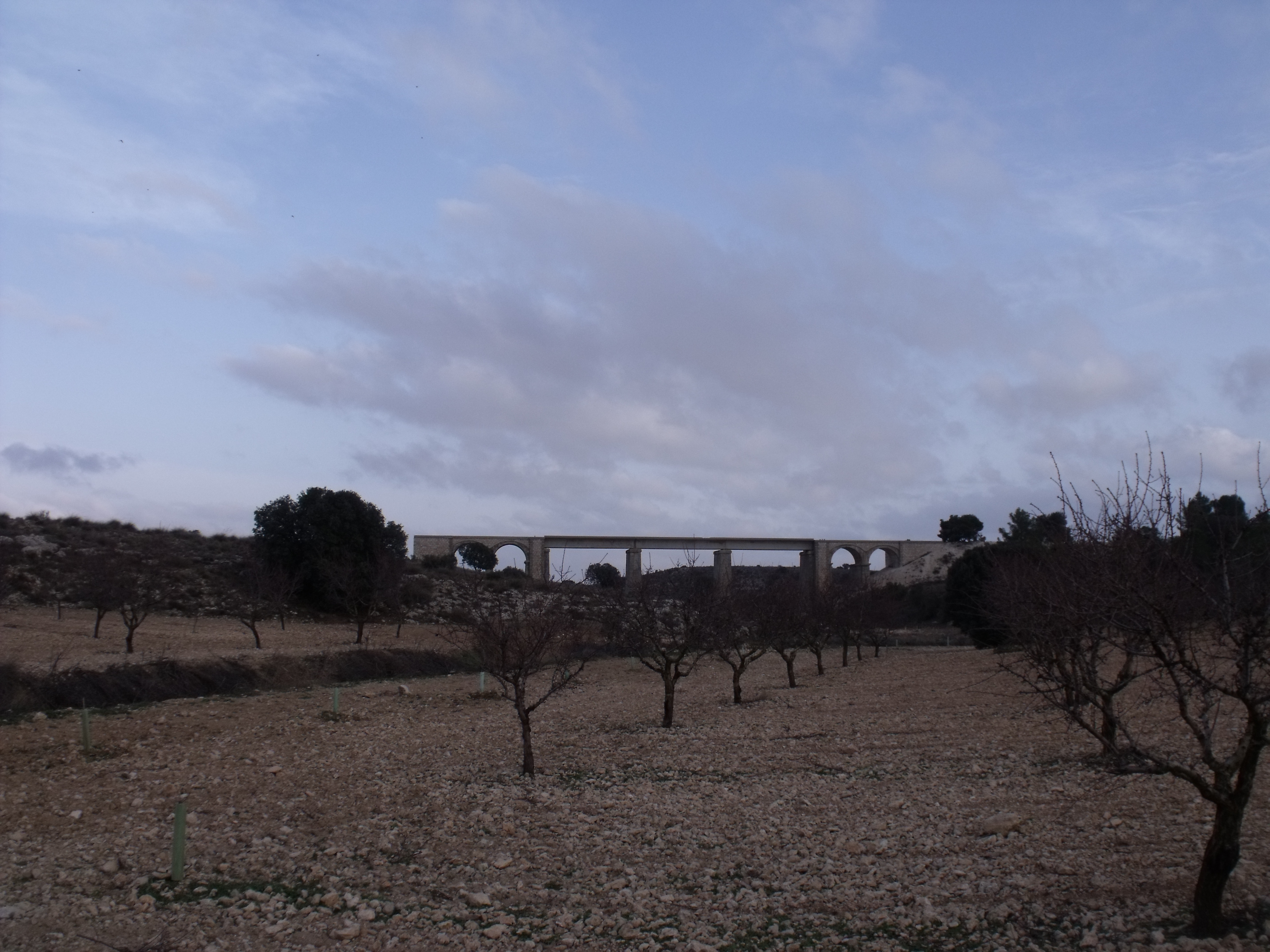
Valdemembra river plain, with the unfinished railway bridge in the background.

Integrated into the La Manchuela region, it is located 29 kilometers from Albacete.

The municipal relief is predominantly flat, although slightly undulating, with an average altitude of 679 meters. The highest point is Cerro de las Cabezas (712 meters) and the lowest is Casa Tía Juliana (654 meters). The terrain is clayey and stony. The hydrographic network is marked by the Valdemembra river in its final stretch and the Júcar River, which forms the southern border of the municipality, bordering Valdeganga. The climate is Mediterranean with strong continental influence, characterized by harsh winters and hot summers.

== History ==
=== Prehistory and Antiquity ===
The toponym Mahora is possibly of Arabic origin ("the tavern"). The origins of settlement date back to the Iberian era, with archaeological sites in Cabezo de los Silos and Villares de Tochoso. The Romanization of the area was consolidated from the I century BC. In 1945, an incineration burial was discovered in the urban center (Calle San Roque) with grave goods consisting of objects of Roman glass and an Iberian urn covered by a terra sigillata plate dated between the I and II centuries AD.

=== Middle Ages and Lordship of Villena ===
Following the Muslim invasion, the territory belonged to the Taifa Kingdom of Toledo. The Christian Reconquista began around 1211-1212. In 1243, Alfonso X the Wise incorporated the lands into the Lordship of Villena, becoming dependent on the town of Jorquera. Over the following centuries, Mahora remained under the administration of the Marquisate of Villena, a feudal territory until the XIX century.

=== Modern Age and Municipal Charter (Villazgo) ===
Mahora experienced a notable boom when it became a residence for numerous noble families, leading to the construction of various palatial homes and mansions. Due to this concentration of nobility, Mahora was known as «La Corte Chica» ("The Little Court"). Mahora obtained the privilege of villazgo (municipal charter) on August 31, 1663, finally separating from Jorquera, although its manorial ties were maintained.

=== Spanish Civil War and International Brigades Hospital ===
During the Spanish Civil War, Mahora played a significant role in the Republican rear guard. On August 10, 1936, the Parish Church was looted and destroyed, with the loss of altarpieces and historical images in a public bonfire. On May 26, 1937, the «Center for Professional Rehabilitation and Reeducation» of the International Brigades was inaugurated in the town. This hospital, with capacity for 300 to 400 patients, was installed in the Casona del Marqués (requisitioned property). The center provided medical treatment and vocational training workshops for the reintegration of war wounded. It was closed in April 1938.

== Demographics ==
The municipality reached its maximum population in 1939 with 2,772 inhabitants. It subsequently suffered a notable rural exodus to Valencia and Catalonia.

== Economy ==
The local economy is traditionally based on agriculture. The predominant crops are cereals and grapevines (with about 2,500 hectares of vineyards), integrated into the D.O. Manchuela. Wine production is mainly channeled through the San Isidro Agricultural Cooperative. Irrigation has allowed for crop diversification, introducing Maize, sugar beet, and Alfalfa. Saffron cultivation remains a traditional, albeit declining, crop. The secondary and tertiary sectors are small, highlighting agro-food industries (cheesemaking), workshops, and the growing service and hospitality sector.

== Heritage ==
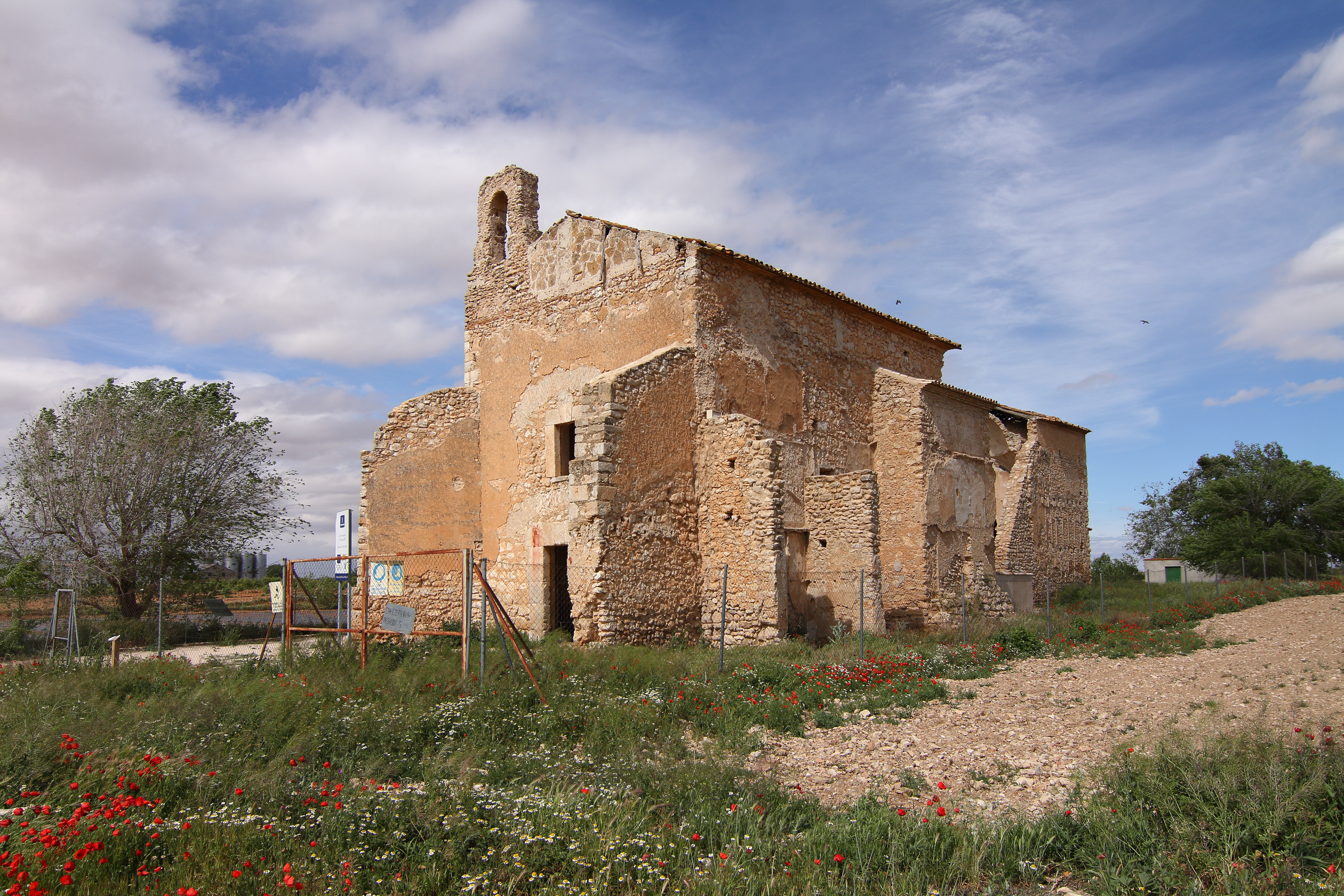
- Ruins of the former Franciscan convent.
- Church of Nuestra Señora de la Asunción: Declared an Asset of Cultural Interest (RI-51-0007366). It is a Gothic temple transitioning to Renaissance (XVI century), with a single nave and a tower dating from 1646.
- Convent of Nuestra Señora de Gracia: Founded in 1611 by the Discalced Franciscans on the site of an older hermitage. It served as a hospital and study center. It is currently a consolidated ruin.
- Civil Architecture: The town preserves numerous blazoned mansions and noble palaces from the XVI to the XVIII centuries, explaining the local nickname «La Corte Chica» ("The Little Court").
- Popular Architecture: The municipal area features numerous «cucos» or «chozos», circular dry-stone constructions traditionally used as agricultural shelters.

== Culture and festivals ==
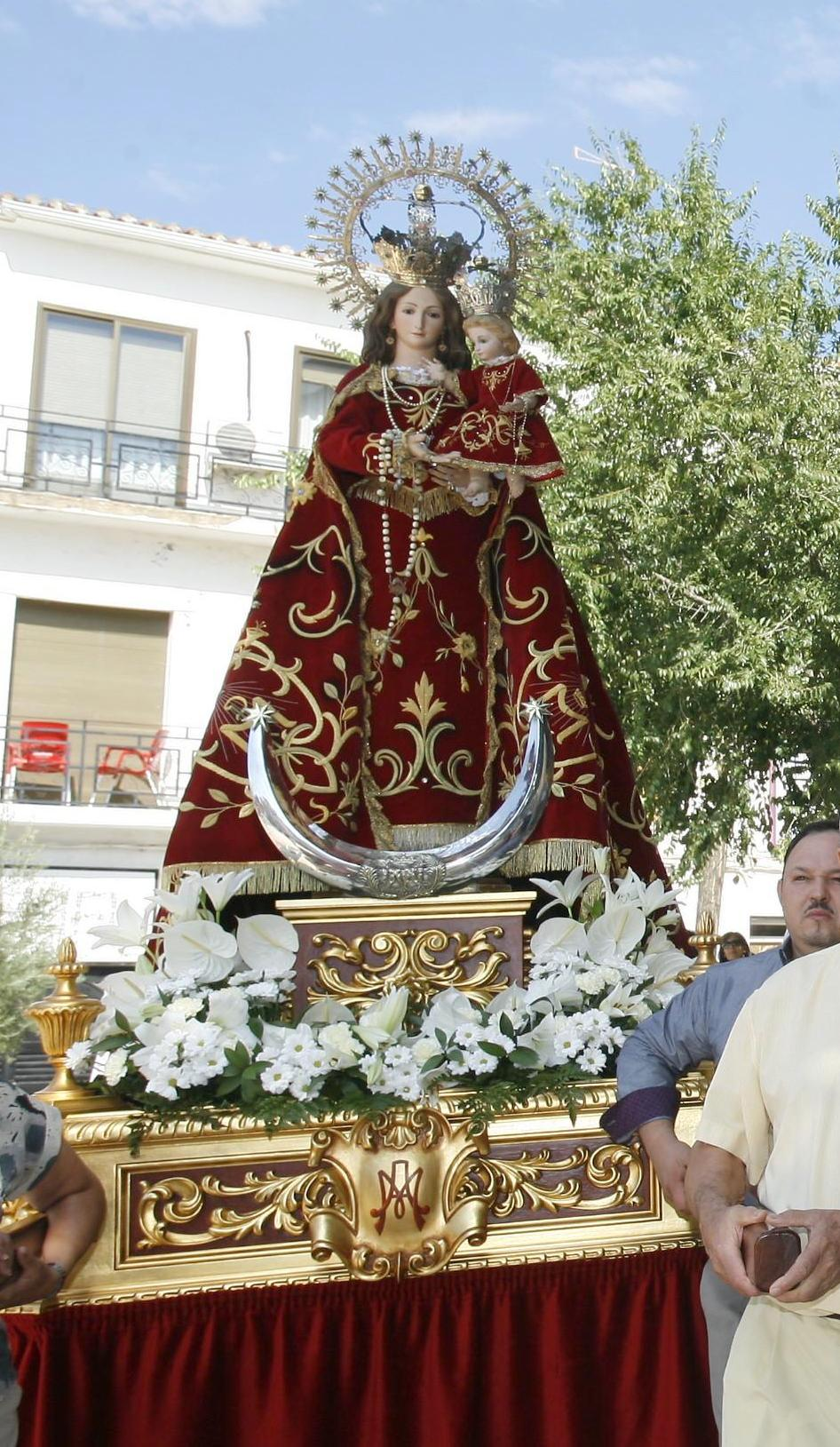
Virgen de Gracia (Our Lady of Grace).

The patron saint festivals are held in honor of San Roque and the Virgen de Gracia, from August 13 to 17. August 16 is the day dedicated to the patron saint.

Other notable festivities are:

- San Antón (January 17): Traditional blessing of animals, pilgrimage, and the «subasta» (auction). Typical products of the matanza (slaughter) are tasted.
- Jueves Lardero: Celebrated on the Thursday before Ash Wednesday with a communal meal in the countryside, where the «hornazo» (a cake with hard-boiled eggs and chorizo) is traditional.
- Holy Week: Highlights include the Procession of the Encounter and the tradition of the "albicias" (bouquets of flowers) offered by the quintos (young men of the town) to the Virgin on Easter Sunday.
- Los Mayos (April 30): Traditional singing of Mayos to the Virgin.
- San Isidro (May 15): Pilgrimage, communal meal in the countryside, and agricultural skill contests.

== Gastronomy ==
Mahora's gastronomy is the traditional Manchegan cuisine. Main dishes include Atascaburras, Gazpacho manchego, Gachas manchegas, Migas, and Ajo de mataero. Traditional desserts include buñuelos, fried rolls, and nuégados.

== See also ==
- International Brigades
