= Mahora =

Mahora may refer to:

- Mahora, Spain, in Albacete
- Mahora, New Zealand, in Hawke's Bay
- Mahora Secondary School, a fictional school in anime Negima! Magister Negi Magi
- Mahora, a mountain of Gorgany in the Carpathians
