= Gazpacho (disambiguation) =

Gazpacho is a cold soup from Andalusia, Spain.

Gazpacho may also refer to:

== Food ==
- Torta de gazpacho, a type of flat bread used to prepare a gazpacho-style dish
- Gazpacho (mixture), a cold Puerto Rican avocado, onion and fish-based mixture

== Music and TV ==
- Gazpacho (band), a progressive rock band from Norway
- Gazpacho (song), a song by Marillion from their 1995 album Afraid of Sunlight
- Gazpacho, the name of a character in the TV cartoon show Chowder
- Gazpacho, a character in the Spanish TV show Los Fruitis

== Other ==
- Gazpacho (software), a GUI builder for the GTK+ toolkit written in Python
