= Segureña =

Cordero Segureño
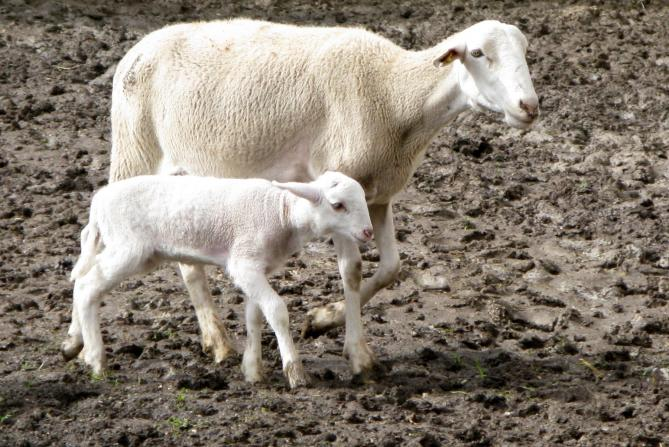
- Two cordero segureños
- Country of origin: Spain
- Distribution: Primarily in Granada, Almería, Jaén, Albacete and Murcia
- Use: Meat

Traits
- Weight: 50-75 kg
- Wool color: White
- Horn status: No horns

The cordero segureño is a Spanish breed of sheep adapted to life in the Sierra de Segura and La Sagra, as well as the highlands along the Segura River, from which it takes its name.

== Description ==
It originates from the Manchega lineage of the species but was officially separated from it by the Ministry of Agriculture, Fisheries, and Food in 1978, adopting the name segureña. This designation encompasses the white, rubisca, and mora varieties.

The harsh conditions endured by the breed, combined with its prolific nature and the high quality of its meat, contributed to the Spanish government's decision to grant it a Protected Geographical Indication (PGI) recognising its origin and quality on 23 April 2008. With its publication in the Official State Gazette (Boletín Oficial del Estado), the Spanish government allowed this PGI to begin operating, with a final approval from the European Union being granted on 26 December 2013.

The PGI "Cordero Segureño" applies only to lambs of the segureña breed raised in 144 municipalities across the provinces of Granada, Murcia, Albacete, Jaén, and Almería. In 2023 there was a total 149,731 lambs from 214 livestock farmers with almost 90% concentrated in Granada, Jaén and Almería alone.
