= Česnečka =

Soup

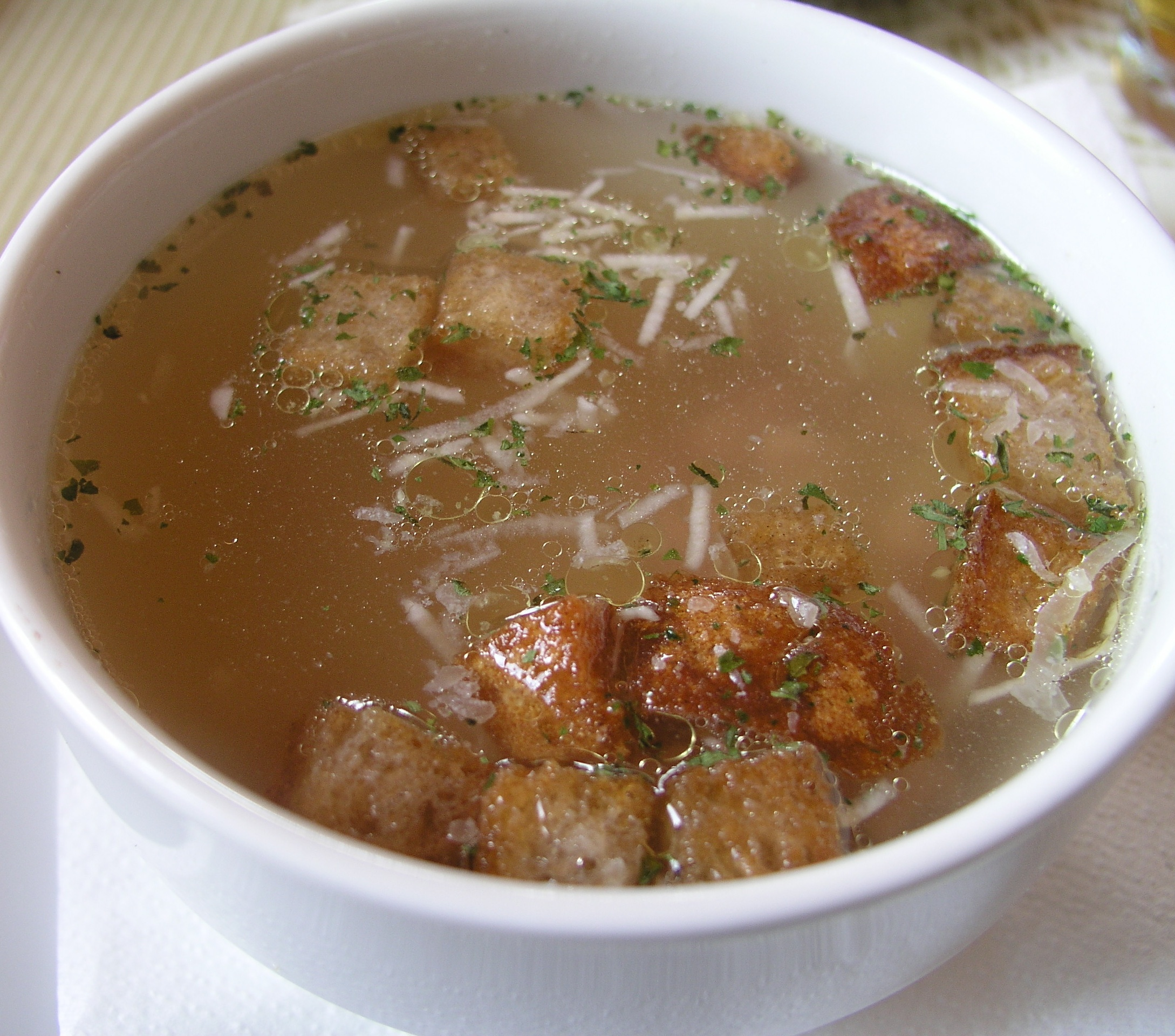
Česnečka at a restaurant in Hrádek nad Nisou, Czech Republic

Česnečka is a garlic soup in Czech cuisine and Slovak cuisine consisting of a thin broth, garlic, sliced potatoes and spices such as caraway, marjoram and cumin. A significant amount of garlic is typically used, and it is typically served with fried bread cubes. Additional ingredients sometimes used include lard or butter and grated cheese. It is usually prepared without any meat.

== History ==
Česnečka was sometimes consumed by poor farmhands in the Czech Republic in the 1910s.

== See also ==
- List of garlic dishes
- List of soups
