= Garlic soup =

Type of soup using garlic as a main ingredient

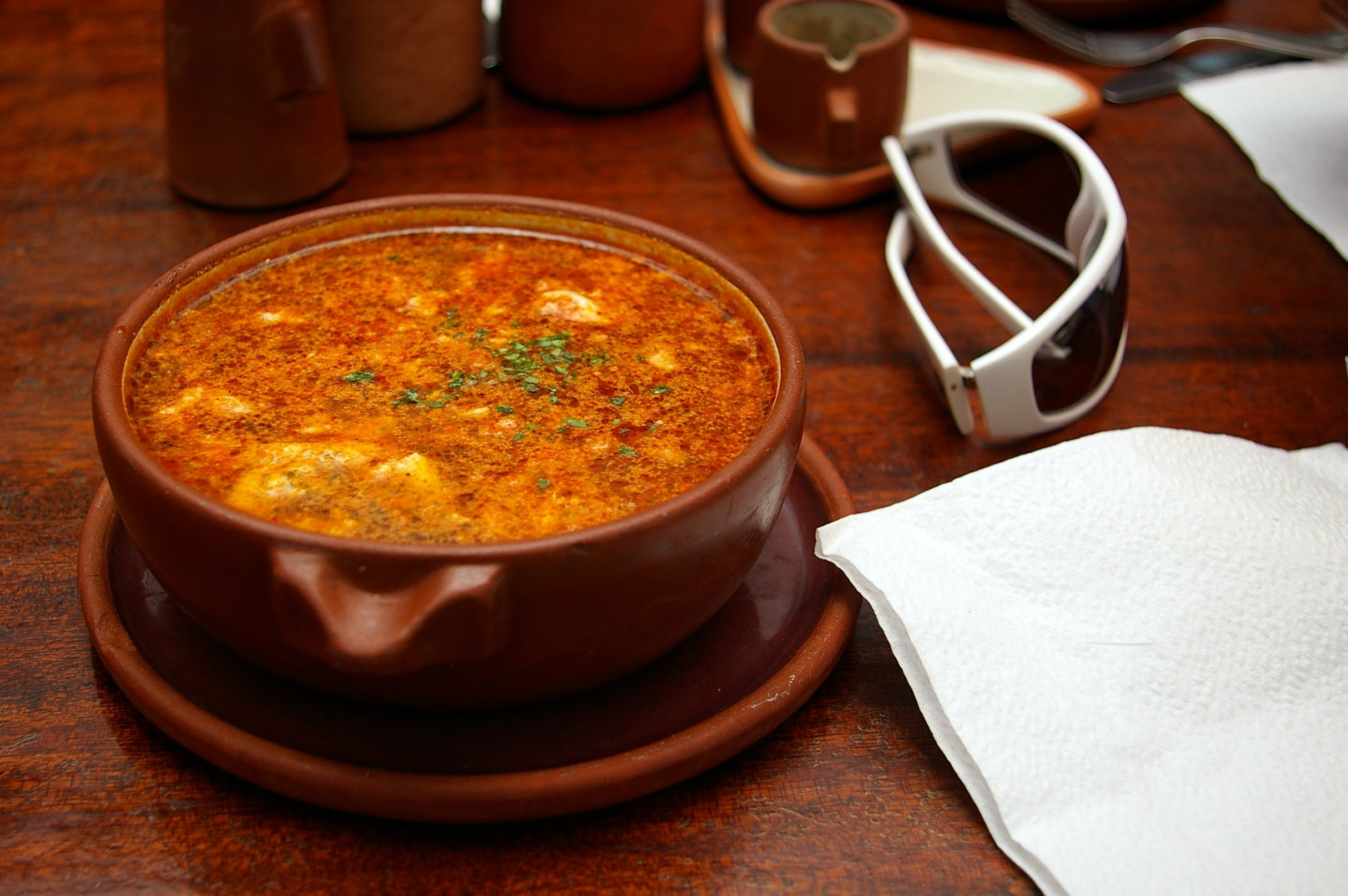
Sopa de ajo (Spanish)

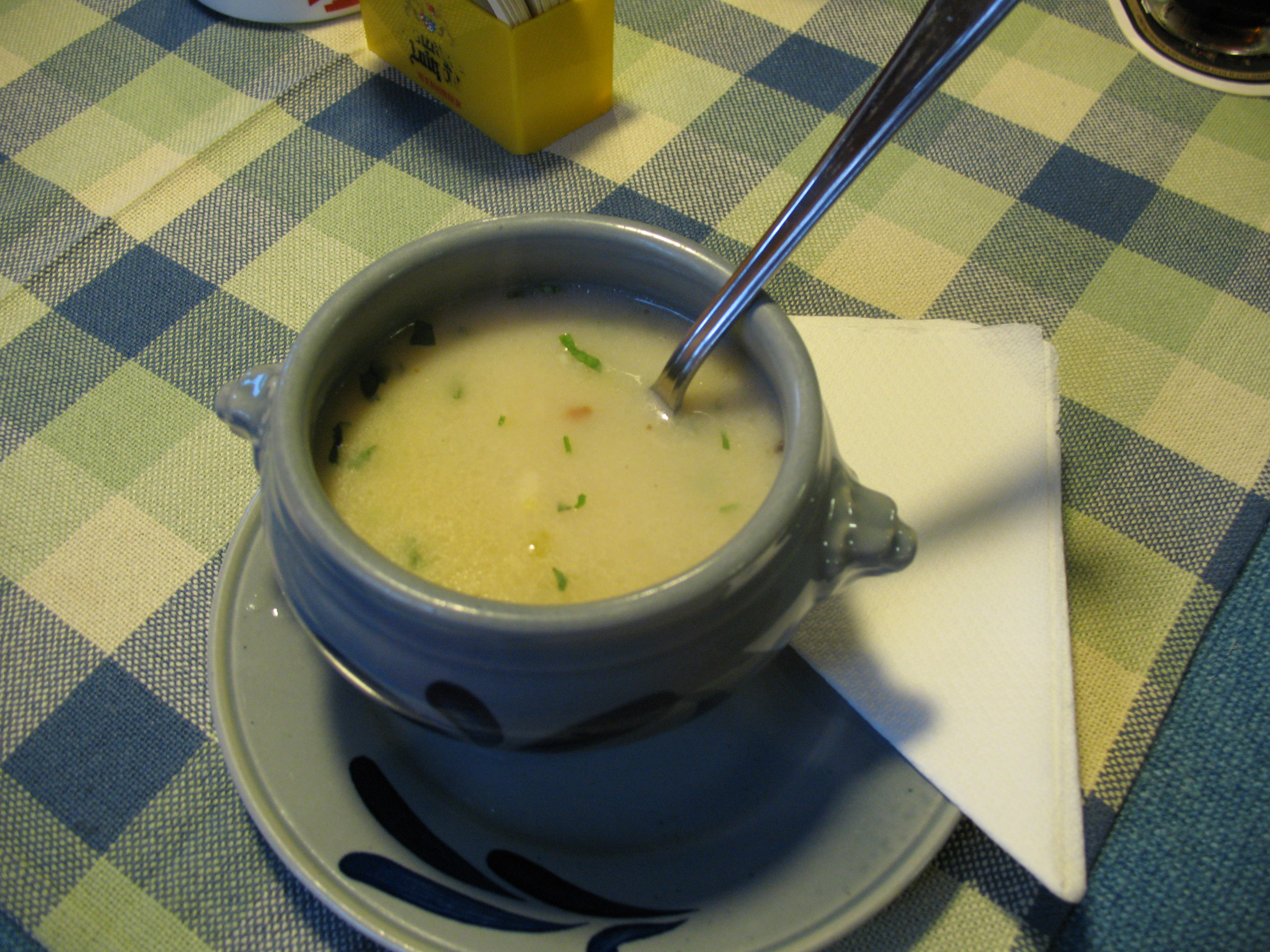
Austrian garlic soup

Garlic soup is a type of soup using garlic as a main ingredient. In Spanish cuisine, sopa de ajo ('soup of garlic') is a traditional garlic soup made with bread and egg poached in chicken broth, and laced with garlic and sherry.

== By country ==
=== Czech Republic ===
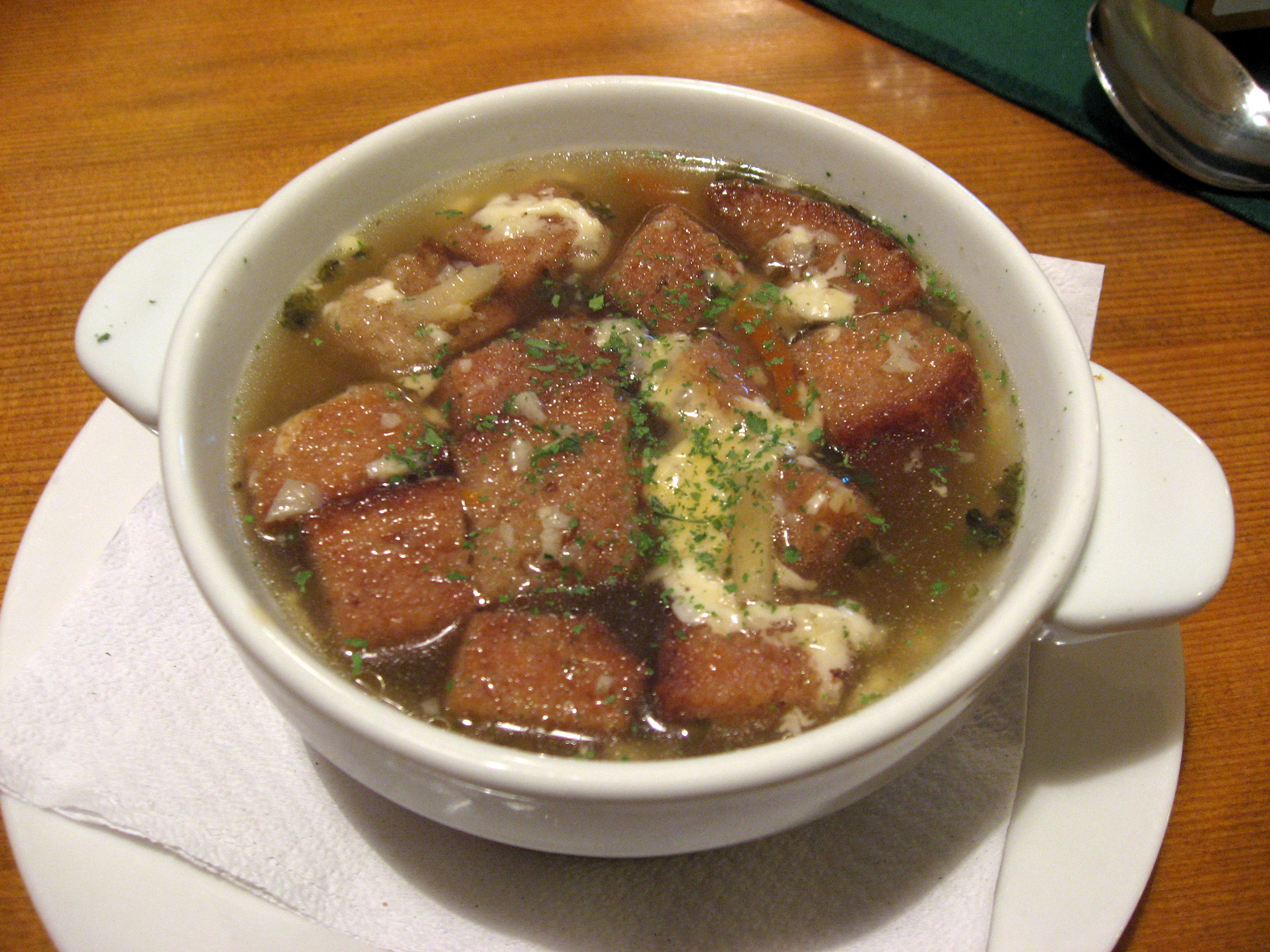
Česnečka (Czech)

In the Czech Republic, garlic soup is called česnečka. It is made with garlic and potatoes and topped with fried bread. Sometimes cheese, ham or eggs are added.

=== France ===
Versions of garlic soup have been prepared in Provence, France.

=== Mexico ===
Versions of garlic soup similar to Spanish versions are prepared in Mexico.

=== Poland ===
In Poland, garlic soup is sometimes called zupa na gwoździu (literally soup on the nail).

In Upper Silesia, the traditional wodzionka soup has a garlic-based version, made with diced garlic, hard-boiled egg, potatoes and fried bread.

=== Slovakia ===
Cesnačka is also a part of Slovak cuisine.

=== Spain ===
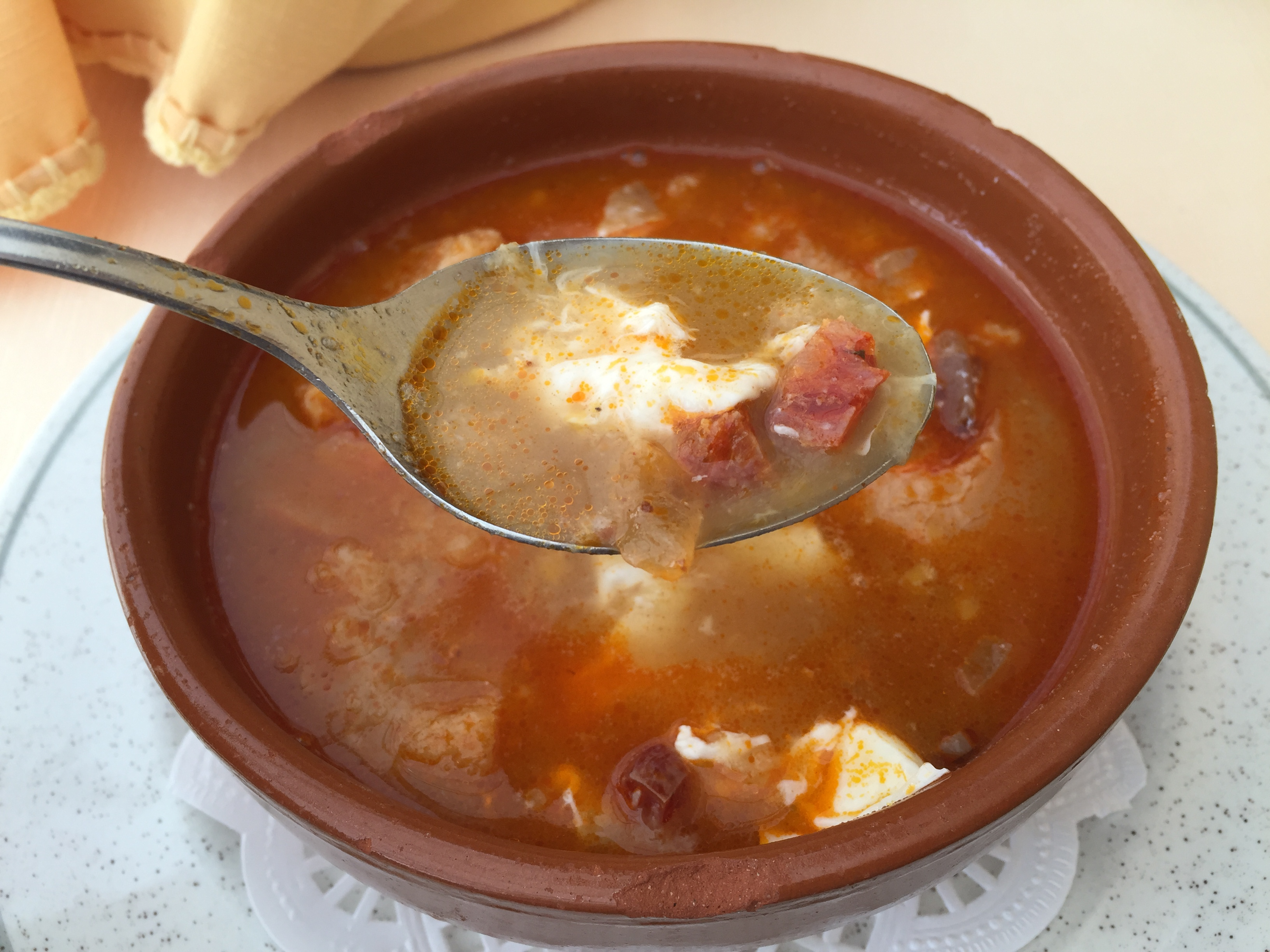
Sopa de ajo

In Spain, egg whites are sometimes whipped into the soup, as with egg drop soup. Sopa de ajo is a traditional winter soup in Palencia and Valladolid where it is made with bread mixed with paprika, water and garlic. It is cooked slowly until the desired degree of thickness, and a raw egg is sometimes whipped into the soup as it is served. Sopa de ajo is also traditional in Castilian-Leonese cuisine and Castilian-Manchego cuisine. In Extremaduran cuisine, sopa blanca de ajos (white bean garlic soup) is a tradition.

== See also ==
- Garlic bread
- List of garlic dishes
- List of soups
