= Campo de Montalbán =

Spanish cheese made from a blend of cows', sheep's and goats' milk in La Mancha

Campo de Montalbán is a semi-firm to firm Spanish cheese made from a blend of cows', sheep's and goats' milk in La Mancha. This cheese resembles manchego in texture and appearance, and until 1985 it was in fact considered a manchego. Campo de Montalbán is distinguished by its three milk blend, while manchego contains only sheep's milk. The flavor is also similar to manchego. However, the characteristics of all three milks are noticeable in Campo de Montalbán.

Campo de Montalban comes in waxed barrel-shaped wheels, with an embossed herringbone design, much like its all-sheep cousin, manchego.

== See also ==
- Spanish cheeses
- List of cheeses
