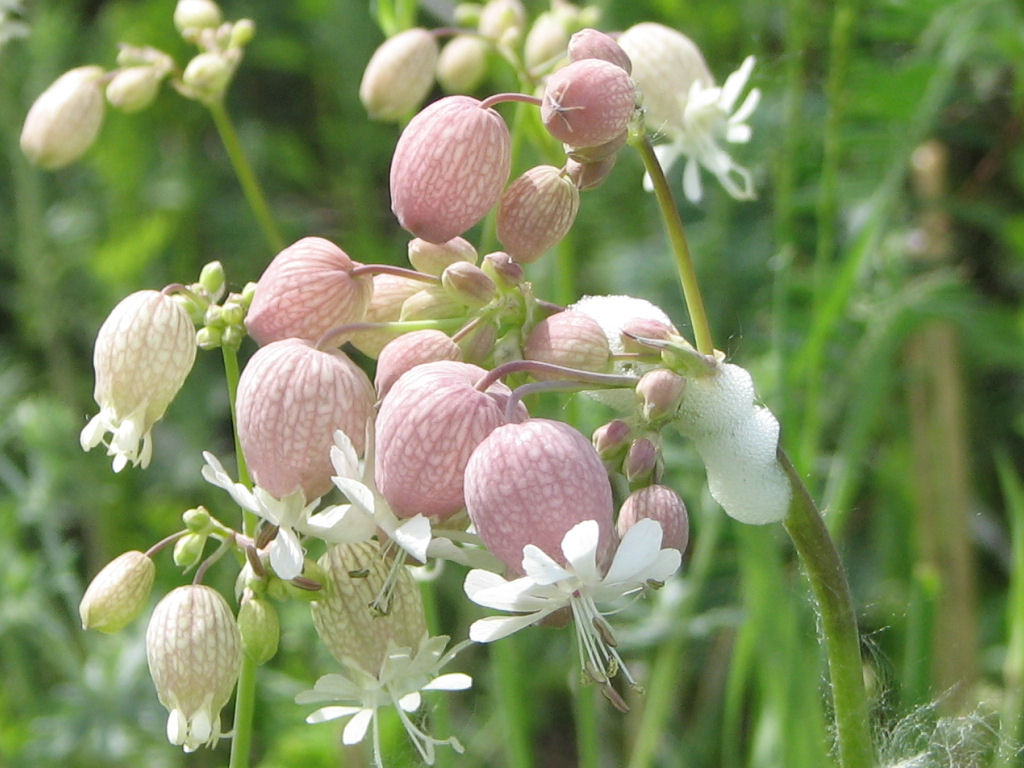

Scientific classification
- Kingdom: Plantae
- Clade: Embryophytes
- Clade: Tracheophytes
- Clade: Spermatophytes
- Clade: Angiosperms
- Clade: Eudicots
- Order: Caryophyllales
- Family: Caryophyllaceae
- Genus: Silene
- Species: S. vulgaris

Binomial name
- Silene vulgaris (Moench) Garcke

Synonyms
- Of the species: Behen oleraceum E.H.L.Krause; Behen vulgaris Moench; Behenantha behen (L.) Ikonn.; Cucubalus behen L.; Oberna behen (L.) Ikonn.; Silene behen var. cucubalus Kuntze; Silene cucubalus Wibel, nom. superfl.; Silene venosa subsp. vulgaris (Moench) Graebn., not validly publ.; Viscago behen (L.) Hornem.

= Silene vulgaris =

Species of flowering plant

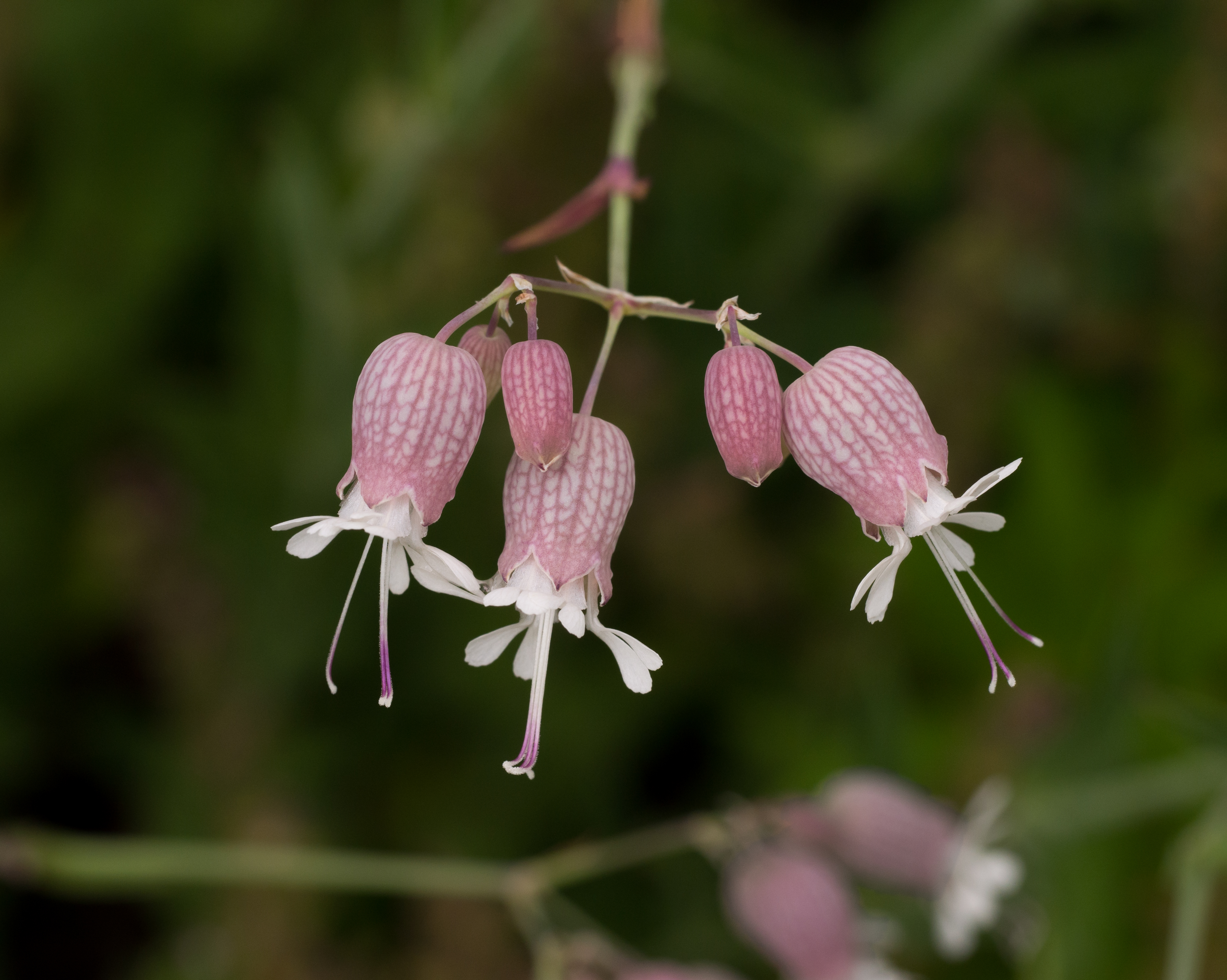
Silene vulgaris flowers

Silene vulgaris, the bladder campion or maidenstears, is a plant species of the genus Silene within the family Caryophyllaceae. Native to the Old World, the plant has been naturalized elsewhere, including North America. The young shoots and leaves are edible.

== Description ==
The plant can reach 60 centimetres (24 inches) in height, with white-petaled flowers up to 1.8 cm (1/2 in) wide.

Similar species include S. noctiflora and S. latifolia.

== Distribution and habitat ==
It is native to Europe, temperate Asia and northern Africa and has been introduced to other parts of the world, particularly North America, where it is now widespread and a common wild flower in meadows, open woods and fields.

== Uses ==
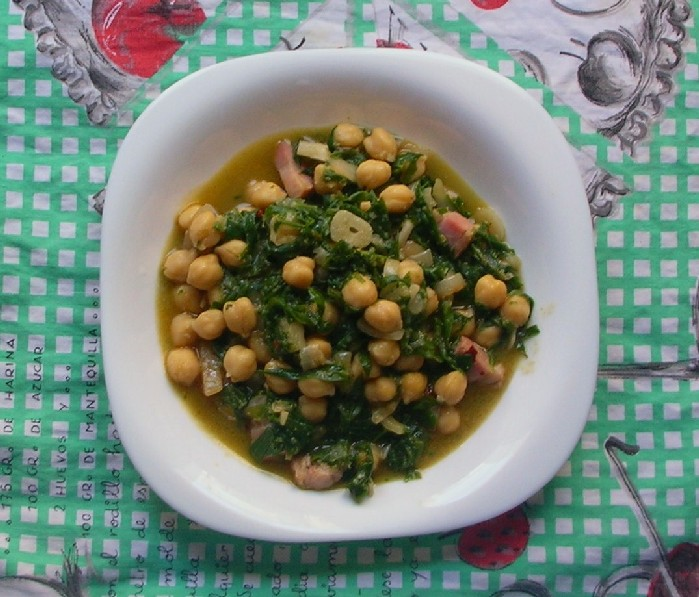
Manchego cuisine; chickpea and Silene vulgaris stew

The young shoots and the tender leaves are sometimes used as food in some countries of the Mediterranean region. These are considered edible raw before the plant flowers and can be used in salads. The older leaves are usually eaten boiled or fried, sauteed with garlic or in omelettes.

=== Crete and Cyprus ===
In Crete it is called agriopapoula (αγριοπάπουλα) and its leaves and tender shoots are eaten browned in olive oil.

In Cyprus it is very widely eaten, so much so that in recent years it has once again been cultivated and sold in shops in bunches. Two of the common Cypriot names are strouthouthkia (στρουθούθκια; [stru'θuθca]) and tsakrithkia (τσακρίδκια; [t͡sa'kriðca]).

=== Italy ===
In Italy the leaves of this plant may be used as an ingredient in risotto. It is commonly known as sculpit, stridolo or by the obsolete scientific name Silene inflata, as well as s-ciopetin, grixol in Veneto and nenkuz or sclopit in Friuli and cojet in Piedmont.

=== Spain ===
In the La Mancha region of Spain, where S. vulgaris leaves are valued as a green vegetable, there used to be people known as collejeros who picked and sold these plants. Leaves are small and narrow so it takes many plants to obtain a sizeable amount.

In La Mancha, the leaves, locally known as collejas, were mainly used to prepare gazpacho viudo (widower gazpacho), consisting of flatbread known as tortas de gazpacho and a stew prepared with 'the leaves. Other dishes prepared with these leaves in Spain include potaje de garbanzos y collejas, huevos revueltos con collejas and arroz con collejas.

== See also ==
- List of leaf vegetables
