= Alcarreña =

Breed of sheep

- Country of origin: Spain
- Use: Meat

Traits
- Wool color: White
- Face color: White
- Horn status: Polled (hornless)

The Alcarreña is a domesticated breed of sheep found in Spain. They are bred for their meat. The Alcarreña is a member of the entrefino class of sheep.

== Characteristics ==
The Alcarreña are white but are occasionally all black with light brown markings on the head and legs. Rams and ewes are polled (hornless).
