= Alajú =

Traditional Castilian dessert

Alajú or alajuz is a Castilian cake originating in Cuenca in Spain. It is traditionally made with an almond base, roasted bread crumbs, spices, and honey. It is then covered with two wafers on the sides of the base. Almonds may be substituted with other nuts, such as pine nuts.

== History ==
In its most authentic form, Alajú is made in parts of Valencia bordering Castilla-La Mancha–especially in Ademuz and the Utiel-Requena region. Traditionally, the Utiel-Requena region is more Castilian, than Valencian–it was after all a part of the province of Cuenca until 1851.

The cake is most popular in the municipality of Moratalla in northwest Murcia, near Alcarria. This is probably because honey is widely available in that region.

The word Alajú comes from the Arabic term "Al-hasu", meaning "filling".

It was also a typical dessert in Tudela, Spain, and is similar to a version currently eaten in Cuenca. A "lost dessert", it was revived from historical recipes. It is usually made with two Turrones–nougats made of honey and almonds, respectively called "miel royo" and "turrón royo". These differ from alajú as they do not include breadcrumbs.

== See also ==
- Alfajor – Hispanic sweet dessert
