= Migas =

Spanish and Portuguese dish

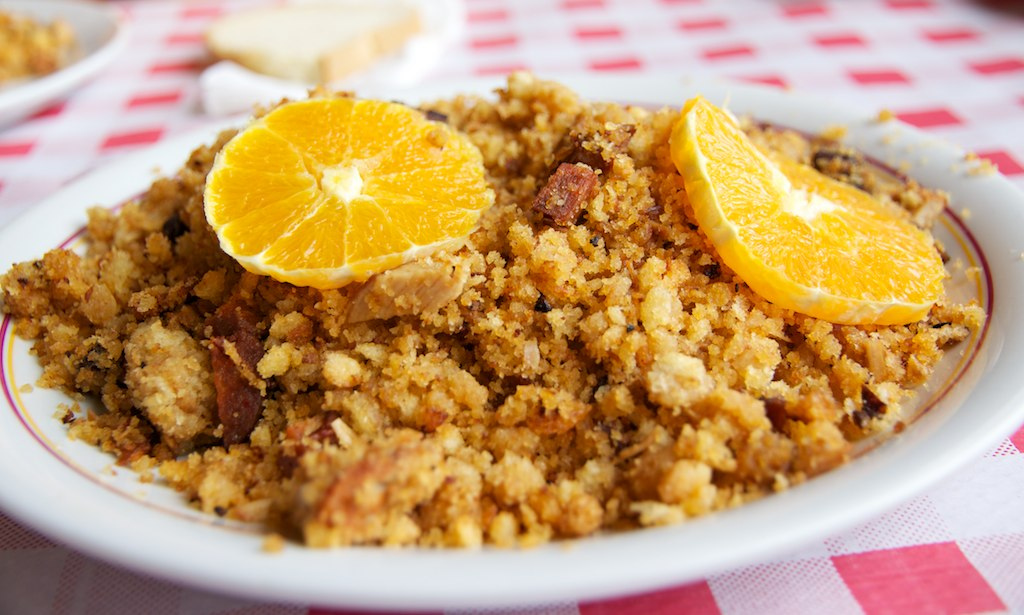
- Migas with oranges
- Alternative names: Migajas
- Course: Appetiser
- Place of origin: Iberia
- Serving temperature: Warm
- Main ingredients: Bread

Migas (Spanish pronunciation: [ˈmiɣas], Portuguese pronunciation: [ˈmiɣɐʃ]) ("crumbs" in English) is a dish traditionally made from stale bread and other ingredients in Spanish and Portuguese cuisines. Originally introduced by shepherds, migas are very popular across the Iberian Peninsula, and are the typical breakfast of hunters at monterías in some regions of Spain.

The same name is used for a different dish made from maize or flour tortillas in Mexican and Tex-Mex cuisines.

== Iberian migas ==
=== Spanish migas ===
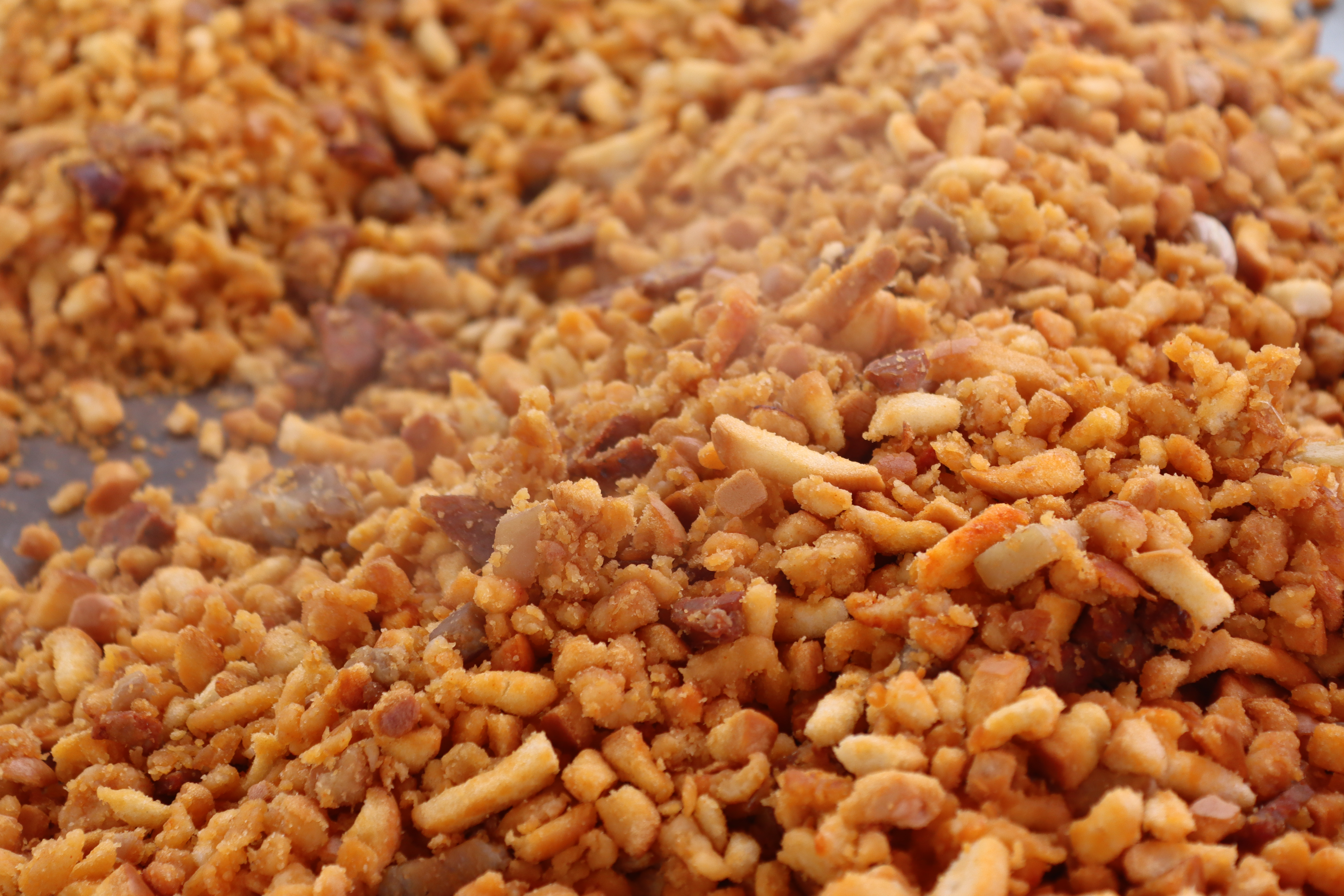
Migas from Campo de Criptana.

Migas is a traditional dish in Spanish cuisine. It was originally a breakfast dish among shepherds that made use of leftover bread or tortas. It gained greater uptake as shepherds, cooking on small braziers while moving their sheep along transhumance routes, spread the dish to rural laborers. It regained popularity during the early 20th century, and as of 2011 was sold by restaurants across Spain, and in supermarkets, vacuum-sealed and ready to be heated. The most suitable Spanish bread for making migas is called "candeal", due to its dense and spongy crumb. Migas is usually served as a first course for lunch or dinner in restaurants in Spain.

The ingredients of migas vary across the provinces of Spain. In Extremadura, this dish includes day-old bread soaked in water, garlic, paprika, and olive oil. In Teruel, Aragon, migas includes chorizo and bacon, and is often served with grapes. In La Mancha, migas manchegas is a more elaborate preparation using basically the same ingredients as Aragonese migas. In Granada, Almería and Murcia, in southeastern Spain, migas is similar to North African couscous, using flour and water, but no bread. Preparations commonly feature a variety of ingredients, including fish. Andalusian migas is often eaten with sardines as a tapa, in the form of fried breadcrumbs. In some places the dish is eaten on the morning of the matanza (butchery) and is served with a stew including curdled blood, liver, kidneys, and other offal. Traditionally eaten right after butchering a pig, a sheep or a goat, migas is often cooked over an open stove or coals. In Almería, migas is a staple dish when it rains, yet the reason is still subject to much discussion.

=== Portuguese migas ===
Migas is also a traditional dish in Portuguese cuisine. It is usually made with leftover bread, either pao Alentejano, a wheat bread traditionally associated with the Alentejo region in Southern Portugal, or corn bread as used in Beira. In Alentejo, migas can also be made with potatoes (migas de batata) instead of bread.

Garlic and olive oil are necessary ingredients. Other ingredients such as pork meat drippings, wild asparagus, tomato, and seasonings such as red pepper paste and fresh coriander are usually included in Alentejo, while in Beira, the other ingredients typically include cooked collard cut in caldo verde style, cooked beans (pinto, black-eyed peas or kidney beans), and sometimes cooked rice.

Migas usually accompanies meats or other main dishes.

== North American migas ==
=== Mexican migas ===
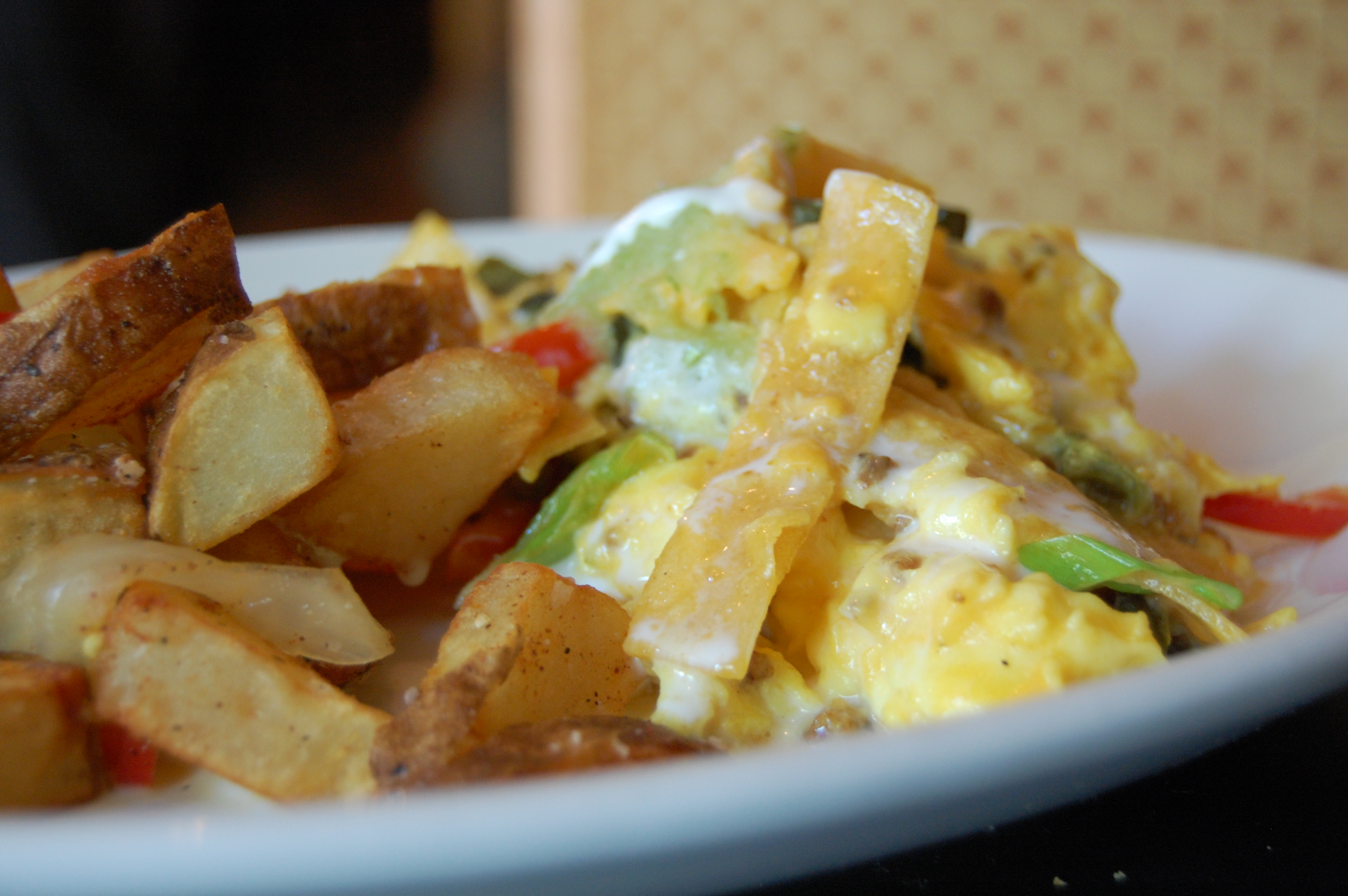
Tex-Mex migas

In different areas of Mexico, migas is a traditional breakfast dish consisting of crispy crumbled corn tortilla chips, to which scrambled eggs are mixed in. This preparation makes use of hardened corn tortillas left over from previous meals. Chilaquiles is a similar meal with whole fried tortilla chips and salsa, where eggs or chicken are added during the cooking process. Both are hearty, inexpensive working-class breakfast meals.

=== Mexico City migas ===
Mexico City also has its own version of migas. It is a garlic soup which is thickened with sliced day-old bolillos (bread). It is usually flavored with pork shanks, ham bones, epazote, oregano and different types of dried chillies. A raw egg is usually added to each plate when served and it is slowly cooked by the warm soup, similar to egg drop soup. It is a very popular dish in fondas around downtown Mexico City, especially in Tepito.

=== "A la mexicana" ===
There is another variation of migas - "migas a la mexicana" - which includes additional ingredients; diced white onion, sliced jalapeño, or serrano pepper and diced fresh tomato. These ingredients together represent the colors of the flag of Mexico. Green from the jalapeño or serrano, white from the onion, and red from the tomato.

Migas are typically served with refried beans, and corn or flour tortillas may be used to enfold all of the ingredients into tacos. Migas breakfast tacos are popular in Texas.

In some areas, it may have been traditionally eaten during Lent.

== See also ==
- Acquacotta
- Chilaquiles, another Mexican dish based on cooking tortillas
- Fit-fit or fir-fir – a spicy breakfast dish in Ethiopia and Eritrea made with shredded flatbread and clarified butter
- Gachas
- French toast
- Kothu parotta, a somewhat similar dish popular in the South Indian state of Tamil Nadu and in Tamil-speaking areas of Sri Lanka
- List of Portuguese dishes
- Matzah brei, a somewhat similar Ashkenazi breakfast dish in which matzoh is used instead of tortillas
- Panzanella
- Sandwiches de miga, Argentine sandwiches, of which miga refers to the crustless bread
- Tacos
- Torta de gazpacho

== Bibliography ==
- Sánchez Garrido, Roberto (2013). Caza, cazadores y medio ambiente: breve etnografía cinegética. Editorial Club Universitario. ISBN 978-84-99481-61-6.
