= Torta de gazpacho =

Type of flatbread

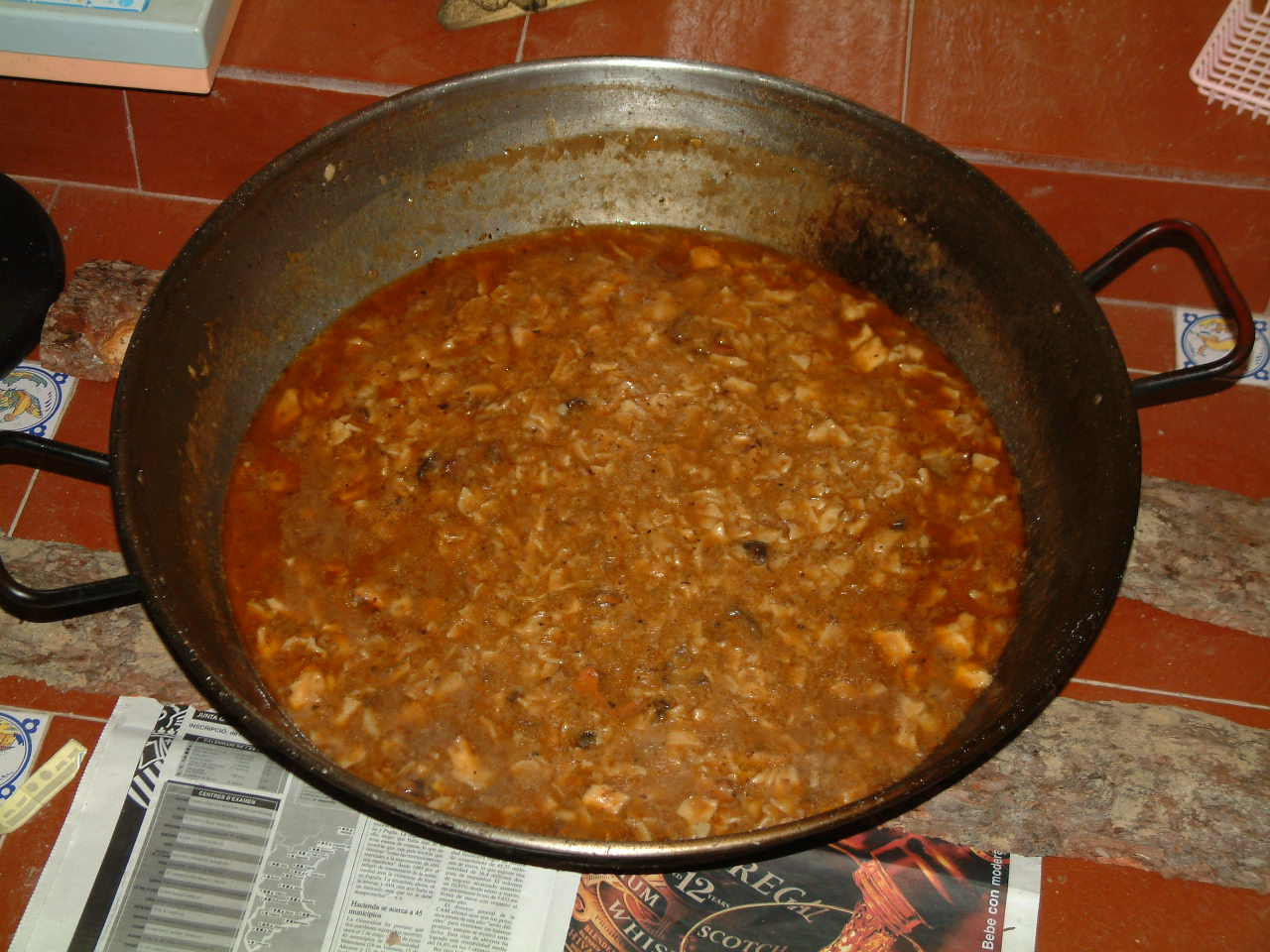
- Gazpacho de Requena
- Alternative names: Torta gazpachera, gaspacho oranais
- Type: Torta or flatbread
- Place of origin: Spain
- Main ingredients: Wheat flour

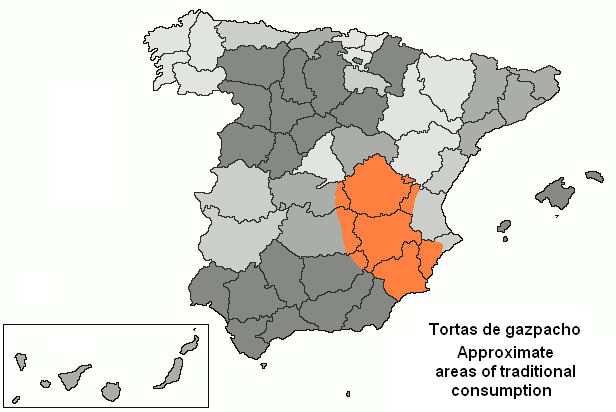
Approximate areas of traditional torta de gazpacho consumption in Spain

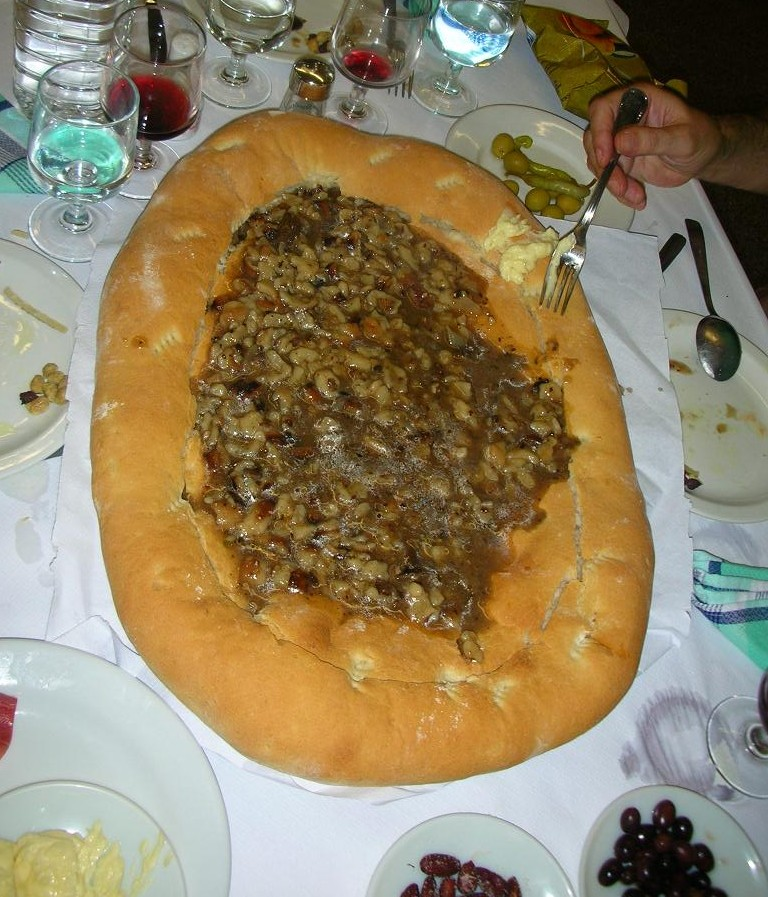
Gazpacho in Castalla before putting the pieces of quail on top

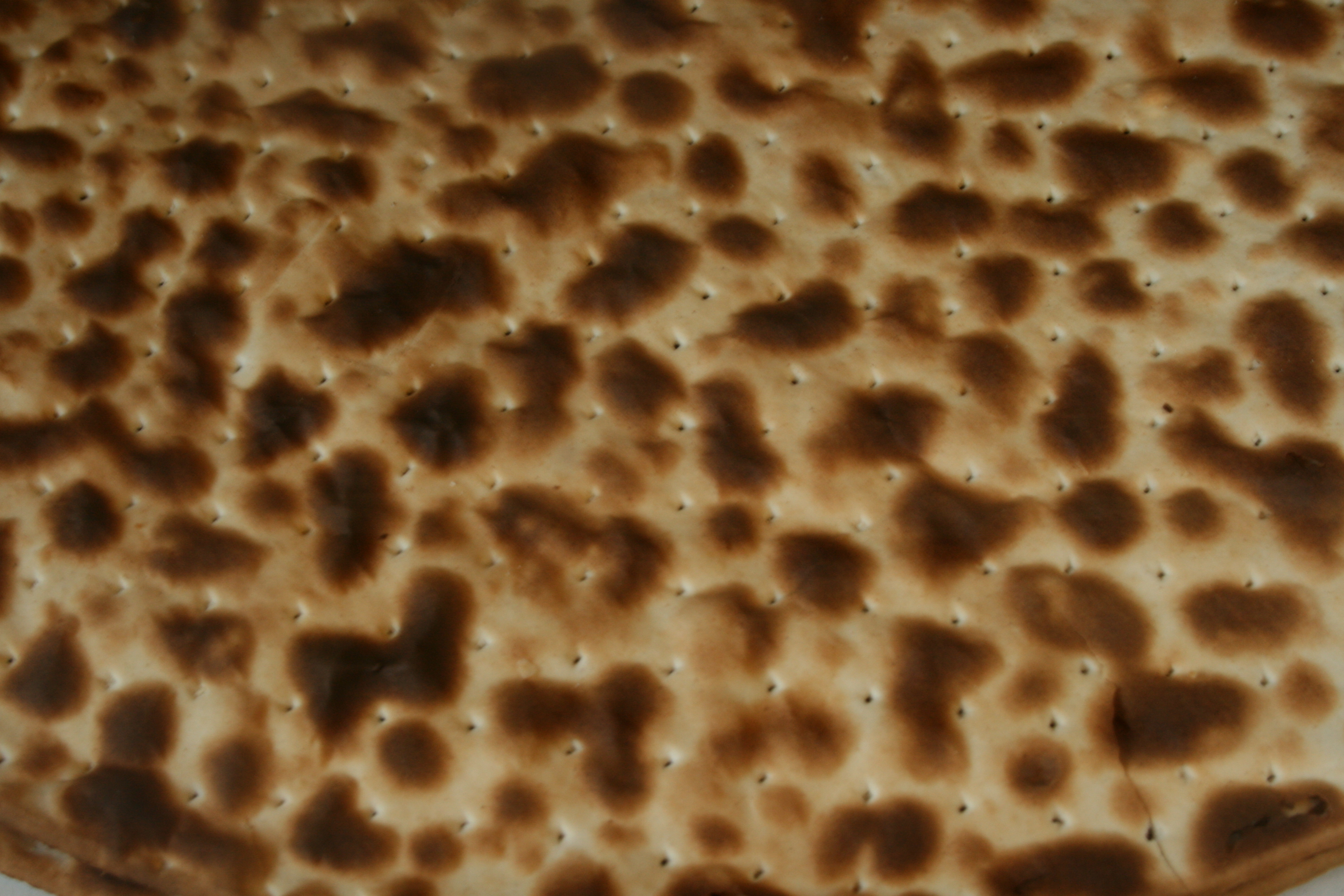
Torta cenceña made in La Roda

Torta de gazpacho is a type of torta, or flat bread, used to prepare a dish called gazpacho or gazpacho manchego in La Mancha and Southeast Spain, including Murcia and parts of the autonomous community of Valencia. The word gazpacho comes from the Latin adjective caccabaceus, derived from caccabus ('cauldron'), attested in several works by Tertulian, Zeno of Verona and others. This word was applied in ancient Rome to a type of bread very similar to the torta de gazpacho.

A torta de gazpacho, also known as torta de pastor, is a flat and round bread made with wheat flour without yeast. Along with the gachas the tortas de gazpacho are a very ancient Iberian staple food preparation. Traditionally Manchega women used to bake their own tortas at home, but now a commercial type of torta de gazpacho is produced in La Roda under the name "torta cenceña".

To prepare gazpachos the flat bread is torn or cut into small pieces and mixed with a somewhat liquid stew in order to prepare a warm dish. This dish originated in the hearty food shepherds needed when they came back home on cold winter nights. It is traditional to serve this dish by placing the pan or large plate in the middle and all the guests sitting around eating from it. Sometimes instead of the plate the gazpacho is poured on a very large flat bread.

This type of gazpacho should not be confused with the Andalusian cold soup also called gazpacho.

== Variants ==
=== Castile-La Mancha ===
- To prepare the gazpachos manchegos, perhaps the most well-known, the torta de gazpacho is cut into pieces and mixed with a quail-based stew; pigeon, hare or rabbit may be added or used instead. It is a very common dish in La Mancha area. The stew is usually condimented with bay leaves, garlic and thyme.
- The gazpachos jumillanos or gazpacho de chumilla is similar to the manchego type but includes also land snails in the stew. It is typical of the Jumilla and Elche area.
- The gazpacho de Yecla or "gazpacho con chaleco" are roasted or braised sardines wrapped in tortas de gazpacho, a speciality of the Yecla area.

=== Valencia ===
- Gazpachos in the Valencian area include the gazpacho de Requena, identical to the gazpacho manchego, but with the tortas cut into very small pieces and almost exclusively a quail stew. At Ayora (Vall de Cofrents) the stew is made with rabbit and is known as gazpacho de monte. In Castalla, Onil and Ibi (L'Alcoià), local mushrooms are added to the stew.
- The gazpacho de mero is a fish-based version where the pieces of torta are previously boiled in the fish broth. The fish preferred for this dish is the grouper; it may also contained peeled prawns and it is very popular in the Alacantí and Baix Vinalopó comarcas.

=== Other places ===
- Emigrants from southeast Spain brought this dish with them to northwestern Algeria, where it became a dish of the Algerian cuisine on its own right known as gaspacho oranais, after the city of Oran. This dish is not only still popular in Oran, but also in other cities of the coast, such as Mostaganem. The way this dish is prepared and served is also similar to another Algerian dish known as chakhchoukha.

=== Gazpachos viudos ===
There are ways of preparing torta de gazpacho-based dishes without meat. In ancient times when meat or game was scarce, gazpachos were prepared with a vegetable stew. The main ingredient of the stew were seasonal vegetables, like zucchini, bell pepper and eggplant, especially in the comarcas of the Region of Murcia. In La Mancha, a much less fertile region, bladder campion (Silene vulgaris) leaves were used for the stew instead of the meat.

Traditionally the vegetarian gazpachos were considered inferior fare, only to be eaten in difficult times or by the poor people. Therefore, they were known as gazpachos viudos (widowed gazpachos); the reference to a widower originating in the fact that an essential ingredient was missing. Presently spinach may be used instead of the bladder campion leaves.

== See also ==
- Castilian-Manchego cuisine
- List of African dishes
- Migas
