= Manchega =

Breed of sheep

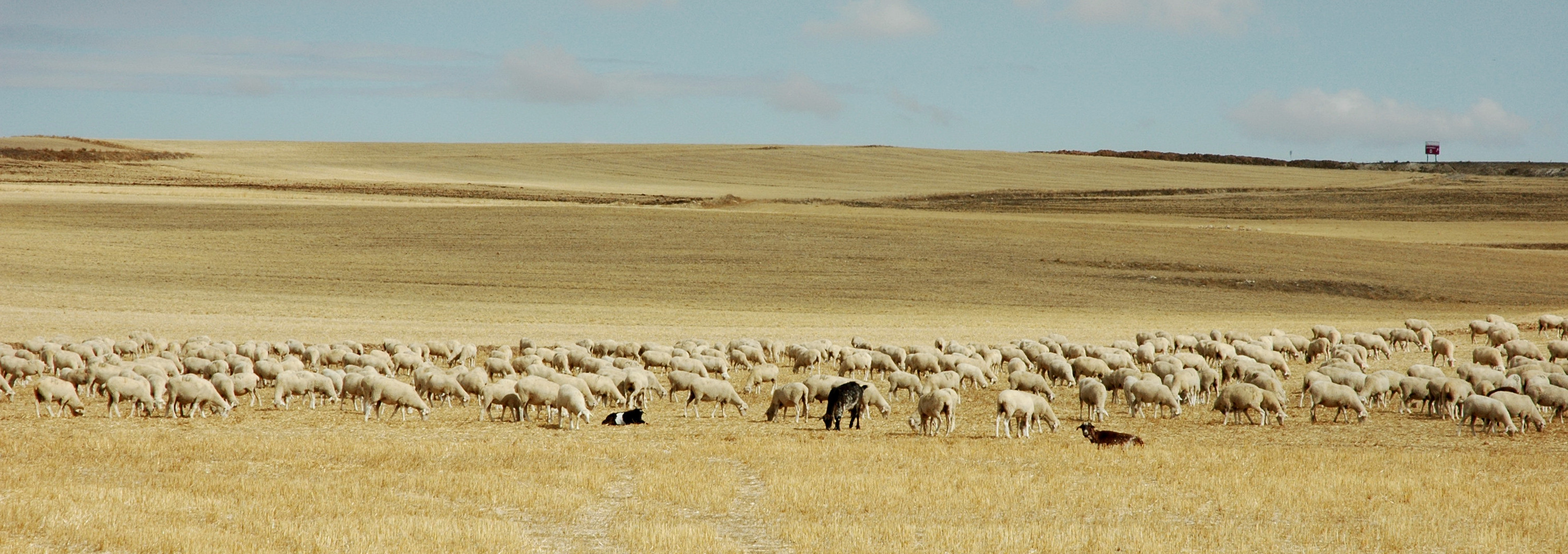
- A herd of Manchega in La Mancha
- Country of origin: Spain
- Distribution: Primarily in La Mancha
- Use: Dual purpose; dairy and meat

Traits
- Weight: Male: 85-90 kg; Female: 55-60 kg
- Height: Male: 76 cm; Female: 68 cm
- Wool color: White or Black
- Horn status: Both sexes polled

The Manchega is a breed of sheep native to the La Mancha region of Spain. The Manchega is most famous for producing the milk that is used to produce Manchego cheese, a very popular Spanish sheep's milk cheese.

== Origins ==
Manchega sheep are native to the La Mancha plateau in New Castile. The Manchega sheep's ancestors were known as Ovis aries ligeries, and migrated across the Pyrenees and much of northern Spain before finally settling in La Mancha. The breed was domesticated by the early residents of La Mancha and bred to its current state. The Manchega were typically only bred among themselves and were seldom crossbred, resulting in a remarkably pure bloodline among today's animals. As a result, the Manchega's characteristics have remained relatively unchanged over the past several centuries.

== Characteristics ==
The Manchega is a medium-sized, entrefino type sheep. The Manchega come in two colors, white and black, although the white Manchega comprises the vast majority of the animals, with roughly 90% of Manchega possessing this coloration. Both sexes of Manchega are polled. The sheep is of a medium weight and height, with rams typically weighing 85-90 kilograms and standing 76 centimeters tall, and ewes weighing 55-60 kilograms and standing 68 centimeters tall. The Manchega's wool has a staple length of about 14-16 centimeters and a fiber diameter of 26-8 microns. They are a medium wool breed. There are also three different sub types of Manchega: the alcarreña (also known as manchega pequeña), the montesina and the black manchega.

== Use and raising ==
The most famous product from Manchega sheep is the Manchego cheese made from their milk. True Manchego cheese must be made from the whole milk of Manchega sheep raised in La Mancha. In La Mancha, Manchego are primarily raised for dairy production, but elsewhere their use is more diversified and they may be raised for meat as well. The Manchega has an annual milk production of about 100 liters (26.2 gallons) a year, with production greatly increasing in the months of April, May, and June, and consequently decreasing the rest of the year. The milking is often done by hand.

In La Mancha, Manchega are typically raised in flocks of 100–600, although herds of up to 2,000 sheep have been known to exist. Typically they are able to graze year-round on the grassy plains of La Mancha, although they may be fed supplementary feeds, especially during lactation or pregnancy. Their feed is often also supplemented in the fall and winter with tendrils from vines and stubble from cropland.

The Manchega's genetics have also played a role in the development of two other breeds: the Segureña and Talaverana.
