= Cucureasa River =

Cucureasa River may refer to the following rivers in Romania:

- Cucureasa, a tributary of the Ilva in Bistrița-Năsăud County
- Cucureasa, a tributary of the Teșna in Suceava County

== See also ==
- Cuca River (disambiguation)
- Cucuieți River (disambiguation)
