= La Roda =

- Municipality
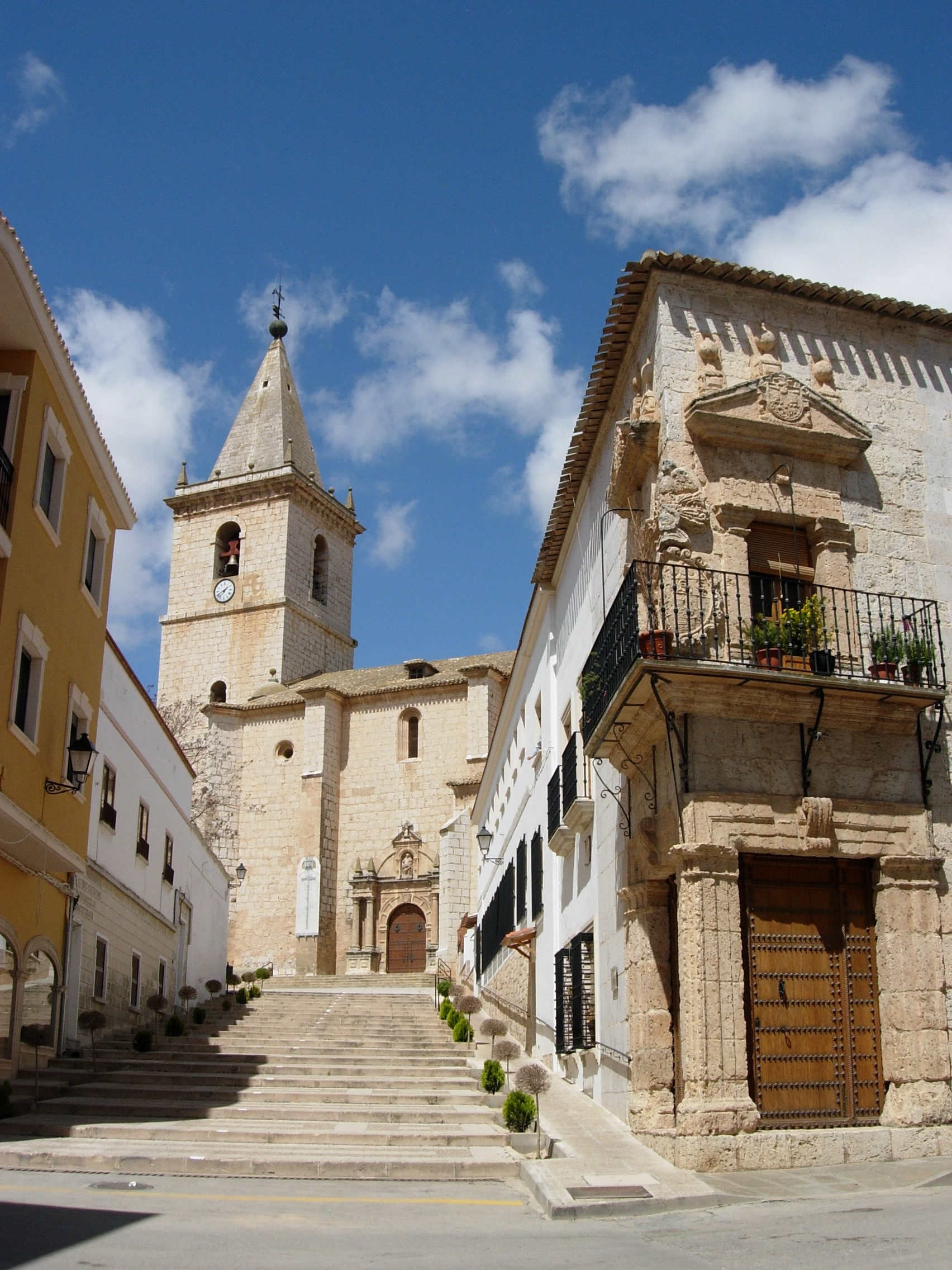

- Flag Coat of arms

- Location La Roda (Spain)
- Country: Spain
- Autonomous community: Castile-La Mancha
- Province: Albacete
- Judicial district: La Roda is the legal district no. 5 of its province.

Government
  - Mayor: Juan Ramón Amores García (PSOE)

Area
  - Total: 398.88 km^{2} (154.01 sq mi)

Population (2023)
  - Total: 15,542
- Demonym(s): Rodense, rodeño/-a (Spanish)
- Time zone: UTC+1 (CET)
  - Summer (DST): UTC+2 (CEST)
- Postal code: 02630

La Roda (Spanish: [la ˈroða]) is a Spanish municipality located in the Province of Albacete, within the autonomous community of Castilla-La Mancha. It is situated along the A-31 highway and has a population of 15,527 inhabitants (INE, 2020). The town is known for its pastry known as miguelitos. It is part of the La Mancha region of Albacete.

== Toponymy ==
There are two possible origins for the town's name. One theory suggests that it could derive from the Arabic word رتبة (rutba), meaning "a place where livestock taxes were collected." Alternatively, it might also come from the Arabic word ربط (rubṭ), meaning "mounted patrol," which evolved into the word robda in Spanish.

== Geography ==
La Roda is located in the northern part of the Province of Albacete, strategically positioned as a communication hub between central Spain and the Spanish Levante via the A-31 and N-301 highways. It lies 40 kilometers (25 miles) from Albacete.

The extensive municipal area features a flat terrain characteristic of the La Mancha Alta Albaceteña region. It is situated 716 meters (2349 feet) above sea level, with the southwestern edge of the municipality reaching higher elevations (over 850 meters, 2788 feet) near the Campo de Montiel.

== History ==
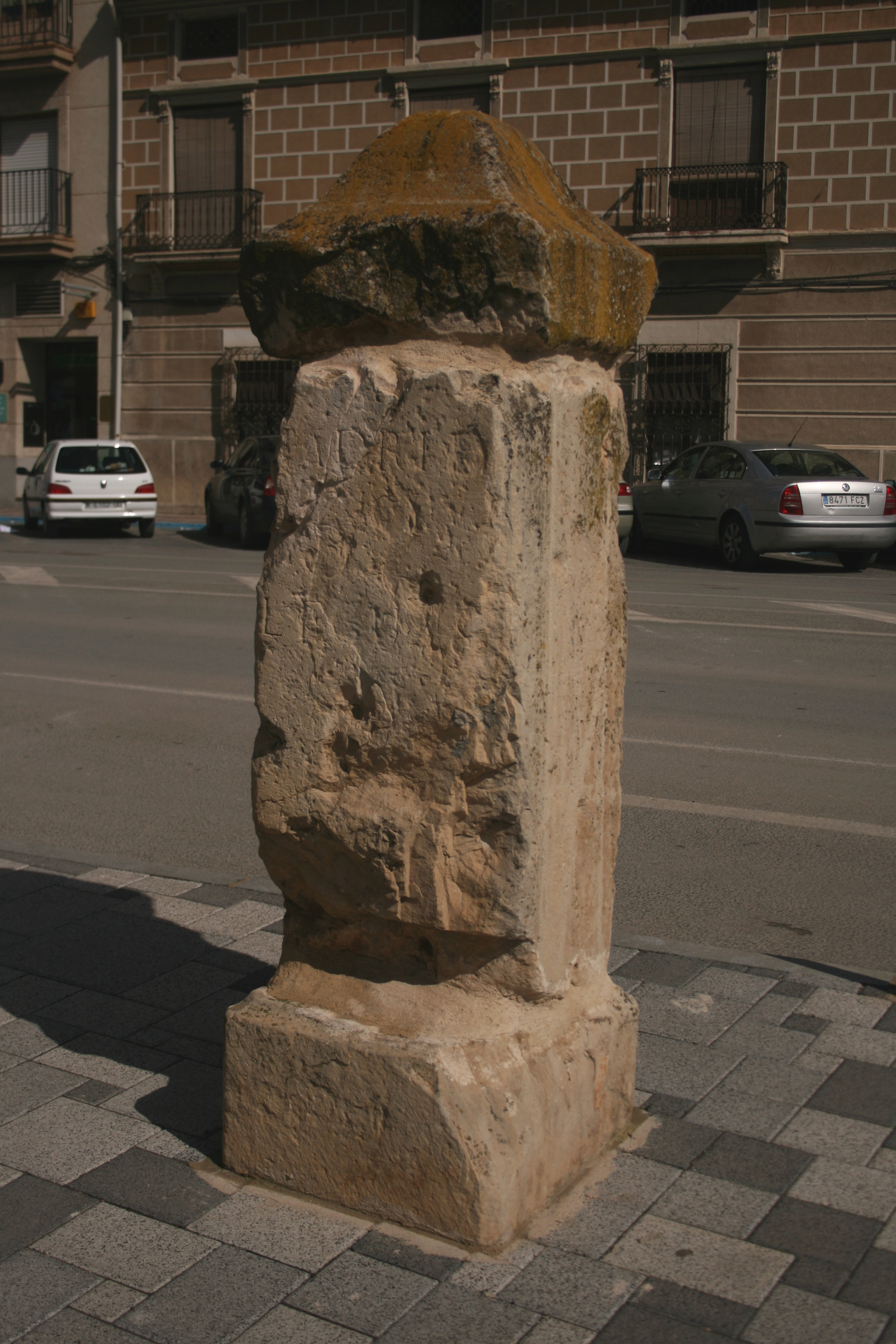
Milepost from the Roman period

Although it is not precisely known when the lands now comprising the municipality of La Roda were first inhabited, the area has historically been a crossroads, and archaeological finds include Celtiberian and Roman remains.

The town came under the protection of the infante Saúl García Nesta when, in 1305, King Ferdinand IV granted him the lands forming the Lordship of Alarcón. The municipal boundaries were established by Don Juan Manuel in 1310. Later, La Roda was part of the Marquisate of Villena until it seceded in 1476 and was incorporated into the Crown of the Catholic Monarchs.

During the Renaissance, the town experienced significant economic growth, evident in the local art and various buildings.

== Demographics ==
The population of the municipality of La Roda is 15,527 inhabitants (INE, 2020).

Historical population

Year	Pop.	±%
1842	5,308	—
1857	6,141	+15.7%
1860	5,890	−4.1%
1877	5,995	+1.8%
1887	6,701	+11.8%
1897	6,757	+0.8%
1900	7,067	+4.6%

Year	Pop.	±%
1910	8,035	+13.7%
1920	9,234	+14.9%
1930	10,147	+9.9%
1940	11,337	+11.7%
1950	12,313	+8.6%
1960	12,307	−0.0%
1970	11,852	−3.7%

Year	Pop.	±%
1981	12,532	+5.7%
1991	13,168	+5.1%
2001	13,959	+6.0%
2011	16,325	+16.9%
2021	15,513	−5.0%

- 1842 and 1877–2021: Legal population according to the censuses of the INE.
- 1857 and 1860: De facto population according to the censuses of the INE.

== Economy ==
Traditionally an agricultural town, in recent years La Roda has focused its economic activity on the industrial sector and services.

The chemical industry plays a significant role, with several factories dedicated to producing paints. This is due to the presence of "white earth" deposits within the municipal area, a raw material used in the manufacture of distemper and other coatings.

The food industry is represented by companies producing typical La Mancha products such as wines and cheeses. La Roda is also the only town with industries manufacturing the torta cenceña, a key ingredient in gazpachos manchegos.

The transportation sector has seen significant growth due to the town's geographical location and the many transport links that pass through it.

La Roda is also an important commercial hub, attracting residents from nearby towns.

== Transportation ==
La Roda is one of the key transportation hubs in the southeastern part of Spain’s national road network. It serves as a junction between the toll highway AP-36 (La Roda–Ocaña) and the A-31. The municipality is also traversed by the national highway N-301 (Ocaña–Cartagena).

In terms of rail connections, La Roda is served by several important lines, including the Madrid-Albacete-Murcia-Cartagena line, the Alcázar de San Juan-Valencia line, and the Ciudad Real-Alicante line.

== Heritage ==
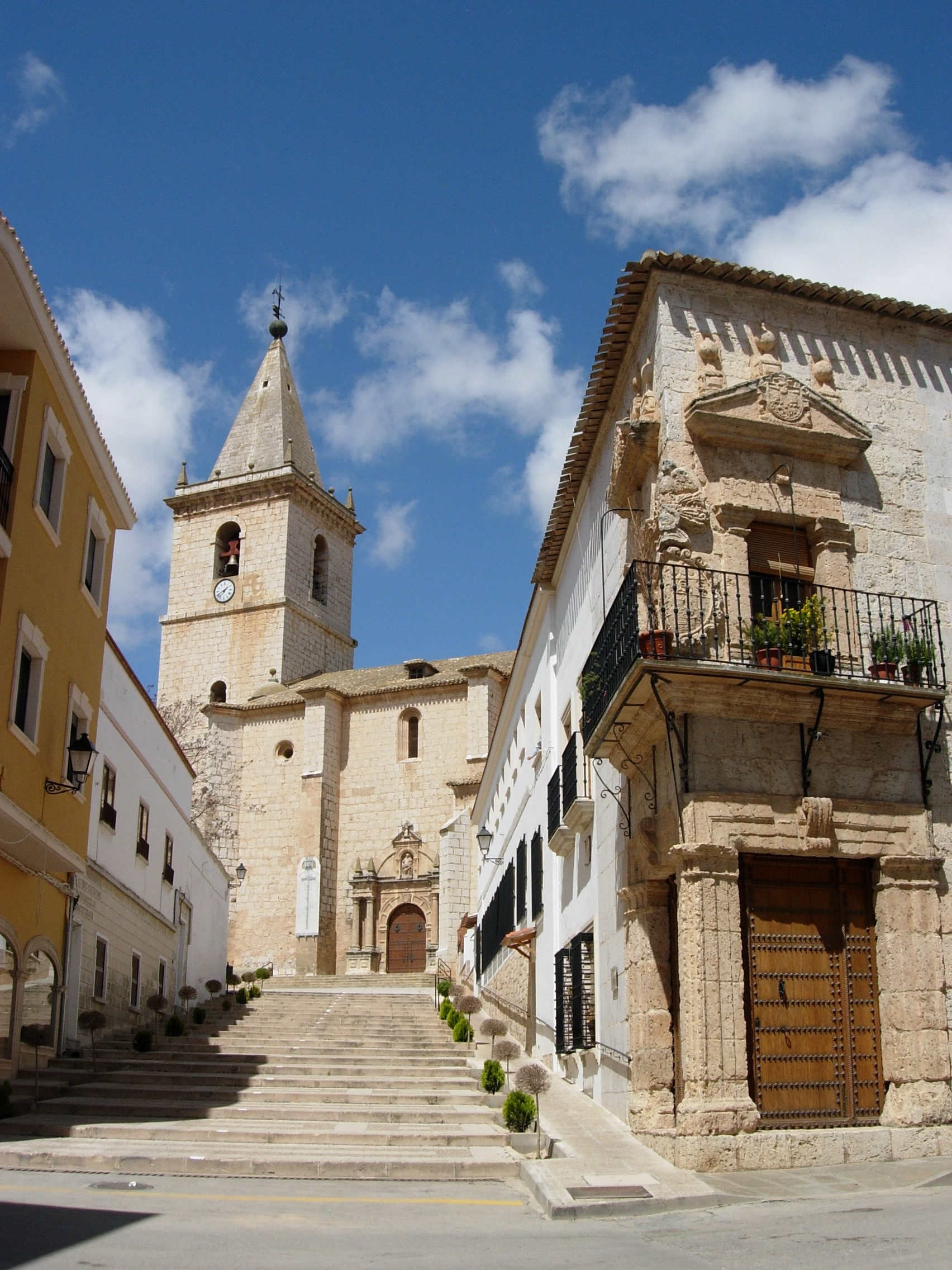
View of Pedro Carrasco Street, with the corner of Alcañabate in the foreground and the Church of El Salvador in the background

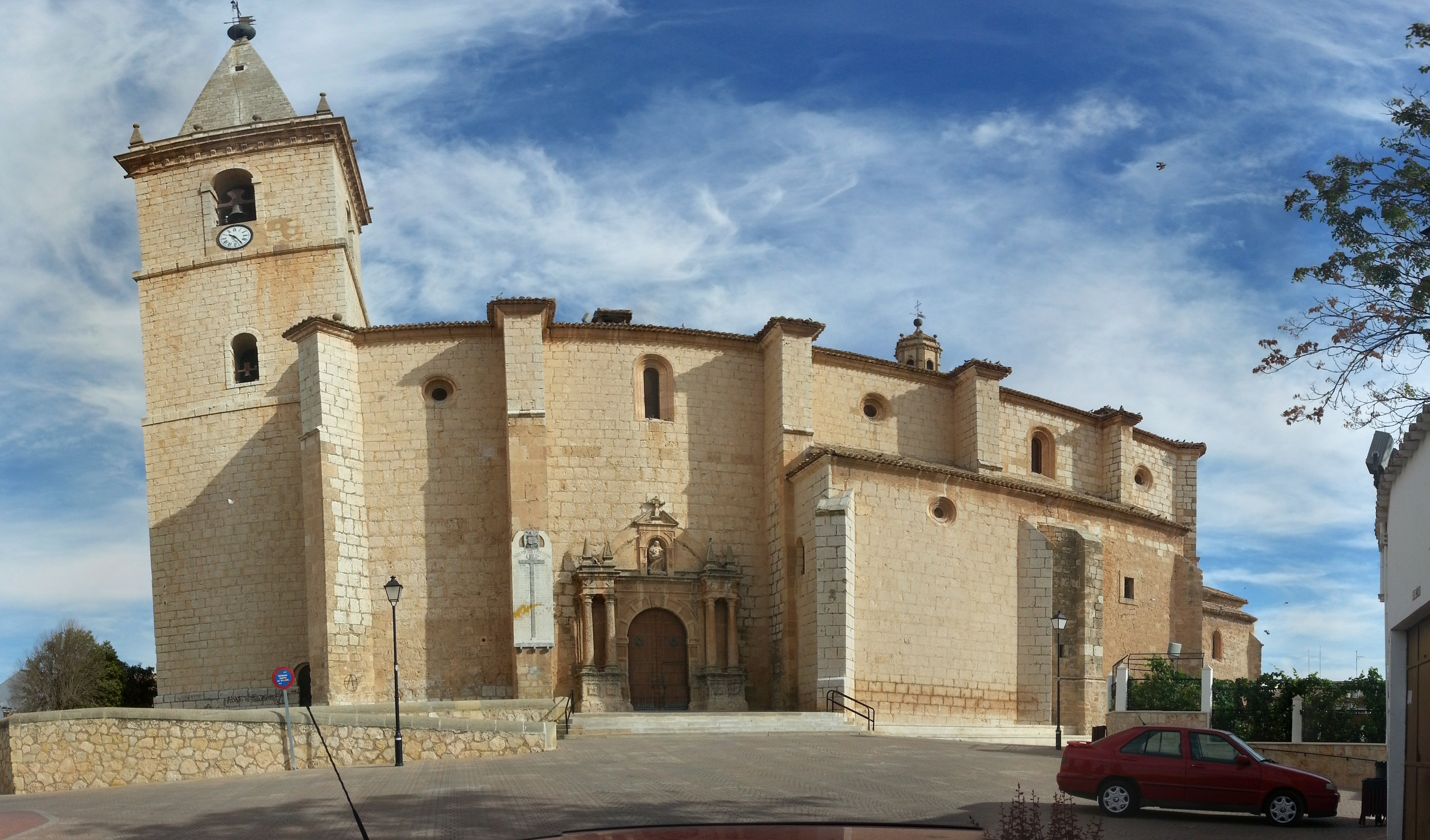
Panoramic view of the Church of El Salvador

The historic center of La Roda was declared a Conjunto histórico on May 17, 1973. The town preserves a wealth of historical and artistic heritage within its old quarter, characterized by narrow streets and squares with a distinct traditional flavor and houses adorned with coats of arms.

Key landmarks within this area include the Church of El Salvador, built in the Spanish Renaissance style on the remains of a Gothic structure; the Doña Ana wall, a prominent architectural monument in the Plateresque style, close to the High Renaissance; the House of the Inquisitor; the House of General Latorre; the Alcañabate House, a 17th-century building from the late High Renaissance, which also holds historical and sentimental value as Teresa of Ávila once stayed there; the House of Doctor La Encina, a palace with an ornate façade and coat of arms; and the House of the Countess of Villaleal, dating from the second half of the 16th century, featuring elaborate ironwork and balconies.

The architecture of the old quarter includes heraldic shields, 16th and 17th-century doorways, Gothic arches, and artistically crafted iron grilles.

== Camino de Santiago de Levante ==
La Roda is part of the Camino de Santiago routes that pass through the province of Albacete. Specifically, it is located on the Camino de Santiago de Levante, which connects the city of Valencia with Zamora, where it joins the Ruta Jacobea de la Plata. The route traverses the province of Albacete from Almansa to Minaya, also passing through the municipalities of Higueruela, Hoya-Gonzalo, Chinchilla de Monte-Aragón, Albacete, La Gineta, and La Roda.

== Gastronomy ==
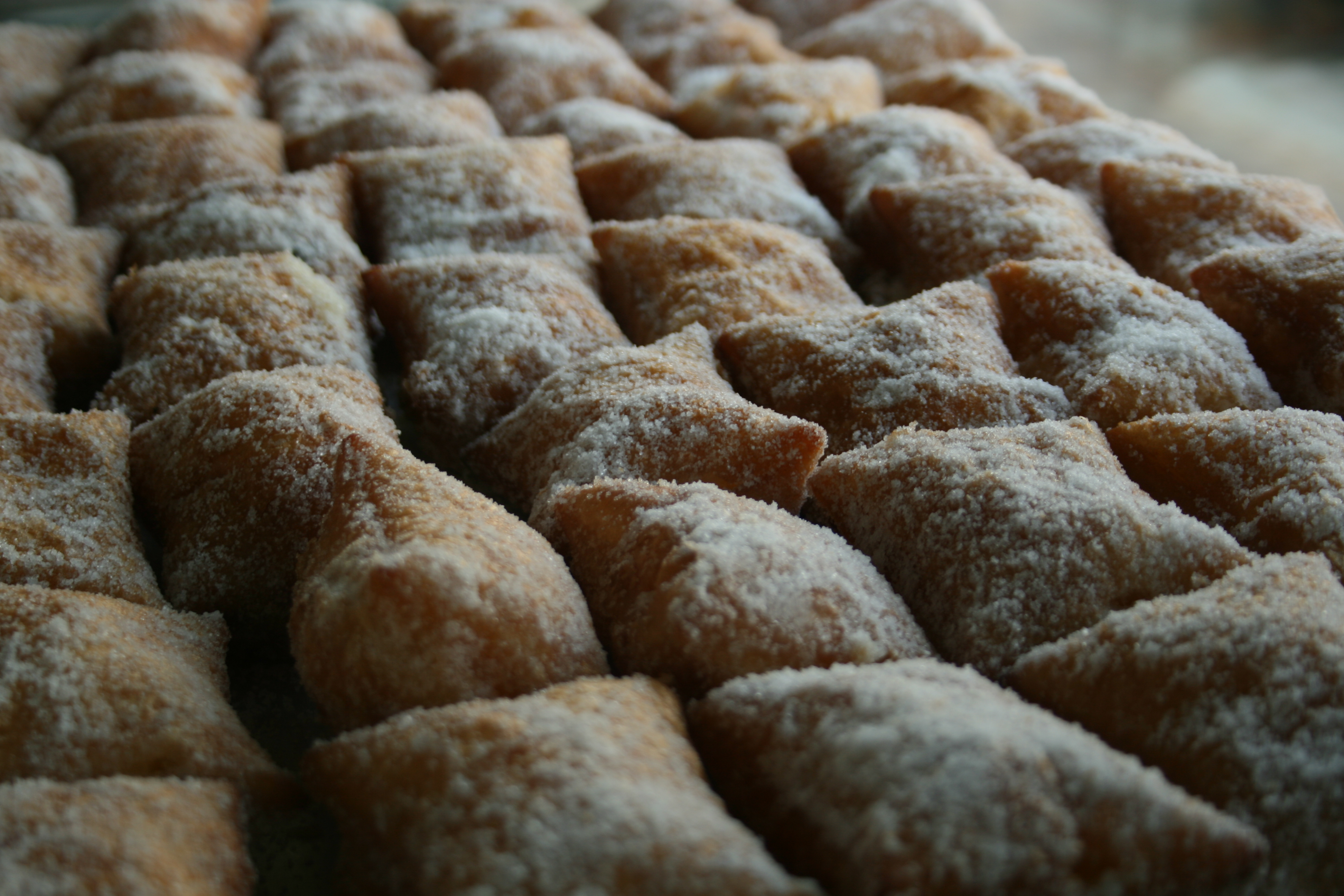
Detail of "Miguelitos" (centenarian variety).

La Roda is known for its traditional pastry, with the miguelitos being its most famous delicacy. These sweets are made with puff pastry and custard. In recent years, a chocolate version of miguelitos has emerged, though it is less popular.

Game meat features prominently in dishes such as gazpacho manchego, caldo moreno, and beans with partridge. Other hearty dishes include atascaburras, traditionally eaten on snowy days, and migas ruleras, often accompanied by grapes, chorizo, or torreznos.

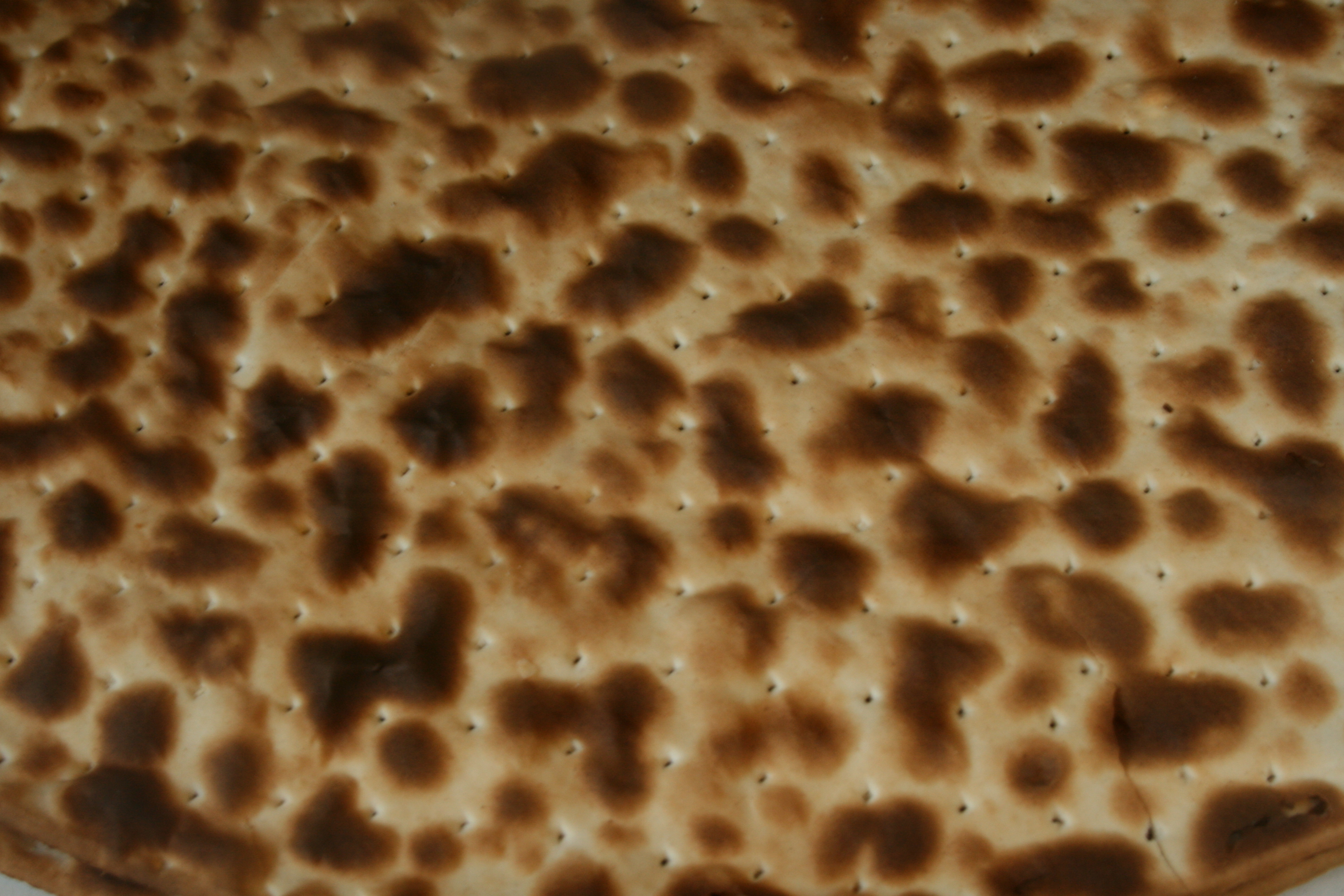
Detail of the typical torta cenceña of Albacete.

The tradition of the pig slaughter is still observed, producing sausages, black pudding, and pork loin. Typical dishes during the slaughter season include gachas de almortas or ajo mataero, followed by a sweet dessert called migas de niño.

Lighter dishes include pisto manchego and moje de pimientos, both made with peppers and tomatoes. Finally, lamb, cheeses, and wines with the Denomination of Origin La Mancha are also noteworthy.

== Festivals and events ==
- Pilgrimage of the Virgen de los Remedios. Held in mid-May, this pilgrimage involves carrying the image of the Virgin from her sanctuary in the nearby town of Fuensanta to the Church of El Salvador. Various religious services are conducted, and the image remains in the church for twenty-one days before being returned to the sanctuary in another pilgrimage in early June.
- Fiestas de El Salvador. Celebrated for nine days at the beginning of August, these are the town's main festivities, featuring a wide range of events such as a literary gala, floral battles, bullfights, dances, concerts, theater performances, folk festivals, sports competitions, and other celebrations. The associative power of these festivities is notable, as in recent years, the number of participating social clubs (peñas) has increased, reaching 78 clubs in 2010.
- Carnival, declared of Regional Tourist Interest.
- Holy Week, also declared of Regional Tourist Interest.
- Other festivities: San Antón, San Isidro, and various events in different neighborhoods in honor of their patrons.
- Festival de los Sentidos. A gastronomic and musical festival held since 2008 during the second weekend of June. In recent editions, it has attracted over 10,000 people.

== Notable inhabitants ==
Tennis player Guillermo García López hails from the city along with David Castro who is a triathlon runner.
