= Cuca =

Cuca may refer to:

== People ==
- Cuca (footballer, born 1963), former Brazilian football player, and manager
- Cuca (footballer, born 1991), Cape Verdean footballer
- Cuca (band), a Mexican rock group

== Places ==
- Cuca, Argeș, a commune in Argeș County, Romania
- Cuca, Galați, a commune in Galați County, Romania
- Cuca, another name for the upper course of the Râul Târgului in Argeș County, Romania
- Cuca, a tributary of the Bistrița in Vâlcea County, Romania
- Cucá, a community in Tixpéhual Municipality, Yucatán, Mexico

== Other ==
- Cuca (beer), an Angolan brand of beer
- Cuca Records, a former record label in Sauk City, Wisconsin, United States
- Coco (folklore) or cuca, a monster in Lusophone and Hispanophone folklore
  - Cuca (Sítio do Picapau Amarelo), fictional character
- "Cuca", a song by Detonator e as Musas do Metal from Metal Folclore: The Zoeira Never Ends...

The acronym CUCA can stand for:

- Cambridge University Conservative Association, a Conservative political society for students at Cambridge University, England
- Charlotte United Christian Academy, a private Christian school in Charlotte, North Carolina, United States

== See also ==
- Cuco (disambiguation)
- Cucueți (disambiguation)
- Cucuieți (disambiguation)
- Cuka
