= Amores =

Amores may refer to:

- Amores (Ovid), the first book by the poet Ovid, published in 5 volumes in 16 BCE
- Amores (Lucian), a play by Lucian; also known as Erotes
- Erotes (mythology), known as Amores by the Romans
- Amores, a book of poetry by D. H. Lawrence
- Amores, a piece for percussion group and prepared piano composed by John Cage
- Amores (Mexico City Metrobús), a BRT station in Mexico City
- Juan Ramón Amores García (born 1977), Spanish politician
