= Cuco =

Cuco may refer to:

- Cuco (folklore), a ghost-monster in folklore
- Cuco (musician), an American singer-songwriter
- Cuco (construction), a type of dry stone construction used in Valencia, Spain

== See also ==
- Cuca (disambiguation)
