= Catxirulos of Benaguasil =

Dry-stone farmers' refuges in Benaguasil Municipality, Spain

The “Catxirulos of Benaguasil” are small buildings made with dry stone, which served as a refuge for farmers in bad weather. They are usually small constructions. The floor areas range from 3.5 m^{2} to 35 m^{2}. Catxirulos are built of stone without mortar or cement, although some are reinforced with these materials. Most were built by the owners, using local materials.

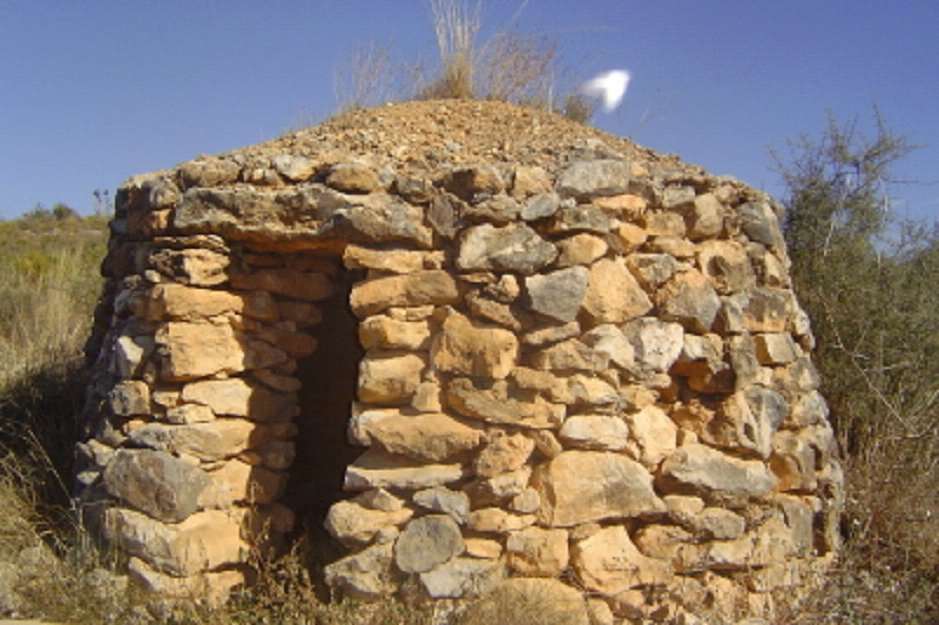
Arrué's Catxirulo, 1910 Source:Town hall of Benaguasil

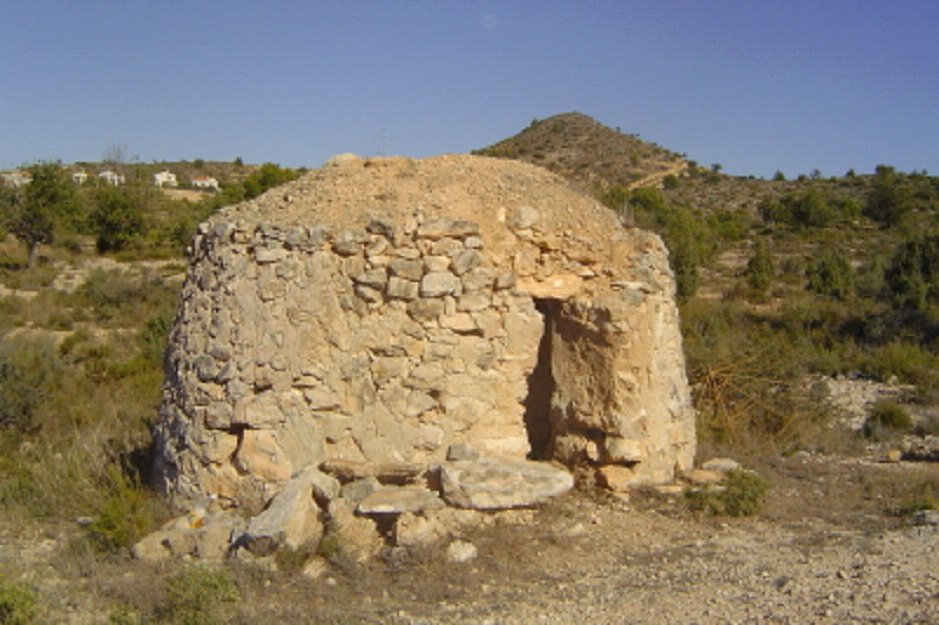
Typical Benaguasil's catxirulo Source:Town hall of Benaguasil

== Etymology ==
The word “cachirulo” or “catxirulo”, in Benaguasil, only has the meaning of dry stone rustic retreat, usually covered with a false vault; this meaning is shared with other localities.

However, in Valencian, the general meaning of the word is comet or star.

In Spanish, it also means: a container for liquor; a small boat with three masts; or ornaments with feathers and ribbons that women wore on their heads at the end of 18th century. In Aragonese it means a head scarf.

The first documentation in Valencian is by José Escrig y Martínez, contained in the dictionary “Valenciano-Castellano” of 1851, where it says “Cagerul, Cagerulo, Cachirulo”: small boat with three sails.

In Valencian it is also often applied to the “Barracas” or rustic rooms topped with a cone, and similar objects.

== Geographical extension ==
The term is only used in areas that were formerly used for rain-fed crops such as carob, olive or vines. It is not used in any areas of irrigated orchards. It is found in the “partidas” of “Les Travesses, Els Cremats, Els Cabeços, La Cañada de Amorós, La Cañada de Mareta, El Pla de Lucas and El Pla de Paterna”.

== Construction technique ==
The catxirulo is made completely with dry stone, without ornaments. It is built in round, square and rectangular plans, not exceeding 1.5 meters in height and finished with a conical dome.

The round form is the oldest; it facilitates the starting point of the dome. With square or rectangular plans, the internal shape matches up with the external.

The door was always away from the north and west. It is usually a simple lintel, a flat stone resting on pillars. Others have a two-segment arch, two inclined lintels at an angle on the side pillar, “in the barraca” as they say in Benaguasil. Also found are arches with elongated stones positioned radially.

=== Interior works ===
Inside of the catxirulo we can find constructed several elements.

- Niches: empty space between four flat stones, like small cabinets set into the wall.
- Viewpoints: openings through the walls to look out.
- Vents: holes through the wall, which may be made with the same technique as the niche, or by placing a trunk perpendicularly to the wall; after building the wall, the trunk is removed, leaving a round hole.
- Mangers: for feeding large animals.
- Stone benches.
- Grippers: Niches that are crossed with a stick or a simple stake with an elbow. These served to tie the animals.

=== The roof ===
A false dome was built using circular rows of successively smaller diameter.

== Former cachirulos ==
According to plans dated 1928:

- Catxirulo I. Partida the Cremats, polygon 32, plot 45
- Catxirulo of Cisqui. Partida the Cremats, polygon 32, plot 39
- Catxirulo III. Partida the Cremats, polygon 34, plot 40
- Catxirulo IV. Partida the Cremats, polygon 34, plot 43
- Catxirulo V. Partida the Cremats, polygon 26, plot 3
- Catxirulo of Topairet. Partida the Topairet, polygon 8, plot 41
- Catxirulo VII. Partida Pla of Paterna, polygon 23, plot 184
- Catxirulo VIII. Partida Cañada de Amorós, polygon 6, plot 47
- Catxirulo IX. Partida the Cabeços, polygon 23, plot 102
- Catxirulo X. Partida the Cabeços, polygon 23, plot 247
- Catxirulo XI. Partida the Cabeços, polígon 26, parcela 59

== Extant cachirulos ==
- Catxirulo de Pistola or of the Ermita. It was built between 1936 and 1939 by “Manu” and the Alonso's brothers, “els Pistoletes”. It is a circular floor “cachirulo” included in a diverse set of dry stone works: margins, fences and walls. Relaxation and genetic experimentation seed rainfed. State of partial ruin.
- Catxirulo of Campos or of Ramada. Prior to 1928 circular and good condition. The stone lintel of the door has disappeared and has been replaced with a strip of wood. It is coated with plaster inside and partially outside. It lacks the key back and a wall has loose stones.
- Catxirulo of Arrué. It was built about 1910 by Pere Arrué-Vincent (1862-1944), farmer and mason Benaguasil. Is circular in plan and is in good condition. The only niche that you must be a fire. It's dry stone no boost or lucid.
- Catxirulo of Gepito or of Escamilla. Post-1928 and a circular layout. It is in good condition. It is reinforced with plaster on the outside and they have added an iron gate. The outer wall ending in a single auction.
- Catxirulo of the Lois or the Sanxis. Prior to 1928, is circular and is in imminent ruin. It is semi buried by the last movement of land held in the back half of the factory next door.
- Catxirulo of Herràeza or of Ros. Prior to 1905, documented in 1905 as cachirulo Ros. It is in partial ruin. The roof collapsed after 1928 and are currently the four walls, the lintel of the door and part of the wall. The plant is square, but it has the Angle rounded.
- Catxirulo of Fèlix or of Vivó. Previous to 1928. The plan is rectangular with rounded corners and the dome is elliptical. Is perfectly integrated in a wide marjada makes wall. The door has a short lintel supported with modillones. It is one of the best preserved and the term art.
- Catxirulo of Calmeta or of Vicent el Huitavo. Prior to 1928, square and in good condition. The dome is closed with three keys elliptical or flat slabs. The outer wall is topped with perfection. It handles a manager with five vents in the walls.
- Catxirulo of Andreuet. Prior to 1905, circular and well preserved. The stone dome tip ends and the walls have a continuous auction. It has a large woodshed, a respirator and converted into a niche window. He incorporated a reinforced concrete door.
- Catxirulo of Valls or of Rosquilla the espigador. Is later than 1928, circular plant and is in partial ruin.
- Catxirulo of Belloc. Prior to 1928, circular and well preserved. It has a double curvature and dome inside is worn with cement. It has added new construction extending access to the entrance.
- Catxirulo of Ramada or of Rafel the Bugarrenyo. Prior to 1928, rectangular and in good condition. The dome is topped by a roof covered with tiles. It is worn inside and out and reinforced with plaster.
- Catxirulo of Vivó or of Mílio el Tarongero. Post-1928, circular and in good condition. The back part is attached to a marjada, and have placed a door and have whitewashed.
- Catxirulo of Capella. Prior to 1928, circular and in good condition. Lucida and reinforced concrete, has a niche of 60x40 cm. It has added a door and 2 windows have been opened from the original niches.
- Catxirulo of Xoro or of Ibáñez de Parra. It was built around 1920 by "Manu", is circular in plan and is in good condition. It is the largest Benaguasil. It is attached to a house forming a dependency. The door was originally an arch and currently has a wooden door. The outer wall has scored as cornice made of flat stones.
- Catxirulo the Mut of Xapa. Prior to 1928, circular and well preserved. The ottoman is short lintel, and has about a built-in margin woodshed.
- Catxirulo of Linares or of Isabel Ibáñez. Prior to 1928, rectangular and well preserved. It consists in a marjada sheltering.
- Catxirulo of Balaguer or of Rafel Cabeça/Batiste the Catrullo. Post-1928, circular and in good condition. It has a bench at the edge of the door, is worn inside and outside reinforced. It has a detached house.
- Catxirulo of Quitèrio. Prior to 1928, circular and well preserved. The door has a short lintel is reinforced with plaster and wood has a space as large as the cachirulo own.
- Catxirulo of Palmira or of Ferrandis. Prior to 1900, rectangular and in a state of impending doom. It is partially carved sedimentary rock. The roof is formed by large flat slabs, has carved a niche in the rock and another unfinished.
- Catxirulo of Sampa. By 1900, circular and in good condition. It has two doors and inside has two semicircular benches going door to door. No opening or niche. The doors are arches.
- Catxirulo of Llosà. It was built around 1960 by Claudio Llosa, is circular and in good condition. It is reinforced with cement and lucid. It is a hybrid between cachirulo and shed hunter. The roof is not made of stone and is flat. It has no window or niche.
- Catxirulo of Núgol or of guardes. After 1928. It was built by Batiste Cervera "the Polit" his teacher "Cardoneta". It is circular and in partial ruin. It was a guard booth. It has four strategic viewpoints, currently lacks the key vault.
- Catxirulo of the Llometa de Rafel or the guarda/of the Retorta. By 1950, square and only the remains. The ceiling and upper walls are destroyed, was a guard house.

== See also ==
- Cuco
- Bothy
- Barraca de vinya (Catalan language)
- Casup (Catalan language)
- Maset (Catalan language)
- Trullo
- Cabana de volta (Catalan language)
- Catxirulo (Catalan language)

== Bibliography ==
- Cervera Rodríguez, J. L., Galiana Bondia, J. V. i Dominguez Bell-lloch, J. "Els catxirulos de Benaguasil. Una artesania de pedra en sec". Ajuntament de Benaguasil, 2005 ISBN 978-84-689-3652-9
- García Lisón, M., i Zaragozá Catalán, A. "Arquitectura rural primitiva en secà". Temes d'Etnografia Valenciana. Volum 1. València, Institut Alfons el Magnànim, 1983 CS 418-2000 Oficina Depósito Legal Castellón
- Seijo Alonso, F. G. Arquitectura rústica en la región valenciana. Ed. Villa. Alacant, 1979 A 149-1979 Oficina Depósito Legal Alicante
