= Cucueți =

Cucueţi may refer to several villages in Romania:

- Cucueţi, a village in Verguleasa Commune, Olt County
- Cucueţi, a village in Scrioaștea Commune, Teleorman County

== See also ==
- Cucuieţi (disambiguation)
- Cuca (disambiguation)
