= Church of El Salvador o de la Transfiguración =

- Iglesia de El Salvador o de la Transfiguración (Spanish)
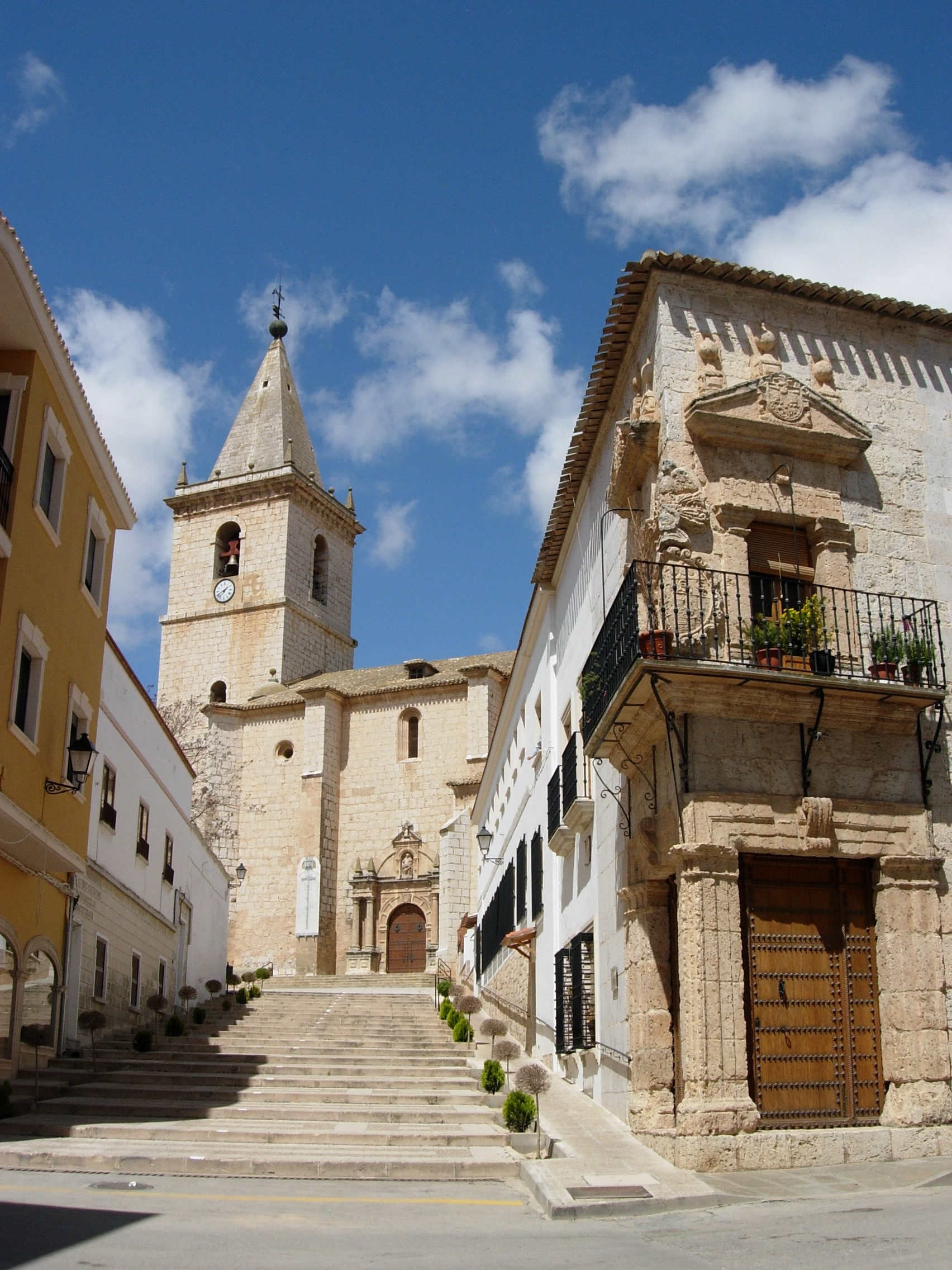

- Location within Spain
- 39.207442°N 2.159249°W
- Location: La Roda, Spain

Spanish Cultural Heritage
- Official name: Iglesia de El Salvador o de la Transfiguración
- Type: Non-movable
- Criteria: Monument
- Designated: 1981
- Reference no.: RI-51-0004481

The Church of El Salvador o de la Transfiguración (Spanish: Iglesia de El Salvador o de la Transfiguración) is a church that is situated in La Roda, Spain. In 1981 it was declared Bien de Interés Cultural.

The church was constructed mostly using the Renaissance-style commencing circa 1520, and continuing until 1569, when the bell-tower was completed. A line that shines throughout the year is found at the top of the tower and is locally known as the " 'Luz del Salvador'. It is thought that the castle of Robda (destroyed during 1476–1478) was previously located on the site. The church architects were the brothers Pedro and Juan de Alviz.

The interior has an Adoration of the Magi by Luca Giordano. The sacristy has wood carvings attributed to Berruguete.

The town holds an annual festival during which an image of the Savior is carried through the streets of the town.
