= Miguelitos =

Puff pastry dessert from Spain

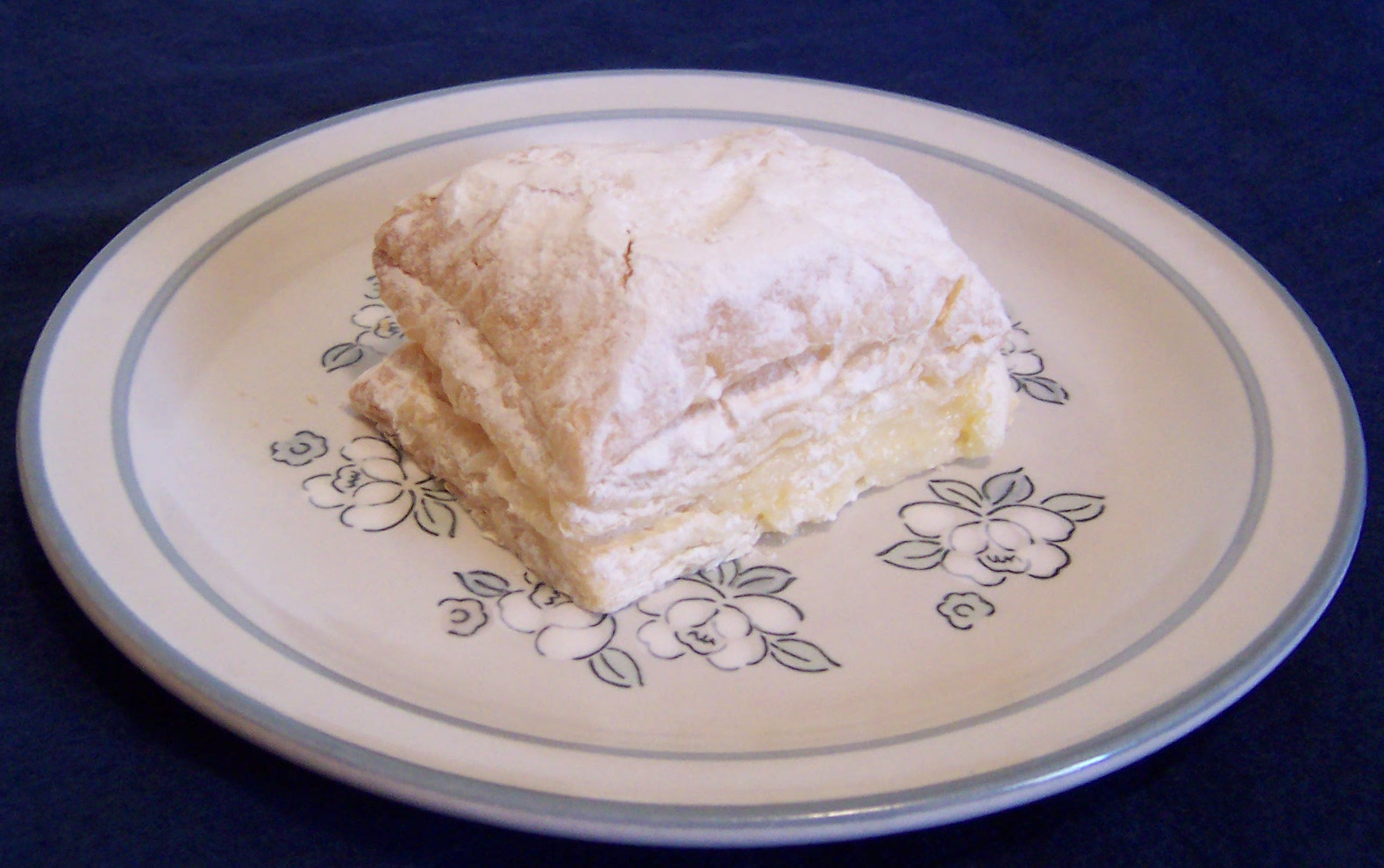
- Type: Dessert, Snack
- Place of origin: Spain
- Region or state: Castilla–La Mancha
- Main ingredients: Puff pastry, Custard

Miguelitos are a type of cream-filled puff pastry dessert. They originated in La Roda, in Castilla–La Mancha, Spain: Manuel Blanco, the creator of these flaky desserts, was born in La Roda in 1925. After being a part of the military in 1960 he migrated to Pamplona where the pastry was created. The name Miguelito came after he decided to give his friend Miguel the first bite of his creation; from there the name stuck. La Roda de Albacete started to be known with various pastry chefs throughout Spain, causing the expansion of the dessert.

== Description ==
Miguelitos are a simple traditional cake consisting of soft puff pastry with a creamy custard-like filling, with a flaky cake-like crust covered with sugar powder. They can be filled with milk, dark, and white chocolate along with the original cream. The dessert can be served hot or cold. Sizes tend to vary based on the chefs preference. In Castilla–La Mancha, Miguelitos, have also been known to be served with a cup of café con leche.

== Recipe ==
Miguelitos can be made in many different ways, tending to be more of a personal preference.

== See also ==
- List of custard desserts
- List of pastries
