= Cuco (construction) =

Type of dry stone construction

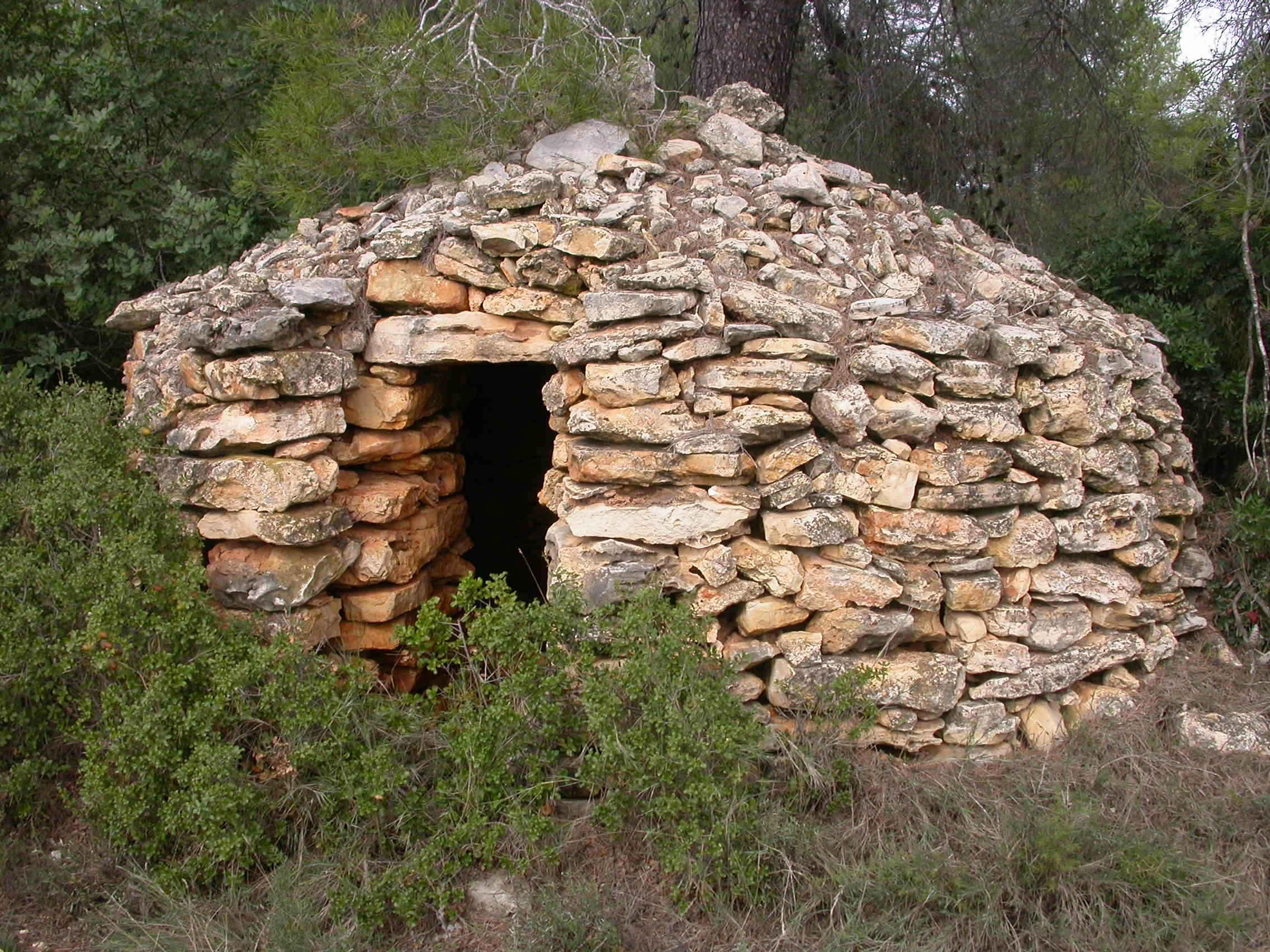
Cuco. Built with dry-masonry technique, Enguera (Valencia · España).

The cuco is a type of construction made with the dry stone technique, in Valencia.

Within the Valencian autonomous community (Comunidad Valenciana) they are located geographically in the regions of the valley of Ayora–Cofrentes, La Costera and La Canal de Navarrés. The latter concentrates the greatest number of these constructions, highlighting quantitatively the entire municipality of Enguera.

They use the raw materials found in their environment, rarely used manufactured materials. Two types of stone are used, the limestone that is used in the body of the construction, the one that holds the cover and the cover stone (tap: white marls), lighter, on the deck.

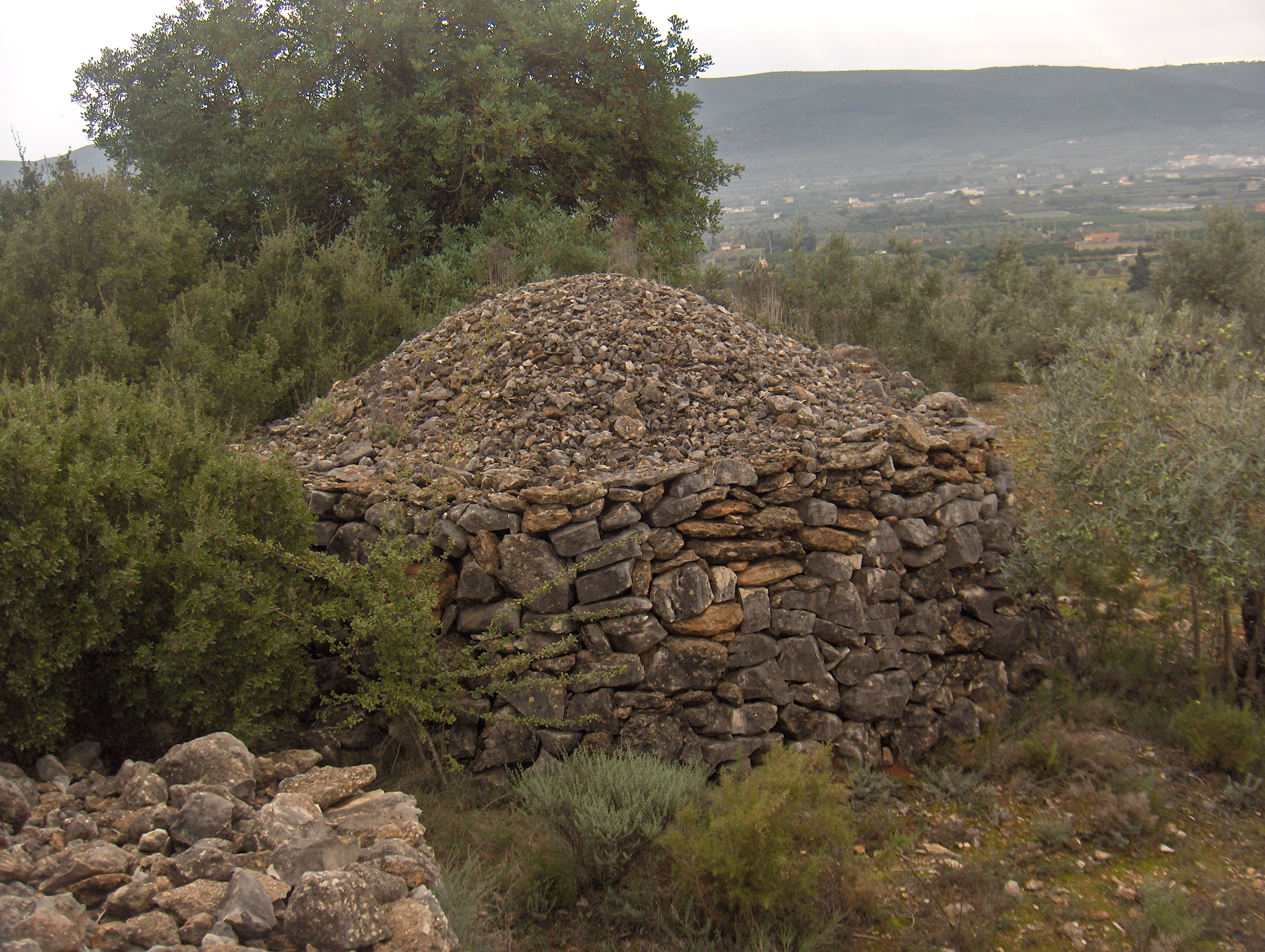
Cuco. Detail of the wall on which the roof rests. Enguera (Valencia).

== Typology ==
The typology of the constructions is very varied. Round-plan constructions predominate, although those of quadrangular plan are frequent. In occasion the cuco adapts to the relief of the land and adopts an irregular plan.

The covering systems are all the same. A false dome is built by approaching courses.

The covering of the access spans is made with large slabs as a lintel. Other typologies are documented as two slabs supported on both sides of the span, the approach of courses or the adovelado (with dovelas) arch (built with irregular slabs arranged radially).

Inside the cucos complementary structures are found: fireplace, cupboard, manger, etc.

They are usually free buildings, although sometimes they are attached to the roadways (terraces); or they can have a quadrangular annex space.

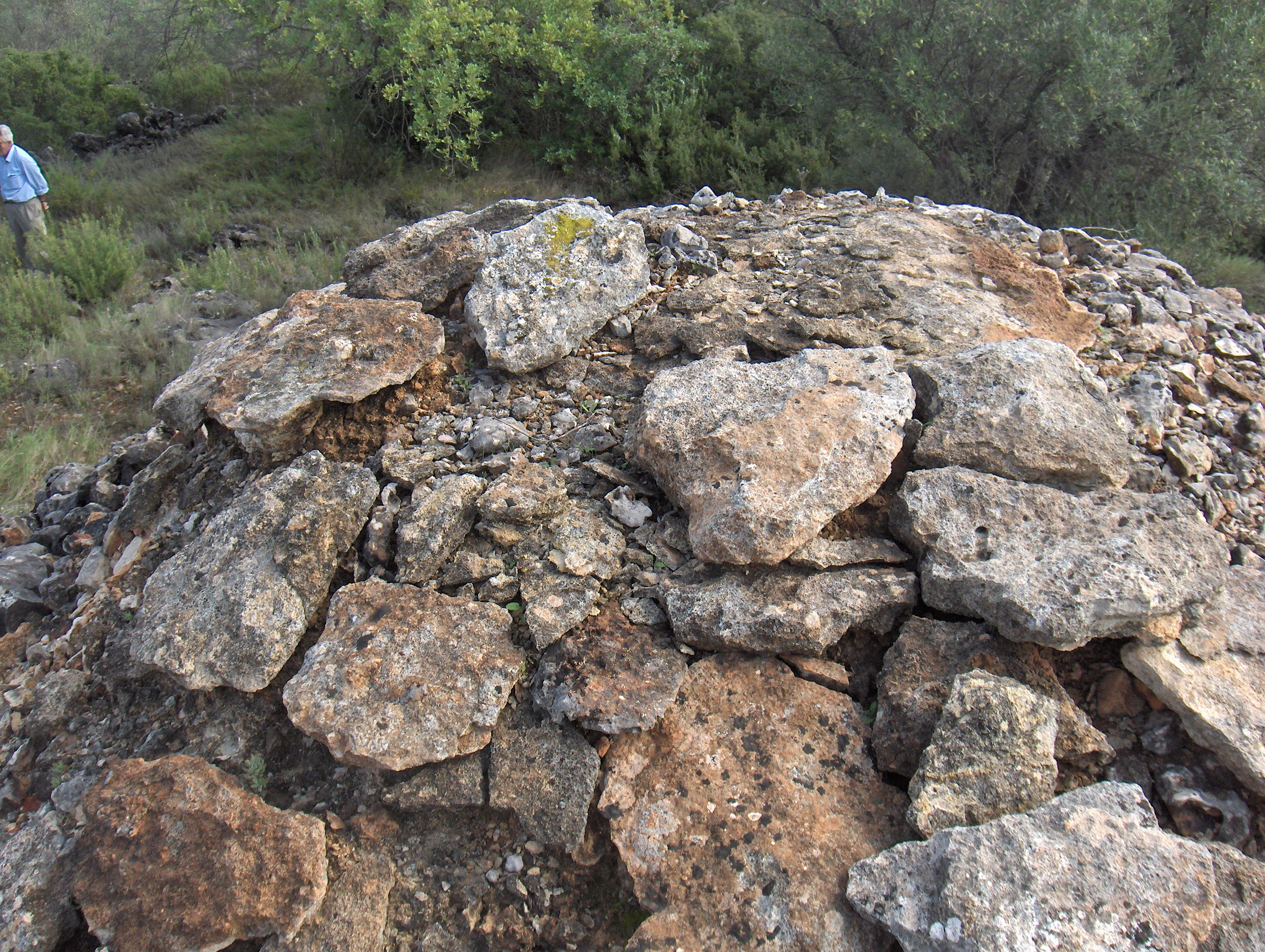
Cuco. Detail of the outer area of the roof, showing the different layers that compose it. Enguera (Valencia).

== Functionality ==
They are constructions destined to the refuge and temporary stays of the agriculturists. Its occupation used to be seasonal, coinciding with the moments of greater work in the agricultural parcels. Its use is different from that in other areas of the Valencian Community where it is linked to livestock.

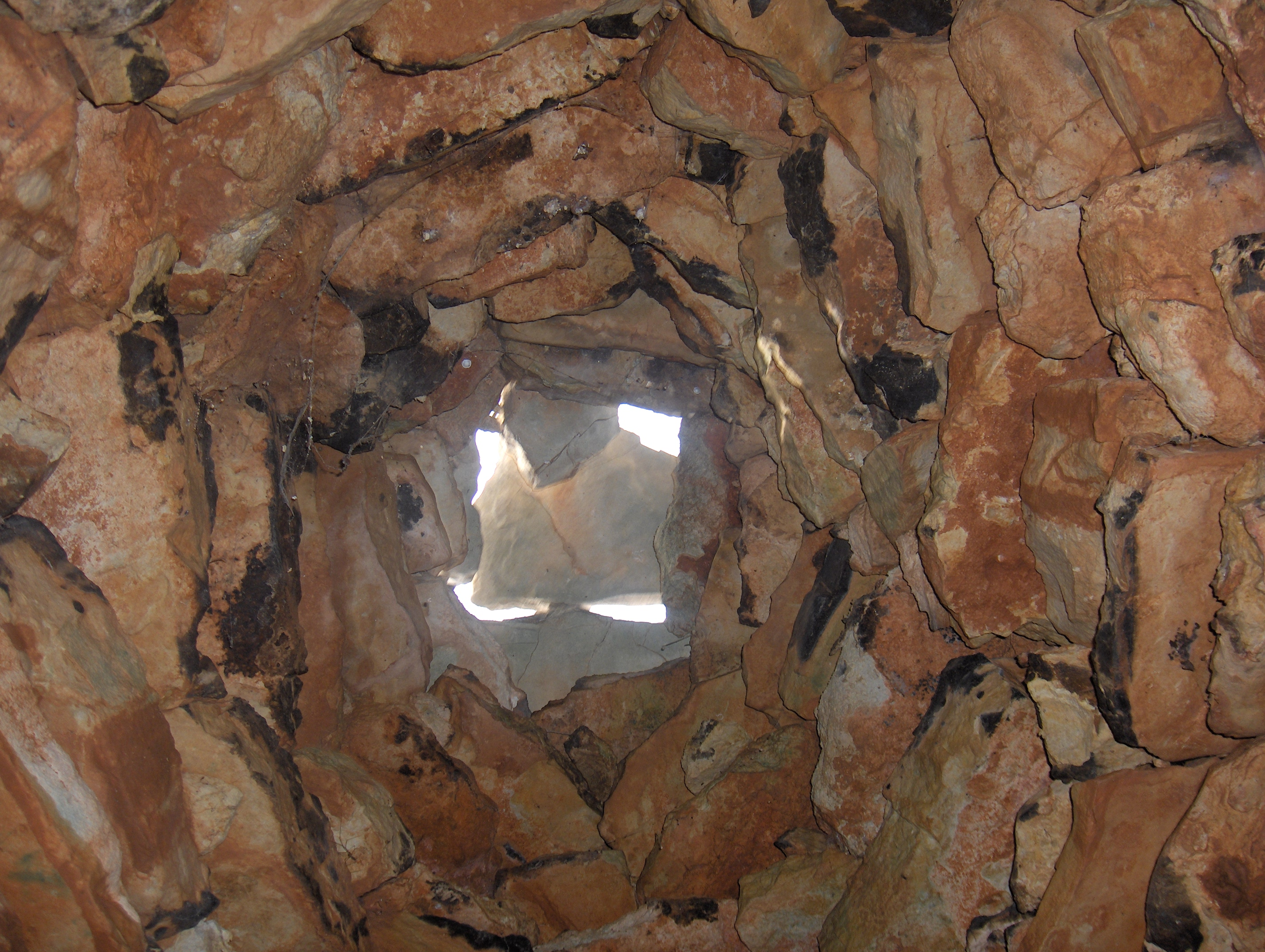
Cuco. Detail of the false dome by approach of courses. Enguera (Valencia).

== See also ==
- cucos (es:), Mancha albaceteña construction (Mancha Alta Albaceteña), Castilla-La Mancha (España)
- Types of buildings

== Bibliography ==
- Darder Pericas, B. (1929): La estructura geológica de los Valles de Montesa y Enguera (Prov. de Valencia). En : Memorias de la Real Sociedad Española de Historia Natural, T. XV (2); p. 603 - 610.
- García Aparicio, M y Castellano Castillo, J. J. (1993): Plan de recuperación de las construcciones rurales en la sierra de Enguera. Un modelo de actuación. Zahora Nº 38, pp. 223-254.
- Castellano Castillo, J. J. (2001): Los Cucos de la Sierra de Enguera. Ayuntamiento de Enguera; 130 págs. ISBN 84-923637-2-X
