= Cucuieți =

Cucuieți may refer to several places in Romania:

- Cucuieți, a village in Dofteana Commune, Bacău County
- Cucuieți, a village in Solonț Commune, Bacău County
- Cucuieți, a village in Plătărești Commune, Călărași County
- Cucuieți (Tazlău), a tributary of the Tazlău in Bacău County
- Cucuieți, a tributary of the Trotuș in Bacău County

and to:

- Cucuieții Noi and Cucuieții Vechi, villages in Alexăndrești Commune, Rîșcani district, Moldova

== See also ==
- Cucueți (disambiguation)
- Cuca (disambiguation)
