= Juan Ramón Amores García =

Spanish politician (born 1977)

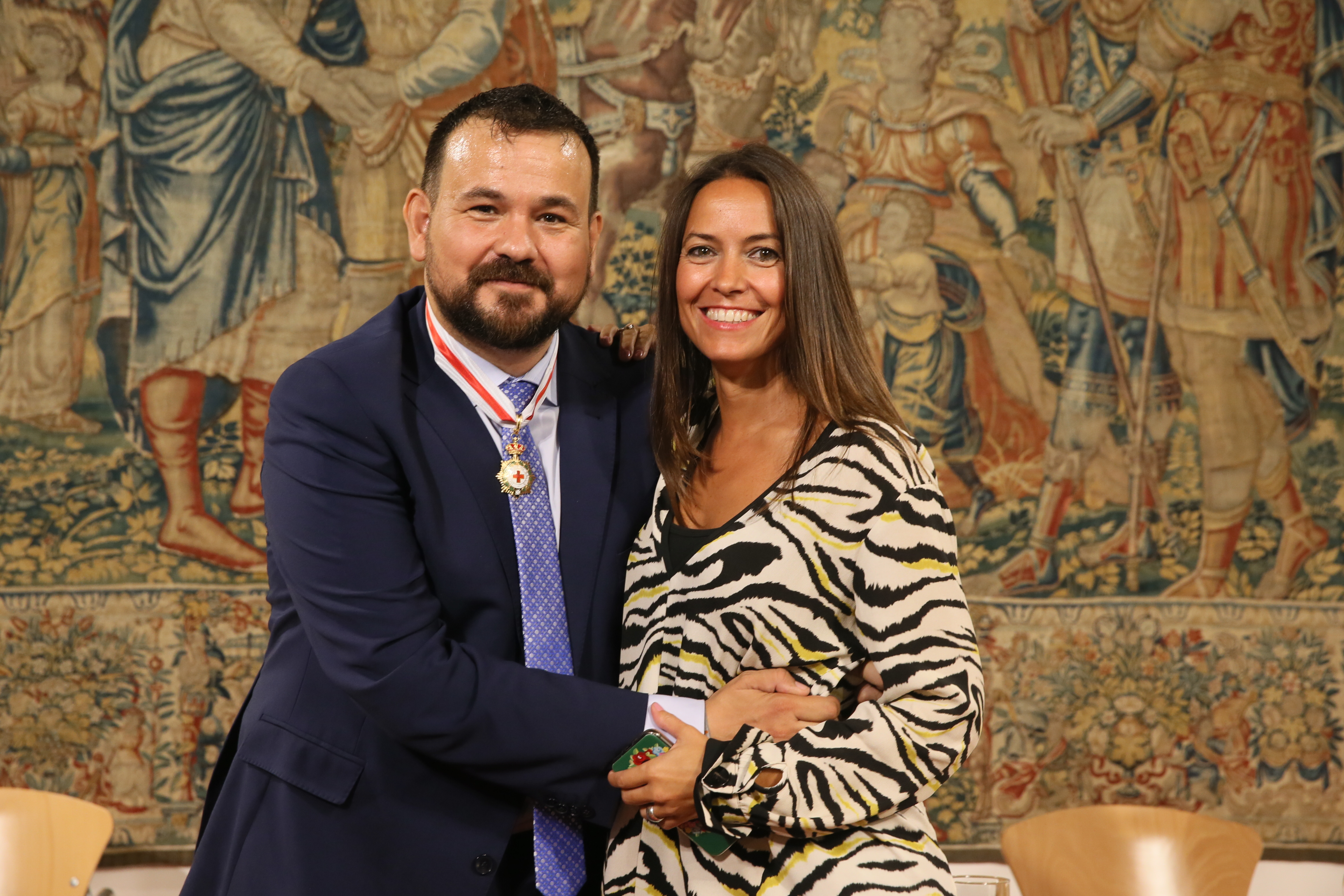
- Zamora in 2015

Member of the Senate
- Incumbent
- Assumed office 1 September 2023
- Appointed by: Cortes of Castilla–La Mancha

Personal details
- Born: 5 April 1977 (age 49)
- Party: Spanish Socialist Workers' Party

Juan Ramón Amores García (born 5 April 1977) is a Spanish politician serving as a member of the Senate since 2023. He has served as mayor of La Roda since 2019.
