= Tixpéhual Municipality =

Municipality in the Mexican state of Yucatán

Tixpéhual
- Municipality
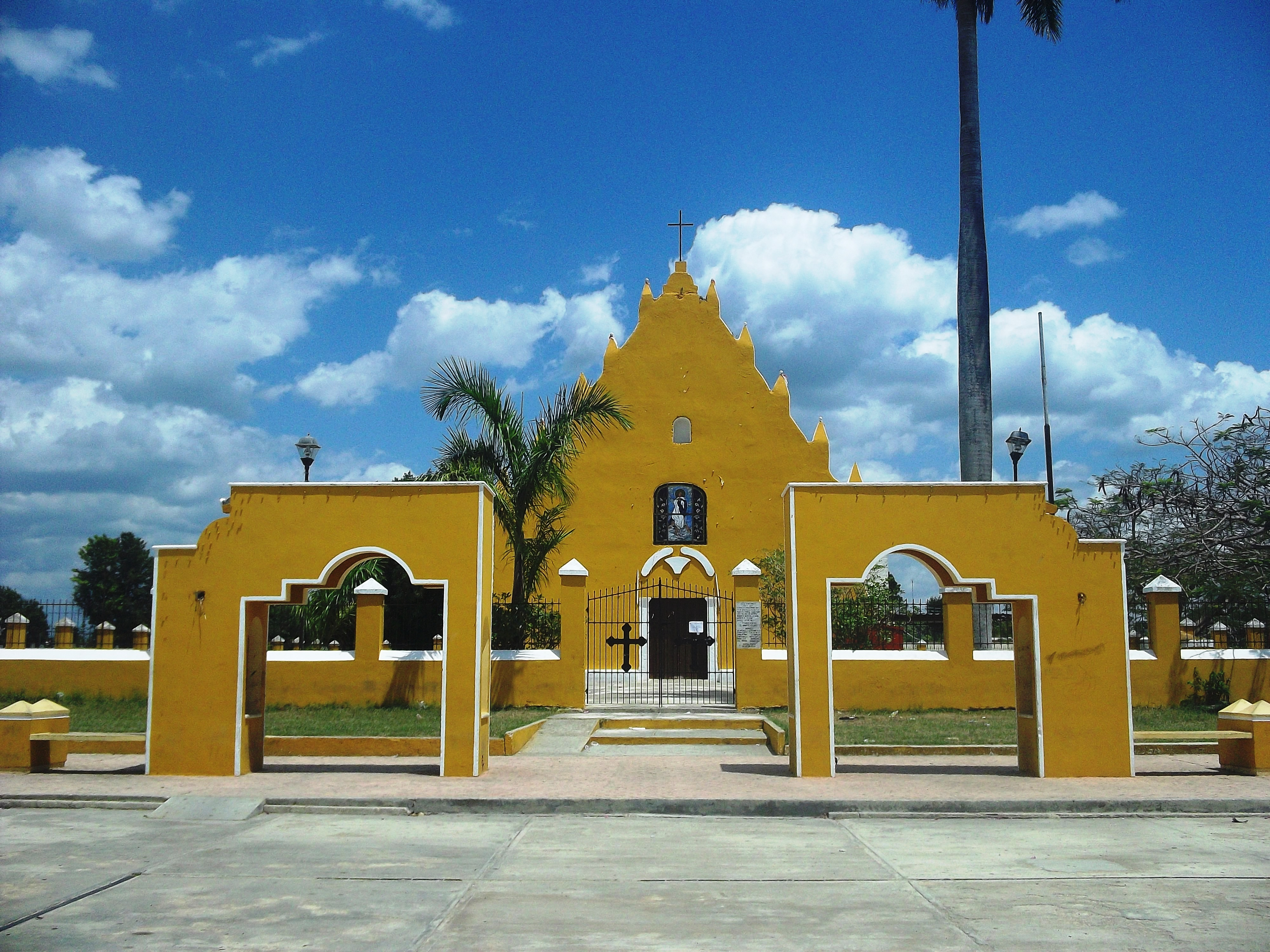
- Church at Tixpéhual, Yucatán

- Region 2 Noroeste #095

- Location of the Municipality in Mexico
- Coordinates: 20°58′40″N 89°26′30″W
- Country: Mexico
- State: Yucatán

Government
  - Type: 2012–2015
  - Municipal President: José Ángel Ismael Mex Salas

Area
  - Total: 68.98 km^{2} (26.63 sq mi)
- Elevation: 8 m (26 ft)

Population (2010)
  - Total: 5,388
- Time zone: UTC-6 (Central Standard Time)
- INEGI Code: 009
- Major Airport: Merida (Manuel Crescencio Rejón) International Airport
- IATA Code: MID
- ICAO Code: MMMD

Tixpéhual Municipality (Spanish pronunciation: [tiʃˈpe.wal], in the Yucatec Maya language: “place of the dwarf's greeting”) is a municipality in the Mexican state of Yucatán containing 68.98 km^{2} of land and located roughly 25 km east of the city of Mérida, Mexico.

== History ==
In ancient times, the area was part of the chieftainship of Ceh Pech until the conquest. At colonization, Tixpéhual became part of the encomienda system, which was implemented in 1607.

In 1821, Yucatán was declared independent of the Spanish Crown. In 1825 the area was part of the Coastal region, with its headquarters in Izamal Municipality. In 1847, during the Caste War of Yucatán the native headman was taken to prison and tortured after being suspected of collaboration with the insurgency against the Spanish.

In 1929, Tixpéhual was part of the Tixkokob Municipality.

== Governance ==
The municipal president is elected for a three- year term. The president appoints four Councilpersons to serve on the board for three year terms, as the Secretary and councilors of public works, nomenclature, ecology, and markets and roads.

== Communities ==
The head of the municipality is Tixpéhual, Yucatán. Other populated communities Chochóh, Cucá, Kiilinché, Los Flamboyanes, Sahé and Techóh. The largest populated areas are shown below:

Community	Population
Entire Municipality (2010)	5,388
Chochóh	530 in 2005
Cucá	114 in 2005
Kiilinché	244 in 2005
Sahé	114 in 2005
Tixpéhual	3312 in 2005

== Local festivals ==
Every year from the 17 to 20 December a fair is held.

== Tourist attractions ==
- Church of San Martín
- Hacienda Chochóh
- Hacienda Sahé
- Hacienda Techoh
