= Cuca (beer) =

Angolan beer brand

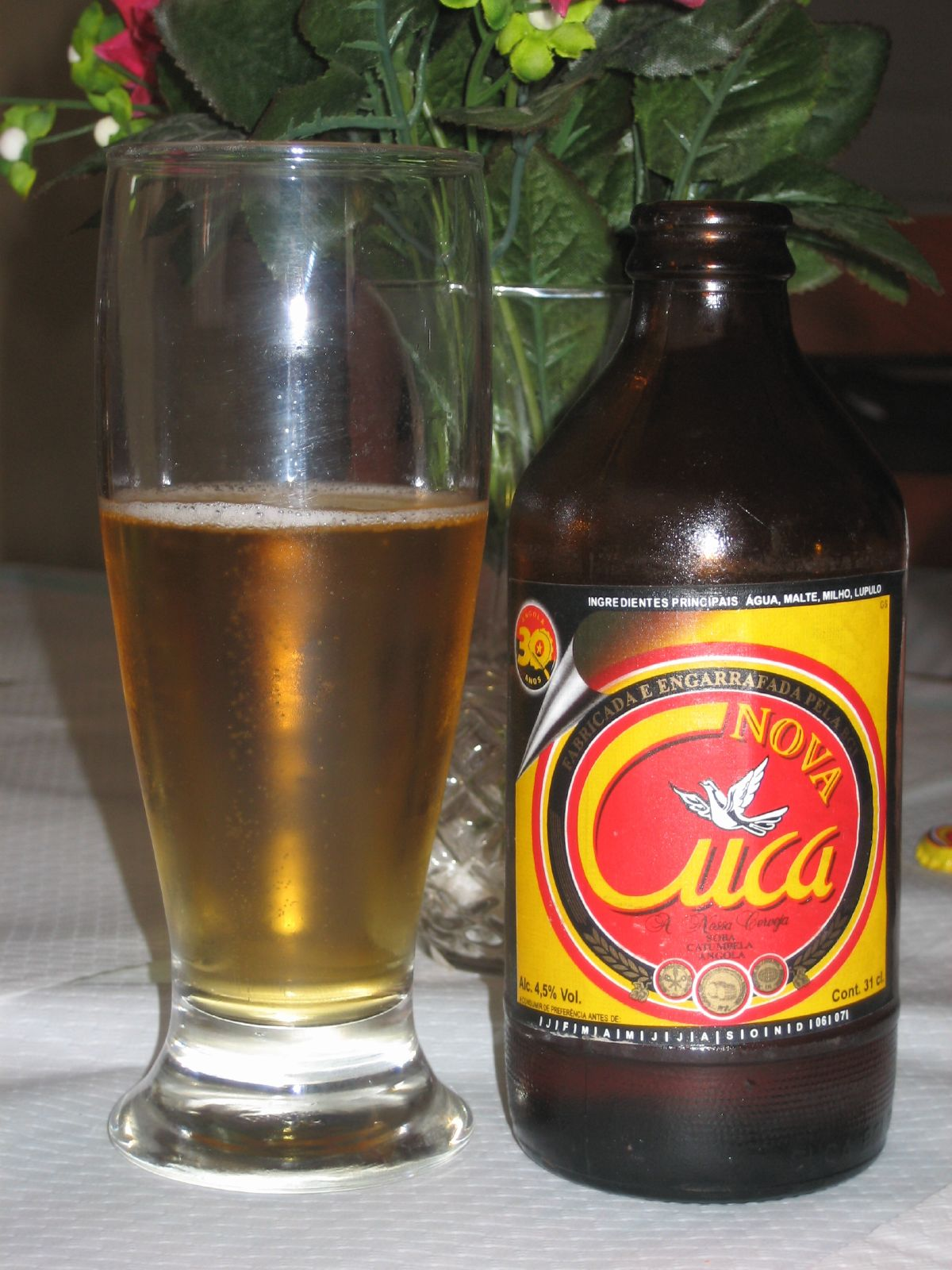
- Type: Pale lager
- Manufacturer: Companhia União de Cervejas de Angola
- Country of origin: Angola
- Introduced: 1947
- Alcohol by volume: 4.5%

Cuca (also called Cuca BGI) is a brand of beer manufactured by Companhia União de Cervejas de Angola ("United Beer Company of Angola") in Angola.

== History ==
Cuca beer was established in 1947, while Angola was still an overseas territory of Portugal, under the name CUCA - Companhia União de Cervejas de Angola, SARL, with a capital of 5,000 contos, being a daughter company of the Portuguese Central de Cervejas.

Already after the independence of Angola, on May 26, 1976, the Government confiscated and nationalized Cuca, after taking possession of the Commission for Restructuring the brewing industry.

Cuca is now owned by the French Castel Group. It is manufactured in Luanda and in Catumbela, in the municipality of Lobito, Benguela province. The Benguela production amounts to 60 000 bars per day.

== Foreign exports ==
Besides Angola, Cuca beer is also sold in Portugal, Mozambique, United States, Namibia, Democratic Republic of Congo and Zambia.

=== In Namibia ===
In Namibia, Cuca beer was illegal from the mid-1970s to the 1980s, yet it was widely available in the northern parts of the country, in Ovamboland and Kavango. Bars there became known as "Cuca shops". Around the time of Namibian independence, the Democratic Turnhalle Alliance was said to have offered free beer in Cuca shops, in an attempt to lure voters to its side.

== See also ==
- Beer
- Alcoholic beverage
