= Mancha Alta Albaceteña =

Mancha Alta Albaceteña is a comarca of the Province of Albacete, Spain.
