= List of recipients of the Creus de Sant Jordi =

Creu de Sant Jordi

List of people and institutions rewarded with the Creu de Sant Jordi Award, the second-highest civil distinction awarded in Catalonia (Spain).

== 1980s ==
=== 1981 ===
(1981, although granted in early 1982)

- People: Lola Anglada i Sarriera, Ramon Aramon i Serra, Enric Bagué i Garriga, Agustí Bartra i Lleonart, Antoni Bergós i Massó, Moisès Broggi, Josep Maria de Casacuberta i Roger, Antoni Cumella i Serret, Ramon Faus i Esteve, Tomàs Garcés i Miravet, Eusebi Güell i Jover, Lluís Llach i Grande, Josep Mainar i Pons, Marià Manent i Cisa, Victorià Muñoz i Oms, Raimon Noguera i de Guzman, Josep Riba i Ortínez, Lluís Solé i Sabarís, Joan Triadú i Font.

=== 1982 ===
- People: Joan Ainaud i de Lasarte, Andreu Alfaro i Hernàndez, Josep Alsina i Bofill, Miquel Batllori i Munné, Manuel Blancafort i de Rosselló, Lluís Bonet i Garí, Emili Brugalla i Turmo, Pere Calders i Rossinyol, Joan Camprubí i Alemany (Joan Capri), Maria Aurèlia Capmany i Farnés, Lluís Carulla i Canals, Modest Cuixart i Tàpies, Pere Duran i Farell, Francesc Farreras i Duran, Maria Àngels Ferrer i Sensat, Josep Maria Flotats i Picas, Antoni Forrellad i Solà, Pere Grases i Gonzàlez, Josep Gudiol i Ricart, Pedro Laín Entralgo, Rosa Leveroni i Valls, Josep Lladonosa i Pujol, Josep Maria Llompart i de la Penya, José Luis López Aranguren, Frederic Marès i Deulovol, Joan Merli i Pahissa, Lluís Maria Millet i Millet, Domènec Moliné i Nicola, Albert Pérez i Baró, Josep Maria Pi i Sunyer, Josep Pont i Gol, Joan Sales i Vallès, Martí Salvans i Puig, Joan Sardà i Dexeus, Josep Maria Subirachs i Sitjar, Ramon Sugranyes i de Franch, Miquel Tarradell i Mateu, Lluís Terricabres i Molera, Arthur Hubert Terry, Antonio Tovar Llorente, Josep Vergés i Fàbregas, Antoni Vila i Arrufat, Joan Vinyoli i Pladevall.

=== 1983 ===
- People: Josep Andreu i Lasserre Charlie Rivel, Carles Barral i Ayesta, José-Manuel Blecua Teijeiro, Pere Calafell i Gibert, Francisco Candel Tortajada, Josep Maria Castellet i Díaz de Cossio, Eliseu Climent i Corbera, Melcior Colet i Torrabadella, Leandre Cristòfol i Peralba, Miquel Dolç i Dolç, Núria Espert i Romero, Josep Maria Espinàs i Massip, Ramon Fabregat i Arrufat, Francesca Ferràndiz i Castells, Raimon Galí i Herrera, Pau Garsaball i Torrents, Joan Lluís Gili i Serra, Ignasi de Gispert i Jordà, Miquel Guinart i Castellà, Josep Guinovart i Bertran, Manuel Ibáñez i Escofet, Josep Iglésies i Fort, Josep Llovet i Mont-ros, Fernando Lázaro Carreter, Joan Magriñà i Sanromà, Montserrat Martí i Bas, Miquel Martí i Pol, Joan Mas i Cantí, Ramon Masnou i Boixeda, Josep Melià i Pericàs, Josep Miracle i Montserrat, Vicenç Montoliu i Massana "Tete Montoliu", Xavier Montsalvatge i Bassols, José-Antonio Novais Tomé, Josep Porter i Rovira, Josep Maria Puig i Salellas, Josep Pujol i Ripoll, Albert Ràfols i Casamada, Pere Ribot i Sunyer, Pau Riera i Sala, Rosa Sabater i Parera, Jordi Sarsanedas i Vives, Joan-Josep Tharrats i Vidal, José Maria Valverde Pacheco, Pere Verdaguer, Josep Maria Vilaseca i Marcet.
- Institutions: Abadia de Montserrat, Acadèmia de Ciències Mèdiques de Catalunya i Balears, Ateneu Barcelonès, Centre de Lectura de Reus, Centre Excursionista de Catalunya, Escola Pia de Catalunya, Foment de les Arts Decoratives (FAD), Unió Excursionista de Catalunya.

=== 1984 ===
- People: Jaume Aragall i Garriga, Miquel Arimany i Coma, Jaume Aymà i Mayol, Artur Bladé i Desumvila, Maria del Mar Bonet, Jordi Carbonell, Josep Deloncle, Josep Espar i Ticó, Francesc Esteve i Gàlvez, Josep Esteve i Soler, Josep Ferrater i Mora, Teodor Garriga i Osca, Josep Maria Gavín i Barceló, Sor Maria Gelonch i Tutusaus, Basilio Losada Castro, Oriol Martorell i Codina, Antoni de Moragas i Gallissà, Joaquim Muns Albuixech, Teresa Pàmies i Bertran, Ermengol Passola i Badia, Joan Pelegrí i Partegàs, Jaume Pi i Figueras, Ramon Piñeiro López, Cèsar Pi-Sunyer i Bayo, Joan Rocamora i Cuatrecasas, Maria Santpere i Hernàez, Pere Seras i Isern, Carme Serrallonga i Calafell, Joaquim Ventalló i Vergés, Marià Villangómez i Llobet, Lluís Virgili i Farrà.
- Institutions: Cobla Els Montgrins, Acció Cultural del País Valencià, Edicions 62 S. A., Escoles Professionals Salesianes, Federació Catalana d'Escoltisme i Guiatge, Fundació Bernat Metge, Fundació Blanquerna, Obra Cultural Balear, Òmnium Cultural, Orfeó Català.

=== 1985 ===
- People: Leandre Amigó i Batllori, Xavier Benguerel i Llobet, José Luis Cano García de la Torre, Josep Carner i Ribalta, Pere Català i Roca, Joan-Baptista Cendrós i Carbonell, Àngel Colomer i del Romero, Germà Colón i Domènech, Fèlix Cucurull i Tey, Núria Feliu i Mestres, Miquel Ferrer i Sanxís, Albert Folch i Rusiñol, Carles Fontserè i Carrió, José Agustín Goytisolo i Gay, Eudald Graells i Puig, Josep Grau i Garriga, Joan Hernàndez Pijuan, Antoni Jonch i Cuspinera, Nèstor Luján Fernández, Ceferí Olivé i Cabré, Josep Pedreira i Fernández, Vicenç Riera i Llorca, Tomàs Roig i Llop, Tilbert Dídac Stegmann, Salvador Torrell i Eulàlia, Xavier Valls i Subirà, Joan Vallvé i Creus, Manuel Vázquez Montalbán, Miquel Villà i Bassols, Albert Vives i Mir.
- Institutions: Assemblea Catalana de la Creu Roja, Cambra de Comerç i Indústria de Terrassa, Casal de Catalunya de Buenos Aires, Editorial Selecta, Fundació Jaume Bofill, Hospitalitat de la Mare de Déu de Lourdes, Institut Catòlic d'Estudis Socials de Barcelona, Institut Tècnic Eulàlia, Rafael Dalmau (Editor), Teatre Lliure, Volta Ciclista a Catalunya.

=== 1986 ===
- People: Ferran Arasa i Subirats, Víctor Manuel Arbeloa Muru, Antoni Maria Badia i Margarit, Josep Cañas i Cañas, Manuel Capdevila i Massana, Joan Casablancas i Bertran, Antoni Cayrol "Jordi-Pere Cerdà", Camilo-José Cela Trulock, Àngel Cortés i Dejuan, Bartomeu Costa-Amic, Lluís Ferran de Pol, Ramon Folch i Camarasa, Miquel de Garganta i Fàbrega, Ricard Giralt Miracle, Joaquim Homs i Oller, Josep Maria Lladó i Figueres, Mercè Llimona i Raymat, Josep Manyé i Vendrell, Joan-Antoni Maragall i Noble, Salvador Millet i Bel, Ambler Hodges Moss, Marçal Olivar i Daydí, Antoni Puigvert i Gorro, Carles Sala i Joanet, Ireneu Segarra i Malla, Carles Sentís i Anfruns, Rafael Solanic i Balius, Gaston Thorn, Francesc Vallverdú i Canes, Francesc Viadiu i Vendrell, Joaquim Vilarrúbia i Garet.
- Institutions: Cambra Oficial de Comerç, Indústria i Navegació de Barcelona, Institut Barraquer d'Oftalmologia, Llibreria Ona (de Barcelona), Fundació Puigvert (Institut d'Urologia, Nefrologia i Andrologia), Llibreria Símbol (de Manresa), Cobla els Lluïsos de Taradell, Oficina Olímpica de Barcelona, Orfeó Català de Mèxic, Orfeó Gracienc, Orfeó Lleidatà, Societat Castellonenca de Cultura.

=== 1987 ===
- People: Josep Amat i Pagès, Avel·lí Artís i Gener, Andreu-Avel·lí Artís i Tomàs, Joan Bofill i Tauler, Joan Bonet i Baltà, Anton Cañellas i Balcells, Antoni Caralps i Massó, Josep Maria Elias i Xivillé, Maria Rosa Farré i Escofet, Josep Ferrer i Sala, Carles Ferrer i Salat, Josep Maria Font i Rius, Feliu Formosa i Torres, Sebastià Gràcia i Petit, Samuel Haddas, Enric Jardí i Casany, Robert Lafont, Lluís Magaña i Martínez, Francesc Manunta i Baldino, Jordi Maragall i Noble, Joan Mercader i Riba, Francesc Noy i Farré, Francesc Orts i Llorca, Daniel Pagès i Raventós, Adolf Pizcueta i Alonso, Josep Maria Pons i Guri, Pere Ponsich, Antoni Puig i Planas, Josep Maria Pujadas i Forgas, Benet Ribas i Fugarolas, Marina Rossell i Figueras, Horacio Saenz Guerrero, Ramon Sarró i Burbano, Josep Solé i Barberà, Òscar Tusquets i Guillén, Joan Uriach i Marsal, Francesc Vilardell i Viñas.
- Institutions: ASPANIAS, Cavall Fort, Centre d'Estudis i Assessorament Metal·lúrgic (CEAM), Centre Català de Caracas, Cercle d'Economia, Editorial Moll, Escola Eina, Observatori de l'Ebre, Patronat del Misteri d'Elx, Saló Nàutic de Barcelona, Tretzevents.

=== 1988 ===
- People: Pilar Azemar i Puig de la Bellacasa, Pere Batlle i Huguet, Pierre Bonnassie, Robert Ignatius Burns, Delmiro de Caralt Puig, Lluís Carratalà i Vila, Marcel·lí Cella i Piqué, Josep Corredor Matheos, Pere Elias i Busqueta, Sabino Fernández Campo, Josep Ferrer-Bonsoms i Bonsoms, Pere Gimferrer i Torrens, Francesc Gomà i Musté, Lluís Maria Güell i Cortina, José Manuel Lara Hernández, Joan Llevadot i Estradé, Aina Moll i Marquès, Josep Palau i Fabre, Carmina Pleyan i Cerdà, Miquel Àngel Riera i Nadal, Josep Roca i Pons, Ramon Roca i Puig, Antoni Ros i Marbà, David H. Rosenthal, Ciril Rozman i Borstnar, Fernando Rubió i Tudurí, Jaime Rubio Álvarez, Joaquín Ruiz-Giménez Cortés, Miquel Siguan i Soler, Josep Soler i Vidal, Josep Vallverdú i Aixalà, Jaume Vidal i Alcover, Manuel Viusà i Camps, Geoffrey J. Walker.
- Institutions: La Cobla La Principal de la Bisbal, Agrupació Cultural Folklòrica Barcelona, Al Tall, Centre Català de Rosario, Cobla Orquestra La Selvatana, Coral Sant Jordi, Editorial La Galera, Escola Superior d'Administració i Direcció d'Empreses (ESADE), Escola Isabel de Villena, Institut d'Estudis Superiors d'Empresa (IESE), Sala Gaspar.

=== 1989 ===
Only one person was awarded

Ernest Dethorey i Camps.

=== 1990 ===
- People: Esteve Albert i Corp, Maria Matilde Almendros i Carcasona, Francesc Blancher i Puig, Pere Bohigas i Balaguer, Jordi Bonet i Armengol, Blai Bonet i Rigo, Esteve Busquets i Molas, Ramon Calsina i Baró, Maria Canals i Cendrós, Pere Casaldàliga i Pla, Maria Assumpció Clavell i Borràs, Josep Coll i Bardolet, Andreu Colomer i Munmany, Ignasi Maria Colomer i Preses, Nicolás Cotoner y Cotoner, Manuel Cubeles i Solé, Xavier Cugat i Mingall, Joan Culleré i Ibars, Fabián Estapé i Rodríguez, Kálmán Faluba, Celdoni Fonoll i Casanoves, Enrique Fuentes Quintana, Francesco Giunta, Albert Jané i Riera, Josep Maria Martí i Bonet, Enric Moreu-Rey, Anna Murià i Romaní, Joaquim Núñez i Roig, Manuel Olivencia Ruiz, Pere Pi-Sunyer i Bayo, Pons Cirac, Robert Pring-Mill, Antoni Ribera i Jordà, Jordi Savall i Bernadet, Josep Maria Tarrasa i Alvira, Josep Termes i Ardèvol, Miquel Torres i Carbó, Olga Xirinacs i Díaz, Alan Yates, Yutaka Kume, Yoshio Maruta.
- Institutions: APPS-Federació Catalana Pro Persones amb Disminució Psíquica, Càritas Diocesana, Centre Català de Santiago de Xile, Coordinació Catalana de Colònies, Casals i Clubs d'Esplai, Escolania de Montserrat, Fundació Congrés de Cultura Catalana, Institut del Teatre de la Diputació de Barcelona.

== 1990s ==
=== 1991 ===
- People: Carme Aymerich i Barbany, Manuel Balasch i Recort, Joan Bastardas i Parera, Pilar Bayés i de Luna, Oriol Bohigas Guardiola, Josep Buch i Parera, Federico Correa i Ruiz, Josep Eritja i Novell, Joan Ferràndiz i Castells, Josep Maria Garrut i Romà, Josep Maria Gasol i Almendros, Josep Maria Ginès i Pous, Cassià Maria Just i Riba, Antoni Malaret i Amigó, Concepció Martínez i Tudó, Joan Francesc Mira i Casterà, Emili Miró i Fons, Joan Oliu i Pich, Joan Oró i Florensa, Domènec Pallerola i Munné "Domènec de Bellmunt", Joan Perucho, Josep Piera i Rubió, Joan Potau i Farré, Climent Pujol i Villegas, Maria Assumpció Raventós i Torras, Gaietà Renom i Garcia, Josep Lluís Sagarra i Zacarini, Lars Söderberg, Francesc Torres Monsó, Domènec Umbert i Vilaseró, Josep Viader i Moliner, Joan Vilà i Moncau, Ricard Viladesau i Caner, Josep Virgili i Sanromà.
- Institutions: Acadèmia Catòlica de Sabadell, Col·legi d'Advocats de Barcelona, Companyia de Jesús de Catalunya, Enciclopèdia Catalana, Hospital de la Santa Creu i de Sant Pau, Institut Francès de Barcelona, Parròquia de Sant Andreu de Palomar i Casa Asil de Sant Andreu.

=== 1992 ===
- People: Pau Barceló i Faix, Jordi Barre, Antoni Batllori i Jofré, Maria Antònia Besora i Soler, Maria del Carme Bustamante i Serrano, Enric Casassas i Simó, Jordi Carbonell i Tries, David Cardús i Pascual, Francesc Català-Roca, Josep Còdol i Margarit, Xavier Corberó i Olivella, Josep Faulí i Olivella, Amadeu Fontanet i Clec, Joan Grijalbo i Serres, Casimir Martí i Martí, Genoveva Masip i Torner, Michel Meslin, Lluís Montané i Mollfulleda, Manuel de Muga i Toset, Antoni Maria Muntañola i Tey, Miquel Porter i Moix, Arnau Puig Grau, Enric Ras i Oliva, Teresa Soler i Pi, Viviane Reding, Pere Ribera i Ferran, Martí de Riquer i Morera, Albert Sans i Arís, Rafael Santos Torroella, Jesús Serra Santamans, Emili Teixidor Viladecàs, Joan Tena i Aran, Joan Torrent i Fàbregas, Josep Tremoleda i Roca, Montserrat Trueta i Llacuna, Maria Vilardell i Viñas, Emília Xargay i Pagès.
- Institutions: Amics de Corbera, AMPANS, Anglo-Catalan Society, Club d'Amics de la Unesco de Barcelona, Club Excursionista de Gràcia, Institut d'Estudis Eivissencs, Institut d'Estudis Nord-Americans, Futbol Club Barcelona.

=== 1993 ===
- People: Montserrat Andreu Batlló, Rafael Anglada i Rubí, Alexandre Argullós i Marimon, Alfred Badia i Gabarró, Mathilde Bensoussan, Ricard Bofill i Leví, Oriol de Bolòs i Capdevila, Péter Brachfeld Latzko, Luis Riu Bertran, Oriol Casassas i Simó, Per Denez, Lluís Figa i Faura, Lluís Folch i Camarasa, Enric Mañosas i Barrera, Miquel Milà i Sagnier, Pere Mir i Puig, Marcel·lí Moreta i Amat, Aurèlia Muñoz Ventura, Jaume Pla i Pallejà, Ignasi Ponti i Grau, Francesc Prat i Puig, Joaquim Maria Puyal i Ortiga, André Ricard Sala, Lluís Riu Bertran, Josep Romeu i Figueras, Cesáreo Rodríguez-Aguilera Conde, Manuel Saderra i Puigferrer, Genís Samper Triedu, Antoni Serra i Santamans, Enric Valor i Vives, Guillem Viladot i Puig.
- Institutions: Associació Internacional de Llengua i Literatura Catalanes, Associació Justícia i Pau de Barcelona, Casal Català de Montevideo, Castellers de Vilafranca, Centre Comarcal Lleidatà, Cercle Artístic de Sant Lluc, Colla Castellera Minyons de Terrassa, Colla Joves Xiquets de Valls, Colla Vella dels Xiquets de Valls, Federació de Cristians de Catalunya, La Cova del Drac, Orde Hospitalari Sant Joan de Déu, Polifònica de Puig-reig, Societat de Beneficència de Naturals de Catalunya.

=== 1994 ===
- People: Joan Alemany i Esteve, Joan Amorós i Pla, Maria Àngels Anglada i d'Abadal, Joan Batlles i Alerm, Josep Maria Bricall i Masip, Santiago Calatrava Valls, Manuel Capdevila i Font, Francesc d'Assís Casademont i Pou, Jaume Clavell i Nogueras, Albert Closas i Lluró, Salvador Escamilla i Gómez, Octavi Fullat i Genís, Jordi Galí i Herrera, Llorenç Gascon, Carles Güell de Sentmenat, Pere Güell i Garriga, Esyllt Thomas Lawrence, Carme Llauradó i Martí, Gonçal Lloveras i Vallès, Montserrat Pau i Piferrer, Antoni Pladevall i Font, Miquel Pujol i Grau, Roser Rahola d'Espona, Pau Roure, Joan Sagalés i Anglí, Lluís Antoni Santaló i Sors, Rosa Maria Sardà i Tàmaro, Salvador Sunyer i Aimeric, Joan Vilà i Valentí.
- Institutions: Casino l'Aliança del Poblenou, Centre Moral i Instructiu de Gràcia, Club Joventut Badalona, Colla Jove dels Xiquets de Tarragona, Col·legi Oficial de Metges de Barcelona, Grup Excursionista i Esportiu Gironí, Secretariat de Corals Infantils de Catalunya, Taller Escola Barceloneta.

=== 1995 ===
- People: Jean-Paul Alduy, Albert Balcells i Gonzàlez, Josep Maria Ballarín i Monset, Maur M. Boix i Selva, Josep M. Cadena i Catalán, Montserrat Carulla i Ventura, Jaume Codina Vilà, Maria Font de Carulla, Arcadi Garcia i Sanz, Salvador Giner i de San Julián, Enric Guitart i Matas, Josep M. Jané i Samsó, Jaume Lorés i Caballería, Alfred Lucchetti i Farré, Jaume Magre i Servet, Francesc Masclans i Girvès, Eduard Mendoza i Garriga, Mary Nash, Joan Peana, Roc Pifarré i Florejachs, Marià Ribas i Bertran, Frederic Roda Pérez, Manuel Sayrach i Fatjó dels Xiprers, Jorge Semprún, Jordi Torras i Comamala, Montserrat Torrent i Serra, Francesc Vila i Rufas (Cesc), Albert Virella i Bloda, Carmina Virgili i Rodón.
- Institutions: Amical de Mauthausen, Associació d'Amics de l'Arbre, Centre Excursionista Els Blaus, Club Infantil i Juvenil de Bellvitge, Col·legi de Periodistes de Catalunya, Foment Martinenc, Institut Guttmann, Institut de Reinserció Social, Mutual Mèdica de Catalunya i Balears, Obra del Ballet Popular, Societat Coral Obrera la Glòria Sentmenatenca, Societat Musical La Lira Ampostina.

=== 1996 ===
- People: Pedro Alier de Sanpera, Joaquim Alqueza i Puchol, Max Cahner, Lluís Claret i Serra, Teresa Cunillé i Rovira, Josep Dalmau i Olivé, Esteve Fàbregas i Barri, Gabriel Ferraté i Pascual, Enriqueta Gallinat i Roman, Xavier Garcia i Soler, Giuseppe Grilli, Teodor Hauschild, Josep Laporte i Salas, Joaquim Maluquer Sostres, Josep Massot i Muntaner, José María Mendiluce Pereiro, Montserrat Minobis i Puntonet, Francesc Mitjans Miró, Akio Morita, Ricard Salvat i Ferré, Juan Antonio San Epifanio Ruiz, Carles Sechi Ibba, Pere A. Serra Bauzà, Albert Serratosa i Palet, Carlota Soldevila, Mauricio Torra-Balari i de Llavallol, Adrià Trescents Ribó.
- Institutions: Acadèmia de Jurisprudència i Legislació de Catalunya, Agrupació Mútua del Comerç i de la Indústria, Associació Coordinadora per a l'Ancianitat, Associació Voltor, Comediants, Dagoll Dagom, Federació Catalana de Joves Cambres, Federació de Mutualitats de Catalunya, Festival Internacional de Música de Cantonigròs, Intermón, Lluïsos de Gràcia, Penya Joan Santamaria, Orde de Caputxins, Ràdio Arrels, Raimundus Lullus Institut.

=== 1997 ===
- People: Agustí Altisent i Altisent, Ramon Amigó i Anglès, Manuel Ausensi i Albalat, Josep Maria Benet i Jornet, Anthony Bonner, Pere Carbó i Casañas, Josep Maria Casas Boladeras, Júlia Corominas i Vigneaux, Jordi Costa i Mosella, Andreu Costafreda Montoliu, Josep Maria Dexeus i Trias de Bes, Núria Folch i Pi, Emili Giralt i Raventós, Joaquim Icart i Leonila, Joan Francesc de Lasa Casamitjana, Ramon Margalef i López, José María Martín Patino, Marta Mata i Garriga, Hans Meinke, Víctor Mora Pujadas, Jordi Nadal i Oller, Bob de Nijs, Patrick O'Meara, Octavio Pérez-Vitoria Moreno, Marta Pessarrodona i Artigues, Miquel Querol i Gavaldà, Roser Soliguer i Valls, Giuseppe Tavani, Harry Vernont Tozer, Vicent Ventura i Beltran, Joan Veny i Clar, Gerard Vergés i Príncep, Soledat Woessner i Casas, Ramon Xirau i Subias.
- Institutions: L'Arc de Berà SA., Colla Sardanista Violetes del Bosc, Els Nostres Clàssics, Esbart Dansaire de Rubí, Fundació Privada Pro Persones amb Disminució Psíquica Catalònia, Institució Bíblica Evangèlica de Catalunya, La Cuadra de Sevilla, Orquestra Maravella, Sícoris Club, Societat Musical Unió Filharmònica, Teatre-Museu Dalí.

=== 1998 ===
- People: Montserrat Abelló i Soler, Manuel Anglada i Ferran, Heinrich Bihler, Narcís Bonet i Armengol, Francesc de Paula Burguera i Escrivà, Francesc Cabana i Vancells, Gerard Claret i Serra, Joan Colomines i Puig, Joan Creus i Molist, Aurora Díaz-Plaja i Conestí, Mercè Diogène Guilera, Joan Echevarria Puig, Antonio Fraguas de Pablo, Josep M. Freixes i Cavallé, Iñaki Gabilondo Pujol, Maria Girona i Benet, Josep D. Guàrdia i Canela, Montserrat Gudiol i Corominas, Joseph Gulsoy, Pascual Iranzo i Oliete, Gabriel Janer Manila, Joan Llorens i Carrió, Joan Lluís i Pallarès, Joaquim Mallafrè i Gavaldà, Alexandre (Ignasi) Masoliver, Francesc Miñana i Armadàs, Gregori Mir i Mayol, Xavier Miserachs i Ribalta, Carles de Montoliu i Carrasco, Victor Moro Rodríguez, Mary Ann Newman, Luis del Olmo Marote, Antoni Pelegrí i Partegàs, Esteve Polls i Condom, Michael E. Porter, Pere Pubill i Calaf, Andreu Rabasa i Negre, Andreu Ribera i Rovira, Anton Sala-Cornadó, Giuseppe E. Sansone, Ramon Torrella i Cascante, Josep Ventosa i Palanca.
- Institutions: Amics dels Jardins, Amics dels Museus de Catalunya, Cobla la Principal d'Olot, Col·lecció Clàssics del Cristianisme, Col·legi Oficial de Metges de Tarragona, Companyia Filles de la Caritat de Sant Vicenç de Paül, Fundació Hospital de la Santa Creu de Vic, Fundació Noguera, Robafaves Llibres SCCL, North American Catalan Society (NACS).

=== 1999 ===
- People: Rafael Alberti Merello, Josep Altet i Font, Maria Teresa Barata i Gual, Joaquim Barraquer i Moner, Martí Boada i Juncà, Mercè Bruquetas i Lloveras, Rafael Caria, Antonio Colinas, John H. Elliott, Antonio Esteve Ródenas Antonio Gades, Vicenç Ferrer i Moncho, Climent Forner i Escobet, Joan Guinjoan i Gispert, Johannes Hösle, Bernat Lesfargues, Jordi LLimona i Barret, Josefina Matamoros, Pere Miró i Plans, Joaquim Molas, Rafael Moneo Vallés, Josep Lluís Ortega Monasterio, Jordi Pàmias i Grau, Raimon Pànikkar i Alemany, Josep J. Pintó i Ruiz, Leopold Pomés i Campello, Pere Portabella i Ràfols, Anna Ricci i Giraudo, Leopold Rodés Castañé, Francesc Rovira-Beleta, Josep Maria Rovira Belloso, Xavier Rubert de Ventós, Màrius Sampere i Passarell, Carles Santos i Ventura, Isabel-Clara Simó i Monllor, Antoni Subias i Fages, Estanislau Torres i Mestre, Montserrat Vayreda i Trullol, Antònia Vicens i Picornell, Antoni Vila Casas, Jill R. Webster.
- Institutions: Agrupació de Supervivents de la Lleva del Biberó-41, Associació de Paràlisi Cerebral, Col·legi Oficial de Doctors i Llicenciats en Filosofia i Lletres i en Ciències de Catalunya, Coordinadora de Tallers per a Minusvàlids Psíquics de Catalunya, Federació d'Associacions de la Tercera Edat de Catalunya, Federació Catalana d'Hoquei Patins, Fundació Esclerosi Múltiple, Institució Catalana d'Història Natural, Lliga Espiritual de la Mare de Déu de Montserrat, Reial Club de Tennis Barcelona, Revista Econòmica de Catalunya.

=== 2000 ===
- People: Enric Aguadé i Sans, Jordi Alumà Masvidal, Joan Becat, Jaume Casajoana i Roca, Maria Dolors Coll i Vendrell, Agustí Contijoch i Mestres, Joan Corominas i Vila, Lluís Duran i Barrionuevo, Manuel Esqué i Montseny, Miquel Esquirol i Clavero, Armand de Fluvià i Escorsa, Joan Gaspart Bonet, Pere Gol i Teixidor, Víctor Grífols i Lucas, Jordi Herralde Grau, Miguel Herrero y Rodríguez de Miñón, Avel·lí Ibàñez i Sensarrich, Josep Maria Jarque i Jutglar, Anna Lizarán Merlos, Núria Llimona Raymat, Lluís Llongueras Batlle, Esperança Martí i Salís, Carme Mateu Quintana, Simeó Miquel i Peguera, Jordi Mir i Parache, Silvestra Moreno i García, Manuel Mundó i Marcet, Joaquim Muntañola i Puig, Josep Antoni Oriol Novellas, Josep Oriol Panyella i Cortès, Carme Riera i Guilera, Lluís Roca-Sastre i Muncunill, Josep Ruaix i Vinyet, Jordi Sabater Pi, Josep Maria Solà-Solé, Marc Taxonera i Comas, Víctor Torres i Perenya, Ramon Trias i Rubiès, Curt Wittlin, Marie Claire Zimmermann.
- Institutions: Associació d'Amics de Sant Pere de Ponts, Companyia de Maria-Lestonnac, Diari de Vilanova, Escola Tècnica Superior d'Enginyeria Industrial de Barcelona, Federació Catalana de Futbol, Federació de Cors de Clavé, Honorable Col·legi de Cerers, Moviment Rialles de Catalunya, Ràdio Associació de Catalunya, Ràdio Barcelona, Reial Club Deportiu Espanyol.

== 2000s ==
=== 2001 ===
- People: Géza Alföldy, Jaume Arnella, Ramon Bagó and Agulló, Maria Barbal Farré, Joan Bellmunt and Figueras, Thomas N. Bisson, Artur Blasco and Giné, Joan Borràs and Basora, Marta Casals Istomin, Carles Cavallé Pinós, Manuel Cusachs and Xivillé, Josep Maria Oven and Coast, Valentí Carpenter of Carulla, Francesc Gurri Saw, Mirna Lacambra Domènech, Tomàs Mallol and Deulofeu, Enric Marco and Batlle (Withdrawal), Lluís Marsà and Abad, Valentí Miserachs Degree, Jesus Moncada and Estruga, Antoni Pérez and Simó, Joaquim Ramies and Chorions, Manuel Ribas and Piera, Joan Rodés Teixidor, Pere Blond and Salart, Manuel of Seabra, Francesc Todó Garcia, José of Udaeta, Frederic-Pau Verrié and Faget, Eulàlia Vintró Castles.
- Institutions: Associació de Components del Regiment Pirinenc núm. 1 de Catalunya, Nens del Vendrell, Colla de Castellers Xiquets de Tarragona, Col·legi de Censors Jurats de Comptes de Catalunya, Col·legi Oficial de Veterinaris de Barcelona, Escola Tècnica Professional del Clot, Federació Catalana de Basquetbol, Institució Cultural del CIC, Junta Constructora del Temple Expiatori de la Sagrada Família, La Roda d'Espectacles Infantils i Juvenils als Barris, Orfeó de Sants, Orfeó Manresà, Organització Nacional de Cecs Espanyols, Serra d'Or, Societat Catalana de Pediatria.

=== 2002 ===
- People: Joan Abelló Prat, Ferran Adrià Acosta, Narcís-Jordi Aragó i Masó, Xavier Arumí i Dou, Bartomeu Barceló i Pons, Miquel Boix i Carreras, Manuel Cabero i Vernedas, Jordi Cervós i Navarro, Marta Corachan i Cuyàs, Àlex Crivillé Tapias, Antoni Deig i Clotet, Rafael Foguet Ambrós, Miquel Forrellad Solà, Joan Fosas i Carreras, Lluís Gassó i Carbonell, Núria Gispert i Feliu, Joan Herrero i Manich, Renat Llech-Walter, Teresa Losada Campo, Fèlix Martí Ambel, Miquel Mascort i Riera, Jordi Miarnau i Banús, Pilar Mora i Roselló, Josep Palau i Francàs, Miquel Poblet Orriols, Josep Maria Puig Doria, Josep Maria Pujol Artigas, Jaume Rotés Querol, Teresa Rovira i Comes, Francesc Sanuy Gistau, Salvador Saumoy i Pellicer, Dolors Sistac Sanvicén, Toni Strubell i Trueta, Manuel Tobella i Marcet, Francesc Vendrell i Vendrell, Martí Vergés Trias, Joan Vernet i Ginés, Josep Lluís Vilaseca i Guasch, Antoni Vives Fierro.
- Institutions: Agrupació Musical Senienca, Associació ASPROS, Associació Catalana de Municipis i Comarques, Associació La Passió d'Olesa de Montserrat, Ateneu Hortenc, Castellers de Barcelona, Cercle Català de Madrid, Cercle Catòlic de Gràcia, Club Tennis de la Salut, Col·legi Major Universitari La Salle de Barcelona, Federació de Colles de Sant Medir de Barcelona, Federació de Municipis de Catalunya, L'Avenç, La Locomotora Negra, Ràdio Olot, Reial i Venerable Congregació de la Puríssima Sang de Nostre Senyor Jesucrist de Tarragona, Revista Jurídica de Catalunya.

=== 2003 ===
- People: Ignasi Aragó i Mitjans, Joaquim Arenas i Sampera, Josep Maria Bach i Voltas, David Bagué i Soler, Jana Balacciu Matei, Nadala Batiste i Llorens, Antoni Bayés de Luna, Marina Bru i Purón, Josefina Castellví i Piulachs, Jordi Clos Llombart, Henry Ettinghausen, José Ángel Ezcurra Carrillo, Josep Maria Figueras i Anmella, Xavier Folch i Recasens, Eduardo Foncillas Casaus, Jordi Font i Rodon, Climent Garau i Arbona, Josep Lladonosa i Giró, Pere Llorens i Lorente, Pere Lluís i Font, Ramon Miquel i Ballart, Antoni Mir i Fullana, Pedro Nueno Iniesta, Joan Palau Francàs, Mercè Pla i Cid, Manuel Riu i Riu, Encarna Roca i Trias, Montserrat de Salvador Deop, Jordi Sans i Sabrafen, Narcís Sayrach i Fatjó dels Xiprers, Simeó Selga i Ubach, Sebastià Serrano Farrera, Romà Sol i Clot, Joan Antoni Solans Huguet, Ko Tazawa, Núria Tortras i Planas, Jaume Vallcorba i Rocosa, Irene Vázquez Mier, Pere Vicens i Rahola, Jaume Vilalta i Gonzàlez, Carles Viver i Pi-Sunyer.
- Institutions: ACUDAM - Associació Comarcal Urgell d'Ajuda al Minusvàlid, Agrupació d'Antics Jugadors de Futbol del F. C. Barcelona, Associació Catalana d'Expresos Polítics, Associació Cultural dels Raiers de la Noguera Pallaresa, Associació d'Escriptors en Llengua Catalana, Associació de Publicacions Periòdiques en Català - APPEC, Associació de Veïns Sant Joan de Llefià-Gran Sol, Centre Catòlic de Sants, Consell dels Il·lustres Col·legis d'Advocats de Catalunya, Enginyeria i Arquitectura La Salle, Federació Nacional del Metall, Construcció i Afins de la Unió General de Treballadors de Catalunya (MCA-UGT), Foment de la Sardana de Banyoles, Fundació Jaume I (actualment Fundació Lluís Carulla), Medicus Mundi Catalunya, Taller de Músics.

=== 2004 ===
- People: Xavier Amorós Solà, Lina Badimon Maestro, Pilar Benejam i Arguimbau, Renada Laura Calmon-Ouillet, Roser Capdevila i Valls, Francesc Casares i Potau, Agustí Cohí Grau, Tomasa Cuevas Gutiérrez, Mercè Durfort i Coll, Marta Estrada i Miyares, Manel Giménez Valentí, Llorenç Gomis Sanahuja, Josep Llobera i Ramon, Xavier Lucaya i Layret, Pilar Malla Escofet, Manel Martínez Martínez, Manel de la Matta Sastre, Lola Mitjans Perelló, Agustí Montal i Costa, Miquel Núñez González, Sebastià Piera i Llobera, Mossèn Modest Prats i Domingo, Pedro Ruiz Torres, Carme Ruscalleda i Serra, Carme Sansa i Albert, Isabel Steva i Hernández (Colita), Josep Lluís Sureda i Carrión, Maria Dolors Torres Manzanera, Anna Veiga Lluch, Josep Vilarasau Salat.
- Institutions: Amical de Catalunya dels Antics Guerrillers Espanyols a França, Associació Amics de la Seu Vella de Lleida, Associació d'Exinternats del Franquisme a Catalunya, Casino Menestral Figuerenc, Círcol Catòlic de Badalona, Club Muntanyenc Sant Cugat, Cobla La Principal del Llobregat, Col·legi Oficial de Metges de Lleida, Cooperativa Obrera Tarraconense, Escola Universitària d'Infermeria Santa Madrona de la Fundació "la Caixa", Institut Joan Lluís Vives, Orquestra Nacional de Cambra d'Andorra, Tamaia Associació de dones contra la violència familiar.

=== 2005 ===
- People: Montserrat Aguer Teixidor, Luis Arribas Castro, Pilar Aymerich i Puig, Joaquim Bonal de Falgàs (a títol pòstum), Fàtima Bosch i Tubert, Anna Cabré i Pla, Neus Català Pallejà, Gaspar Espuña i Berga, Francesc Ferrer i Gironès, Elisabeth Galí i Camprubí, Joana M. Guasp Mañé, Ramon Guardans i Vallès, Manuel Lladonosa i Vall-Llebrera, Lluís Marrasé i Meler, Frederic Mayor i Zaragoza, Biel Mesquida i Amengual, Margarita Nuez Farnos, Josep Pernau i Riu, Manuel Pertegaz Ibáñez, Josep Prenafeta i Gavaldà, Lluís Puig i Ferriol, Rosa Regàs i Pagès, Maria Rovira i Duran, Matilde Salvador Segarra, Maria Salvo Iborra, Anna Sanmartí i Sala, Àngels Santos Torroella, Antoni Serra i Ramoneda, Joan Solà i Cortassa, Josep Subirats i Piñana, Esther Tusquets Guillén, Mercedes Vilanova Ribas.
- Institutions: Associació de pares de minusvàlids del Baix Camp, Centre Excursionista de Lleida, Club Natació Sabadell, Col·legi Públic Sant Jaume, Consell de Col·legis de Procuradors dels Tribunals de Catalunya, Dones Juristes, Fundació Patronat de les Escoles La Salle (Cassà de la Selva), Grup Àgata, Institut Químic de Sarrià, Jazz Terrassa, Monestir de Santa Maria de Poblet, PEN català, Plataforma en Defensa de l'Ebre, Venerable Congregació de la Mare de Déu dels Dolors de Besalú, Llotja de Cereals de Barcelona.

=== 2006 ===
- People: Francesc Abel i Fabre, Antònia Adroher i Pascual, Santiago Alcolea i Gil, Tomàs Alcoverro i Muntané, Josep Maria Andreu i Forns, Joan Argenté i Artigal, Jaime Arias Zimerman, Enrique Badosa Pedro, Carmen Balcells Segalà, Anna Balletbó i Puig, Miguel Beato del Rosal, Roser Bofill Portabella, M. Antònia Canals i Tolosa, Manuel Castellet i Solanas, Manuel Castells Oliván, Jordi Cervelló i Garriga, Jean-François Coche, Isabel Coixet Castillo, Joan Colom i Altemir, Johan Cruyff, Franz-Paul Decker, Eulàlia Duran i Grau, Elisabeth Eidenbenz, Odón Elorza González, Salvador Fà i Llimiana, Domènec Fita i Molat, Josep Fontana i Lázaro, Mossèn Daniel Fortuny i Pons, Josep Fradera i Soler, Antonio Franco Estadella, Javier Godó Muntañola, Barbara Hendricks, Robert Hughes, Josu Jon Imaz San Miguel, Joaquim Marco i Revilla, Lluís Martí Bielsa, Andreu Mas-Colell, Oriol Maspons i Casades, Joan Massagué i Solé, Josep Maria Mestres Quadreny, Anna Maria Moix i Meseguer, José Monleón Bennácer, Beatriz de Moura, Maria Lluïsa Oliveda Puig, Raúl Padilla López, Ricard Pérez Casado, Antón Pont i Amenós, Joana Raspall i Juanola, Miquel Roca i Junyent, Antonina Rodrigo García, Ricardo Rodrigo, Vicente Rojo, Carmel Rosa Baserba, Ramon Saladrigues i Fernández, Sebastià Salvadó Plandiura, Andreas Schleef, Narcís Serra i Serra, Carme Solé Vendrell, Jordi Soler i Galí "Toti Soler", Sebastià Sorribas i Roig, Marina Subirats i Martori, Jaume Tomàs i Sabaté, Josep Vicente Romà.
- Institutions: Agrupació Fotogràfica de Catalunya, Associació Catalana de la Premsa Comarcal (ACPC), Associació de Familiars de Represaliats pel Franquisme, Associació per a la recuperació de la memòria històrica de Catalunya (ARMHC), Cambra Oficial de Comerç i Indústria de Manresa, Centre Catòlic de Blanes, Circ RALUY, Club Gimnàstic de Tarragona S.A.D., Club Patí Voltregà, Colla Castellera Xiquets de Reus, Il·lustre Col·legi d'Advocats de Sabadell, Il·lustre Col·legi Oficial de Veterinaris de Lleida, Institut de l'Empresa Familiar, Institut d'Estudis Vallencs, Associació d'Actors i Directors Professionals de Catalunya (AADPC).

=== 2007 ===
- People: Eduard Bajet i Royo, Sara Maria Blasi i Gutiérrez, Àngel Casas Mas, Francesc Xavier Ciuraneta Aymí, Carles Duarte i Montserrat, Teresa Duran i Armengol, Rosa Maria Estrany Llorens, Josep Lluís Fernández i Padró, August Gil Matamala, José Manuel Lara Bosch, Rosa Novell Clausells, Maria-Antònia Oliver i Cabrer, Bonaventura Pons Sala, Victòria Sau Sánchez, Jordi Solé Tura, Ricard Torrents i Bertrana, Núria Pompeia Vilaplana i Boixons, Xavier Vinader i Sánchez, Maria Rosa Virós i Galtier, Jorge Wagensberg Lubinski.
- Institutions: Associació Casal dels Infants del Raval, Associació Catalana de Víctimes d'Organitzacions Terroristes, Associació Catalana per la Infància Maltractada, Associació La Bressola, Club Esportiu Europa, Club Natació Barcelona, Federació d'Associacions de Mares i Pares d'Alumnes de Catalunya (FaPaC), Fundació Catalana Tutelar Aspanias, Fundació Cobla La Principal d'Amsterdam, Museu del Joguet de Catalunya/Figueres, Pastorets de l'Ametlla de Merola (Agrupació Cultural Esplai).

=== 2008 ===
- People: Nolasc Acarín i Tusell, Jaume Arenas i Mauri, Francina Boris i Codina, Josep Cassú i Serra, Jaume Cela i Ollé, Francesc Codina i Castillo, Jordi Dauder, Montserrat Estil·les Torrente, Ricard Fornesa i Ribó, Joaquima Júdez i Fageda, Eulàlia Lledó i Cunill, Antoni Lloret i Orriols, Jordi Petit, Anna Maleras i Colomé, Josep Maria Massons i Esplugas, Jordi Peix i Massip, Empar Pineda i Erdozia, Enric Piquet i Miquel, Jacint Ros i Hombravella, Mercè Sala i Schnorkowski, Rosa Serra i Puigvert, Jaume Sobrequés i Callicó, José María Socias Humbert, Anna Tarrés i Campa.
- Institutions: Associació Pro-memòria als Immolats per la Llibertat a Catalunya, Ateneu Agrícola, Ateneu Igualadí de la Classe Obrera, Consorci Hospitalari de Catalunya, Federació Catalana de Tennis, Mútua dels Enginyers de Catalunya, Mútua de Terrassa, Secretariat d'Escola Rural, USP Institut Universitari Dexeus.

=== 2009 ===
- People: Isak Andic Ermay, Isabel Arqué i Gironès, Lluís Barraquer i Bordas, Jaume Canyameres i Cortàzar, Adriana Casademont i Ruhí, Myrtha/Beatriz Casanova Mederos, Maria Assumpció Català i Poch, Josep Colomer i Maronas, Cristóbal Colón Palasí, Josep-Manuel Corrales Recasens, Joan Coscubiela i Conesa, Santiago Dexeus Trias de Bes, Enric Frigola Viñas, Maria Teresa Giménez i Morell, Juana Martín Martín, Feliu Matamala i Teixidor, Ana María Matute Ausejo, José María Murià Rouret, Manuel Pousa Engroñat, Josep Maria Pujol i Gorné, Teresa Roca i Formosa, Joan Sabater i Tobella, Neus Sanmartí i Puig, Manuel de Solà-Morales i Rubió, Josep Tarragó i Colominas, Éliane Thibaut-Comelade, Suk Man Yu.
- Institutions: Antic Gremi de Traginers d'Igualada, Caixa d'Estalvis de Sabadell, Casino de Vic, Cos consular a Barcelona, Esbart Manresà de Dansaires, Fils et Filles de Républicains Espagnols et Enfants de l'Exode, Fundació Ajuda i Esperança, Fundació Alfonso Comín, Fundació Carl Faust, Fundació Catalana Síndrome de Down, Fundació Joan Miró, Gremi de Flequers de Barcelona, Museu Geològic del Seminari de Barcelona, Premi Iluro de Monografia Històrica, Unió Esportiva Sant Andreu.

=== 2010 ===
- People: Jaume Alsina i Calvet, Alberto Aza Arias, Agustí Maria Bassols i Parés, Joan Botam i Casals, Helena Cambó i Mallol, Montserrat Carulla i Font, Teresa Maria Castanyer i Bachs, Josep Maria Codina i Vidal, Joaquim Díaz i Muntané, Isidre Fainé i Casas, Maria Àngels Falqués Avril, Maria Lluïsa Ferrer i Martínez, Josep Fornas i Martínez, Salvador Gabarró Serra, Tomàs Gil i Membrado, Josep Antoni González i Casanova, Francesc González Ledesma, Jordi Gumí i Cardona, Carlos Jiménez Villarejo, María Dolores Juliano Corregido, Teresa Juvé Acero, Manuel López Lozano, José María de Mena Álvarez, David Moner i Codina, Manuel Oltra i Ferrer, Maria Pàrraga i Escolà, Manuel Pérez Bonfill, Jordi Porta i Ribalta, Joan Rosell i Sanuy, Carles Sumarroca i Coixet, Maria Tersa i Miralles, Joan Vila i Grau.
- Institutions: Associació de Mestres Rosa Sensat, Associació del Via Crucis Vivent, Casa Catalana de Saragossa, Casino Unió Comercial, Esbart Català de Dansaires, Escola Valenciana – Federació d'Associacions per la Llengua, Federació de Grups Amateurs de Teatre de Catalunya, Il·lustre Col·legi de Notaris de Catalunya, Llotja de Reus, Memorial dels Treballadors de Seat, Orde de la Mercè. Província de Catalunya-Aragó, Societat Coral La Badalonense, Unió Catalana d'Hospitals. Associació d'Entitats Sanitàries i Socials.

== 2010s ==
=== 2011 ===
- People: Salvador Alemany i Mas, Maria Dolors Bassols i Teixidor, Alessandro Benuzzi, Miquel Bruguera i Cortada, Josep Maria Casasús i Guri, Joan Colom i Naval, Montserrat Colomer i Salmons, Jordi Cots i Moner, Ramon Cuello i Riera, Lluís Duch i Álvarez, Josep Antoni Duran i Lleida, Concepció Ferrer i Casals, Montserrat Figueras i Garcia, Carles Alfred Gasòliba i Böhm, Stefano Grondona, Sebastià Millans i Rosich, Antoni Negre i Villavecchia, Ramon Pascual de Sans, Jaume Pla i Pladevall, Antoni Prat i Seuba, Francesc Puchal i Mas, Eduard Punset i Casals, Juan de Dios Ramírez Heredia, Maria Dolors Renau i Manén, Josep Ribas i González, Francesc Riera i Cuberes, Domènec Romera i Alcázar, Simon Schwartz i Riera, Josep Verde i Aldea.
- Institutions: Agrupació Coral La Llàntia, Associació d'Amics de l'Escola Normal de la Generalitat, Associació d'Aviadors de la República, Casa Amèrica Catalunya, Centre Excursionista de Terrassa, Club Deportiu Terrassa Hockey, Col·lectiu de Dones en l'Església, Confederació Ecom Catalunya, Confraria de Sant Sebastià, Congregació de Germanes Carmelites de la Caritat-Vedruna, Esbart Teatral de Castellar del Vallès, L'Eco de Sitges, Orquestra Melodia, Pessebre Vivent de Castell d'Aro, Societat Coral Aroma Vallenca.

=== 2012 ===
- People: Núria Albó i Corrons, Jusèp Amiell Solè, Colman Andrews, Lluís Bassat Coen, Eduard Blanxart i Pàmies, Dolors Canal Vilarrasa, Pere Carbonell i Fita, Rosa Maria Carrasco i Azemar, Eduard Castellet i Díaz de Cossío, Joan Cervera i Batariu, Dolors Folch i Fornesa, Eugeni Forcano i Andreu, Martí Gasull i Roig (a títol pòstum), Francesc Granell i Trias, Josep Lloveras i Feliu, Josep Maixenchs i Agustí, Rafel Marquina i Audouard, Francisco Martín Frías, Francesc Martínez de Foix i Llorens, Casimiro Molins Ribot, Francisco Morán Ruiz, Isona Passola Vidal, Jaume Plensa Suñé, Robert Roqué Jutglà, Josep Serra i Llimona, Josep Maria Ventura i Ferrero.
- Institutions: Associació per a les Nacions Unides a Espanya, Escola d'Administració Pública de Catalunya, Fundació Banc dels Aliments de Barcelona, Fundació Blanquerna, Fundació Conservatori del Liceu, Fundació Festa Major de Gràcia, Fundació Marianao, Fundació Privada Amics de la Gent Gran, Fundació Privada de la Passió d'Esparreguera, Trinijove, Gremi de Constructors d'Obres de Barcelona i Comarques, La Lira Vendrellenca, Societat Catalana de Biologia, Societat Coral El Penedès, Societat Coral Erato.

=== 2013 ===
- People: Maria Assumpció Balaguer i Golobart, Pere Balsells i Jofre, Josep Maria Bosch Aymerich, Raimon Carrasco i Azemar, Narcís Comadira i Moragriega, Ricard Fernández Deu, Antoine Gallimard, Daniel Giralt-Miracle i Rodríguez, Andreu Gispert i Llavet, Ramon Gomis de Barbarà, Romà Gubern Garriga-Nogués, Pepita Llunell i Sanahuja, Daniel Martínez de Obregón, Maria Martorell i Codina, Montserrat Maspons i Bigas, Concepció Mata i Fuentes, Francesc Piñas i Brucart, Joan Planes Vila, Josep Raimon Prous Cochs, Josep Maria Queraltó i Bonell, Jordi Rius i Garriga, Jordi Roch i Bosch, Josep Lluís Rovira Escubós, Anna Santamaria i Tusell, Julio Sorigué Zamorano.
- Institutions: Agrupació Excursionista Catalunya, Associació d'Enginyers Industrials de Catalunya, Associació de Veïns i Amics de Calella de Palafrugell, Associació de Sant Tomàs Pro-Persones amb Retard Mental d'Osona (PARMO), Centre Moral d'Arenys de Munt, Centre Moral i Cultural del Poblenou, Club Natació Atlètic Barceloneta, Col·legi Oficial de Titulats Mercantils i Empresarials de Barcelona, Confraria de Sant Marc Evangelista de Mestres Sabaters de Barcelona, Cor Vivaldi – Petits Cantors de Catalunya, Escola de Música Joan Llongueres, Fundació Comissió Cavalcada dels Reis d'Igualada, Gremi de Marejants de Tarragona, Reus Deportiu, Societat Coral l'Esperança.

=== 2014 ===
- People: Xavier Benguerel i Godó, Joana Biarnés i Florensa, José Manuel Blecua Perdices, Alegría Borrás i Rodríguez, Josep Maria Busquets i Galera, Jaume Cabré Fabré, Aureli Casabona i Bel, Enric Crous i Millet, Xesús Miguel de Toro Santos, Macari Gómez Quibus, Rosa Gratacós i Masanella, Joan Josep Guinovart i Cirera, Joan Llort i Badies, Marià-Ignasi Marroyo i Rodríguez, Josep Maria Martí i Martí, Ricard Masó i Llunes, Rosa Maria Oriol Porta, Lluís Pagès Marigot, Francesc Panyella i Farreras, Victòria Peña Carulla, Enric Puig i Jofra, Hilari Raguer i Suñer, Mercè Riera Manté, Josep Maria Sala i Xampeny, Sergi Schaaff i Casals. A títol pòstum: Lluís Martí i Bosch, Joan Montanyès i Martínez
- Institutions: Casino Llagosterenc, Confederació Sindical de la Comissió Obrera Nacional de Catalunya, Coral El Llessamí, Els Pescadors de l'Escala, Federació d'Ateneus de Catalunya, Federació Salut Mental Catalunya, Fundació Busquets de Sant Vicenç de Paül, Fundació d'Oncologia Infantil Enriqueta Villavecchia, Fundació Vidal i Barraquer, Institut d'Estudis Penedesencs, Institut Pere Mata, Organització Catalana de Trasplantaments, Reial Acadèmia de Ciències i Arts de Barcelona, Societat Coral Diana, Unió General de Treballadors de Catalunya.

=== 2015 ===
- People: Jordi Aguadé i Clos, Josep Miquel Aixalà i Martí, Josep Maria Aragonès i Rebollar, Peter Bush, Maria Teresa Cabré i Castellví, Ramon Coll i Huguet, Manuel Antoni Condeminas Hughes, Lluís Coromina Isern, Llibert Cuatrecasas i Membrado, Joan de Muga Dòria, Eudald Maideu i Puig, Jesús Massip i Fonollosa, Vicenta Pallarès i Castelló, Lluís Pasqual i Sánchez, Joan Pera, Agustí Pons i Mir, Philippe Saman, Mercè Sampietro i Marro, Llorenç Sànchez i Vilanova, Anna Soler-Pont, Carles Vallbona i Calbó, Emma Vilarasau Tomàs, Miquel Vilardell i Tarrés, Carles Vilarrubí i Carrió. A títol pòstum: Jacint Mora i Obrador, Francesc Xavier Vilamala i Vilà.
- Institutions: Agrupació Sardanista l'Ideal d'en Clavé de les Roquetes, Alter Mútua de Previsió Social dels Advocats de Catalunya a Quota Fixa, ASPASIM, Associació Egueiro, Cadí Societat Cooperativa Catalana Limitada, Casa Pairal Fundació Privada, Castells i Planas de Cardedeu, Comunitat de Monges Benedictines del Monestir de Sant Daniel de Girona, Confraria de Mestres Fusters i Gremi de Fusters, Ebenistes i Similars de Barcelona, Facultat de Biblioteconomia i Documentació de la Universitat de Barcelona, Fundació Hospital de Sant Pau i Santa Tecla, Fundació Privada Vallès Oriental, Grup de Treball Estable de les Religions, Hospital del Mar, Teatre Romea.

=== 2016 ===
- People: Aureli Argemí i Roca, Enric Argullol i Murgadas, Emili Armengol i Abril, Josep Bastons i Fàbrega, Joan S. Beltran i Cavaller, Mercè Boada Rovira, Òscar Cadiach i Puig, Carles Canut i Bartra, Bonaventura Clotet Sala, Carles Colomer Casellas, Josefa Contijoch Pratdesaba, Sol Daurella i Comadran, Josep Enric Llebot Rabagliati, Jordi Llovet Pomar, Guillem López Casasnovas, Maria Victòria Molins, Josep Navarro Vives, Ada Parellada i Garrell, Artur Quintana i Font, Josep-Enric Rebés Solé, Joandomènec Ros i Aragonès, Josep Santacreu i Bonjoch, Josep Sendra i Navarro, Carles Taché Mitjans, Kikuro Tani, Mateo Valero i Cortés, Mariàngela Vilallonga Vives
- Institutions: Acadèmia Tastavins del Penedès, Associació Caramelles del Roser, Associació de Familiars i Amics de Nens Oncològics de Catalunya, Consell Cultural de les Valls d'Àneu, Coordinadora d'Associacions per la Llengua Catalana, Festival Internacional de Música Castell de Peralada, Fundació La Marató de TV3, Fundació Pere Tarrés, Fundació Vila Casas, Institut Ramon Muntaner de Figueres, Lluïsos d'Horta, Revista de Catalunya, Sala Cabanyes, Secció Teatral del Centre Catòlic de Mataró

=== 2017 ===
- People: Fina Birulés i Bertran, Ramon Boixadós i Malé, Francesc Burrull i Ill, Eusebi Casanelles i Rahola, Montserrat Catalan i Benavent, Rosa Clarà i Pallarès, Miquel Crusafont i Sabater, Josep Cuní i Llaudet, Romà Cuyàs i Sol, Rosa Fabregat i Armengol, Montserrat Freixer i Puntí, Teresa Gimpera i Flaquer, Víctor Grífols i Roura, Anna Hospital i Ribas, Joan Martí i Castell, Gemma Mengual i Civil, Jaume Miranda i Canals, Joaquim Molins i Amat, Jaume Padrós i Selma, Josep Maria Pou i Serra, Borja de Riquer i Permanyer, Lluís Roura i Juanola, Josep Ildefons Suñol i Soler, Guillem Terribas i Roca, Miquel Valls i Maseda. Posthumously: Maria Pilar Busquet e Medan, Carme Chacón Piqueras, Joaquim Ferrer i Roca, Xavier Melgarejo i Draper.
- Institutions: Amics de la Cultura de Sant Martí de Llémena, Associació Centre Cultural El Social de Terrassa, Associació Projecte dels Noms, Associació de Víctimes de la Talidomida, Caramelles de Tous, Casino Prado Suburense, Caves Llopart, Centre Sant Pere Apòstol, Club Balonmano Granollers, Club de Golf Sant Cugat, Club de Natació Reus Ploms, Il·lustre Col·legi d'Advocats de Figueres - Alt Empordà, Il·lustre Col·legi d'Advocats de Mataró, Col·legi d'Aparelladors, Arquitectes Tècnics i Enginyers d'Edificació de Barcelona, Elenc Artístic Arbocenc, Festival Internacional de Cinema Fantàstic de Catalunya - Sitges Film Festival, Fundació ACIS (Agrupació Cultural i Social), Fundació Joan Maragall - Cristianisme i Cultura, Fundació Privada Espai Guinovart, Fundació Privada Olga Torres, Fundació Ramon Noguera, Llibreria Serret, Reial Arxiconfraria de Nostra Senyora de la Cinta de Tortosa, Societat Recreativa El Retiro.

=== 2018 ===
The delivery of the Creu de Sant Jordi Award 2018 were suspended due to the application of article 155 of the Spanish Constitution and the lack of government of the Generalitat. On May 12 of the same year, the government of the exile of Carles Puigdemont proposed the following candidates to receive the Sant Jordi cross 2018. The awards were ratified in July.

- People: Eduard Admetlla Lázaro, Victòria Almuni Balada, Francesc 'Xicu' Anoro Zuferri, Margarida Aritzeta i Abad, Tomàs Barris Ballestín, Lourdes Benería Farré, Lucía Caram Padilla, Teresa Casals, Joan i Martí Castells Badia, Teresa Clota i Pallàs, Josep Cruanyes Tor, Amadeu Cuito i Hurtado, Roger Español i Tor, Josep Antoni Fernández i Fernández (Fer), Assumpció Malagarriga Rovira, Rosa Maria Malet i Ybern, Santiago Marrè Burcet, Franca Masu, Carme Mayol Fernández, Leonora Milà Romeu, Pepita Pardell Terrade, Artur Ramon i Picas, Maria Rius i Camps, Josep Maria Roset Camps, Jordi Sierra i Fabra, Nemesi Solà i Franquesa, Joan Soler i Amigó, Dolors Udina Abelló, Roser Vernet Anguera i Joan Viñas Salas.
- Institutions: ABACUS, S.Coop. CL, Agrupacions de defensa forestal, Alzheimer Catalunya, Fundació Privada, Associació "Ateneu de Sant Just Desvern", Associació Casal Societat La Principal, Associació Casino La Unió de Vidreres, Associació Catalana pels Drets Civils, Associació Cor Claverià l'Aliança de Lliçà d'Amunt, Associació Cultural La Colmena de Santa Coloma, Associació de Bombers Voluntaris de la Generalitat de Puigcerdà, Associació d'Editors en Llengua Catalana, Associació Orfeó Sarrianenc, Associació Societat Coral "El Vallès", Cercle Filatèlic i Numismàtic de Ripoll, Fundació privada puntCAT, Fundació PROA (Proactiva Open Arms), Marduix Teatre, Nits Musicals de Guardiola de Berguedà, Orfeó Reusenc, Reial Societat Arqueològica Tarraconense, Societat Cultural i Recreativa La Cumprativa, Societat Recreativa El Centre, Unió de Consells Esportius de Catalunya, Unió de Federacions Esportives de Catalunya.

=== 2019 ===
- People: Lluís Albert i Rivas, Joana Amat Amigó, Montserrat Andreu Teixidó, Virgil Ani, Ernest Benach i Pascual, Núria de Gispert i Català, Carles Furriols i Solà, Carme Giralt i Rosés, Josep González i Sala, Maria Carme Junyent i Figueras, Lluís Juste de Nin, Montserrat Juvanteny Juvanteny, Biel Majoral, Núria Marín García, Lionel Andrés Messi Cuccittini, Mercè Otero Vidal, Albert Peters, Núria Picas i Albets, Josep Pla-Narbona San Antonio, Núria Quadrada i Damont, Joaquim Rafel i Fontanals, Gemma Rigau i Oliver, Joan Rigol i Roig, Fina Rubio Serrano, Benedetta Tagliabue, Jaume Terradas i Serra, Montserrat Úbeda i Pla, Ivo Vajgl i Antoni Vidal Miquel.
- Institutions: Associació Cívica per la Llengua El Tempir, Ateneu de Tàrrega, Casal Catòlic de Sant Andreu de Palomar, Coral Capella de Santa Maria de Ripoll, Escola Universitària d'Infermeria i Teràpia Ocupacional de Terrassa, Facultat de Nàutica de Barcelona, Fundació Privada Família i Benestar Social, Federació Catalana d'Entitats Corals, Federació de Moviments de Renovació Pedagògica de Catalunya, Fundació Carles Salvador, Fundació Museu Etnogràfic Vallhonrat, Fundació Privada ALTEM, Fundació Privada ARED, Fundació Privada ASPRONIS i La Trinca.

=== 2020 ===
- People: Àngels Alabert i Feliu, Josep Amat i Girbau, Miquel Barceló i Artigues, Roser Bru Llop, Purificació Canals i Ventín, Antoni Canu, Teresa Capell Capell, Eduard Carbonell i Esteller, Imma Colomer Marcet, Maria Josep Cuenca Ordinyana, Joan Estruch i Gibert, Jordi Fàbregas i Canadell, Jordi Galí i Garreta, Rosa Maria Garriga i Llorente, Gerhard Grenzing, Mossèn Benigne Marquès i Sala, Anna Mercadé i Ferrando, Pere Miró i Sellarés, Jordi Monés i Pujol-Busquets, Josep Maria Monferrer i Celades, Josep Maria Nadal i Farreras, Sol Picó, Míriam Ponsa, Montserrat Pujolar i Giménez, Joan Ramon Resina, Carme Salvador i Guillem Agulló, Laia Sanz Pla-Giribert, Carme Valls Llobet
- Institutions: Aire Nou de Bao, Associació Cultural del Gremi de Pagesos de Sant Llorenç i Sant Isidre, Associació Recull Blanes, Aules d'Extensió Universitària per a la Gent Gran de Barcelona, Banda Municipal de Música d'Alcanar, Ecomuseu de les Valls d'Àneu, Federació d'Entitats Excursionistes de Catalunya (FEEC), Fundació Hospital de Sant Jaume i Santa Magdalena de Mataró, Fundació Privada Hospital de Campdevànol, Fundació Sanitària Sant Pere Claver, Germans Roca, Orfeó Nova Solsona, Pallassos Sense Fronteres, Pro Discapacitats Fundació Privada Terrassenca, Taller Àuria, SCCL

=== 2021 ===
- People: Jesús Alturo i Perucho, Mariona Carulla i Font, Anna Rosa Cisquella i Passada, Ernest Costa i Savoia, Joana Escobedo i Abraham, Isabel Etxeberria Gorriti, Pau Gasol i Sáez, Manuel Heredia Jiménez Tío Manuel, Francisco Ibáñez Talavera, Mercè Izquierdo i Aymerich, Elena Jaumandreu i Garrido, Enric Larreula i Vidal, Justo Molinero Calero, Anna Navarro Descals / Anna N. Schlegel, Joan Panisello i Chavarria, Alèxia Putellas i Segura, Àngels Ribé i Pijuan, Mònica Terribas i Sala, Rafael Tous i Giner, Francesc Vilasís i Fernández-Capalleja
- Institutions: Associació Cultural Recreativa Unió Calafina, Associació de Voluntaris de Protecció Civil d'Argentona, Col·legi d'Enginyers Tècnics Industrials de Barcelona, Col·legi d'Arquitectes de Catalunya, Consell de Col·legis d'Infermeres i Infermers de Catalunya, Els Pets, Escola de Grallers de Sitges, Federació Catalana de Natació, Fundació Catalana de l'Esplai, Societat Catalana de Medicina Familiar i Comunitària

=== 2022 ===
- People: Andreu Vilasís i Fernàndez-Capalleja, Carme Elias Boada, Carme Trilla i Bellart, Fàtima Ahmed, Hisao Suzuki, Jaume Mateu Bullich Tortell Poltrona, Joan Carles Doval Garcia, Jordi Puig Suari, Josep Espunyes i Esteve, Josep Minguell Cardenyes, Laia Palau Altés, Lluís Parés Ramoneda, Lluís Torner Sabata, Mari Chordà Recasens, Maria Carme Cardó i Soler, Maria Olivares i Usac, Marina Vilalta i Fajula, María del Carmen Llasat Botija, Miquel Strubell i Trueta, Rosa Maria Duran i Gili
- Institutions:

=== 2023 ===
- People:
- Institutions:
