= Jesús Rodríguez Picó =

Spanish musician (born 1953)

Jesús Rodríguez Picó (born Barcelona, Spain, 12 July 1953) is a composer of contemporary classical music, a clarinet player and a pedagogue. He studied at the Conservatori del Liceu where he obtained a certificate as a clarinet teacher, completing his training in France. He collaborated with many ensembles specialized in the contemporary repertoire, like the Grup Instrumental Català (GIC) and Solars Vortices, as well as forming a duo with the pianist Manuel Cabero. As a performer, he has strived to promote clarinet music and contemporary music, in addition to working in musical pedagogy and in various fields relating to cultural management.

== Career ==
Rodríguez Picó has written a lot of chamber music and particularly works written for the clarinet or the saxophone, and is often the result of his friendship and collaboration with different instrumentalists. Some examples are Sonata Marina, for saxophone and piano, and Volt, Preludi i Dansa and Horo, both for clarinet. He also writes extensively for orchestra, including concertos and symphonic poems, such as: La ciutat i les estrelles (Concertino for piano and orchestra, 1979), Diomira (1980), El lleó afamat (Preludes for orchestra, 1988) and First Concert for clarinet Orchestra (1989), all premiered by the Orquestra Ciutat de Barcelona (currently the OBC), from 1980 to 1989. In the nineties, there were the premieres of Simfonia Americana, commissioned by the Orquesta Nacional de España (ONE) at the Auditorio Nacional de Madrid, and Cadmos et Harmonie, for guitar and strings, premièred by Jordi Codina and the Orquestra de Cambra Catalana.

Later works include: the Second Simfonia, Anàbasi (1993), inspired by a poem written by the French poet Saint-John Perse, premiered by the OBC in 2000; L’Illa Misteriosa (a double concerto for alto saxophone, percussion and orchestra), premiered in 2007 by the Orquestra Julià Carbonell de les Terres de Lleida], conducted by Alfons Reverte; Fantasia sobre l'òpera "El Viatge de Marlow", premiered by the Orquestra de Càmara de la Filarmònica Checa at the Festival de Torroella de Montgrí in the summer of 2007; Quasi una Polka, commissioned by the Orquestra Simfònica de Sant Cugat, premiered in 2008; Concertino for Clarinet and Strings, premiered in 2009 by the Orquestra Nacional Clàssica d'Andorra at the Palau de la Música Catalana; and Danses d'Ibèria, premiered the same year by the OBC at L’Auditori de Barcelona, with Eiji Oue as the conductor and in honor of the centennial commemoration of the death of Isaac Albéniz.

Rodríguez Picó has also written chamber operas. El paradís de les muntanyes (1994), with text by Miquel Desclot, is based on the work of Alfred Jarry, and was premiered at the Teatre Lliure de Barcelona in 1998. Other operas include Hotel Occident, Urbs and Vera. In September 2008, the Menorcan baritone Lluís Sintes premiered in Japan his lieder cycle La flor del cirerer, on poems written by the singer himself.

He also wrote a book Xavier Benguerel, obra y estilo (Idea Books, 2000). In 1987, he worked on a project for the radio station Catalunya Música, where he worked as head of programming until December 1990.

== Some works ==
Orchestra:

- The City and the Stars
- Clarinet Concerto No. 1
- Clarinet Concerto No. 2
- The Hungry Lion
- Sinfonía Americana
- Sinfonía Anábasis
- Iberian Dances

Operas:

- El paradís de les muntanyes, libretto by Miquel Desclot based on the homonymous play by Alfred Jarry
- Hotel Occident, libretto by Lluïsa Cunillé
- Urbs, libretto by J. M. Batista
- Vera, libretto by Pau Guix based on the homonymous play by Oscar Wilde

== Sources ==
- Curriculum, Associació Catalana de Compositors
- Works in Clivis
- Jesús Rodríguez Picó, Enciclopèdia.cat
