= Ada Parellada i Garrell =

Spanish cook (born 1967)

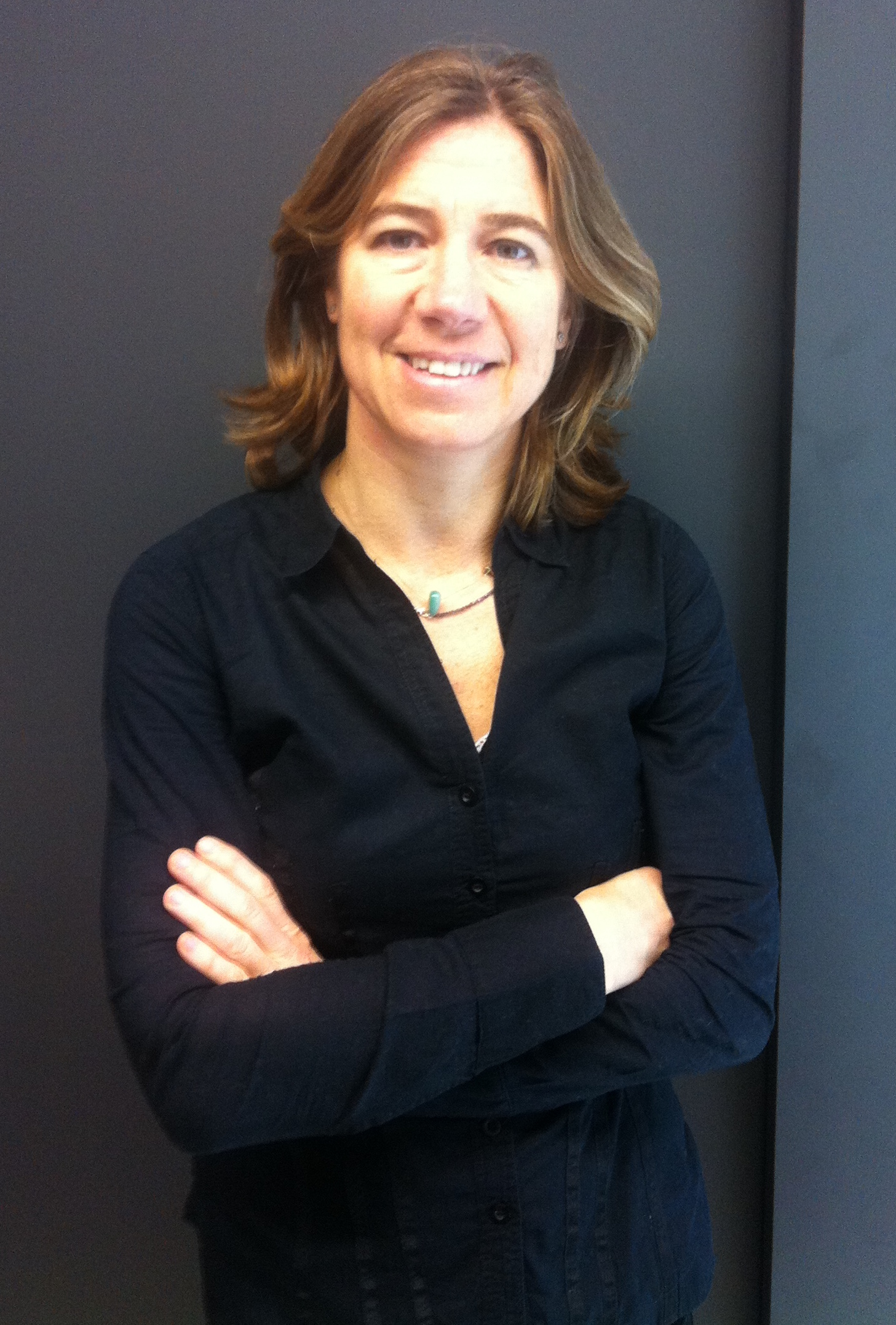
- Born: 26 February 1967 (age 59); Granollers
- Occupations: Chef, writer
- Known for: Cooking

Ada Parellada i Garrell (born 26 February 1967) is a Spanish cook who inspired the "Semproniana" restaurant in Barcelona. She owns three restaurants, publishes books and she has been given the Creu de Sant Jordi for her work in the food sector.

== List ==
Parellada was born in Granollers in 1967. Her whole family were interested in food from the restaurant founded by her ancestors in 1714. Her parents wanted her to have a profession so she studied law. She opened her first restaurant when she was 25 in 1993. Her wider family own a number of restaurants. She is very active in the media, in newspapers and television, and she runs workshops and publishes cookery books. She has also published a novel.

She stood as a political candidate in September 2015 as part of the "Together for Yes" campaign.

In 2016 she had three restaurants in Barcelona. She was awarded the Creu de Sant Jordi because of her work in restoration. Her restaurants are called Semproniana (her first one), Pla dels Àngels and Petra.
