= Societat de Beneficència de Naturals de Catalunya =

Charitable Society of the Natives from Catalonia
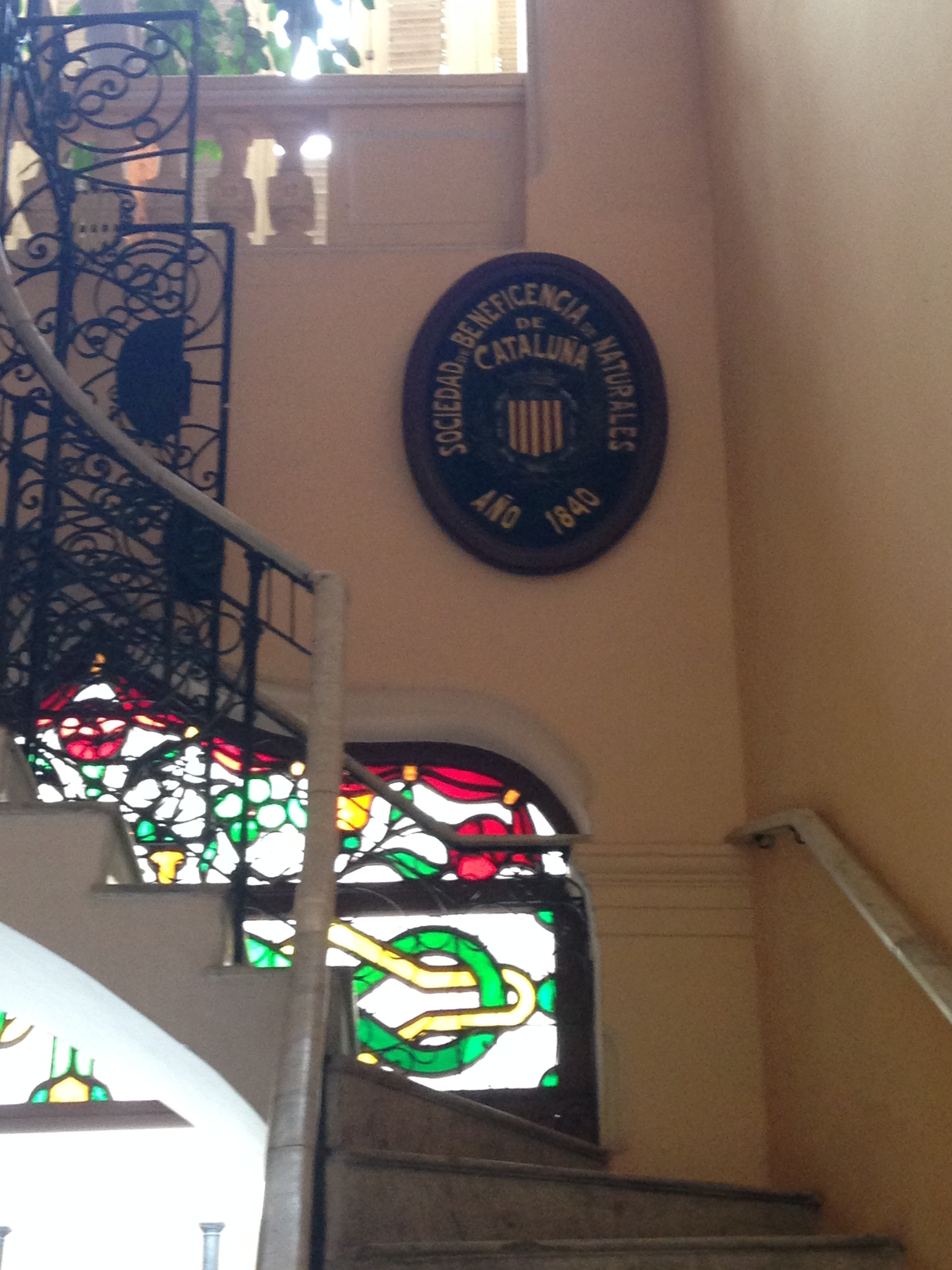
- Founded: 1840
- Type: NPO, social help, cultural institution
- Location(s): Consulado 68 La Havana Vieja, Cuba
- Region served: Cuba
- Members: 1,400

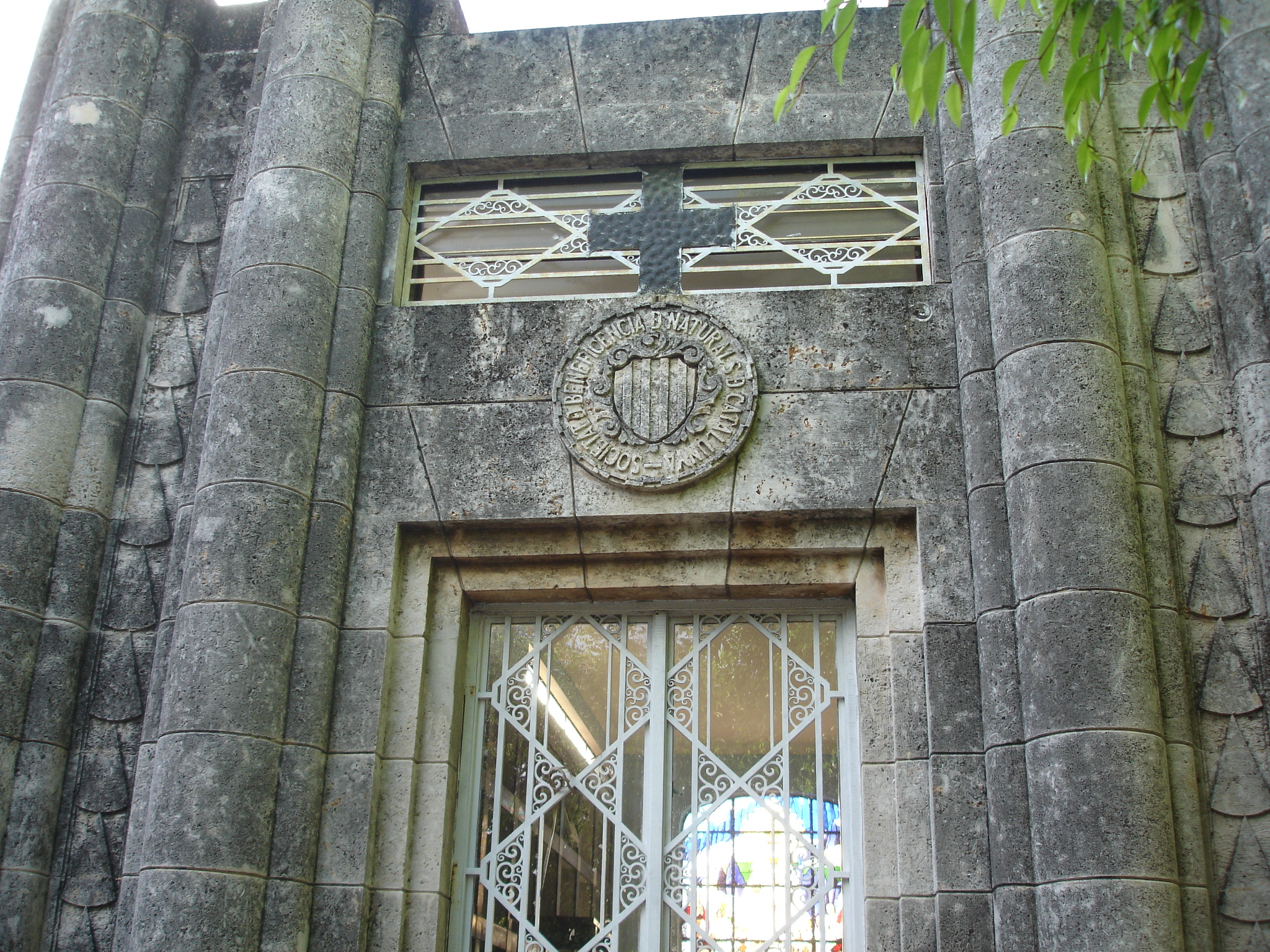
Pantheon of the Charitable Society of the Natives from Catalonia in the Cemetery of Colón of the Havana

The Charitable Society of the Natives from Catalonia (Catalan: Societat de Beneficència de Naturals de Catalunya), also known as the Casal Català or the Beneficencia Catalana, is a charity founded by Catalan immigrants in Havana, Cuba, in 1840.

== Overview ==
The society was founded by a group of 102 emigrants from Catalonia, led by Antoni Font and Josep Gener, in order to assist poor Catalan immigrants that found themselves stranded in the Cuban capital. The association began increasing its membership following the independence of Cuba in 1900. Members of the organization included José Murillo and Joaquim Muntal, who was vice-president of the society from 1925 to 1928.

The society's main activity is providing economic support to the members. Over time, however, the organization has expanded its mission to include the organization of cultural and festive activities relevant to Catalonians. With more than 1,400 partners, they promote various activities related to Catalonia, including habaneres, the celebration of Sant Jordi, esbart dansaire, puntaires, poetry readings, concerts and film screenings.

Another objective of the charitable society is the maintenance of the Monserrate hermitage, located near the Havana airport. The hermitage is a replica of the S'Agaró church and houses a replica of the Virgin of Montserrat.

With over 170 years of history, the association has a legacy of documenting the economic and social conditions of Catalan emigrants, and has received awards from the Institute of Catalan Studies, the Generality of Catalonia and the Cross of St.George 1993.

== List of presidents since 1841 ==
- Francesc Ventosa Soler (1841–1842)
- Salvador Samà i Martí (1844–1845)
- Francesc Ventosa Soler (1847–1848)
- Francesc Martí i Torrents (1851–1852)
- Joan Conill Pí (1860–1861)
- Jaume Partagàs i Ravell (1866–1867)
- Joan Veguer i Flaquer (1868–1869)
- Josep Gener i Batet (1975–1976)
- Prudenci Rabell i Pubill (1876–77)
- Narcís Gelats i Durall (1882–1883)
- Josep Gener i Batet (1883–1884)
- Prudenci Rabell i Pubill (1885–1886)
- Josep Gener i Batet (1886–1887)
- Sebastià Figueras i Blat (1891–1893)
- Prudenci Rabell i Pubill (1893–1894)
- Narcís Gelats i Durall (1917)
- Ramon J. Planiol Arcelos (1942–1949)
- Josep Tous Amill (1950–1955)
- Ramon J. Planiol Arcelos (1956–1971)
- Jorge Oller Oller (1999–2009)
- Maria Dolors Rosich Leal (2010-current)

== See also ==
- List of Creus de Sant Jordi (Catalonia)

== Bibliography ==
- La Beneficencia catalana de La Habana: 150 años de historia : 1840–1990 : Sociedad de Beneficencia de Naturales de Cataluña. Fòrum solidari. 1999.
- Rodríguez Ortega, Idania Ester (2010). De Cataluña a Cuba... ¡Hacer las Américas! (in Spanish). Grupo de Comunicación Galicia en el mundo.
- Carbonell i de Ballester, Jordi; Carreras i Marti, Joan. Gran Enciclopèdia Catalana (in Catalan). Enciclopèdia Catalana.
