= José de Udaeta =

Spanish dancer and choreographer

José Luis de Udaeta París (27 May 1919 in Barcelona, Spain – 14 September 2009 in Sant Feliu de Guixols) was a Spanish dancer, castanet player and choreographer. His first performances in classical and modern ballet were made under a pseudonym, being the root for his development as a dancer, choreographer, teacher and castanet virtuoso and author for more than 50 years.

== Awards ==
- 1987 Deutscher Tanzpreis
- 1989 Medalla de Bellas Artes
- 1995 Premi Nacional de Dansa de Catalunya
- 2000 Medalla de oro del mérit de les arts, Barcelona
- 2001 la Creu de Saint Jordi

== Notable published works ==
- La castañuela española. Orígenes y evolución (1989). ISBN 9788476280621
