= Narcís Sayrach i Fatjó dels Xiprers =

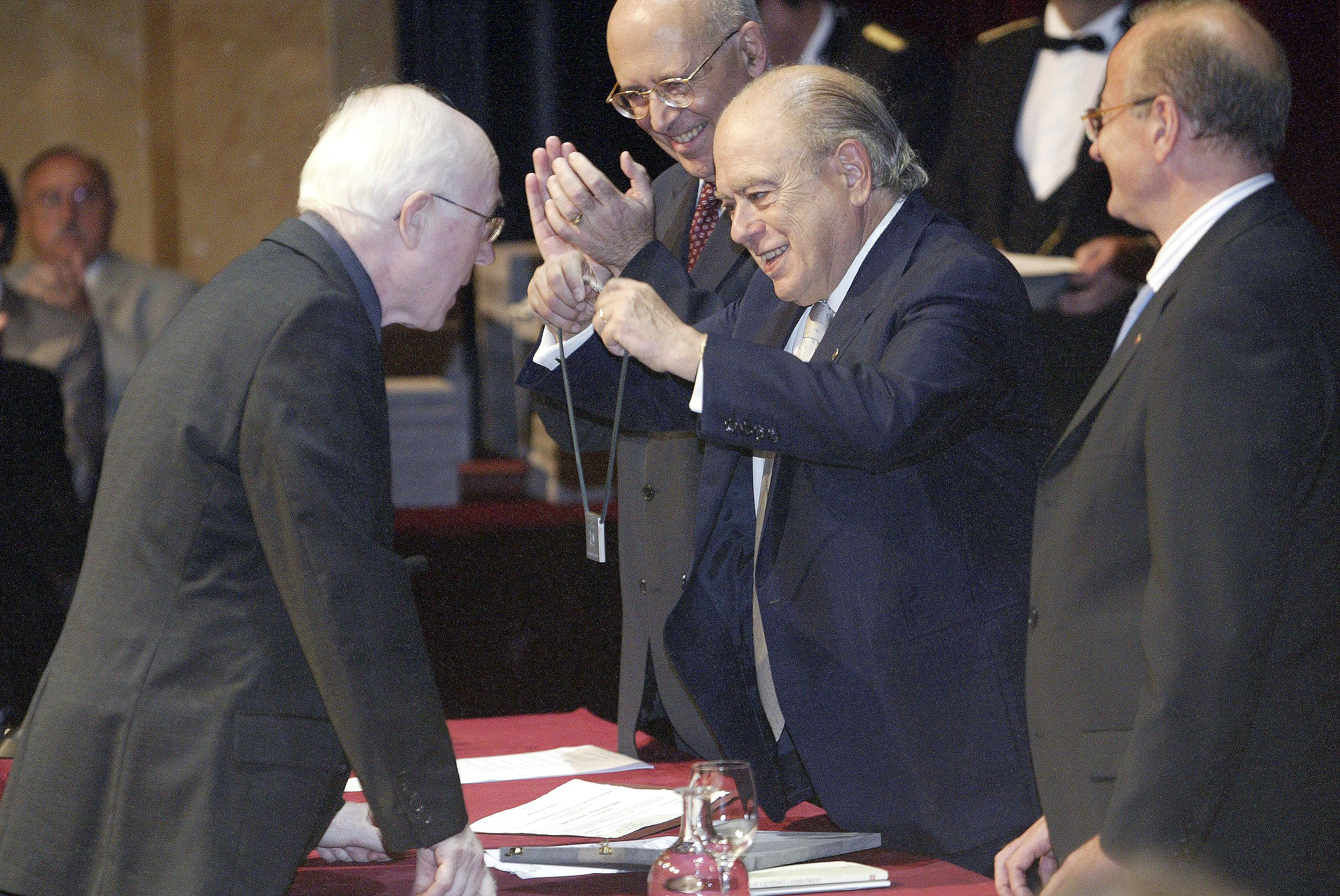
Picture of Narcís Sayrach

Narcís Sayrach i Fatjó dels Xiprers (1931 – 3 December 2016) was a Catalan historian, cultural promoter and civic activist.

== Biography ==
Narcís Sayrach i Fatjó dels Xiprers was born in Barcelona in 1931.

In 2003 he received the Creu de Sant Jordi "for his sustained contribution to the recovery of Catalonia from a social, cultural and linguistic points of view paying special attention to the most disadvantaged sectors". And, uniquely, for his outstanding work transmitting the figure of Saint George through various publications and initiatives such as the association of Amics de Sant Jordi, of which he is president. His personal collection, made by diverse graphical artwork referred to the figure of “ Sant Jordi” is preserved in Biblioteca de Catalunya.

Xiprers died on 3 December 2016.

== Published books ==
- Narcís Sayrach i Fatjó dels Xiprers (1996). El patró Sant Jordi : història, llegenda, art. Barcelona: Generalitat de Catalunya, Departament de la Presidència, Entitat Autónoma del Diari Oficial i de Publicacions. ISBN 9788439338376.
- Narcís Sayrach & Pilarín Bayés (1997). Petita història de Sant Jordi. Barcelona: Mediterrània. ISBN 9788489622449.
- Narcís Sayrach (2006). Quan tot estava per fer : Les Roquetes de Garraf. Barcelona: Mediterrània. ISBN 9788483347911.
