= Carles Duarte i Montserrat =

Catalan poet, linguist and politician

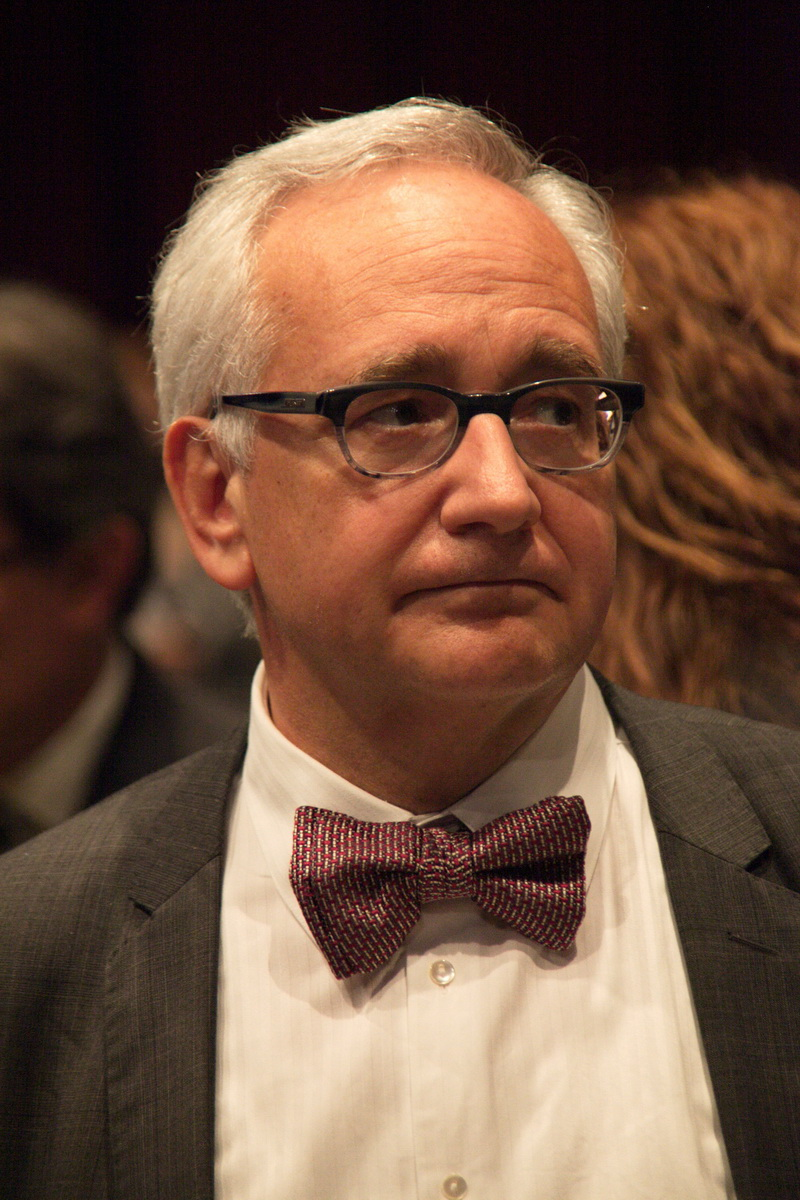

Carles Duarte i Montserrat (Barcelona, September 16, 1959) is a Catalan poet, linguist and politician, brother of the historian Àngel Duarte Montserrat.

== Biography ==
During his time at the University of Barcelona, he stood out for his concerns focused on the field of linguistics and poetry. He began writing poetry in Spanish in September 1973 following the coup d'état in Chile and the death of President Salvador Allende and Pablo Neruda. After a couple of years he started writing in Catalan and with a group of friends they started the literary magazine Maig in 1979. Seven issues were published, where the first poems in Catalan that he made known appeared, some of which would end up being integrated into his book Vida endins.

In 1981 he obtained his degree in Catalan philology and, finally, stood out in 1984 by presenting a thesis in which he carefully studied the legal vocabulary of the Book of Customs of Tortosa.

During the period 1978–1981 he was secretary of the Catalan Language Courses and of the Sociolinguistic Commission at the University of Barcelona. In 1979, under a study carried out jointly with Professor Antoni M. Badia and Margarit, he published his first work entitled Administrative form: applied especially to the University, consisting of a study on the establishment of administrative language. His dedication to linguistics continued with the book Synthesis of the history of the Catalan language in 1981, prepared together with Maria Àngels Massip i Bonet. That same year, Carles Duarte will enter the Public Administration School of Catalonia, where he will work until 1989.

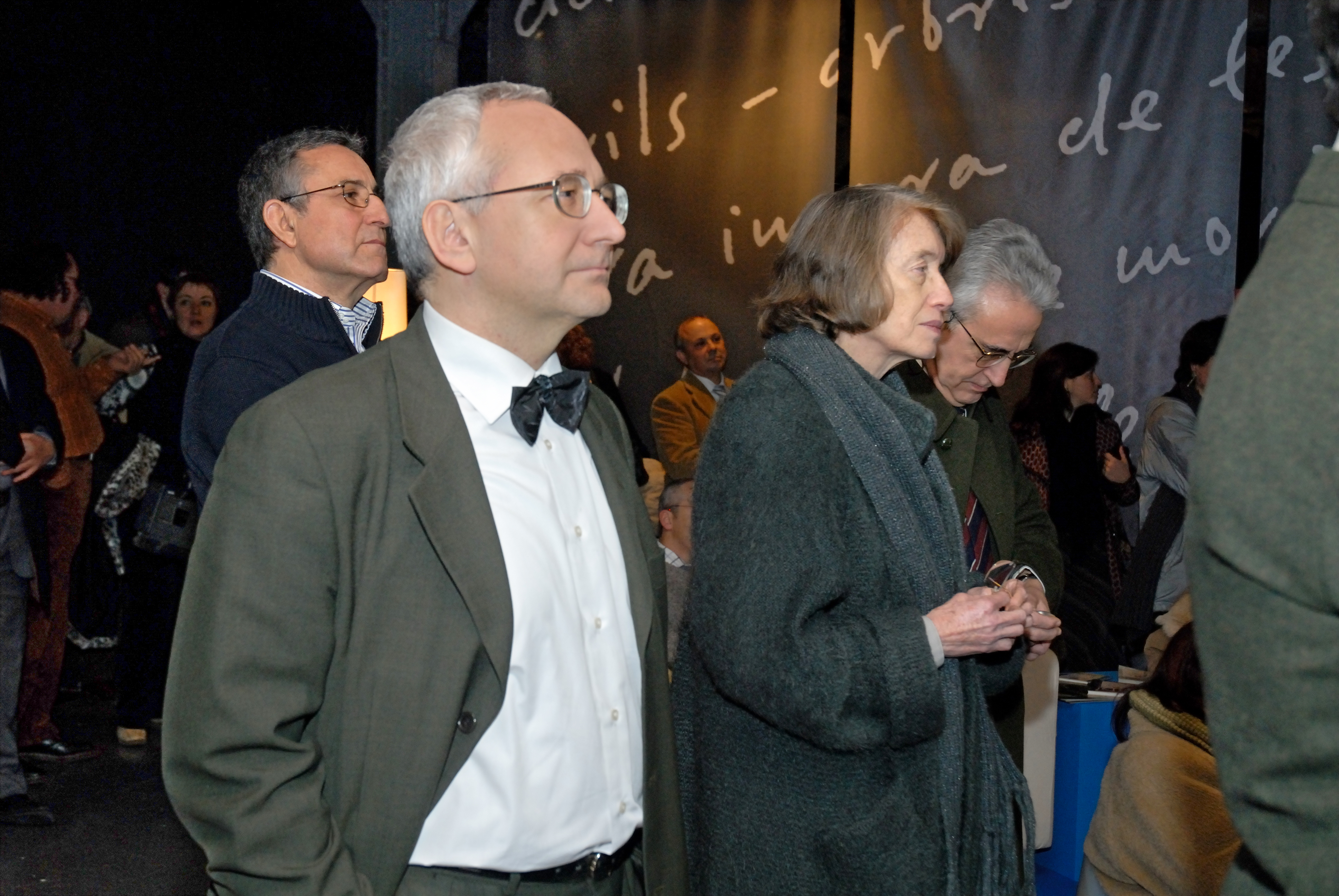
Carles Duarte at the MHC in 2006.

One of the most outstanding events in his biography will be the professional and friendly relationship he will maintain with professor Joan Coromines, especially between the years 1979 and 1989, where he will actively collaborate with this professor for the preparation of his etymological and complementary Dictionary of the Catalan language. Although his poetic facet had been bubbling up intimately for a long time, Duarte y Montserrat did not express it publicly until the publication of his first book of poetry, Vida endins, at Editorial Moll in 1984, when he was 25 years old.

Between 1983 and 1989 he was president of the Catalonia Foundation, created by Joaquim Fons. Subsequently, he has worked in different positions, among others: head of the Linguistic Advisory Service, deputy general director of Adult Training, head of the Institutional Image area, general director of Diffusion and member of the Permanent Board of Catalan and the Administrative Language Advisory Commission. He has been vice-president for the Principality of Catalonia on the Board of the Association of Writers in the Catalan Language; as well as, between 1995 and 2007, he assumed the presidency of the Blanes Recvll Awards while, at the same time, he has not stopped collaborating as a jury in numerous poetry awards throughout the Catalan territory.

Within the social and political sphere he was Secretary General of the Presidency of the Generalitat of Catalonia during the last government of Jordi Pujol (1999–2003) with Convergència i Unió. He was also the Vice-President of the Universal Forum of Cultures Barcelona 2004 and honorary patron of the Universal Forum of Cultures Foundation.

In 1983 he founded with others the Journal of Language and Law, becoming its director until April 2003. And he is currently part of the editorial board of this publication. He regularly collaborates in newspapers such as El Punt Avui, El Periódico de Catalunya, Segre, Diari de Girona, Regió 7 and El 9 Nou, and in radio programs such as L'oracle de Catalunya Ràdio. He has been a professor of specialist languages and communication at several universities in Catalonia, the Valencian Country, the Balearic Islands and Italy.

He was part of the board of the Ateneu Barcelonès between 1998 and 2003, under the presidency of Jordi Sarsanedas i Vives. In 2014 he became part of the Social Council of this entity.

He is currently the general director of the Cultural Institution of the CIC and is a member of the Board of the Barcelonesa Economic Society of Friends of the Country. Between July 2012 and August 2019 I chaired the National Council for Culture and the Arts (CoNCA). He also directed the Lluís Carulla Foundation until 2016, and was secretary of the Circle of the Museum of the History of the City of Barcelona and patron of the Amics del MNAC foundation. Since December 2011 he has been part of the Cultural Council of the city of Barcelona. L'Ajuntament aprova els noms dels nous membres del ple del Consell de la Cultura de Barcelona | ACN | Barcelona | Cultura | El Punt Avui in 2007 he received the Cross of Sant Jordi.

== Work ==
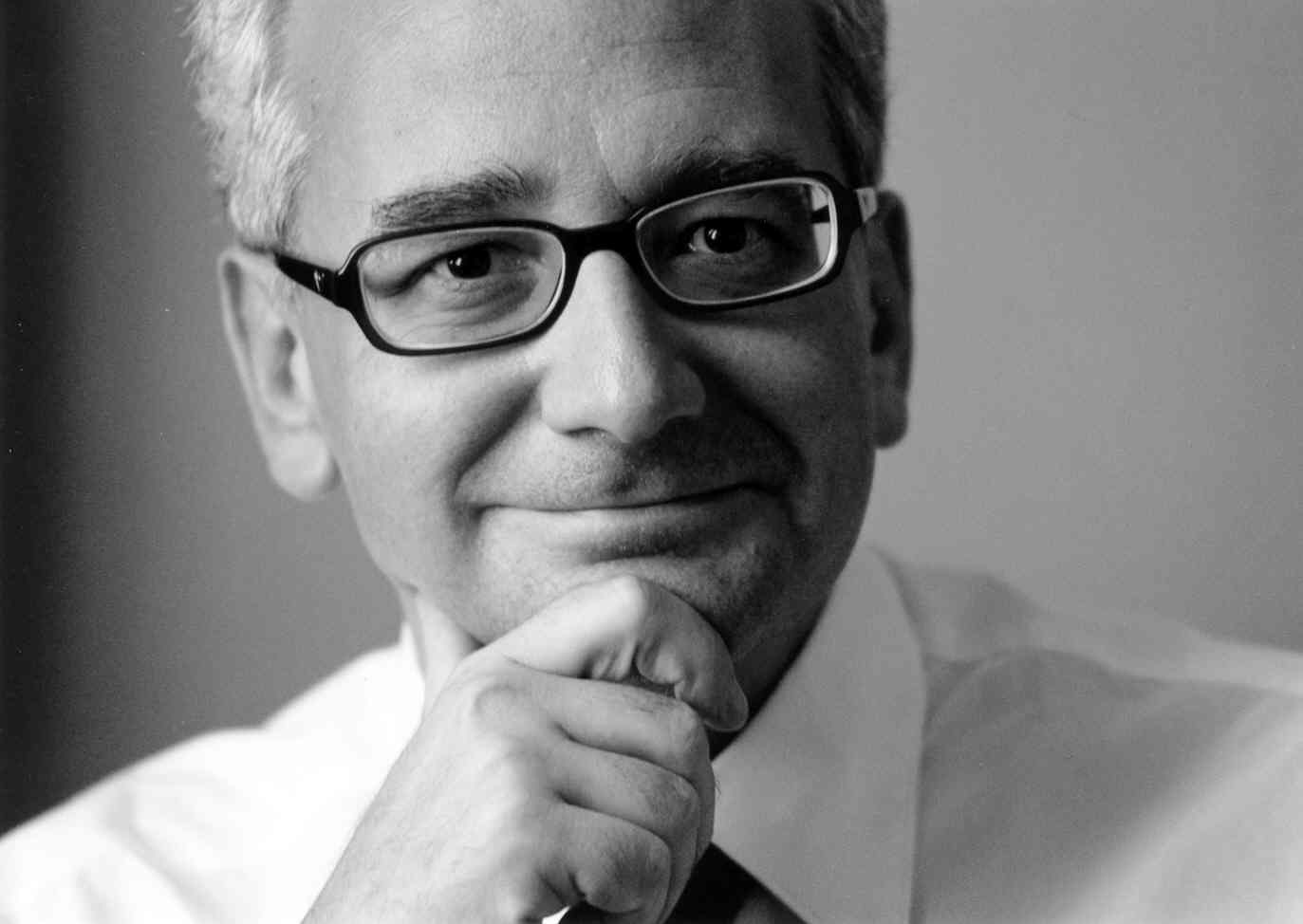
Carles Duarte i Montserrat in 2011

As a writer, he has been included in volume IV of the Anthology of Catalan poets by professors Martí de Riquer, Giuseppe Grilli and Giuseppe Sansone, in the anthology Non à la guerre, published in France with the poet Lionel Ray as literary manager, and the current Catalan poetry Anthology published in Buenos Aires by Alberto José Miyara; a Paraula encesa, an anthology of Catalan poetry from the last hundred years, edited by Pere Ballart and Jordi Julià, in Thirty-four Catalan poets for the XXI century, by Emilio Coco, in the anthology Poeti spagnoli contemporanei, also edited by Emilio Coco, ia 20 of the XX. Catalan poets, published in 2013 by Jordi Virallonga in Monterrey (Mexico). He has participated in the Barcelona International Poetry Festival (1998) and has read poems in Catalonia, Reykjavik, Melbourne, Paris, Bordeaux, Buenos Aires, Rosario, Rome, Verona, Alghero, Neptú (Romania), Madrid, Murcia, Zaragoza.. . He has prefaced and presented books by various authors.

=== Poetry ===
He self-defines his style as "a poetry that seeks the breath of a bare music, tends to the clear rhythm of what is essential, to expressive purification. The landscape and cultural references of the Mediterranean are constantly present. And it has as its central themes tenderness (skin, desire, knowledge through touch,...), sleep (as the engine of existence, as a subjective and personal reading of what happens, as a territory where creativity moves more freely,...) and oblivion (as the extinction of memory, as an incessant horizon that devours everything that exists,...)".

- Responsabilitat lingüística d'obres traduïdes (Linguistic responsibility for translated works).
- Retrats de mars d'Hélène Dorion (Sea portraits of Hélène Dorion), Barcelona, La Magrana, 2000, 120 pages.
- Arcilla y aliento. Anthology 1983–2001 by Hélène Dorion [translation into Castilian, in collaboration with José Ramón Trujillo], TDR – SIAL, 2001.
- Después de todo by Miquel Martí Pol, international poetry prize Laureà Mela 2002 (translation into Castilian, in collaboration with Emili Suriñach), DVD, 2002, 96 pages.
- Orígenes d'Hélène Dorion [Castilian translation], Pen Press, 2003.
- Un rostre recolzat contra el món d'Hélène Dorion (A face leaning against the world of Hélène Dorion), Lerida, Pagès, 2003.
- Sense límit, sense final del món (Without limit, without ending of the world) by Hélène Dorion, «Reduccions», 78.
- You are poemas d'Hélène Dorion [translation into Castilian with José Ramón Trujillo], «Arena», cultural supplement of «Excelsior», year 7, volume 7, number 323, Mexico, April 30, 2005.
- Atrapar: los lugares [poems by Hélène Dorion translated into Castilian], «Galerna – international literature review», vol. III, Montclair State University, 2005.
- Poemas, de Màrius Sampere, «Fractal», 28, Mexico, pp. 55–64.
- Dialogue with God and other poems by Bejan Matur, New York, Letter Press Broadsides, Poetry Series, 17, 2006.
- L'histoire est finie (Sonnet disparaissant) [La història s'ha acabat (Sonet que desapareix)] by Jean Portante, «Reduccions», 85, 2006, p. 84-99.
- Poetry, de Jordi de Sant Jordi, Barcellona, Barcino, Tast de clàssics, 1, 2011.
- Atrapar: els llocs, d'Hélène Dorion [translation from French with Lluna Llecha], Lerida, Pagès, 2011.
- [translation from Portuguese with Mireia Vidal-Conte], Girona, Curbet, 2012.
- Ponente on the edge. Selected poems, edited by Giuseppe E. Sansone, Novara, Interlinea edizioni, 2002

=== Novels ===
- Somnis (Sonni), Barcelona, Columna, 1994.
- Cèrcols de llum (Circles of light), Les Gunyoles d'Avinyonet, Vilatana, 1999.
- Ulls encendrats (Ashen eyes), Valencia, 3i4, 2005.
- You'll see a whole bunch of mint. Retalls de mòria, Barcelona, Montserrat Abbey Publications, 2008.

=== Translations made ===
- Responsabilitat lingüística d'obres traduïdes (Linguistic responsibility for translated works).
- Retrats de mars d'Hélène Dorion (Sea portraits of Hélène Dorion), Barcelona, La Magrana, 2000, 120 pages.
- Arcilla y aliento. Anthology 1983–2001 by Hélène Dorion [translation into Castilian, in collaboration with José Ramón Trujillo], TDR – SIAL, 2001.
- Después de todo by Miquel Martí Pol, international poetry prize Laureà Mela 2002 (translation into Castilian, in collaboration with Emili Suriñach), DVD, 2002, 96 pages.
- Orígenes d'Hélène Dorion [Castilian translation], Pen Press, 2003.
- Un rostre recolzat contra el món d'Hélène Dorion (A face leaning against the world of Hélène Dorion), Lerida, Pagès, 2003.
- Sense límit, sense final del món (Without limit, without ending of the world) by Hélène Dorion, «Reduccions», 78.
- You are poemas d'Hélène Dorion [translation into Castilian with José Ramón Trujillo], «Arena», cultural supplement of «Excelsior», year 7, volume 7, number 323, Mexico, April 30, 2005.
- Atrapar: los lugares [poems by Hélène Dorion translated into Castilian], «Galerna – international literature review», vol. III, Montclair State University, 2005.
- Poemas, de Màrius Sampere, «Fractal», 28, Mexico, pp. 55–64.
- Dialogue with God and other poems by Bejan Matur, New York, Letter Press Broadsides, Poetry Series, 17, 2006.
- L'histoire est finie (Sonnet disparaissant) [La història s'ha acabat (Sonet que desapareix)] by Jean Portante, «Reduccions», 85, 2006, p. 84-99.
- Poetry, de Jordi de Sant Jordi, Barcellona, Barcino, Tast de clàssics, 1, 2011.
- Atrapar: els llocs, d'Hélène Dorion [translation from French with Lluna Llecha], Lerida, Pagès, 2011.
- [translation from Portuguese with Mireia Vidal-Conte], Girona, Curbet, 2012.
- Ponente on the edge. Selected poems, edited by Giuseppe E. Sansone, Novara, Interlinea edizioni, 2002

== Awards and recognitions ==
Carles Duarte has received the following awards:

- Cadaqués Award to Rosa Leveroni (1995): Cohèlet .
- Vila de Martorell Award (1996): Ben Sira.
- European Citizen Award (December 2002), awarded by Foro Europe 2001.
- Chevalier des arts et des lettres of the "French Republic".
- Critic's Serra d'Or prize for poetry (2004) for El center del temps .
- FIEC Award (International Federation of Catalan Entities) (2004).
- APPEC Award (Association of Periodical Publications in Catalan) (2004).
- Saint George's Cross (2007)
- Prize of the Regional Press Association (ACPC), (2012).
- El Vallenc National Award (2013): for his cultural career.
- Ramon Fuster Award (2014), awarded by the Official College of Doctors and Bachelors in Philosophy and Letters and Sciences of Catalonia : for his civic, cultural and literary career.
- Prize of the Catalan Poetry Critic (2014): Alba del vespre .

== Bibliography ==
- Ahumada, Laia de, Spiritual without religion, Fragmenta Editorial, Barcelona, 2015. (Interview with Lídia Pujol, pp. 51 et seq.). ISBN 978-84-15518-15-0
