= Manuel Cabero =

Spanish choral director (1926–2022)

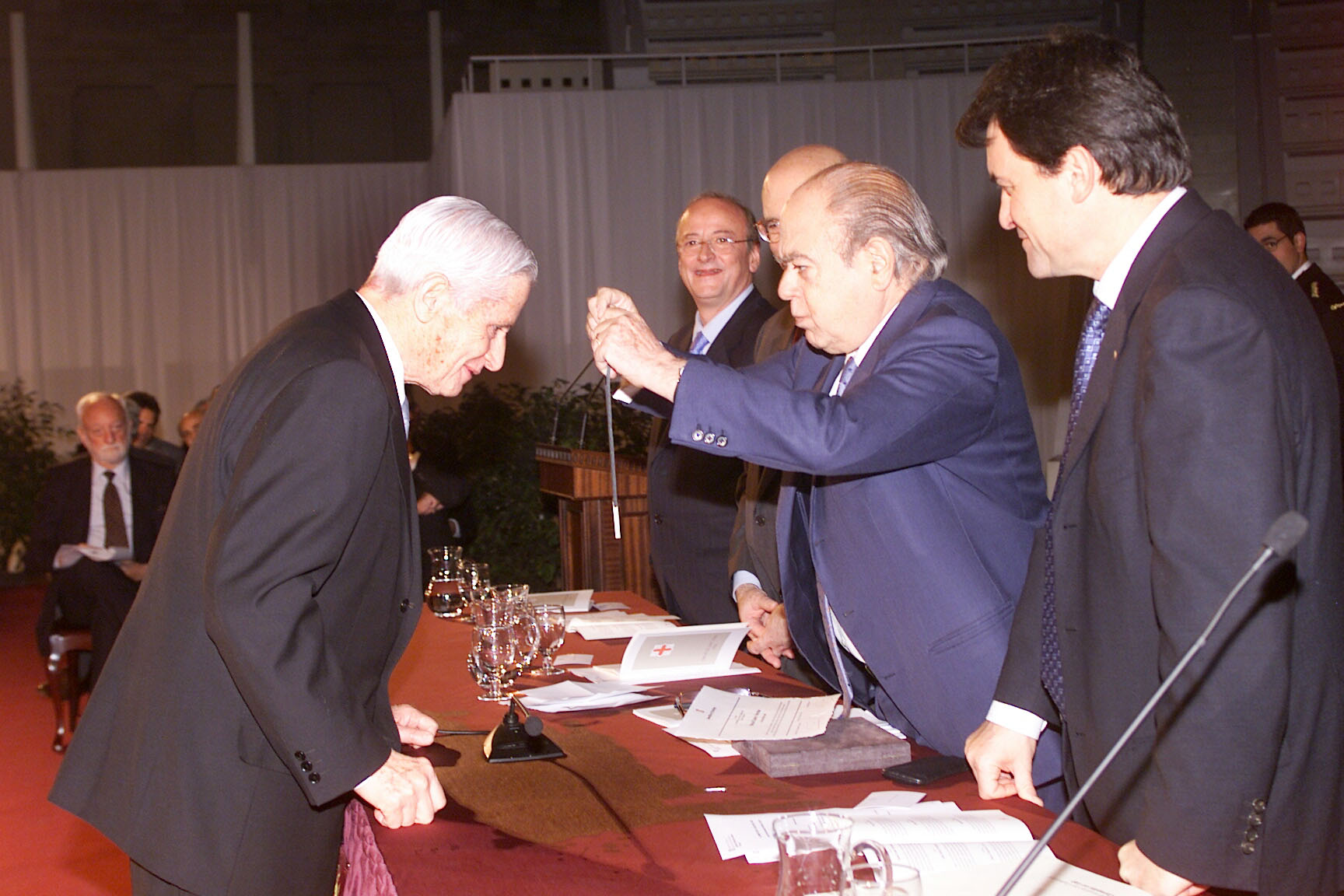
- Born: February 9, 1926; Barcelona, Spain
- Died: January 16, 2022 (aged 95)
- Education: Municipal Conservatory of Barcelona
- Style: Sardana
- Awards: Creu de Sant Jordi (2002)

Manuel Cabero i Vernedas (February 9, 1926 – January 16, 2022) was a Catalan choral director. He studied at the Municipal Conservatory of Barcelona.

== Biography ==
In 1951 he founded the Madrigal Choir, which he directed until 1991, through which he introduced many contemporary Catalan works and international historical polyphony, in addition to repeatedly performing great productions of the symphonic-choral repertoire.

As a pedagogue of choral conducting, his intensive and ongoing courses at the AUDICOR (Choral Conducting Classroom) of the Joan Llongueres Institute in Barcelona should be noted. He has also taught numerous conducting courses in Asturias, Cantabria, Cádiz, Galicia, Basque Country, Las Palmas, Cervera, Lleida (International Music Courses of the Orfeó Lleidatà), Palma and other countries. There are also numerous choral formations with which he collaborated as guest director.

He married Montserrat Pueyo Bertran, singer, singing teacher and speech therapist. In 2002 he received the Cross of Sant Jordi.

His son Manel Cabero i Pueyo died on August 17, 2022, and Tenerife who was the adoptive father of Dalas Review who lamented his death denouncing repeated medical negligence on the part of the hospital that tormented him until death just retired.
