= Lluis Torner =

Catalan physicist

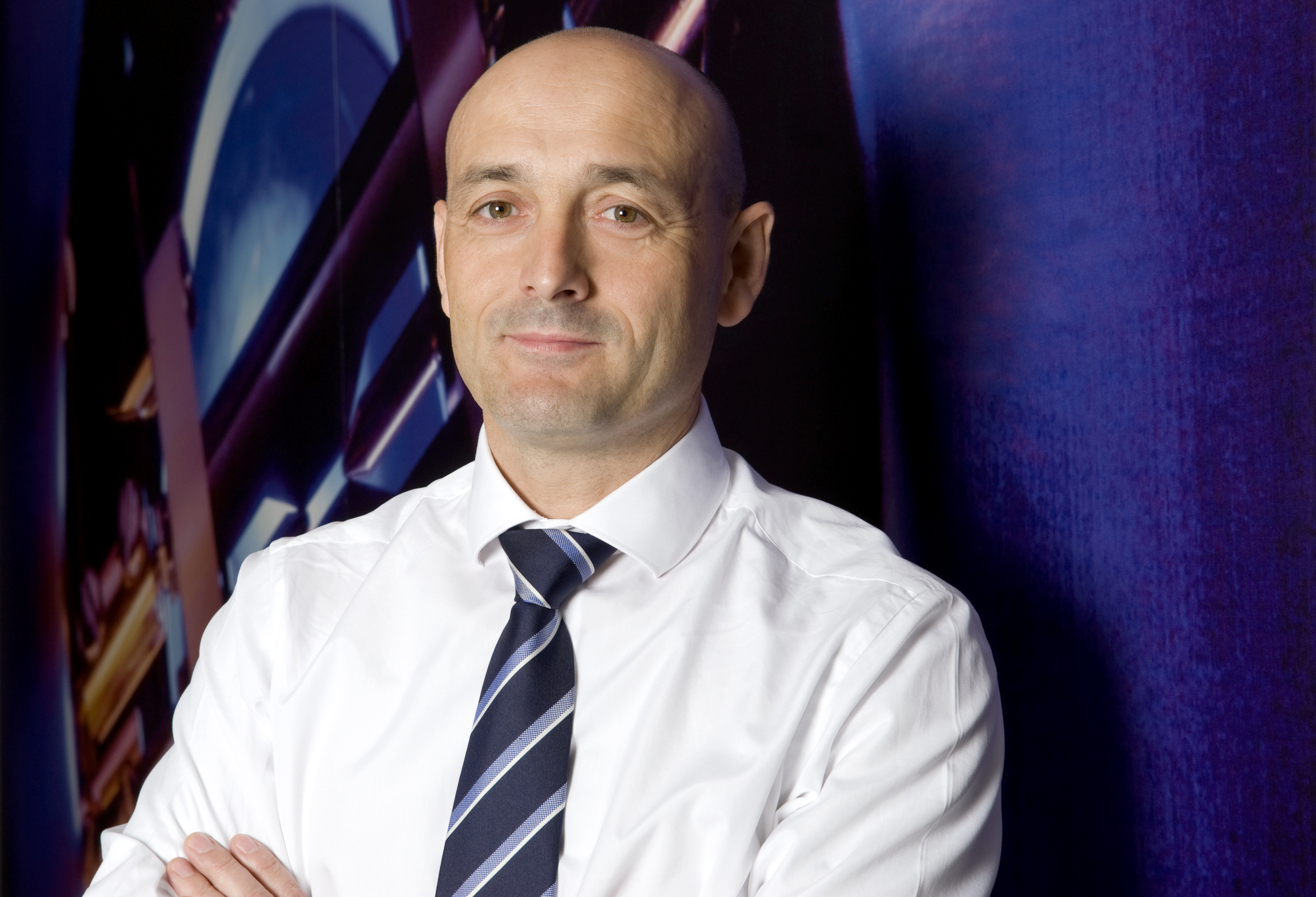
- Born: 1961 (age 64–65)
- Education: Autonomous University of Barcelona; Polytechnic University of Catalonia
- Scientific career
- Fields: Optics
- Workplaces: ICFO; Polytechnic University of Catalonia; CREOL

Lluis Torner i Sabata (born 1961) is a Spanish physicist. He founded and lead ICFO from 2002 to 2024 in Barcelona, Catalonia (Spain). He is the recipient of the Leadership Award of the Optical Society of America, the Monturiol Medal, Gold Medal of the City of Barcelona, the Creu de Sant Jordi of the Government of Catalonia and the 2016 National Research prize of Catalonia.

== Career ==
Lluis Torner received his PhD at the Polytechnic University of Catalonia (UPC) in 1989 after completing a five-year degree in physics at the Autonomous University of Barcelona, both in Spain. Subsequently, he enjoyed post-doctoral appointments at CREOL of the University of Central Florida. He has been Full Professor at Barcelona Tech since the year 2000.

He works in nonlinear optics and its applications, with emphasis on optical solitons. His most cited research contributions are in the areas of light guiding and trapping, optical solitons, light's orbital angular momentum, and twisted photons.

Torner has been elevated to Fellow of the European Physical Society, the European Optical Society and the Optical Society of America (currently Optica). He is also a member of the Reial Academia de Ciències i Arts de Barcelona (RACAB), the Institut d'Estudis Catalans (IEC) and the Real Academia de Ciencias Exactas, Físicas y Naturales de España (RAC).

== Awards ==
- Medalla Monturiol (2009).
- Leadership Award Optical Society of America (2011).
- Optoel Award (2011).
- Ambaixador Regio7 Award (2012).
- Premi Nacional de la Generalitat de Catalunya (2016)
- Salvà-i-Campillo Personalitat Destacada Prize (2017).
- Nature Mentoring Award (2017).
- Creu de Sant Jordi Award (2022).
- GoldTalk CINBIO Award (2023).
- Gran Margallo Award (2023).
- Gold Medal of the City of Barcelona (2023).
- Talent d'Honor Fundació Impulsa Award (2024).
- AMETIC Award (2024).
