= Josep Maria Puig Doria =

Spanish jeweler

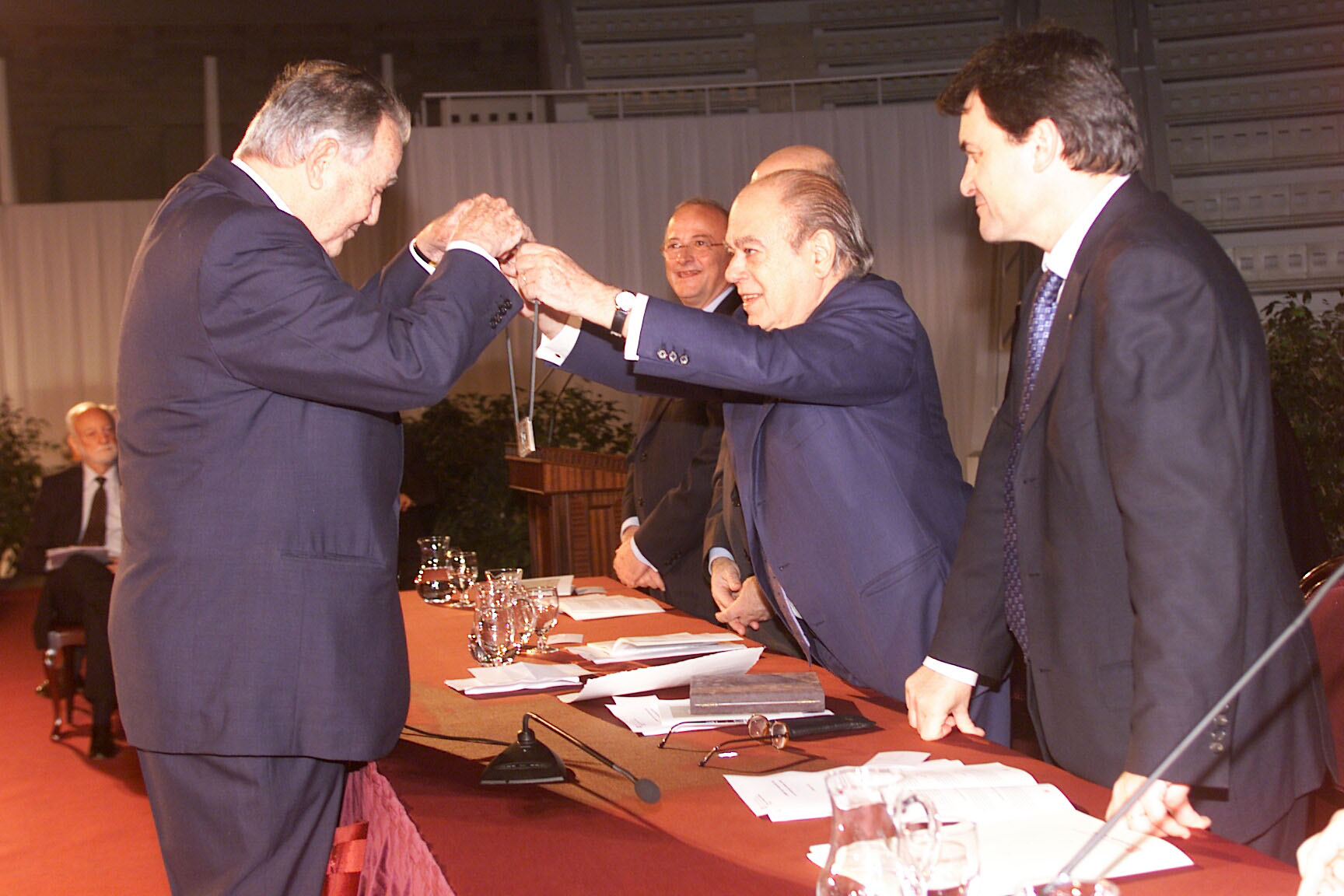
Puig Doria receives the Creu de Sant Jordi Award from Jordi Pujol in 2002.

Josep Maria Puig Doria (died 2006) was a Spanish jeweler. He received the Creu de Sant Jordi Award from Jordi Pujol in 2002.
