= Joana Biarnés =

Spanish photographer and photojournalist (1935–2018)

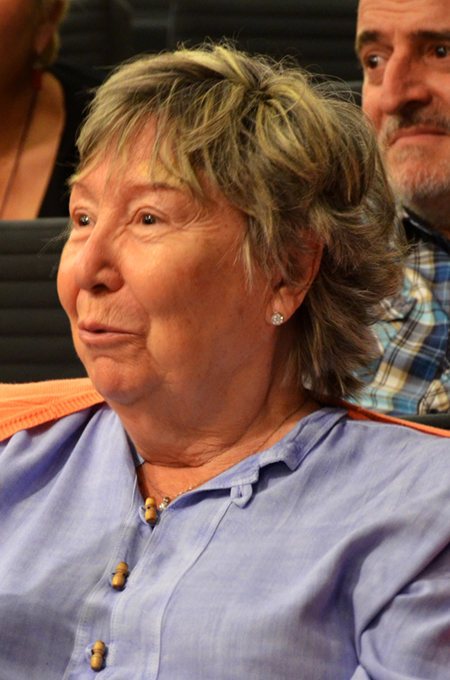
- Joana Biarnés
- Born: 1935; Terrassa (Spain)
- Died: 2018; Barcelona
- Occupation(s): photographer and photojournalist
- Known for: 1st Spanish photojournalist woman

Joana Biarnés (Terrassa, 1935–2018) was a Spanish photographer and photojournalist of Catalan descent. She is considered Spanish' first woman photojournalist.

Biarnés' work was presented in exhibitions and festivals. Her work was chronicled in the book Disparant amb el cor (Shooting from the Heart).

== Career ==
In 1962, she did a job in Barcelona for the newspaper Pueblo. Known for her determination, she often went to great lengths to capture the story she sought. She also covered numerous significant social events of her era. While working in Madrid, she met French journalist Jean Michel Bamberger, producer of Alberto Oliveras's program Ustedes son formidables, whom she married shortly thereafter.

She notably photographed The Beatles during their stay in Spain in 1965. In Barcelona, she evaded hotel security by using the service elevator at the Avenida Palace Hotel and knocked on their suite's door to request additional photographs. She spent three hours with the band, capturing an extraordinary photo reportage.

For many years, she served as photographer to singer Raphael, documenting other prominent figures such as Sara Montiel, the Duchess of Alba, Sammy Davis Jr., Sebastián Palomo Linares, Lola Flores, Audrey Hepburn, Tom Jones, El Cordobés, and Joan Manuel Serrat. She once accompanied Massiel, and on another occasion, she traveled to Paris and interviewed Salvador Dalí, asking him to paint the number he believed would win the Christmas lottery. Dalí initially painted 60477, a number later deemed invalid by her editors. She also cleverly gained access to Salvador Dalí again, capturing his revised prediction.

She undertook creative measures to photograph personalities, including posing as Antonio's secretary to access dancer Rudolf Nureyev and as part of the entourage of journalist Alberto Oliveras to reach other celebrities.

At the newspaper Pueblo, she curated a fashion page similar to magazines like Vogue and Elle. Later, she joined Raphael’s team, and subsequently, Luis María Anson recruited her. Eventually, disillusioned with the tabloid trend taking over journalism, she left her profession. Subsequently, she opened Cana Joana restaurant in Ibiza, regarded as one of the best in the Balearic Islands, and even appeared in Elena Santonja's cooking program, "Con las manos en la masa." Eventually, she closed her restaurant and retired.

Around 2001, she was diagnosed with degenerative maculopathy, significantly diminishing her vision, and by 2016, she retained only 30% of her sight.

In December 2016, her extensive photographic archive was showcased through 90 select images at Palau, offering an intimate glimpse into post-Civil War Spain.

She died after dealing with progressive vision loss but left a legacy celebrated through numerous exhibitions and her book of photography documenting post-civil war Spain.

== Exhibitions ==
- "Viatge a un arxiu. Crònica fotogràfica de la descoberta de Joana Biarnés 2015–2019" (A Voyage into an Archive: Photographic Chronicles of the Discovery of Joana Biarnés 2015–2019) Palau Robert, Barcelona.

== Bibliography ==
- Biarnés, Joana (2017). Joana Biarnés: disparanando con el corazón (Primera edición en lengua española ed.). Barcelona: Blume. ISBN 978-84-17056-08-7.
