= Margarida Aritzeta i Abad =

Spanish writer (born 1953)

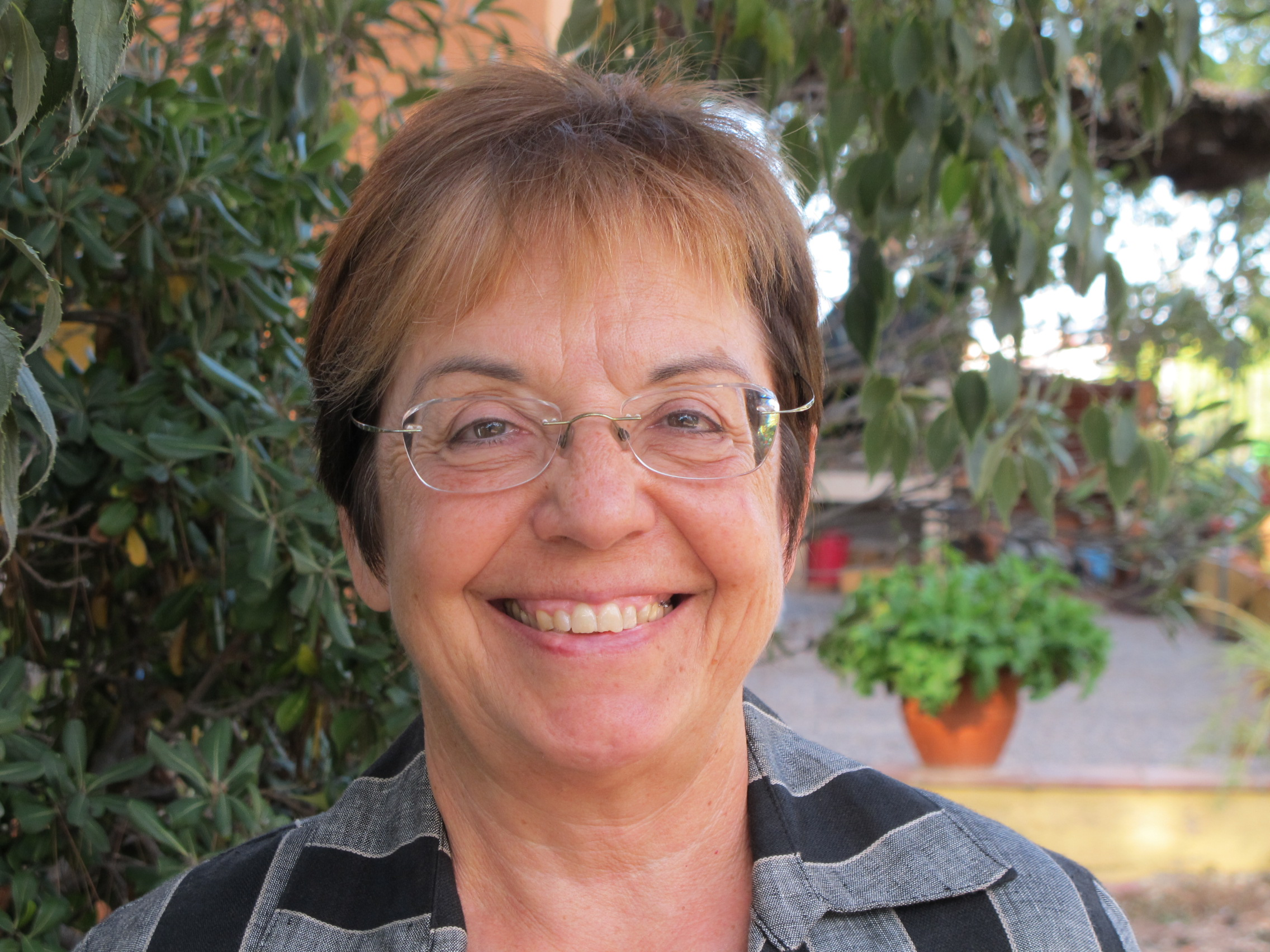
Aritzeta in 2013

Margarida Aritzeta i Abad (born July 20, 1953) is a Spanish Catalan writer and was a professor of literary theory and comparative literature at the University Rovira i Virgili, in Tarragona, until September 2018.

== Early life and education ==
She was born in Valls (Alt Camp), where she resides after studying and living for a time in Barcelona. During the years of her training, she took three courses in Fine Arts at the Sant Jordi School in Barcelona (currently the Faculty of Fine Arts), which she initially combined with her studies in philosophy and literature at the University of Barcelona, until she left the study of Fine Arts.

== Career ==
She has been a member of the Ofèlia Dracs literary group since 1983, just as the group was preparing the edition of Negra i consentida (1983).

She has published short stories with Ofelia Dracs in the volumes Essa efa (1985), Boccato di cardinali (1985) and Misteri de reina (1994), and was part of it until the group stopped meeting after the deaths of Joaquim Soler and Jaume Fuster.

She is a teacher, with a degree in modern history and a doctorate in Catalan philology from the University of Barcelona, where she completed her doctorate with a thesis on the poet and critic Josep Lleonart.

Between 2006 and 2010, she was part of the government of the Generalitat de Catalunya as Director General of Departmental Action of the Department of the Vice-Presidency and from that post she promoted various projects, such as the creation of the government's committee for historical and cultural commemorations, the representation of the Generalitat in Alghero, and the Eurodistricte de l'Espai Català Transfronterer, a project led by the house of the Generalitat de Catalunya in Perpignan.

== Awards and recognitions ==
- Premi Víctor Català de contes i narracions for Quan la pedra es torna fang a les mans (1980)
- Finalist in the Premi Joaquim Ruyra in 1981 for Grafèmia (1982)
- Premi Sant Joan de Novel·la for Un febrer a la pell (1983)
- Premi Barcanova Child Literature 2013 for El vol de la papallona
- Creu de Sant Jordi (2018)
