= Mercè Boada Rovira =

Catalan neurologist

Mercé Boada Rovira
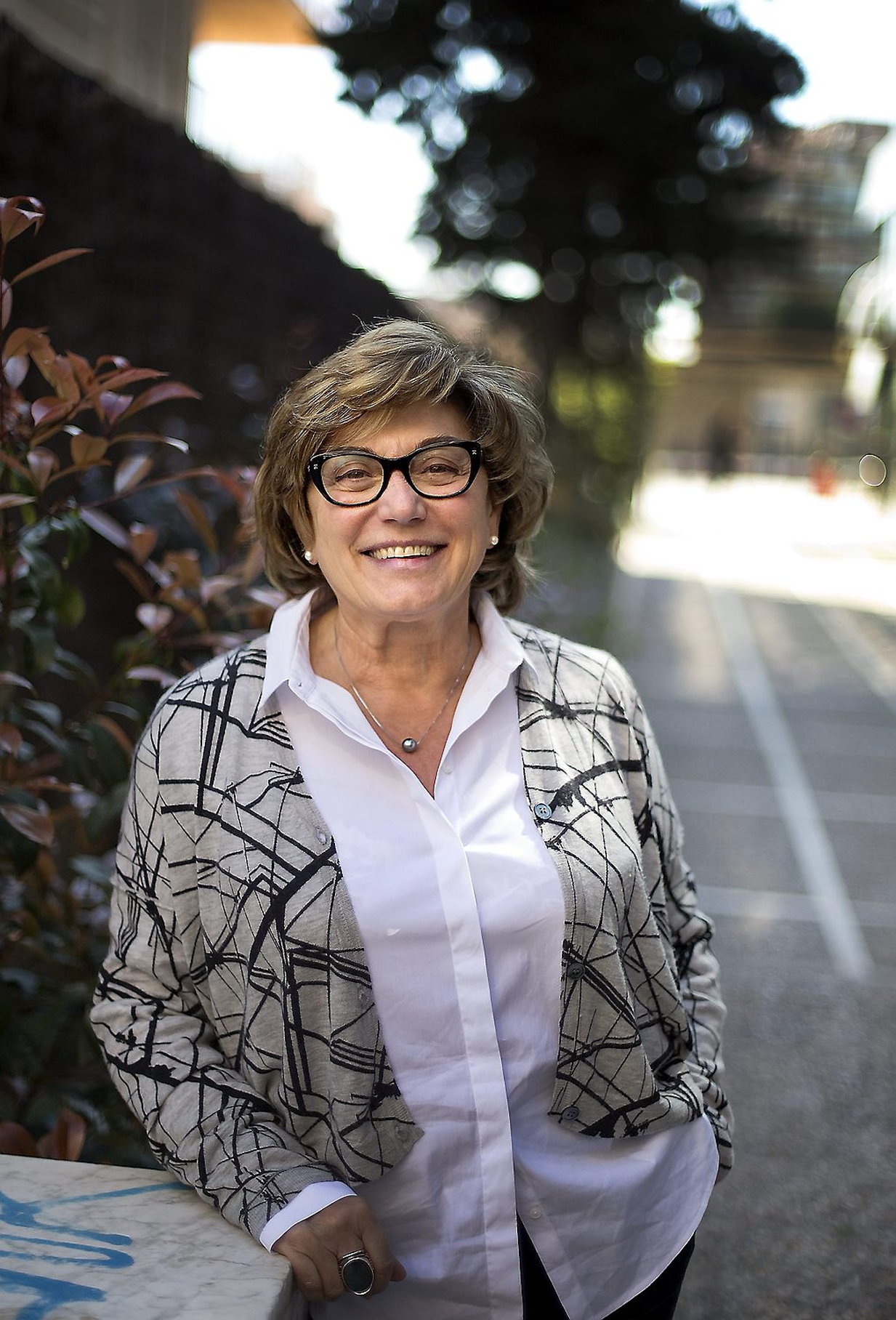
- Born: 14 October 1948 (age 77)
- Occupation: Neuroscientist

Mercè Boada y Rovira (born Barcelona, 14 October 1948) is a Catalan neurologist. She has dedicated her professional career to neurodegenerative diseases. More specifically, dementia and Alzheimer's disease. She was a co-founder of the ACE Foundation, a private non-profit entity dedicated to diagnosis, treatment, research, and helping people with Alzheimer's and their families. Boada received the "Creu de Sant Jordi", Catalonia's highest honor, in 2016.

== Career ==
Boada, who received a doctorate in medicine from the Autonomous University of Barcelona, has focused her professional activity in the field of dementia, especially Alzheimer's disease, and has specialized in research on biomarkers and signaling proteins for this disease, the genetic and environmental factors involved in its appearance, and the application of therapeutic models of cognitive psychostimulation.

She has been the founder and medical director of the ACE Foundation, dedicated to research and people suffering from Alzheimer's disease or other dementias. Boada has published more than 150 articles, has participated in more than 100 clinical trials at the Foundation and is recognized nationally and internationally in the world of neurology.

Her activity in the field of cognitive and behavioral disorders, and in the health planning of resources and services for patients with dementia in Catalonia began in 1986. Her health and social work has led to the establishment and dissemination of specific centers in Catalonia for both its global diagnosis and stopping care for patients with dementia.

Since 1986, she has participated in Catalan institutions as an expert advisor in the elaboration of the Comprehensive Plan for Older People in Catalonia (1990). She coordinated and published a model for care for people with dementia model via "Life in Years Program " of the Catalan Health Service (1991).

In 1991, she founded the first non-pharmacological treatment day center for people with dementia in the Spanish state, Alzheimer Centro Educacional, where she began working with the Comprehensive Psychostimulation Program (PPI Boada & Tárraga, 1994) with the aim of offering a new therapeutic strategy to re-educate, socialize and promote the independence and quality of life of these patients and their families.

In 1995, Mercè Boada together with Lluís Tárraga created the Fundación ACE, a private foundation dedicated to charity. This institution focuses its activity within the field of aging, cognitive decline and dementia. The main objective of the foundation is to promote a comprehensive care model for Alzheimer's disease, allowing to meet the needs of patients, families, professionals and researchers. Its founding objectives are early diagnosis and the treatment of dementia, basic research (clinical and applied) and being a reference resource for primary care and health care through the Day Care Unit.

She has chaired the Catalan Neurology Society, as well as worked with the Valle de Hebrón University Hospital and its research arm.

She is medical director Catalan Institute of Applied Neurosciences in 2016 when she received the "Creu de Sant Jordi".
