= Rosa Oriol =

Spanish businesswoman (born 1946)

- Born: Rosa Maria Oriol Porta; 1946

Rosa Maria Oriol Porta or Rosa Oriol de Tous (born 1946) is a Spanish jeweller, business executive and the creative director of Tous Designer House. She and her husband, Salvador Tous, led the business to grow into an international jewellery and fashion accessories company. She married him in 1965 and at that time Tous was a more local jewelry store founder by his father. Her ideas include reportedly coming up with the "Tous teddy bear" during a trip. She received the Creu de Sant Jordi Award in 2014. She has also received the Ernst and Young Entrepreneur of the Year award and was named a "Fun Fearless Female" by Cosmopolitan magazine.
