= Éliane Thibaut-Comelade =

French cook, journalist, and writer (1928–2021)

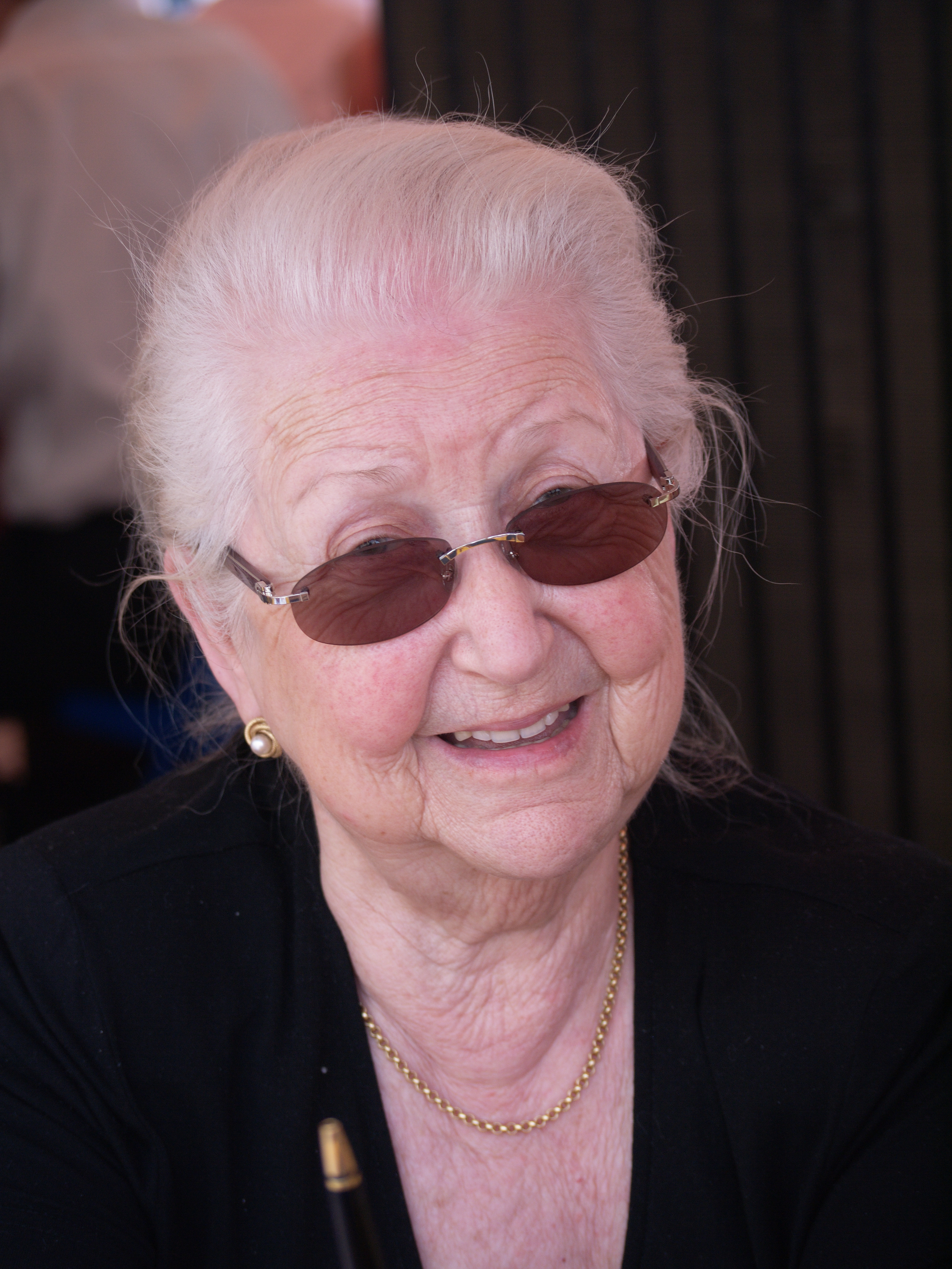
- Thibaut-Comelade in 2010
- Born: July 3, 1928; Rigarda, France
- Died: 6 April 2021 (aged 92); Perpignan
- Occupations: cook, journalist and writer
- Children: Pascal Comelade (son).
- Awards: Creu de Sant Jordi (2009).

Éliane Thibaut-Comelade (3 July 1928 – 7 April 2021) was a French journalist, writer and cook, known for her expertise and knowledge of Catalan cuisine, as well as for her work in the field of food hygiene. In addition to being a professor of education in food science, she wrote over 80 books on the history and specifics of Catalan food. Her major work is La cuisine catalane (in two volumes), regularly reissued since 1978. She won the Joan Blanca prize in 2009, the Creu de Sant Jordi in 2009, and was appointed an officer of the Légion d'honneur in 2020.

== Biography ==
She was born in Rigarda, and her parents were both teachers. She studied initially in Montpellier, Toulouse, and later in Paris, at the école normale nationale d'apprentissage, specializing thereafter in food hygiene. She initially taught in middle and high schools, writing technical manuals on food science, and drew from traditional Catalan cuisines to use as examples in her texts. Her interest in the history of Catalan cuisine developed when she noted a lack of Catalan cookbooks in the 1960s, while working as a food science professor. She developed a significant personal archive of Catalan food history, building from oral accounts and recipes, as well as historical documents, e.g. those that listed menus of banquets. Her publisher, noting Thibaut-Comelade's interest in Catalan food, invited to write a book on the subject, resulting in the publication of her first book on food history and recipes, De la Costa Brava al Canigó (1960).

Thibaut-Comelade began her research in Catalan cuisine in the region of Pyrénées-Orientales, where she interviewed a number of local families including her own, for recipes, food traditions and cultural practices. She also sourced documentation of Catalan food from local institutions, such as the Hôtel de la Poste et de la Perdrix, the oldest hotel in Perpignan, and then expanded this research to study the history of Catalan food across the region, researching in multiple European archives for documentary sources. She wrote over sixty books during her career, including La Table médiévale des Catalans (Presses du Languedoc), in which she differentiated traditional Catalan food from French influences, by emphasizing the use of almonds and olive (picada) over butter and flour (roux), and La cuisine catalane (in two volumes), an encyclopedic account of Catalan cuisine that has been regularly reissued since its first publication in 1978. She was also one of the first scholars to acknowledge Jewish and Arab influences on the development of Catalan cuisine.

Thibaut-Comelade taught the preparation of Catalan cuisine at Hospice d'Ille-sur-Têt in Roussilon, collaborating with chefs and Catalan personalities, including Jordi Pere Cerdà, and Manuel Vázquez Montalbán. In the 1970s, at the invitation of Maryse Florette, the deputy mayor of Ille-sur-Têt, she began conducting cooking workshops to teach Catalan cuisine, which were very popular and continued until restrictions were placed in response to the COVID-19 pandemic.

Thibaut-Comelade died in Perpignan on 6 April 2021, at the age of 92. Her husband, Pierre Comelade, was a psychiatrist, and her son, Pascal Comelade, is a musician and composer.

== Bibliography ==
- Almanach du Catalan 2020, co-authored with Gérard Bardon, éd. CPE, 2019 (almanac).
- Almanach du Catalan 2019, co-authored with Gérard Bardon, éd. CPE, 2018 (almanac).
- Almanach du Catalan 2018, co-authored with Gérard Bardon, éd. CPE, 2017 (almanac).
- Almanach du Catalan 2017, co-authored with Gérard Bardon, éd. CPE, 2016 (almanac).
- Petit traité savant de l’artichaut, éd. Equinoxe, 2016 (cookbook). ISBN 9-782-84135-9332
- Ma cuisine catalane, illustrations by Cécile Colombo, éd. Edisud, 2015 (cookbook). ISBN 9-782-74490-0204
- La cuisine catalane : 300 recettes d’hier et d’aujourd’hui, éd. Trabucaire, 2015 (cookbook). ISBN 9-782-84974-2549
- Le riz en pays catalan, le riz à la paella ou en cassola, éd. Sud Ouest, 2014 (cookbook).
- La cuisine des Pyrénées catalanes : Cerdagne, Capcir, Andorre, éd. Nouvelles Presses du Languedoc, 2013 (cookbook).
- La Cuisine catalane (2 volumes), rééd. Lanore-Delagrave, 2010 (cookbook).
- Ma cuisine catalane au fil des saisons, éd. Edisud, 1998 (cookbook). ISBN 9-782-74490-5728
- Cuisine catalane et vins du Roussillon (Loubatières, 1995) ISBN 2-862-66214-3, 9-782-86266-2145
- Technologie et hygiène alimentaire : 1er cahier, les nutriments, éd. Lanore, 1987 (textbook).
- Art et gastronomie, éd. Lanore, 1982 .
