= El Mago Pop =

Spanish magician

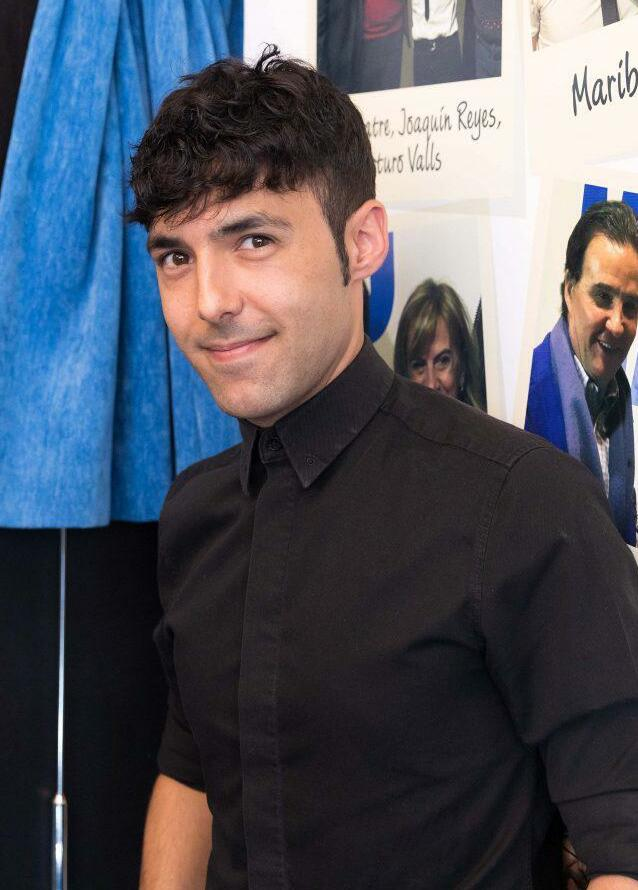
Cascajosa in 2019

Antonio Díaz Cascajosa (Badia del Vallès, Barcelona, Spain, 1986), better known by his stage name El Mago Pop, is a Spanish illusionist.

== Theatre ==
Antonio Díaz began exhibiting his shows in Spanish theaters at the age of 17. After several shows (Dreams, The Night Abbozzi and The Amazing Story of Mr. Snow) he created The Great Illusion.

Premiered at the Teatre Borràs in Barcelona in December 2013, it moved to the Teatre Coliseum. At the end of 2014, it moved to Madrid's Gran Vía. The Great Illusion was relocated to the Coliseum Theatre in Barcelona in April 2015. From September 2015 to April 2016, the show was performed at the Teatro Calderón in Madrid. The Great Illusion ended in July 2017 at the Starlite Festival, after having been seen by more than 800.000 spectators in three years.

In September 2017, the new Nada Es Imposible premiered at the Rialto Theater in Madrid. Antonio Díaz, El Mago Pop, announced in 2018 that he will take his show Nada es Imposible to Broadway.

In 2016 he became the highest-grossing artist in Spain and the highest-grossing illusionist in Europe, earning more than 250 million euros.

=== Teatre Victòria ===
In March 2019 Antonio Díaz carried out one of his “"ital dreams" and purchased the Teatre Victòria in Barcelona from the company "3 per tres" (founded by Dagoll Dagom, Tricicle and Anexa) for close to 30 million euros.

== Television ==
In November 2013, El Mago Pop premiered on Discovery Max, scoring a 4.8% screen share and 810.000 viewers. El Mago Pop aired in 148 countries around the world. In May 2014 it was presented at the UP-FRONT in New York, becoming one of the first Discovery Europe productions to broadcast in the United States.

In October 2014 he began collaborating in the Antena3 TV show "Los Viernes al Show" on Fridays.

In early 2016, a TV special was released in La Sexta, also titled The Great Illusion.

During 2016 and 2017 he continued to perform in programs for Discovery Channel.

During the COVID-19 pandemic, he launched an original ad in collaboration with Danone in more than 20 channels.

On 26 March 2021, Netflix premiered ‘Magic for Humans’ with El Mago Pop. Since October 2021, The Great Illusion has also been streamed on Netflix.

== Records ==
In October 2019 his show "Nada Es Imposible" became the biggest pre-sale show in the history of Spain, beating the Lion King of Madrid.

In 2017 and 2018 he was the artist selling the most tickets in Spain, and the highest-grossing illusionist in Europe.

== Broadway ==
Antonio Diaz is scheduled to perform on Broadway at the Ethel Barrymore Theatre in mid-2023.

== Controversies ==
Within the magician community, Antonio Díaz has faced accusations of plagiarism, as well as using stooges and edited videos during his performances for several years.
