= Mar i cel =

- Mar i Cel (novel) – A novel written by Catalan author Àngel Guimerà in 1888.
- Mar i Cel (musical) – A musical adaptation of the novel, premiered in 1988 by the theater company Dagoll Dagom.
