= Mar i Cel =

Catalan play

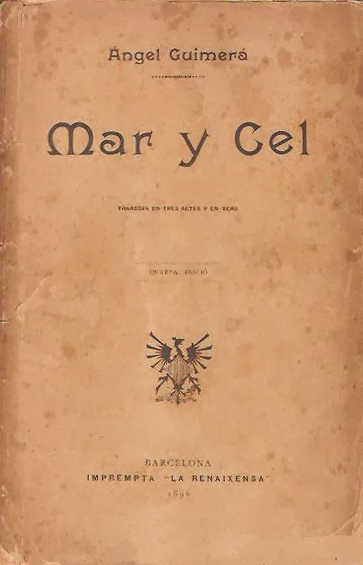
- Author: Àngel Guimerà
- Language: Catalan
- Publication date: 1888

Mar i Cel is a play written by Àngel Guimerà in 1888, first performed at the Romea Theatre in Barcelona on the evening of 7 February of the same year.

It is a romantic tragedy written during the first phase of Guimerà's career as a writer, which lasted until 1890. The play is written in verse and belongs to the historical-romantic genre. It already showcases the main characteristics of his theater, such as the internal conflicts of the characters, who navigate romantic settings.

The action of Mar i Cel takes place on the high seas of the Mediterranean during the first half of the 17th century. The play narrates the impossible love between a Muslim pirate and a Christian girl.

The play is structured in three acts and maintains the unity of place, as all three acts are set in the cabin of the corsairs' ship. Regarding language, the play is written in blank decasyllabic verse (without rhyme), which requires a declamatory style and an emphatic tone, and prominently features the use of hyperbaton. Within the dialogues, and especially in the monologues, there are many images (in the form of metaphors and similes) of high poetic value. However, in the rapid dialogues, the verse is broken (over two or more lines), making the style closer to colloquialism. The use of exclamations (e.g., Bah!, Oh!, My God!) and colloquial expressions further adds to this conversational tone.

== Plot ==
The action takes place in 1629. Saïd is the captain of a ship of Algerian pirates who have taken a group of Christians prisoner after attacking their vessel. Saïd, like Guimerà himself, is of mixed heritage. His father was Muslim, and his mother Christian; they lived peacefully on the Iberian Peninsula. His parents were killed during the expulsion of the Moriscos in 1609, prompting Saïd to seek revenge, as his mother urged him before dying: Avenge us!

Saïd, wounded after boarding and capturing a Christian ship, orders that a Christian girl be brought to him to treat his injuries. This girl is Blanca, the only woman among the prisoners, who had been cloistered in a convent since childhood and was on her way to Barcelona to take her vows as a nun before the attack. The other Christian prisoners include Carles, Blanca's father and a high-ranking military officer; Ferran, the captain of the Christian ship and Blanca's cousin, secretly in love with her since childhood; and other sailors. Their fate is to be sold as slaves, Carles to be ransomed, and Blanca to join the harem of the ruler of Algiers—a destiny she is willing to die to avoid.

Grateful for Blanca's care, Saïd grants her more privileges than the other prisoners and eventually falls in love with her. When Saïd recounts the tragic story of his parents in a dramatic monologue, Blanca is moved to tears. To atone for the guilt of feeling compassion for an infidel, she plans to kill him with a dagger while he sleeps. However, she cannot go through with it, and when Saïd wakes up, he offers his chest for her to strike but faints instead.

In the second act, Blanca is confused by the new emotions she feels for Saïd, while Saïd secretly harbors growing affection and passion for her, revealed through his jealousy upon suspecting a relationship between Blanca and Ferran. Once Saïd confirms there is nothing between them, an impossible love blooms between Saïd and Blanca. They belong to different and opposing worlds, and they know their love will be condemned by all.

Joanot, a renegade Christian in Saïd's crew, becomes the turning point. A fugitive from justice who joined the Muslims, Joanot struggles with the contradictions of abandoning his faith and seeks reconciliation with it. To win the Christians' favor, he decides to free the prisoners, who kill all the pirates except Saïd and take control of the ship.

In the third act, Blanca stands guard outside the cabin where Saïd is held to protect him, threatening to stab herself if anyone harms him. Carles, Blanca's father, disowns her upon discovering her love for a Muslim. There are two attempts to save Saïd: first, Joanot offers to sacrifice himself by pretending to be Saïd so the latter can escape, hoping to reconcile with his faith and have prayers said for his soul. Later, Ferran, who secretly admires his adversary and understands that his cousin was never meant to be a nun, prepares a rowboat for Saïd to escape by night.

However, at the last moment, Carles appears and shoots Saïd, but Blanca steps in to shield him and takes the bullet instead. She dies from her father's shot, and Saïd, in despair, throws himself into the sea with Blanca, and they die together. The death of the two protagonists is the only way they can be united in love. They live in two opposing worlds—one the sea, the other the sky—which only meet at the horizon that is death.

== Translations and adaptations ==
This play has been translated into Spanish by Enric Gaspar; into French by Artur Vinardell; into English by Francesc Roig; into Italian by Suñer; and into Esperanto by Jaume Grau Casas. There are also three additional translations into Czech, Sicilian, and Portuguese.

The play inspired a musical produced by Dagoll-Dagom, Mar i Cel. The Spanish version inspired the work Ni mar ni cielo o la monja del puñalet by Enrique González Bedmar (1892). A production of the musical at Teatre Victòria began in September 2024.
