= Tricicle =

Spanish theater company focused on sketches

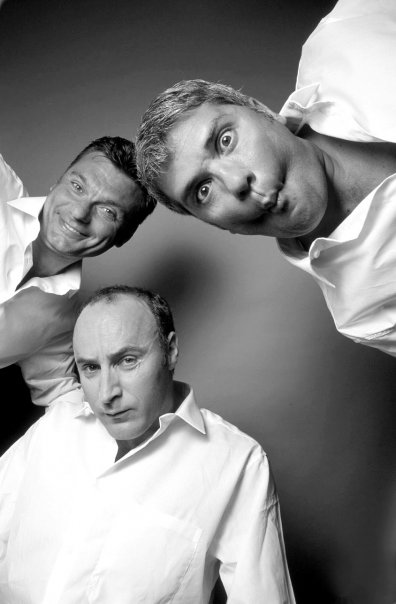
- Tricicle in 2013. Sans (left), Mir (center) and Gràcia (right)

Comedy career
- Years active: 1979–present
- Genre: Sketch comedy
- Website: https://www.tricicle.com/

Tricicle (Catalan: [tɾiˈsi.klə]) is a Spanish physical comedy group consisting of Joan Gràcia, Francesc ''Paco'' Mir, and Carles Sans. Founded in 1979, the group initially performed short sketches in public spaces and alternative venues. The members were students at Barcelona's Institut del Teatre, where they studied pantomime and dramatic arts.

In 1982, Tricicle made their professional circuit debut at the Sala Villarroel in Barcelona. The show consisted of a compilation of sketches, as developed during their performances in "cafés-teatro" (bars and cafés offering live performances). The production, titled Manicomic won a prize at the Sitges International Theatre Festival the same year.

== History ==
In 1982, Tricicle premiered their first production, Manicomic, at the Sala Villarroel. Manicomic was a collection of gags, created over three years. That same year, they received a prize at the Sitges International Theater Festival.

=== Recognition in Spain ===
In 1983, the group met television director Narciso Ibáñez Serrador, who invited them to perform a sketch on the TV show Un, dos, tres... responda otra vez. They presented a parody of Julio Iglesias's song "Soy un truhán, soy un señor."

Following this exposure, Tricicle premiered their show Exit in 1984. The production toured across Spain and led to invitations to perform in several other countries.

=== Later productions ===
In 1986, Tricicle premiered their third production, Slastic, a series of comic sketches centered on sports. In November 2004, the group selected this work to celebrate its 25th anniversary.

Later, Tricicle joined two other groups in Spain, Dagoll Dagom and Append, to found the production company "3xtr3s" (three by three). In addition to producing shows for three companies and other groups, the company leased the historic Teatre Victòria in Barcelona for 20 years. The first production staged by "3xtr3s" at the theatre was Botiga dels horrors (The Little Shop of Horrors) by Howard Ashman.

=== Maturity (1990s–2000s) ===
In 1992, the trio premiered its fourth production, Terrrific. That same year, they produced a second TV series, Festivals, and began preparing their first short film. On August 9, 1992, they performed at the Montjuïc Olympic Stadium during the closing ceremony of the Barcelona Olympic Games. This marked the first comic performance included in an Olympic ceremony.

Terrrific was followed in 1996 by Entretres, which toured multiple cities over 3+ years.

In 1999, they premiered Tricicle 20, an anthology of sketches from previous productions commemorating the group's twentieth anniversary.

In 2002, the group premiered Sit, a collection of comic situations involving a chair. The show ran for three months at a theater in Paris during the winter of 2004.

On November 3, 2004, Tricicle celebrated its 25th anniversary with an event at the Palau Sant Jordi in Barcelona. The event, co-produced with the newspaper Sport (also celebrating its 25th anniversary), was called "25 + 25" and featured a special recreation of Slastic. Several prominent athletes, including Ángel Nieto, Miguel Indurain, Alex Corretja, Sergi Bruguera, Ronaldinho, and Hristo Stoichkov, participated by performing in individual gags. Comedians including Millán Salcedo, Santiago Segura, and Pepe Rubianes also took part.

By 2005, Tricicle had toured internationally in countries including China, Tunisia, Portugal, Austria, and Argentina. In 2018, the group retired from live stage performances.

In 2023, Tricicle received the Max Award of Honour for their contributions to the performing arts in Spain. In 2025, the group partnered with CaixaBank in a campaign to raise awareness of fraud.

== Theatre ==
- 1982: Manicomic
- 1984: Exit
- 1986: Slastic
- 1992: Terrrific
- 1996: Entretres
- 1999: Tricicle 20
- 2002: Sit
- 2007: Garrick
- 2012: Bits
- 2017: Hits

== Film ==
- Features:
  - 1995: Palace
- Shorts:
  - 1993: Quien mal anda, mal acaba
  - 1995: David
  - 1996: Mendigos sin fronteras
  - 1997: Polvo eres
  - 2002: Sit (documentary)

== Television ==
- 1987: Tres Estrelles
- 1992: Fiestas populares
- 1994: Xoooof!
- 1999: Pecera de BTV
- 2000–2003: Dinamita
- 2005: Teletipos
- 2005: Trilita
- 2010: Més Dinamita

== Special events ==
- 1992: Juegos Paralímpicos (Paralympic Games)
- 1992: Closing Ceremony of the Barcelona '92 Olympics
- 1992: Seville Expo '92
- 1993: Special Olympics
- 2004: 25 + 25

== Awards ==
- Gold Medal of Merit in the Fine Arts, 2009
- Max Award of Honour, 2023
