= Pere Calders =

Catalan writer and cartoonist (1912–1994)

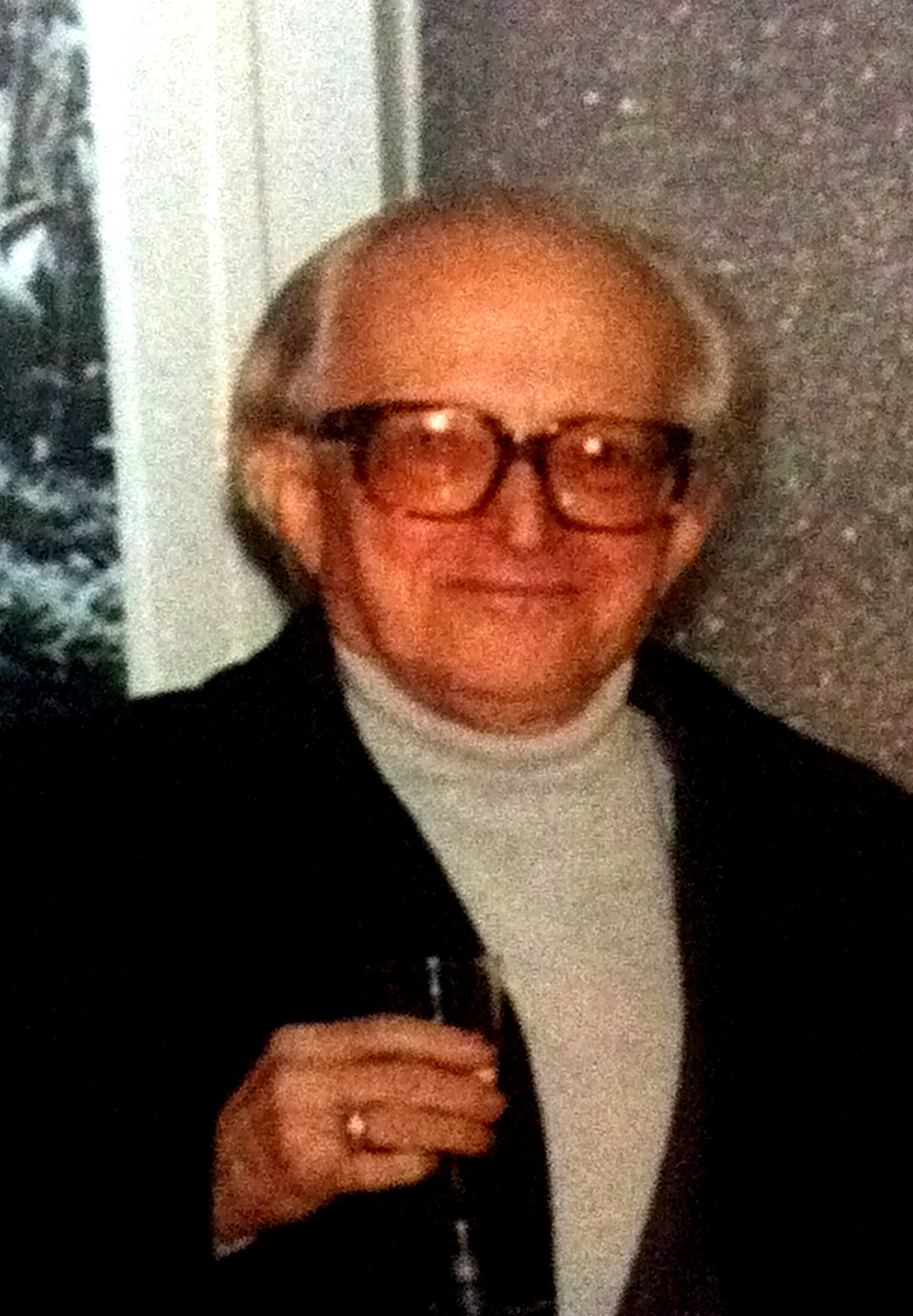
- Born: 29 September 1912; Barcelona, Spain
- Died: 21 July 1994 (aged 81); Barcelona, Spain
- Occupations: Writer, journalist, cartoonist
- Writing career
- Genres: Catalan literature, Magic realism
- Notable works: The First Harlequin, The Glory of Doctor Larén, Chronicles of the Hidden Truth, People of the High Valley

Pere Calders i Rossinyol (Catalan: [ˈpeɾə kəlˈdez i rusiˈɲɔl]; Barcelona, 29 September 1912 – 21 July 1994) was a writer, journalist and illustrator from Catalonia, known mainly for his work as a short story writer. Over his life, he received several awards, including the Creu de Sant Jordi in 1982 and the Premi d'Honor de les Lletres Catalanes in 1986. Besides short stories, Calders wrote several novels and journalistic articles for some of the most important publications in Catalonia. His writings were noted for their irony and occasional fantasy. As an illustrator, he reached the position of director of L'Esquella de la Torratxa, together with his friend Tísner.

After the Spanish Civil War, in which Calders fought on the Republican side, he went into exile in Mexico where he lived for twenty-three years. With the stories he wrote during his early exile years, he compiled a collection called Cròniques de la veritat oculta, his best-known book, which won the Víctor Català Prize in 1954. However, Calders did not become truly popular until 1978 with the premiere of Antaviana, a theatrical work by Dagoll Dagom based on his stories. Following the success of Antaviana, many of his books were reissued and his work was translated into fifteen different languages. In 1992, the Autonomous University of Barcelona awarded him an honorary doctorate.

—Why did you start writing? —Because I had a head full of stories. At first, I wrote them to explain them to myself, putting them into order. At the time, I did not consider the opinion of others. I was both the businessperson and the audience. But I would lie if I did not confess that when someone, a friend, told me that sometimes I got it right, I felt very flattered. On occasion, I have said that I envy writers for whom writing, according to them, means suffering; it seems to me a symbol of the transcendence of their work. I am ashamed to confess that for me it is the opposite: I suffer when I cannot write. And I enjoy it very much when I do.

— Interview with Lluís Busquets i Grabulosa, Pere Calders

== Biography ==
Pere Calders i Rossinyol was born in Barcelona on 29 September 1912, at 274 Rosselló Street, in the Eixample district. He was the only child of the marriage between Vicenç Caldés Arús, a graphic artist and writer who had written some novels and plays, and Teresa Rusiñol Roviralta. Both parents were Catalan peasants who had moved to Barcelona shortly after getting married, and thus Calders’ education developed within a Catalan atmosphere. When he was born, his father registered him as Pedro de Alcántara Caldés y Rusiñol and did not normalize his name and surnames until 1936. Shortly after Calders’ birth, they moved to live in the el Clot neighborhood of Barcelona. During his childhood, he spent long periods at Can Maurí, a family property located between the municipalities of Polinyà, Sabadell and Sentmenat. Those stays greatly influenced Calders’ literary work because, at dusk, the family gathered around the fireplace and told stories and tales.

Before attending school, his mother taught him to read. While living in Clot, Calders studied at the Sant Pere Claver School, which was run by Jesuits, and in 1920, coinciding with another move to Balmes Street, he enrolled at the Mossèn Cinto School, where Avel·lí Artís i Gener (Tísner), the philologist Joan Coromines, and Ricard Boadella were also students. There, students regularly wrote essays about whatever they wanted, and some of those exercises later became published stories, such as the one that gives the title to his first collection, El primer arlequí. However, the school was closed in 1923, accused of separatism. Afterwards, the school's director, Josep Parunella, continued teaching at the Reixach Academy. Calders went there to study and continued to receive writing classes from Parunella.

=== Youth ===
Between 1929 and 1934, he studied at the Llotja, the School of Fine Arts, where he met classmates like Tísner and had teachers such as the painter Ramon Calsina. There he met Mercè Casals, whom he later married.

While studying at Llotja, he worked as an apprentice with a Czech advertiser named Karel Černý. In 1930, he founded a graphic design studio with two classmates, Estudi CCC. In 1933, he started working for the Diario Mercantil, where Tísner also worked, as an editor. There he published his first articles and drew illustrations to accompany articles and poems. That same year the newspaper closed, and its director, Josep Janés i Olivé, founded another newspaper called Avui, where Calders published a regular column. Calders also designed the newspaper and its header. It was in this newspaper that he published his first story. However, this newspaper did not last long and eventually closed.

In 1934, when the Events of October 6 took place, Calders was a member of Palestra, an organization he described as "special, somewhat political, somewhat educational, a hiking club". On Sundays, they practiced military training with sticks that simulated rifles. On October 6, they were given rifles, including Calders, who did not know how to use them, and were divided into groups. Calders' group was sent to the Coliseum Theatre, where they spent the night. They heard gunshots but did not know exactly what was happening until Josep Maria Batista i Roca went up on stage at dawn and told them everything was lost and they could leave.

On 4 November 1935, he married Mercè Casals, and on 31 July 1936 their first and only child, Joan Caldés i Casals, was born. That same June, Josep Janés published Calders' first book, El primer arlequí, a collection of eight stories, as part of the Quaderns Literaris collection. In December 1936, Josep Janés published, also within Quaderns Literaris, Calders' first novel, La glòria del doctor Larén.

==== Spanish Civil War ====
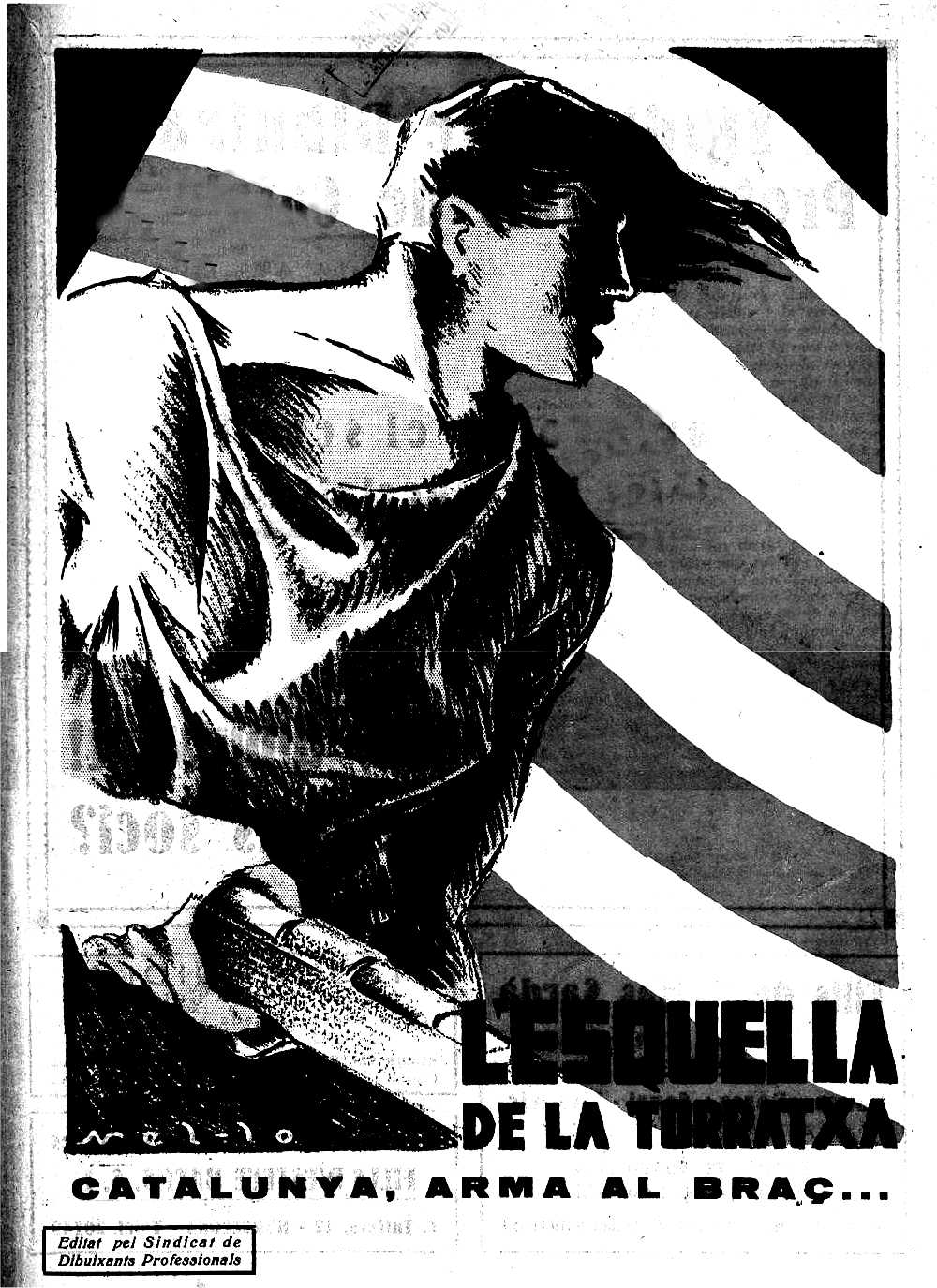
Pere Calders co-directed L'Esquella de la Torratxa with Tísner during the Spanish Civil War.

In 1936, before the outbreak of the Spanish Civil War, Calders was a member of the youth wing of Acció Catalana. With the start of the war and the creation of the PSUC, Calders joined this party, partly because its program was based on self-determination.

In October 1936, the magazine L'Esquella de la Torratxa was relaunched, and Calders and Tísner were put in charge of its direction in this new phase. During this period, he also worked for the publication Mirador, where he published the story Les mans del taumaturg, later included in the book Cròniques de la veritat oculta. He also contributed drawings to the Diari de Barcelona.

At the end of 1937, he enlisted as a volunteer in the Republican army, serving in the corps of customs officers, where he was appointed cartographic technician. With the beginning of the Battle of Teruel, his cartographic unit was deployed there. That same year, he submitted the unpublished novel La cèl·lula to the Joan Crexells Prize for narrative, which was ultimately won by Mercè Rodoreda with her novel Aloma. La cèl·lula was lost during his return trip from exile. From his war experience, he wrote the novel Unitats de xoc, published in 1938 by Editorial Forja. In 1938, he also wrote the novel Gaeli i l'home Déu, which was not published until 1986, and submitted it to the 1938 Joan Crexells Prize as well, but it did not win.

=== Exile ===
==== France ====
On 10 February 1939, Calders left for France, leaving his wife and son in Barcelona. He crossed the Coll d'Ares on the same day and went to Prats de Molló i la Presta. There, he was imprisoned in a concentration camp. Calders and four companions, including Tísner and his brother-in-law, Enric Clusellas, managed to escape and fled to Toulouse, where the University Committee for Refugee Aid offered protection to intellectuals. There he was given forms to choose the country where they would go if they had to leave France, and Calders chose Mexico. For a while, he lived there with Tísner and part of his family, including his future wife, Rosa Artís i Gener.

On 2 April 1939, he left for Roissy-en-Brie, where he met other intellectuals of the time such as Mercè Rodoreda, Francesc Trabal, Armand Obiols, Cèsar August Jordana, and Xavier Benguerel i Llobet. He developed a friendship with Benguerel that lasted until his death.

Finally, on 4 July 1939, he left for Mexico, where Tísner was already living, aboard the ship Mexique departing from Bordeaux. Shortly after his departure, his wife, Mercè Casals, arrived at Roissy-en-Brie, and when she saw Calders had already left, she also went to Mexico, unaware that Calders had written several love letters to Rosa Artís, with whom he was in love but never married.

"I feel compelled to flee from everything I love, and I have so much rage and sorrow that I cry with dry eyes, and I wouldn't mind dying at all."
— Pere Calders

==== Mexico ====
On 27 July 1939, Calders arrived at the port of Veracruz. During the voyage, Calders took part in the ship's log. From Veracruz, he traveled to Mexico City. Calders carried a letter of recommendation from Francesc Trabal addressed to Josep Carner and another from Armand Obiols addressed to his brother. There, he first met Obiols’ brother, but he was unable to offer him work because his business partner had just stolen the company's money. He then met with Carner, who helped him publish three of his short stories in exchange for 240 pesos, enough to live for about three months at that time. Carner also gave him a letter of recommendation for the Atlante Publishing House, where Calders later worked. He also reunited with his friend Tísner. At the end of 1939, Mercè Casals arrived in Mexico and met Calders. Calders and his wife lived together, even though he had already declared his love for Rosa Artís and they were courting.

In October 1941, he began collaborating with Full Català, where he published some short stories such as Raspall. With the stories he published during his exile, later collected in Memòries especials, Calders won the Concepció Rabell Prize for narrative at the Catalan Language Floral Games held in Mexico on 3 May 1942. For a time, he worked with Tísner at Publicistas Mexicanos, S.A. as a photographer, earning one peso per job. In 1943, he began working at UTEHA (Unión Tipográfica Editorial Hispanoamericana) as a graphic artist and technical draftsman and remained there until his return to Barcelona. Throughout his exile, he also contributed to several publications such as La Revista dels catalans a Amèrica, Quaderns de l'Exili, Revista de Catalunya, Lletres, La Nostra Revista, and Pont Blau, among others. On 22 July 1943, he was granted a divorce after having applied for it two years earlier and married Rosa Artís on the same day.

On 5 May 1947, the first child of his second marriage, Raimon Calders i Artís, was born. Soon after this birth, they moved to Chapultepec. That same year, at the request of Josep Carner and Pompeu Fabra, he published the short story La ratlla i el desig in the Revista de Catalunya. With this same story, he won one of the prizes at the Catalan Language Floral Games of 1948. In 1949, the second daughter of the marriage, Glòria Calders i Artís, was born, and a year later their third daughter, Tessa Calders i Artís. At that time, Calders had decided to wake up every day at 4:30 a.m. to dedicate two and a half hours to writing. In the early 1950s, Joan Triadú encouraged him to compile the various short stories he had written during exile. These stories would become the book Cròniques de la veritat oculta. Calders sent them to Catalonia, where his father, with whom he maintained an intense epistolary relationship throughout his exile, typed them and submitted them to the Víctor Català Prize in 1954. The book won the prize and was published in 1955 by Editorial Selecta. The release of Cròniques de la veritat oculta was a success and established Calders as one of the great Catalan short story writers. Between 1954 and 1955, he wrote the novel Ronda naval sota la boira. He submitted this novel to the 1957 Joanot Martorell Prize for novels, but Blai Bonet won with his work El mar. In 1957, he also published Gent de l'alta vall, a collection of stories with Mexican themes. He had also written the short novel Aquí descansa Nevares, but it was not published until 1967. In the prologue to Aquí descansa Nevares, Calders refers to his exile experience:

I have spent half of my life in Catalonia and the other half in Mexico. […] I have seen more mountain Indians than Mediterranean fishermen. For a Catalan, that is quite a lot. Such a phenomenon almost never occurs due to trivial causes, and the one that pushed me and mine was a very famous upheaval, which I still cannot come to terms with.

— Pere Calders

== Return to Barcelona ==
Pere Calders returned to Barcelona on 9 October 1962 after twenty-three years of exile. His decision was influenced by various personal and political reasons, including a letter from his brother-in-law, Vicenç Caldés Arús, encouraging him to return and highlighting his parents’ advanced age.

Initially, Calders remained ambivalent about returning permanently. In fact, upon arrival, he carried a return ticket to Mexico and continued to sign some of his letters with his Mexican address. Eventually, however, he decided to settle in Barcelona with Rosa Artís and their children.

In 1964, he published the short story collection Demà, a les tres de la matinada ('Tomorrow at Three in the Morning'), written during his last years in Mexico. During the first years of his return, Calders faced economic difficulties, partly due to the censorship that affected his literary and journalistic output. Despite this, he began collaborating with magazines such as Serra d'Or, Destino, Tele/eXprés, and Canigó.

He also exchanged letters with other Catalan intellectuals, including the poet and publisher Joan Oliver.

In 1978, journalist Lluís Busquets described him as "a storyteller, witty and fun." Calders continued to publish fiction and essays, becoming one of the leading voices of postwar Catalan literature.

He also appeared on the Catalan TV programme Identitats, where he discussed the struggles of returning from exile and rebuilding one's identity.

=== Popular recognition ===
In 1978, Pere Calders returned to live in Barcelona. His reputation as a short story writer and his previous books had earned him considerable respect in literary circles, but it was in the 1980s, when his works reached a broader audience, that he gained widespread recognition.

In 1983, the theater company Dagoll Dagom premiered the musical Antaviana, based on several of his short stories. The show's success brought his name to the forefront of Catalan cultural life and contributed to a revival of interest in his work. The staging, which blended fantastical elements with humor and political satire, perfectly captured the tone of Calders's narratives and won over both audiences and critics.

This renewed popularity was also accompanied by the publication of new collections and reissues of earlier works. In 1984, the television program Identitats, broadcast by TV3, dedicated an episode to Calders, which included interviews and commentary on his life and work.

Critics and readers alike praised his mastery of the short story genre, his use of irony, and his subtle criticism of authoritarianism and exile. The 1980s cemented Calders's status as one of the most important voices in post-war Catalan literature.

==== Death ====
Pere Calders i Rossinyol died on 21 July 1994, aged 81, in the home of his daughter Tessa. The news of his death was published the next day in the newspaper Avui, and all Catalan media reported it. The funeral chapel was installed in the lobby of the headquarters of the Institution of Catalan Letters at the Casa Amatller. On the morning of 23 July, an open funeral was held at the Pompeia church, attended by several political personalities of the time, such as Pasqual Maragall, mayor of Barcelona, and Joan Guitart i Agell, Minister of Culture. A private ceremony was later held at Collserola cemetery where his body was cremated. His ashes were deposited in the monument erected to Pere Calders on the seafront promenade of Llançà.

Then I, without the weight of the flesh, will feel unbound from hands. And if it turns out there is a heaven, I will go there, where I will spend a long time.

— Pere Calders, The End in Chronicles of the Hidden Truth

== Style ==
Pere Calders is best known for his short stories, which have received much more attention from critics and the public than his novels. Calders's stories have been described as humorous, ironic, fantastic, and absurd, and some have placed them within magical realism, a style uncommon at that time that reflects fantastic or unreal ideas in an everyday world.

In much of his stories, especially in his earlier narrations, Calders shows a predilection for the strange. In these stories, implausible and fantastic events occur which interact with the protagonist and often act as catalysts for the plot. However, the exaltation of magical or supernatural elements is not Calders's creative purpose, unlike in fantasy literature. A tendency observable in his fantastic stories is that his protagonists, although sometimes complaining about these fantastic events, usually end up accepting them very naturally, and those who do not are ridiculed by other characters who consider these events quite normal. An example of this can be seen in the story L'any de la meva gràcia ("The Year of My Grace"), where the protagonist one day suddenly discovers that by passing his hand over the unpainted face of wooden dolls, he can paint their faces with extraordinary realism, and not only accepts this power he has been given but even expresses discomfort because he believes the power is modest and not very useful. According to Amanda Bath, Calders's stories can be equated with Jorge Luis Borges, Julio Cortázar, or Gabriel García Márquez as equally talented exponents within the magical realism genre.

But not all of Calders's stories are fantastic. Many contain no fantastic element, in which Calders plays with the reader by showing one thing but saying another. In these stories, a reality is presented that completely diverges from what the narrator tells, often showcasing Calders's humor and wit. Sometimes this contrast between reality and appearance creates doubts for the reader about what actually happened, as in Invasió subtil ("Subtle Invasion"), where the narrator is fully convinced he is dining with a Japanese man pretending to be Catalan, even though this interpretation completely contradicts the text. Or in Vinc per donar fe ("I Come to Bear Witness"), where the narrator says there is a vampire in the village and suddenly finds his cousin unconscious in the street, whom he kills believing she is a vampire, although the text tells us she was a woman who often fainted, creating doubt about whether she really had become a vampire. Despite no justification in the text, speculation arises about the possibility that the narrator is right. A contrast between reality and appearance occurs.

Calders also wrote five stories and one novella that stand apart because they show a Mexican theme and influence. These narrations describe Mexican protagonists with behavioral habits and psychological tendencies similar to those described by the American anthropologist Oscar Lewis, whom Calders had read. In some of these stories, the attitude of Mexicans toward death and the cult of death they profess can also be observed. These stories are also different from the others because they have a more realistic and less fantastic tone.

=== Typical elements in his work ===
One of the people who has studied Pere Calders' work the most is Joan Palà, who has identified a series of elements typical in Calders' work. In his literary universe, the house is a symbol of security and order that often appears at the beginning of his stories. He uses it as a starting point for a process that eventually leans towards upheaval. Another of these elements is the garden, which represents a setting where anything can happen. This is observable in the story El principi de la saviesa, where the narrator finds a hand in his home's garden and, while looking for the owner, many of the unbelievable things that happen in that garden are told to us. An object that often appears in Calders' literature is the clock, which symbolizes the futility of human effort to represent something that is pure idea, an impossible attempt to put limits on that which has none: time. Also often present are scientists, researchers, or inventors immersed in impossible endeavors, representing human naivety and the useless effort to master nature. Finally, another very present element in Calders' literature is crime. His texts are full of crimes and murders that, moreover, are usually committed with complete naturalness. Calders uses this to subvert moral and social conventions and, with the help of irony, to turn moral clichés about guilt and innocence upside down.

=== Possible influences ===
When analyzing Calders' work, similarities can be found with other authors who might have influenced him, although he never confirmed any. For example, his work shows influences from the humor and irony displayed by the Grup de Sabadell, together with their critical view of the bourgeoisie. Within the Catalan context, it has also been suggested that the poet Josep Carner might be an influence. Calders discovered Carner as a teenager when reading L'oreig entre les canyes and was so fascinated that he read all his works. In Calders' early short stories, influences from the science fiction works of Jules Verne and H. G. Wells can also be appreciated. For example, in the collection El primer arlequí, there is the story La meva estada al centre de la Terra (My Stay at the Centre of the Earth), where a sculptor creates a giant reproduction of the Earth and the protagonist enters through one of the poles, seemingly parodying Verne's famous Journey to the Center of the Earth. Regarding H. G. Wells, one example of his possible influence can be found in the book Invasió subtil i altres contes, which contains the story Un trau a l'infinit (A Hole to Infinity) about a scientist claiming to have discovered the fourth dimension, recalling Wells' novel The Time Machine.

Since Calders' most popular work is his short stories, possible influences in this genre have also been discussed. One of these is the literature of Edgar Allan Poe and his tales full of mystery and imagination. Like Poe, Calders tries in some stories to explore exceptional, inexplicable, and incredible phenomena but with a less dark and gloomy style, and unlike Poe, Calders prefers to entertain the reader rather than confuse or horrify. Another probable and important influence is Massimo Bontempelli, the introducer of magical realism in Italy, considered one of the first authors of this literary movement. It is quite likely that Calders read the Italian author before publishing his first works, since in 1935 an anthology of his stories was published in the Quaderns Literaris of Josep Janés publishing house, and a year later his first collection of stories and his first novel were published. Another author frequently mentioned when discussing Calders' influences is Franz Kafka, because he also followed magical realism and both question whether it is possible to morally judge human acts in some of their stories. Many of Calders' stories reference chance or fate, using it to question human free will and thus the lack of responsibility for their acts. Other authors of short stories said to have influenced Calders and with whom he is often compared include the Italian Luigi Pirandello, the Polish Sławomir Mrozek, and the French Charles Nodier, among others.

== Awards and honors ==
Pere Calders received the following major awards during his career:

Year	Award	Work awarded
1942	Premi Concepció Rabell	Memòries especials
1948	Jocs Florals de la Llengua Catalana	La ratlla i el desig
1954	Premi Víctor Català	Cròniques de la veritat oculta
1963	Premi Sant Jordi de novel·la	L'ombra de l'atzavara
1969	Premi Crítica Serra d'Or (short stories)	Tots els contes
1979	Premi Lletra d'Or	Invasió subtil i altres contes
1979	Premi Crítica Serra d'Or (short stories)	Invasió subtil i altres contes
1982	Creu de Sant Jordi	Literary career
1982	Premi Crítica Serra d'Or (children's literature)	Raspall
1983	Premis Literaris de la Generalitat de Catalunya	Tot s'aprofita
1984	Premi Crítica Serra d'Or (narrative)	Tot s'aprofita
1986	Premi d'Honor de les Lletres Catalanes	Literary career
1986	Premi Crexells	Gaeli i l'home déu
1992	Gold Medal of Artistic Merit of the City of Barcelona	Literary career
1992	Honorary doctorate by the Autonomous University of Barcelona	Literary career
1993	National Journalism Prize	Sense carta de navegar, published in Avui
1995	Premi Crítica Serra d'Or (journalistic prose)	Mesures, alarmes i prodigis

== Principal works ==
=== Editions in English ===
- Brush; translated by Louise Lewis; pictures by Carme Solé Vendrell. London: Blackie, 1982. ISBN 0216913322
- Brush; translated by Marguerite Feitlowitz; pictures by Carme Solé Vendrell. Brooklyn, N.Y.: Kane/Miller, 1986. ISBN 9780916291167
- The virgin of the railway and other stories; translated by Amanda Bath. Warminster: Aris & Phillips, 1991. ISBN 0856685461
- "Subtle invasion" and "Catalans about the world" in Catalonia, a self-portrait; edited and translated by Josep Miquel Sobrer. Bloomington: Indiana University Press, 1992. ISBN 978-0253288837
- "The desert", a short story in The Dedalus book of Spanish fantasy; edited and translated by Margaret Jull Costa and Annella McDermott. Sawtry: Dedalus; 1999. ISBN 9781873982181 ISBN 1873982186

=== Collected works ===
- El primer arlequí (The First Harlequin) (1936)
- Unitats de xoc (Pieces of Conflict) (1938)
- Memòries especials (Special Memories) (1942)
- Cròniques de la veritat oculta (Chronicles of the Hidden Truth) (1955)
- Gent de l'alta vall (People of the High Valley ) (1957)
- Demà a les tres de la matinada (Tomorrow at Three in the Morning) (1959)
- Invasió subtil i altres contes (Subtle Invasion and Other Stories) (1978)
- Antaviana (Antaviana) (1979), with Dagoll Dagom
- Tot s'aprofita (1983)
- El sabeu, aquell? (1983)
- De teves a meves: trenta-dos contes que acaben més o menys bé (From Yours to Mine: Thirty-Three Stories That End More or Less Well) (1984)
- Els nens voladors (The Flying Children) (1984)
- Tres per cinc, quinze (Three Times Five, Fifteen) (1984)
- La cabra i altres narracions (The Goat and Other Narratives) (1984)
- El desordre públic (Public Disorder) (1984)
- Un estrany al jardí (A Stranger in the Garden) (1985)
- El barret fort i altres inèdits (The Bowler Hat and Other Unpublished Works) (1987)
- Raspall (Brush) (1987)
- Kalders i Tísner, dibuixos de guerra a L'Esquella de la Torratxa (1991)
- L'honor a la deriva (Honor Adrift) (1992)
- Mesures, alarmes i prodigis (1994)
- La lluna a casa i altres contes (The Moon at Home and Other Stories) (1995)
- Cartes d'amor (Love Letters) (1996)
- Tots els contes (All Stories) (2008)

=== Novels ===
- La glòria del doctor Larén (The Glory of Doctor Larén) (1936)
- L'ombra de l'atzavara (The Shade of the Agave Plant) (1964)
- Ronda naval sota la boira (Naval Patrol Through the Fog) (1966)
- Aquí descansa Nevares (Here Rests Nevares) (1967)
- Gaeli i l'home Déu (1984)
- La ciutat cansada (The Tired City) (2008) (unfinished)
- Sense anar tant lluny (Without Going Too Far) (2009) (unfinished)
- La marxa cap al mar (The Walk to Sea) (2009) (unfinished)
- L'amor de Joan (Juan's Love) (2009) (unfinished)

=== Theatre ===
- Taula rodona (unfinished). Argentona: Voliana Edicions, 2015. (The book includes La joia de ser catalans, by Víctor Alexandre, which merges with Calders' work.)

=== Drawings ===
- Kalders i Tísner. Dibuixos de guerra, edited by Lluís Solà i Dachs, Barcelona: La Campana, 1991.

== Personal archive ==
Following the death of Pere Calders, his daughter Tessa donated part of his papers, writings, and documents to the Universitat Autònoma de Barcelona (UAB). His son Joan also contributed a trunk to the university, which was believed to contain the lost novel La cèl·lula. However, it was found to hold only papers relating to his father, Vicenç Caldés i Arús. The UAB, in collaboration with the Institute for Catalan Studies (IEC), undertook the task of enriching the archive with articles and illustrations published in the press and literary magazines.

Among the materials deposited at the UAB were four unfinished novels, all of which were later published. The first to appear was La ciutat cansada, written intermittently by Calders during the 1940s and 1950s. It is believed to be missing only one or two chapters. The novel was published by Edicions 62 in September 2008. That same year, the unfinished novel L’amor de Joan—a work penned by Calders at the age of 18—was published in the journal Els Marges. In 2009, the UAB, once again in collaboration with the IEC, published the remaining two novels: Sense anar tan lluny and La marxa cap al mar. The former is thought to have been written around 1966, with 300 handwritten pages preserved, while 64 manuscript pages survive of the latter, believed to date from the early 1960s.

Calders's influence can be seen in the work of numerous Catalan-language writers, particularly those devoted to the short story. Among them is Quim Monzó, who once revealed that he discovered Pere Calders when he read Tots els contes at around the age of thirty. He was utterly captivated, noting how Calders's writing stood in stark contrast to the dominant realist authors of the time. Jesús Moncada also recognised Calders's influence on his early stories. Having worked with him at the publishing house Montaner i Simón, Moncada regarded Calders as a mentor—who not only wrote the foreword to his first short story collection but also read his early work and encouraged him to keep writing. Another writer who acknowledged the influence of Calders is Joan Pinyol, who corresponded with him for over ten years.

== Bibliography ==
- Álvarez, Susanna; Bacardí, Montserrat; Calders, Pere; Triadú, Joan (2009). Estimat amic: cartes, textos. Publicacions de l'Abadia de Montserrat. ISBN 978-84-9883-189-4.
- Bath, Amanda (1987). Pere Calders: ideari i ficció. Barcelona: Edicions 62. ISBN 84-297-2551-2.
- Coca, Jordi (1983). Ni àngels ni dimonis. Biblioteca Serra d'Or; vol. 39. Barcelona: Publicacions de l'Abadia de Montserrat. ISBN 978-84-7202-545-5.
- Gregori Soldevila, Carme (2006). Pere Calders: tòpics i subversions de la tradició fantàstica. Barcelona: Publicacions de l'Abadia de Montserrat. ISBN 84-8415-803-9.
- Gregori Soldevila, Carme (July–August 2012). "El segle de Pere Calders". Serra d'Or (631–632). Barcelona: Publicacions de l'Abadia de Montserrat: 33–37.
- Melcion, Jordi (1986). Cròniques de la veritat oculta, de Pere Calders. Barcelona: Empúries. ISBN 84-7596-080-4.
- Palà, Marina (2000). Calders: els miralls de la ficció: catàleg de l'exposició. Barcelona: Diputació de Barcelona. ISBN 84-7794-731-7.
- Pons, Agustí (1998). Pere Calders, veritat oculta. Barcelona: Edicions 62. ISBN 84-297-4379-0.
- Puig Molist, Carme (2003). Pere Calders i el seu temps. Barcelona: Publicacions de l'Abadia de Montserrat. ISBN 84-8415-466-1.
- Solà i Dachs, Lluís (1991). Dibuixos de guerra. Illustrations by Kalders and Tísner. Barcelona: Editorial La Campana. ISBN 84-86491-50-9.
- Vallverdú, Francesc (1996). Cartes d'amor. Barcelona: Edicions 62. ISBN 978-84-297-4070-7.
