= Ethel Barrymore Theatre =

Broadway theater in Manhattan, New York

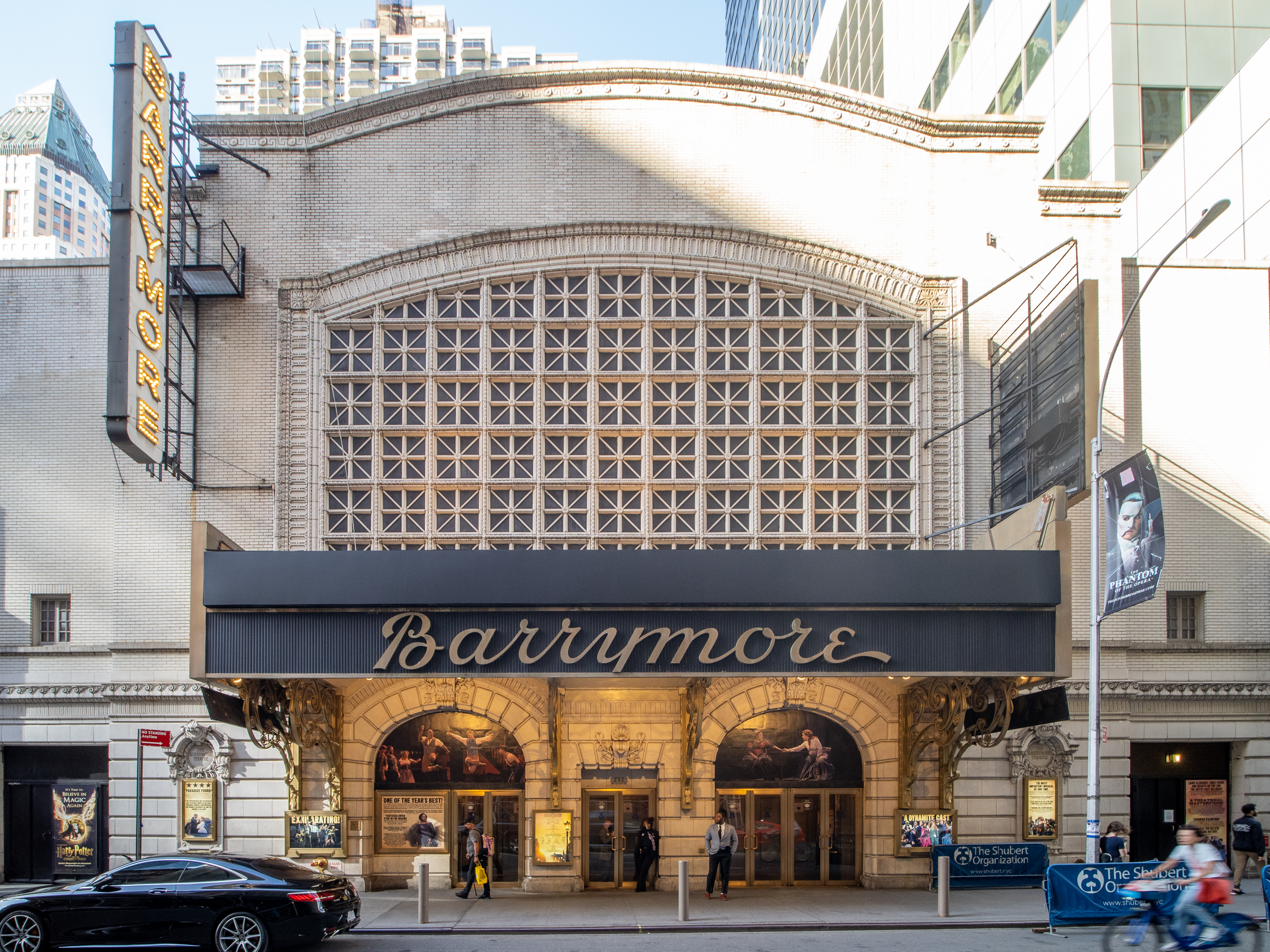
- Interactive map of Ethel Barrymore Theatre
- Address: 243 West 47th Street; Manhattan, New York; United States
- Coordinates: 40°45′36″N 73°59′10″W
- Owner: The Shubert Organization
- Capacity: 1,058
- Type: Broadway
- Production: Here There Are Blueberries

Construction
- Opened: December 20, 1928 (97 years ago)
- Years active: 1928–present
- Architect: Herbert J. Krapp

Website
- Official website

New York City Landmark
- Designated: November 4, 1987
- Reference no.: 1313
- Designated entity: Facade

New York City Landmark
- Designated: November 10, 1987
- Reference no.: 1314
- Designated entity: Auditorium interior

The Ethel Barrymore Theatre is a Broadway theater at 243 West 47th Street in the Theater District of Midtown Manhattan in New York City, New York, U.S. Opened in 1928, it was designed by Herbert J. Krapp in the Elizabethan, Mediterranean, and Adam styles for the Shubert family. The theater, named in honor of actress Ethel Barrymore, has 1,058 seats and is operated by the Shubert Organization. Both the facade and the auditorium interior are New York City landmarks.

The ground-floor facade is made of rusticated blocks of terracotta. The theater's main entrance consists of two archways and a doorway shielded by a marquee. The upper stories contain an arched screen made of terracotta, inspired by Roman baths, which is surrounded by white brick. The auditorium contains ornamental plasterwork, a sloped orchestra level, a large balcony, and a coved ceiling with a 36 ft-wide (11 m) dome. The balcony level contains box seats topped by decorative arches. The theater was also designed with a basement lounge and a now-demolished stage house.

The Shubert brothers developed the Barrymore Theatre after Ethel Barrymore agreed to have the brothers manage her theatrical career. It opened on December 20, 1928, with The Kingdom of God, and was the last pre-Depression house developed by the Shuberts. Ethel Barrymore only worked with the Shuberts until 1932 and last performed in the theater in 1940. The Barrymore has consistently remained in use as a legitimate theater since its opening, hosting plays and musicals; it is one of the few Broadway theaters to have never been sold or renamed. The theater was refurbished in the 1980s and the 2000s.

== Site ==
The Ethel Barrymore Theatre is on 243 West 47th Street, on the north sidewalk between Eighth Avenue and Broadway, near Times Square in the Theater District of Midtown Manhattan in New York City, New York, U.S. The square land lot covers 10,050 ft^{2} (934 m^{2}), with a frontage of 100 ft (30 m) on 47th Street and a depth of 100 feet. The Barrymore shares the block with the Samuel J. Friedman Theatre to the west, the Longacre Theatre to the north, and the Morgan Stanley Building to the east. Other nearby buildings include the Eugene O'Neill Theatre and Walter Kerr Theatre to the north; Crowne Plaza Times Square Manhattan to the northeast; 20 Times Square to the east; the Hotel Edison and Lunt-Fontanne Theatre to the south; and the Lena Horne Theatre and Paramount Hotel to the southwest.

== Design ==
The Ethel Barrymore Theatre was designed by Herbert J. Krapp in several styles and was constructed in 1928 for the Shubert brothers. The theater is named after actress Ethel Barrymore (1879–1959), a prominent member of the Barrymore family of actors, and is operated by the Shubert Organization. The Barrymore has been used continuously as a legitimate house and, unlike most Broadway theaters, has never been sold or renamed since its opening. The Barrymore was the last theater to be built by the Shubert Organization until 2003.

=== Facade ===
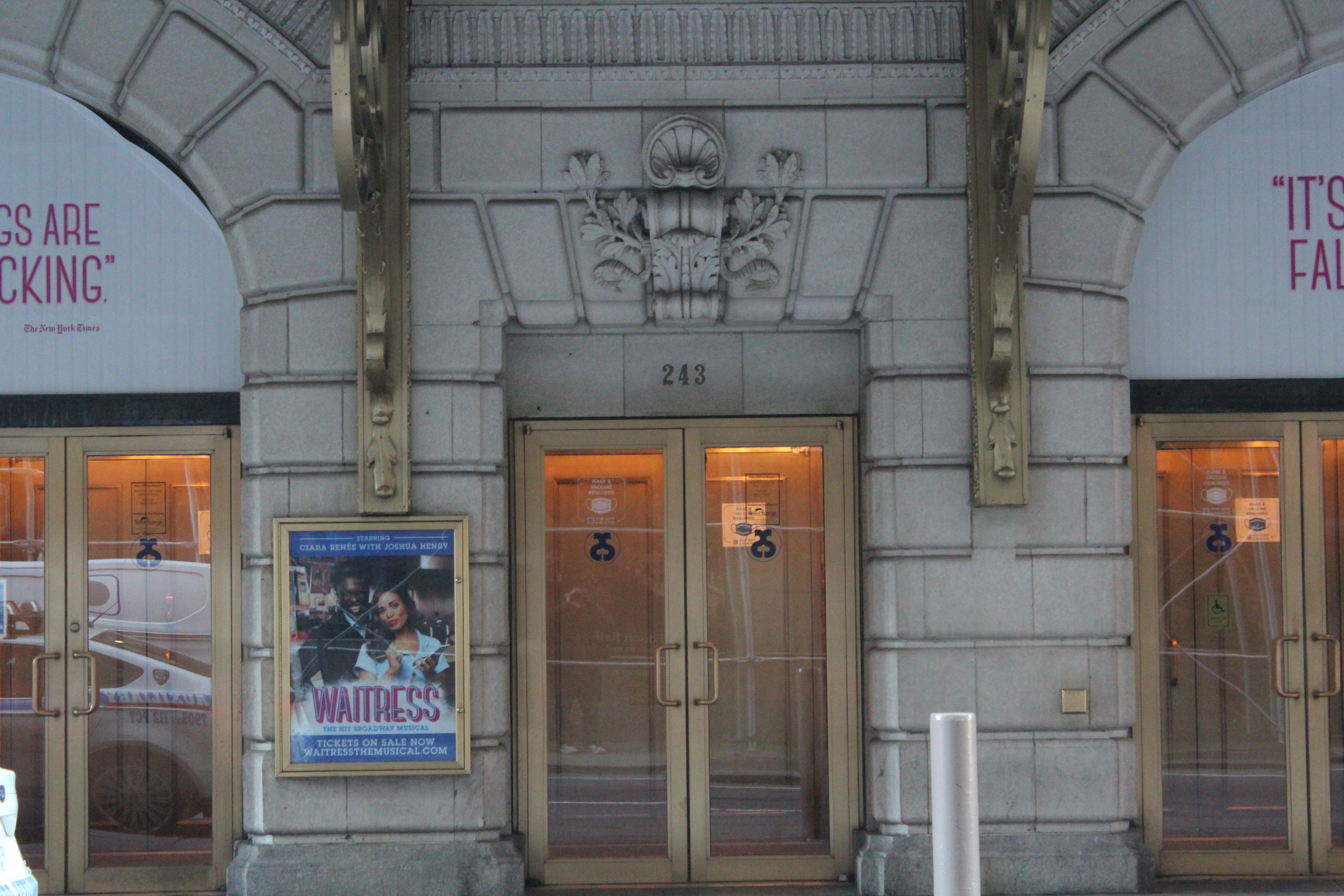
Detail of central entrance

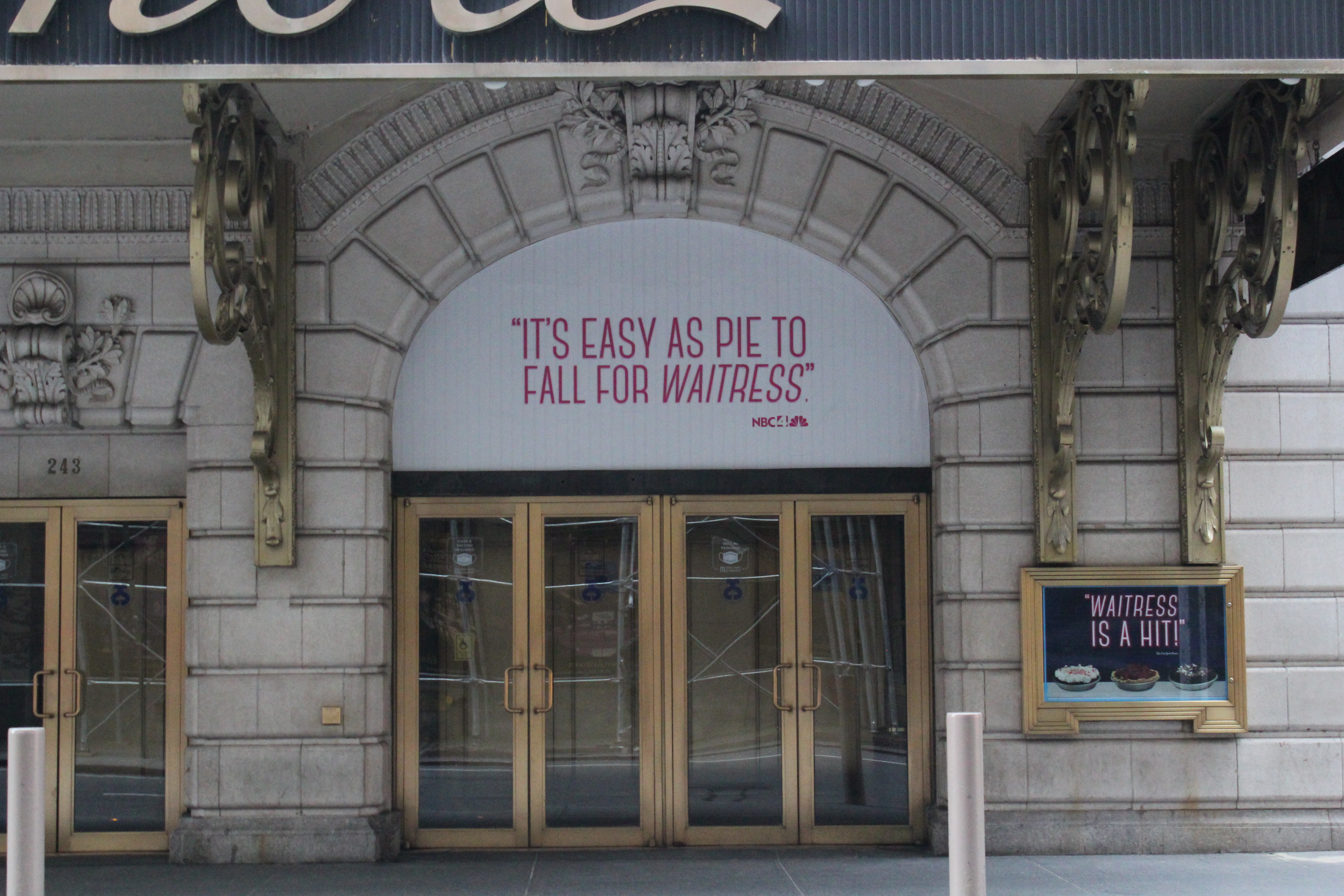
One of the arched entrances

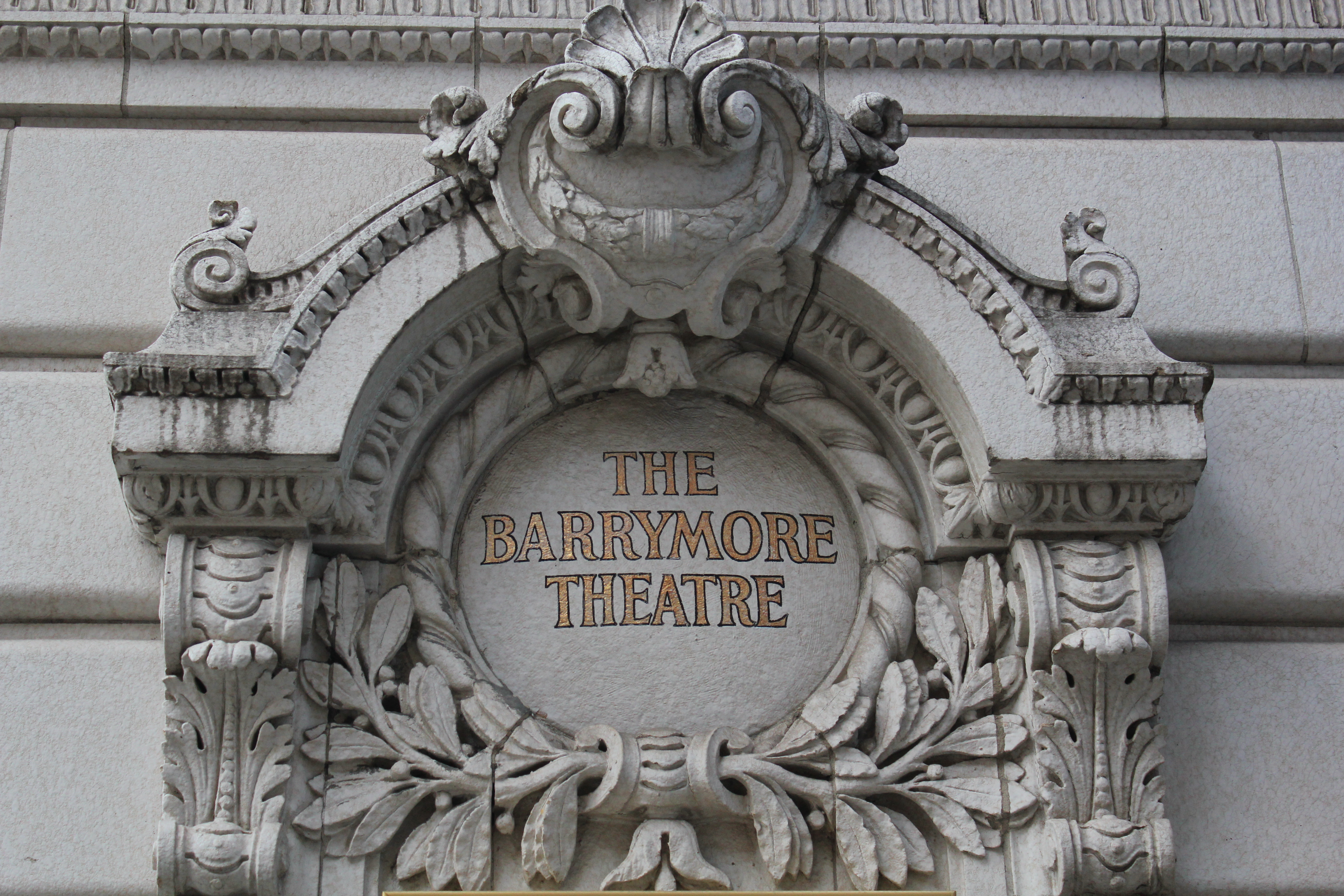
Detail of wreath

The facade is symmetrically arranged. The ground floor is clad in rusticated blocks of terracotta, painted in a limestone color, above a granite water table. At ground level, the auditorium entrance includes two arched openings, each with four aluminum and glass doors. The voussoirs of the arches are made of rusticated blocks, while the keystones at the centers of each arch are shaped like brackets. Within each arch, the spaces above the doors are infilled with black glazed tiles; originally, these spaces were filled with metal tracery. Between the arched doors is a smaller doorway, which is topped by a large keystone. Above all of these openings is a marquee with the name "Barrymore", which is supported by ornate bronze brackets. The presence of the large marquee obscures the contrast between the ground floor and upper stories. The brackets originally supported a smaller bronze-and-glass canopy, which curved upward in front of either arch.

On either side of the doors are terracotta niches with bronze-framed sign boards. Above the signboards are terracotta wreaths, which surround circular panels with the gilded letters "The Barrymore Theatre". Each wreath is topped by a curved pediment. The western and eastern portions of the facade are recessed slightly and contain recessed openings. The opening to the east is marked as the stage door. A frieze, decorated with leaf and wave moldings, runs above the first floor. To the east, there was originally a stage house with fire escapes on its facade, but this has since been replaced with the Morgan Stanley Building.

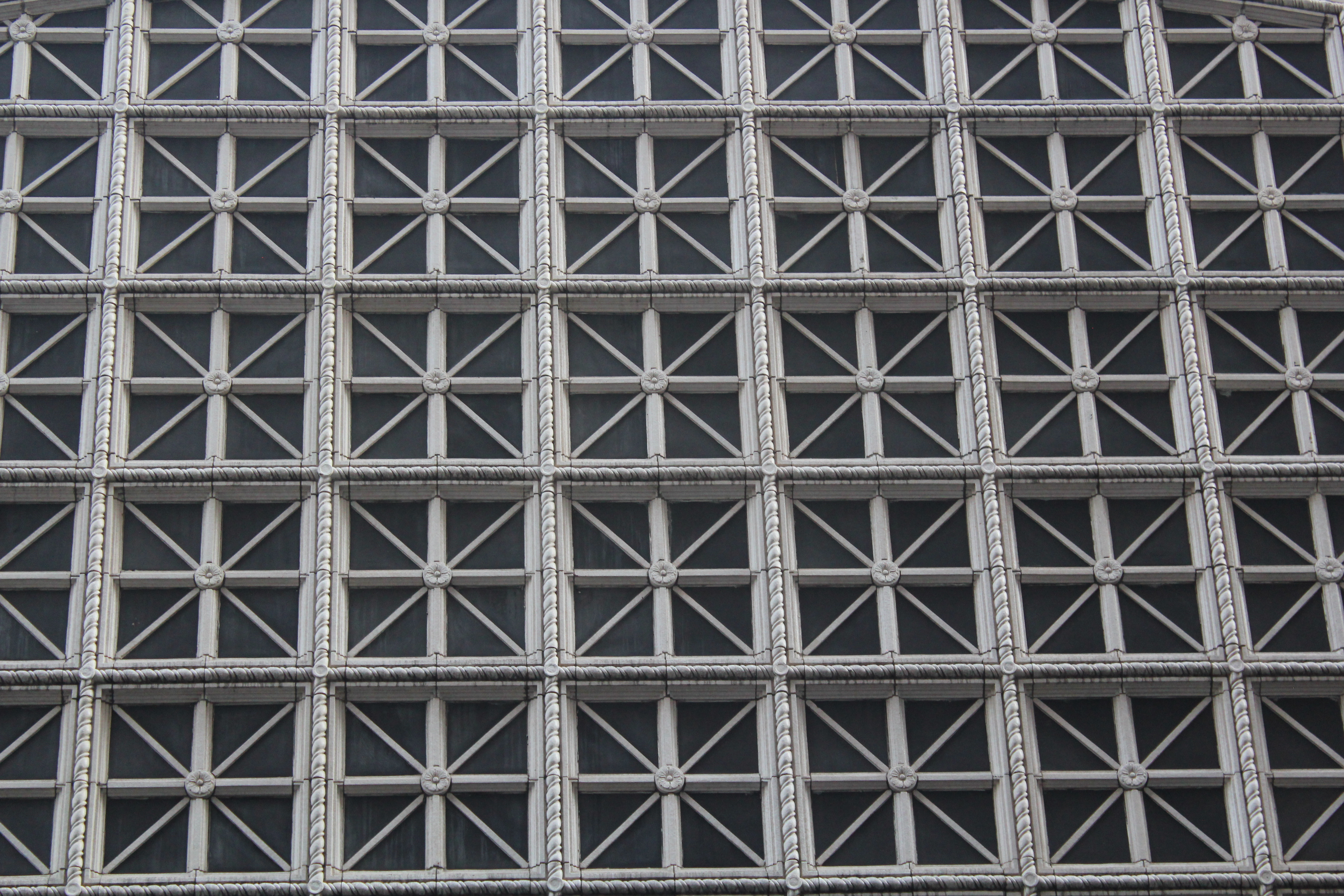
Upper-story detail

The upper stories are faced in bonded glazed-white brick. The central part of the facade includes a terracotta screen with an Ancient Roman–inspired pattern, surrounded by a cord molding. The screen includes a grid of squares, each of which contain central medallions with bars radiating in eight directions. To the left of the screen, the wall contains a sign with the name "Barrymore" and a metal fire escape. A metal sign hangs from the facade to the right. The top of the screen curves upward in a manner resembling a proscenium arch, and a brick parapet rises above the screen. A Greek key frieze and a cornice with talon moldings runs above the entire facade. Contemporary media from the theater's opening cited the top of the facade as being 62 ft (19 m) above the sidewalk, while the screen was 52 ft (16 m) wide.

=== Auditorium ===
The auditorium has an orchestra level, one balcony, boxes and a stage behind the proscenium arch. The space is designed with plaster decorations in low relief. The auditorium is shaped almost as a square. According to the Shubert Organization, the auditorium has 1,058 seats; meanwhile, Playbill cites 1,039 seats and The Broadway League cites 1,096 seats. The physical seats are divided into 582 seats in the orchestra, 196 at the front of the balcony, 256 at the rear of the balcony, and 24 in the boxes. There were originally 1,100 seats, divided into 570 in the orchestra, 494 in the balcony, and 36 in the boxes.

The seats were designed to be "unusually comfortable", with steel backs and bottoms. A source from the theater's opening cited the auditorium as having an old-gold and brown color scheme. The interior uses a combination of Elizabethan, Mediterranean, and Adam-style design motifs.

==== Seating areas ====
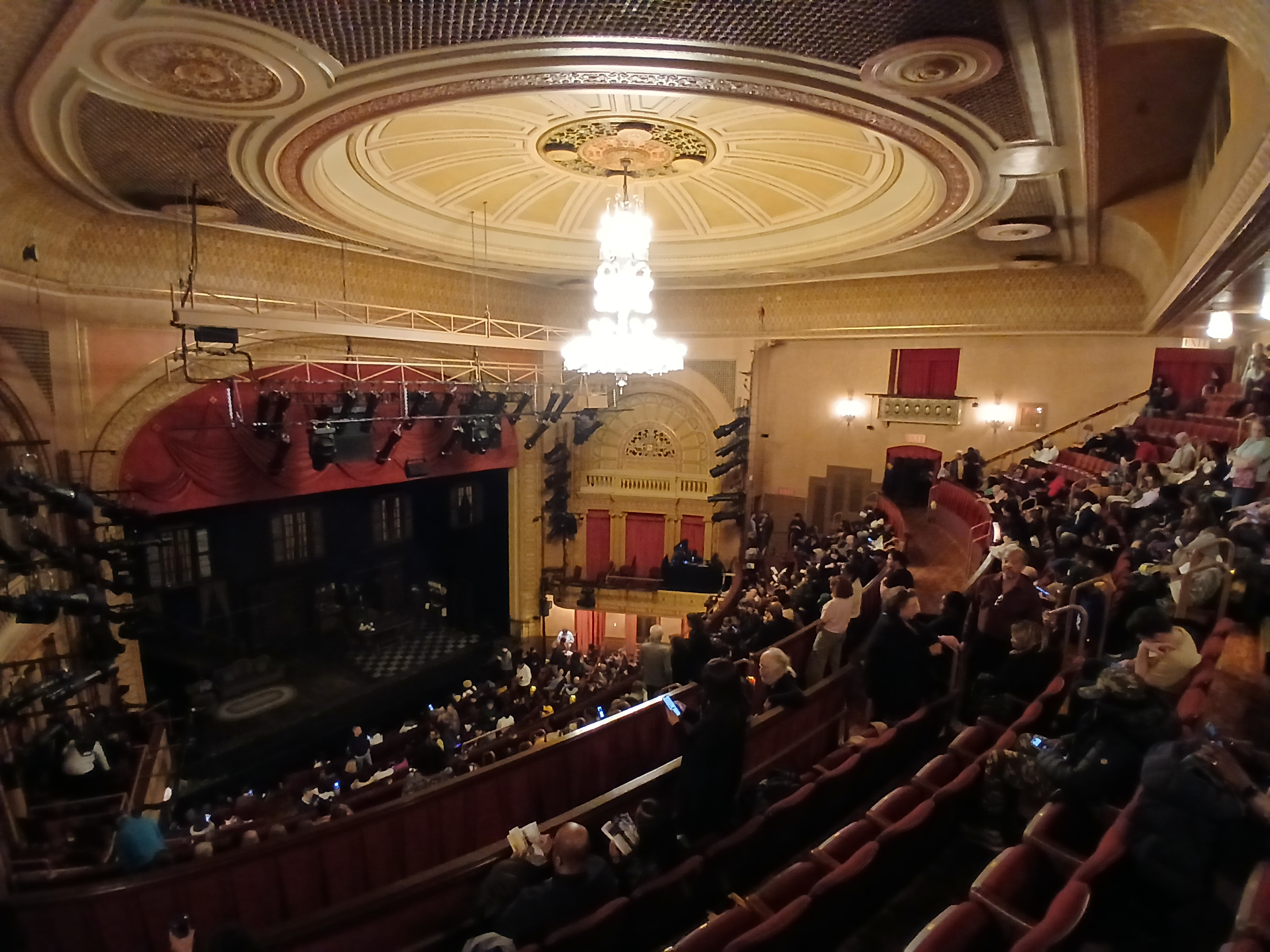
View of the balcony toward the auditorium's right wall, with the proscenium arch at left

The rear of the orchestra contains a promenade. The rear wall of the promenade contains three doorways, above which is a frieze. The promenade ceiling is curved and contains Elizabethan strapwork patterns. There is a wrought iron balustrade between the orchestra promenade and the last row of orchestra seating. Two staircases lead from either end of the promenade to the balcony level; they contain wrought-iron railings with shield and strapwork motifs. The orchestra is raked, sloping down toward the stage. The side walls of the orchestra contain a wainscoting that is divided into panels. The walls were originally painted cinnamon and gold. There are lighting sconces on the walls.

The balcony level is cantilevered above the orchestra and is divided into front and rear sections by an aisle halfway across its depth. The crossover aisle connects to segmentally arched exit doors on both of the side walls. There are console brackets above the arched exit doors, which support terraces that project slightly from an opening on either wall. The rest of the balcony's side walls are made of simple plaster and contain wall sconces. The front rail of the balcony contains high-relief strapwork patterns, which have been covered over with light boxes. The underside of the balcony has plasterwork panels with crystal light fixtures suspended from medallions. The original lighting fixtures, consisting of inverted bowls of cut glass, have since been replaced. Air-conditioning vents are placed along some of the panels under the balcony, as well as at the balcony's rear. There is a technical booth behind the balcony's rear wall.

On either side of the proscenium are three boxes, raised about 9 ft (2.7 m) from the orchestra floor, which curve toward the side walls. At orchestra level is a wainscoted wall interrupted by three segmental-arched openings, one beneath each box. The undersides of the boxes contain moldings and crystal light fixtures similar to those on the balcony. The box fronts are decorated with three Elizabethan-style plasterwork bands. From bottom to top, the bands depict shields with putti's faces; rosettes; and strapwork around shields. Immediately behind the boxes are six gold-colored, fluted pilasters with Ionic capitals. There are half-columns in front of the pilasters that flank the center box. Above the pilasters is an architrave with plaster strapwork reliefs, as well as a balustrade containing vase-shaped balusters. There is a lunette above the balustrade; it includes a square shield motif, which is connected by latticework bands to sphinxes on either side. The lunette is surrounded by strapwork bands and several concentric semicircular arches. The semicircular arches have design motifs such as shells, shields, anthemia, and half-columns. The arches, combined with the lunette, constitute a sunburst pattern. The boxes and semicircular arches are surrounded by a plaster frame.

==== Other design features ====
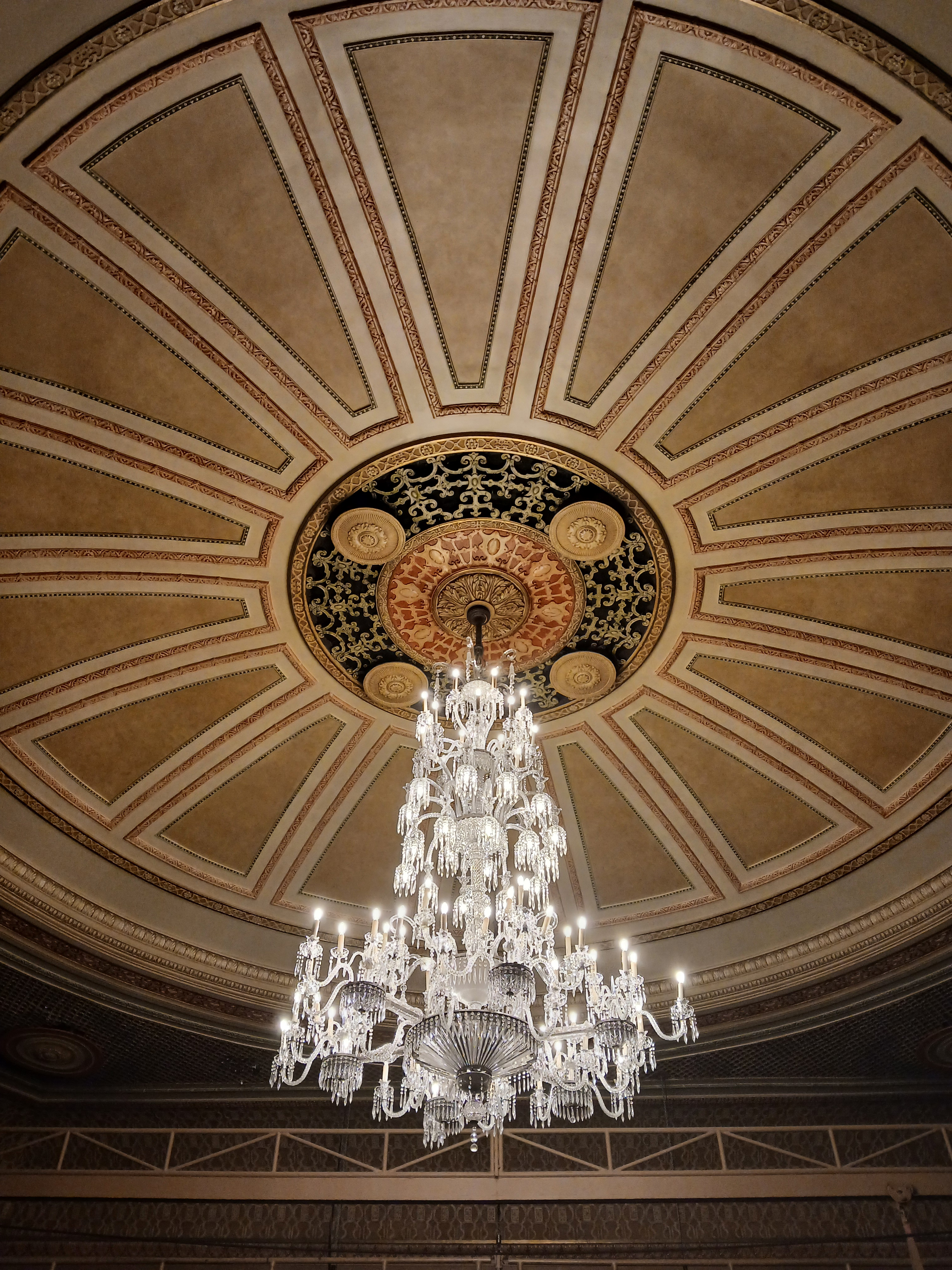
Detail of the domed ceiling

Next to the boxes is a three-centered proscenium arch. The archway is surrounded by a wide band with strapwork motifs, with narrow bands of leaves on either side. The spandrels, above the corners of the proscenium arch, contain decorative motifs. The proscenium measures 24 ft 10 in (7.57 m) high and 39 ft 3 in (11.96 m) wide. The depth of the auditorium to the proscenium is 28 ft 3 in (8.61 m), while the depth to the front of the stage is 31 ft 3 in (9.53 m). According to sources from the theater's completion, the proscenium opening was 40 ft (12 m) wide, while the arch itself was 34 ft (10 m) high. As arranged, the stage itself measured 28 ft (8.5 m) deep by 81 ft (25 m) wide. The stage gridiron was placed 65 ft (20 m) above the stage. There are traps throughout the entire stage, as well as a counterweight fly system.

The ceiling rises 49 ft (15 m) from the floor of the orchestra. The coved ceiling contains a dome at its center, measuring 36 ft (11 m) wide. At the center of the dome is a grilled centerpiece, which is surrounded by several Elizabethan-style circles, as well as four medallions placed at 90-degree angles. A glass chandelier hangs from the center of the dome. The rest of the dome is divided into wedge-shaped sections, which are arranged in a circular pattern around the centerpiece. Outside of the dome, the coved ceiling contains latticework panels, surrounded by a strapwork pattern. Where the coved ceiling curves onto the side walls, there is a band with water-leaf motifs. Originally, this band was colored in green, gold, and gray.

=== Other interior spaces ===
The theater was built with a general lounge in the basement, which measured 25 by 50 ft (7.6 by 15.2 m). Separate spaces in the lounge were provided for women and men, and there was also a telephone booth. According to contemporary news articles, the basement lounge was decorated with an ivory-colored strapwork ceiling, modeled after English designs. The lounge had antique Elizabethan furniture, a mulberry-and-taupe carpet, and walls with an "old English texture in antique color". When the theater opened, Gilbert Miller lent a bronze bust of Ethel Barrymore, which was designed by A. C. Laddy. The basement also had a large dressing room for choruses.

On the first floor, Ethel Barrymore had her own modern-style reception and dressing room. The second floor had a chorus room and a smaller dressing room. The theater was built with three additional floors, each with four dressing rooms.

== History ==
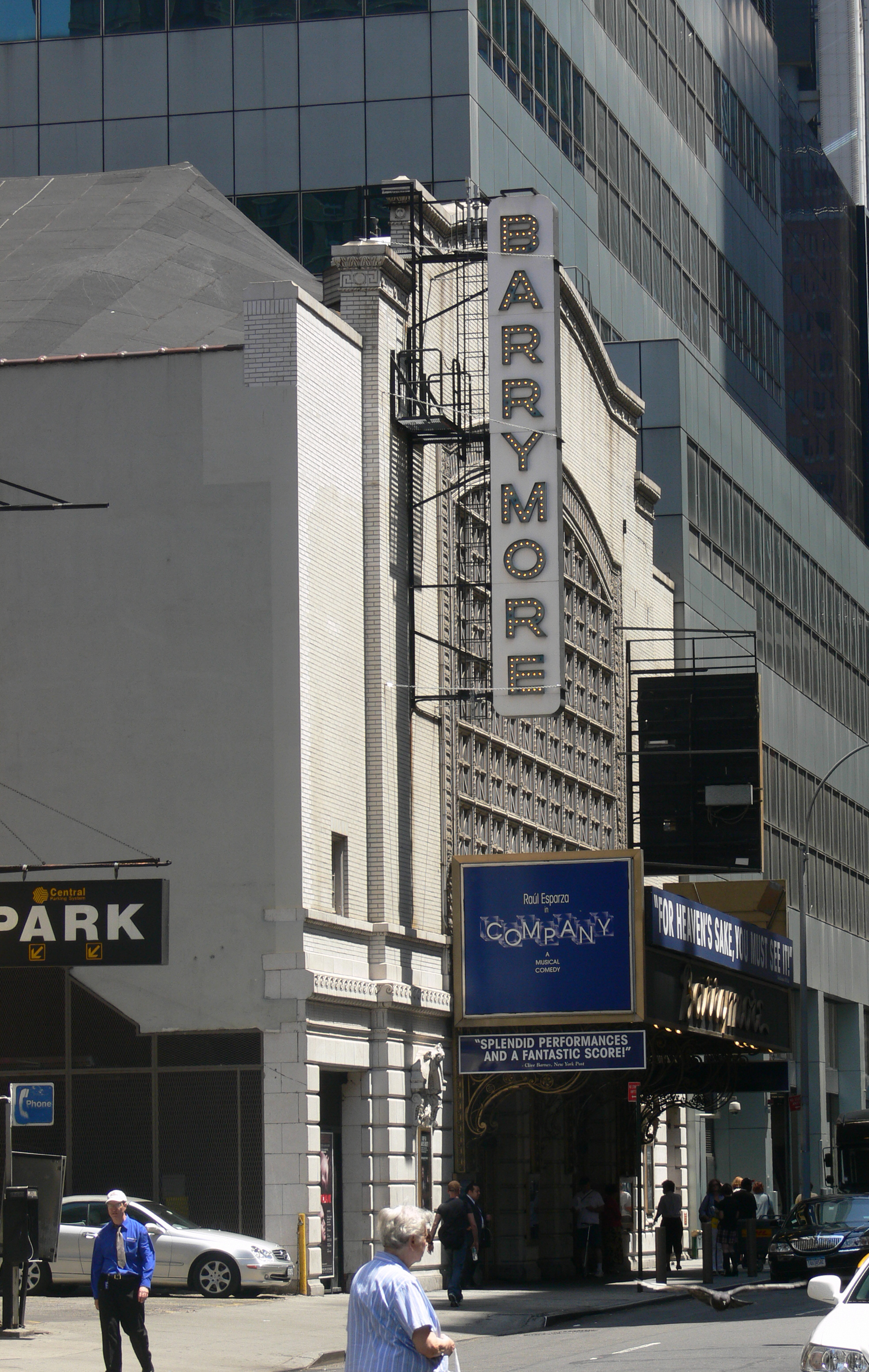
Seen from the east

Times Square became the epicenter for large-scale theater productions between 1900 and the Great Depression. During the 1900s and 1910s, many theaters in Midtown Manhattan were developed by the Shubert brothers, one of the major theatrical syndicates of the time. The Shuberts originated from Syracuse, New York, and expanded downstate into New York City in the first decade of the 20th century. The brothers controlled a quarter of all plays and three-quarters of theatrical ticket sales in the U.S. by 1925. The Shuberts continued to build Broadway theaters in the 1920s, with the construction of four theaters on 48th and 49th Streets, (Note: The Ambassador, Forrest (now O'Neill), and Ritz (now Walter Kerr) theaters still survive. The other was the 49th Street Theatre at 235 West 49th Street, which was demolished in 1940.) as well as the Imperial Theatre on 45th Street.

=== Development and early years ===
In 1927, playwright Zoe Akins told Ethel Barrymore about an offer from the Shubert brothers, who proposed developing a Broadway theater and naming it in her honor if she agreed to be represented by the Shuberts. Barrymore agreed, and the Shuberts hired Krapp to design the theater, construction of which started in late April or early May 1928. At the time, Barrymore was 48 years old (Note: The actress celebrated her 49th birthday on August 15, 1928, while the theater was under construction.) and a prominent theatrical personality; she had been represented by the Frohman brothers for almost her entire career. In September 1928, Lee Shubert announced that the theater would open the next month, with Barrymore starring in G. Martinez Sierra's play The Kingdom of God. The theater's completion was delayed, prompting The Kingdom of God to go on a several-week tour.

The Barrymore Theatre ultimately opened on December 20, 1928. During the opening, which was attended by many New York City socialites, Ethel Barrymore received seven curtain calls before she was able to give a speech thanking the Shuberts. The Barrymore Theatre received so many items of Barrymore memorabilia that, within a month of the theater's opening, the Shuberts considered creating a library to house these gifts. Ethel Barrymore appeared at her eponymous theater again in 1929, when she co-starred with Louis Calhern in The Love Duel, which ran for 88 performances. The Barrymore's next several plays did not feature Ethel Barrymore. These included a transfer of John Drinkwater's comedy Bird in Hand in September 1929, as well as Death Takes a Holiday that December, the latter of which had a comparatively long run of 181 performances.

=== 1930s and 1940s ===
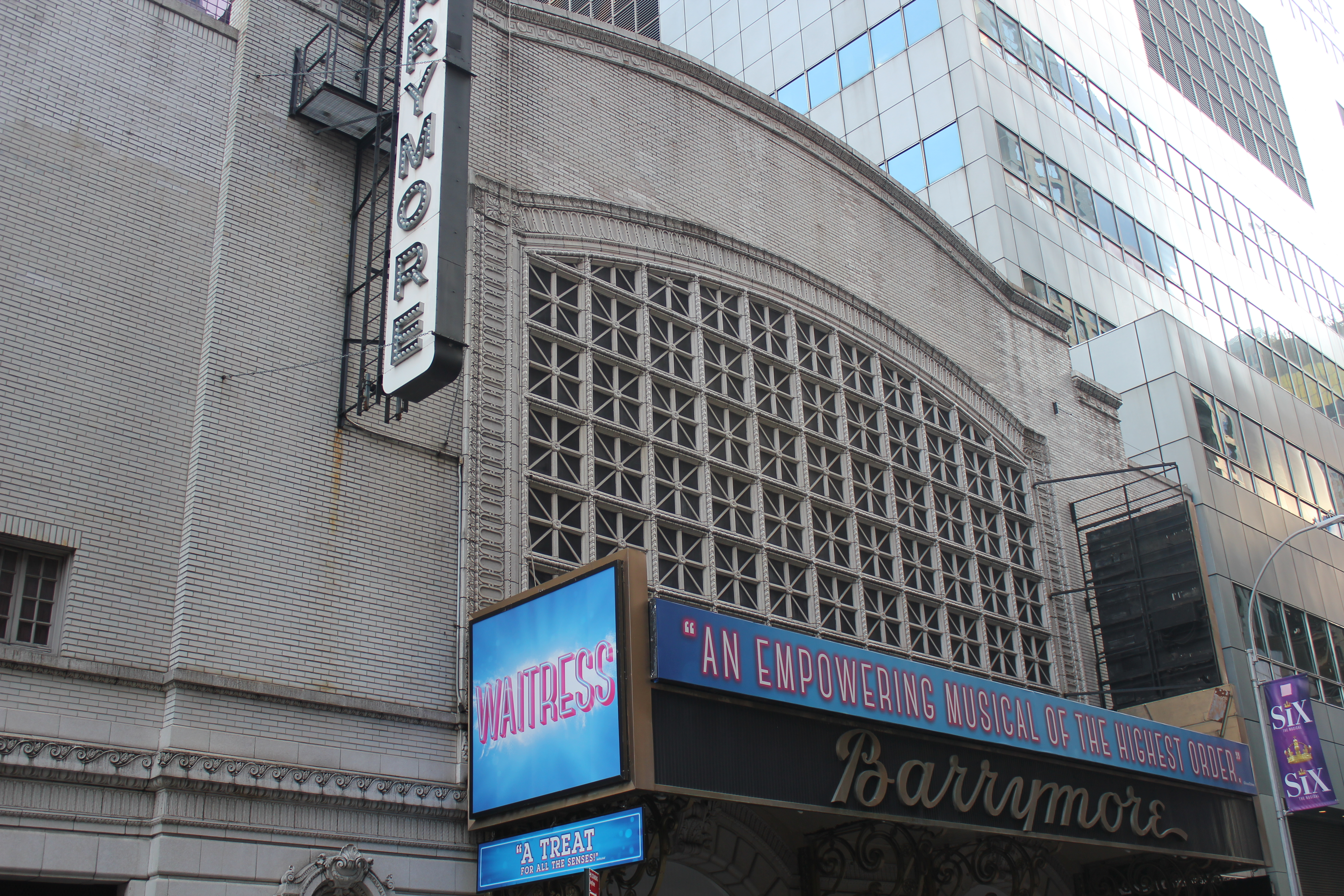
Upper part of the facade

In 1930, the theater staged the comedy Topaze and the romance His Majesty's Car. Ethel Barrymore's next appearance at the Barrymore was in the short-lived blackface comedy Scarlet Sister Mary in November 1930, which saw the Broadway debut of the actress's daughter, Ethel Barrymore Colt. More successful was The Truth Game with Ivor Novello and Billie Burke, which opened that December and had 105 performances. In 1931, the Barrymore hosted Mélo with Edna Best and Basil Rathbone, followed that November by Ethel Barrymore in The School for Scandal, whose son John Drew Colt made his first Broadway appearance in that show. The Barrymore's productions in 1932 included a 144-performance run of Whistling in the Dark, as well as the short-lived comedy Here Today and a transfer of There's Always Juliet. The same year, Ethel Barrymore stopped performing under the Shuberts' management, prompting the brothers to remove her first name from the marquee. At the end of 1932, Fred Astaire and Claire Luce starred in the musical Gay Divorce, where Astaire performed without his sister Adele for the first time.

The theater's plays in 1933 included Design for Living with Alfred Lunt, Lynn Fontanne, and Noël Coward, as well as the mystery Ten Minute Alibi and the drama Jezebel. The Barrymore went into receivership the same year, and the receiver deeded the theater to the Barrymore Theater Corporation. The Barrymore had seven flops in 1934. Coward, Lunt, and Fontanne returned in January 1935 for the play Point Valaine, which lasted for only 56 performances. The Barrymore hosted a transfer of the play Distaff Side that March, and Philip Merivale and Gladys Cooper staged revivals of Shakespeare's Macbeth and Othello that October. The play Parnell opened in November 1935 and ran for 98 performances; it was followed by a double bill of Irwin Shaw's Bury the Dead and Prelude in April 1936, then Emlyn Williams's Night Must Fall that September. Clare Boothe Luce's The Women opened with an all-female cast in December 1936 and was a hit, running for 657 performances.

The Playwrights' Company next presented the musical Knickerbocker Holiday with Walter Huston in 1938. The next year, the Barrymore hosted No Time for Comedy with Katharine Cornell, Laurence Olivier, and Margalo Gillmore for 185 performances, and Key Largo with Paul Muni, Uta Hagen, and José Ferrer for 105 performances. In 1940, Ethel Barrymore appeared in the short-lived play An International Incident, her last appearance at her namesake theater. The musical Pal Joey, featuring Gene Kelly and Vivienne Segal with a score by Rodgers and Hart, opened later that year and ran for 270 performances before transferring to another theater. The next hit was Best Foot Forward with Rosemary Lane in 1941, which had 326 performances. Walter Kerr and Leo Brady's Count Me In had a short run in 1942, but Anton Chekhov's The Three Sisters with Katharine Cornell was more successful, with 123 performances. Another success was the war drama Tomorrow the World in 1943, which had 499 performances.

Revivals predominated at the theater in the mid-1940s. These included The Barretts of Wimpole Street and Pygmalion in 1945, as well as The Duchess of Malfi and Cyrano de Bergerac in 1946. In 1947, Gian Carlo Menotti presented a double bill of the musical plays The Telephone and The Medium at the theater, which ran for 212 performances. Later that year, the Barrymore presented Tennessee Williams's A Streetcar Named Desire, originally featuring Marlon Brando, Kim Hunter, Karl Malden, and Jessica Tandy. The play, one of several that Irene Mayer Selznick produced at the theater, ran for 855 performances over the next two years.

=== 1950s to 1970s ===
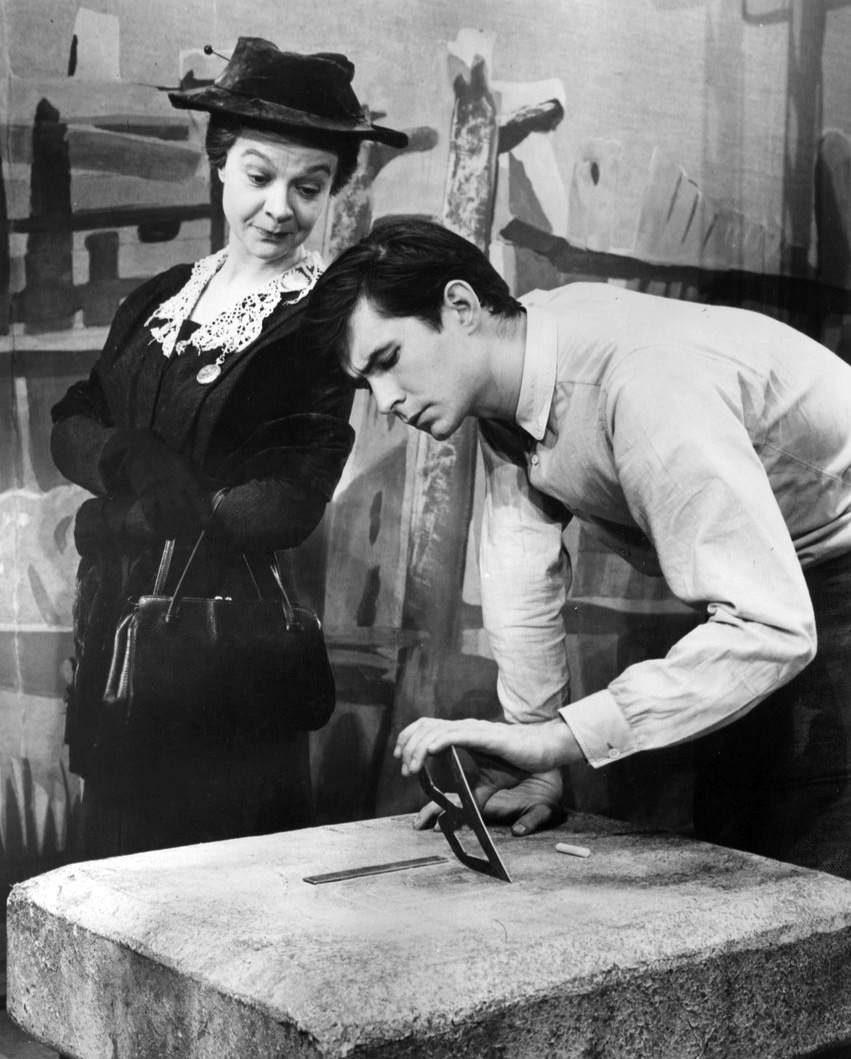
Look Homeward, Angel being performed in 1958

Menotti hosted another show at the Barrymore in 1950: the opera The Consul with Patricia Neway and Marie Powers. Later that year, the Barrymore hosted Bell, Book and Candle with husband-and-wife team Rex Harrison and Lilli Palmer, which ran for 233 performances. Another married couple starred in another hit in 1951: The Fourposter with Jessica Tandy and Hume Cronyn, who stayed for 632 performances. This was followed in 1953 by a transfer of Misalliance. The same year, the Barrymore staged Tea and Sympathy with Deborah Kerr, Leif Erickson, and John Kerr, which had 712 total performances. Shows in 1955 included The Desperate Hours; a personal appearance by Marcel Marceau; and the drama The Chalk Garden. Leonard Sillman's revue New Faces of 1956 ran for 220 performances, featuring Maggie Smith in her Broadway debut, as well as female impersonator T. C. Jones. Ketti Frings's adaptation of Look Homeward, Angel premiered in 1957 and ran 530 performances.

A Raisin in the Sun opened in March 1959, staying for seven months and running 530 total performances. When Ethel Barrymore died in June of that year, the theater's lights were dimmed in its namesake's honor. Another comedy, A Majority of One with Gertrude Berg and Cedric Hardwicke, moved to the Barrymore later that year and ran through June 1960. The Barrymore's productions of the early 1960s included Critic's Choice with Henry Fonda and Mildred Natwick in 1960; The Complaisant Lover with Michael Redgrave, Richard Johnson, and Googie Withers in 1961; and A Gift of Time with Fonda and Olivia de Havilland in 1962. Later in the decade, the theater hosted The Amen Corner in 1965, followed the next year by Wait Until Dark and a limited engagement by Les Ballets Africains. This was followed in 1967 by Peter Shaffer's twin production of Black Comedy and White Lies. The Barrymore's last hit of the 1960s was a revival of The Front Page in 1969.

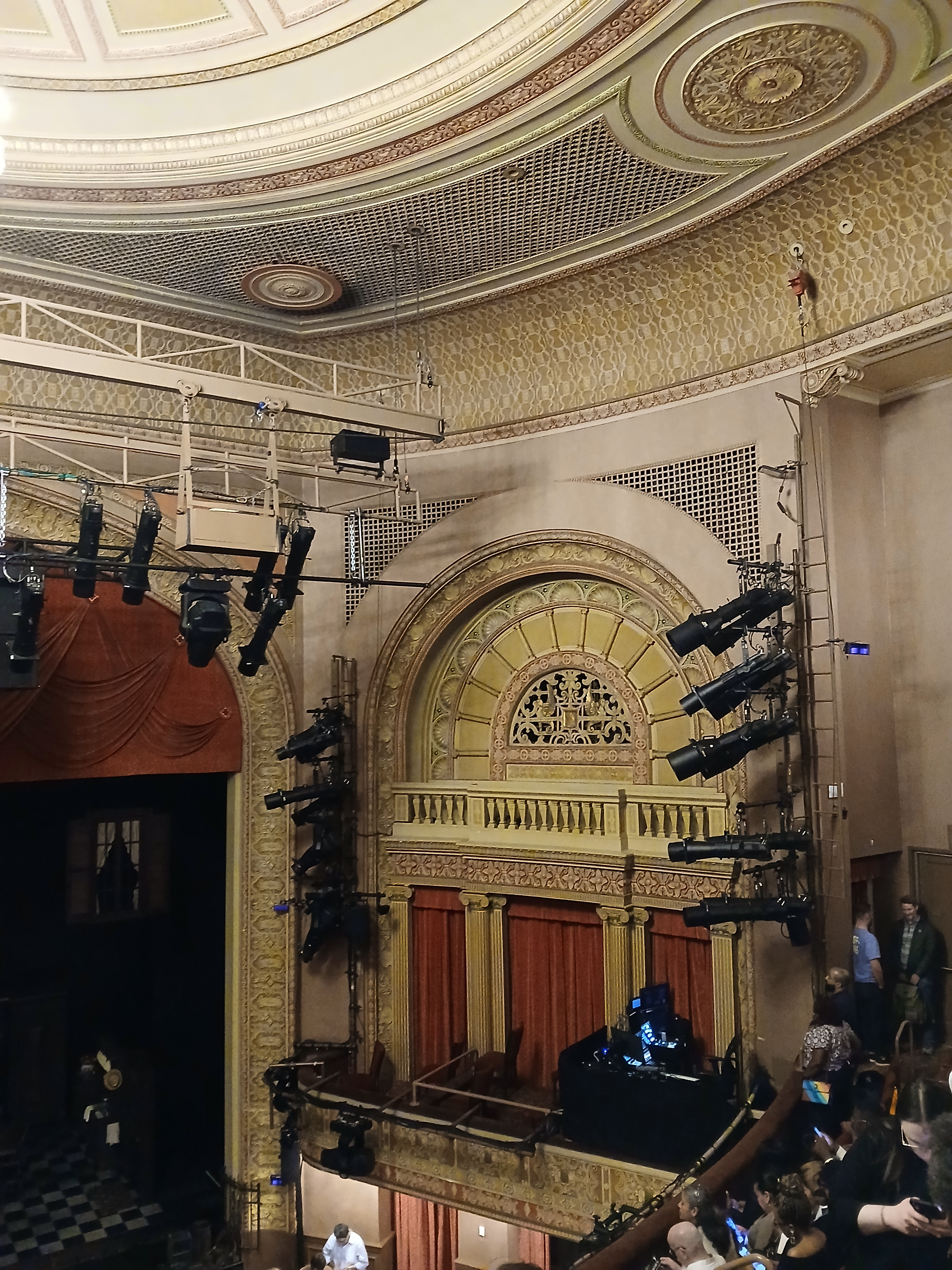
Detail of the right-side box seat

The Barrymore hosted several hits in the 1970s, several of which won Tony Awards and other accolades. In 1970, Conduct Unbecoming opened at the Barrymore, featuring Michael Barrington and Jeremy Clyde. The next year, Alec McCowen appeared in The Philanthropist, as well as Melvin Van Peebles's musical Ain't Supposed to Die a Natural Death. The New Phoenix Repertory Company premiered at the Barrymore in late 1973, with three works: The Visit, Chemin de Fer, and Holiday. This was followed in 1974 by Noël Coward in Two Keys with Tandy, Cronyn, and Anne Baxter, a double bill of Coward's plays A Song at Twilight and Come Into the Garden, Maud. The Barrymore hosted the play Travesties with John Wood in 1975, as well as American Buffalo with Robert Duvall and I Love My Wife in 1977. The Barrymore's last hit of the decade was the 1979 play Romantic Comedy, featuring Mia Farrow and Anthony Perkins. During the run of Romantic Comedy, the Barrymore Theatre became one of the first theaters to distribute electronic headsets to help hard-of-hearing visitors. The theater also hosted a party in December 1979 to celebrate what would have been Ethel Barrymore's birthday.

=== 1980s and 1990s ===
The Barrymore continued to host hits in the early 1980s. These included Lunch Hour, which opened in 1980 with Gilda Radner and Sam Waterston, followed in 1981 by The West Side Waltz with Katharine Hepburn and Dorothy Loudon. Hume Cronyn returned to the Barrymore in 1982, making his playwriting debut with Foxfire, in which he costarred with Jessica Tandy and Keith Carradine. This was followed at the end of 1983 by Baby, which ran for 241 performances. The next year, David Rabe's Hurlyburly transferred from off-Broadway and ran for 343 performances. The Barrymore's productions in 1986 included the solo show Lillian with Zoe Caldwell, as well as Social Security, the latter of which ran for 385 performances through 1987. The August Wilson musical Joe Turner's Come and Gone opened at the Barrymore in 1988. The following year, the Barrymore hosted Metamorphosis with Mikhail Baryshnikov, as well as a 12-performance run of David Hare's The Secret Rapture. During the late 1980s, the Shuberts renovated the Barrymore as part of a restoration program for their Broadway theaters, and the Shuberts also sold the Barrymore's air rights for development.

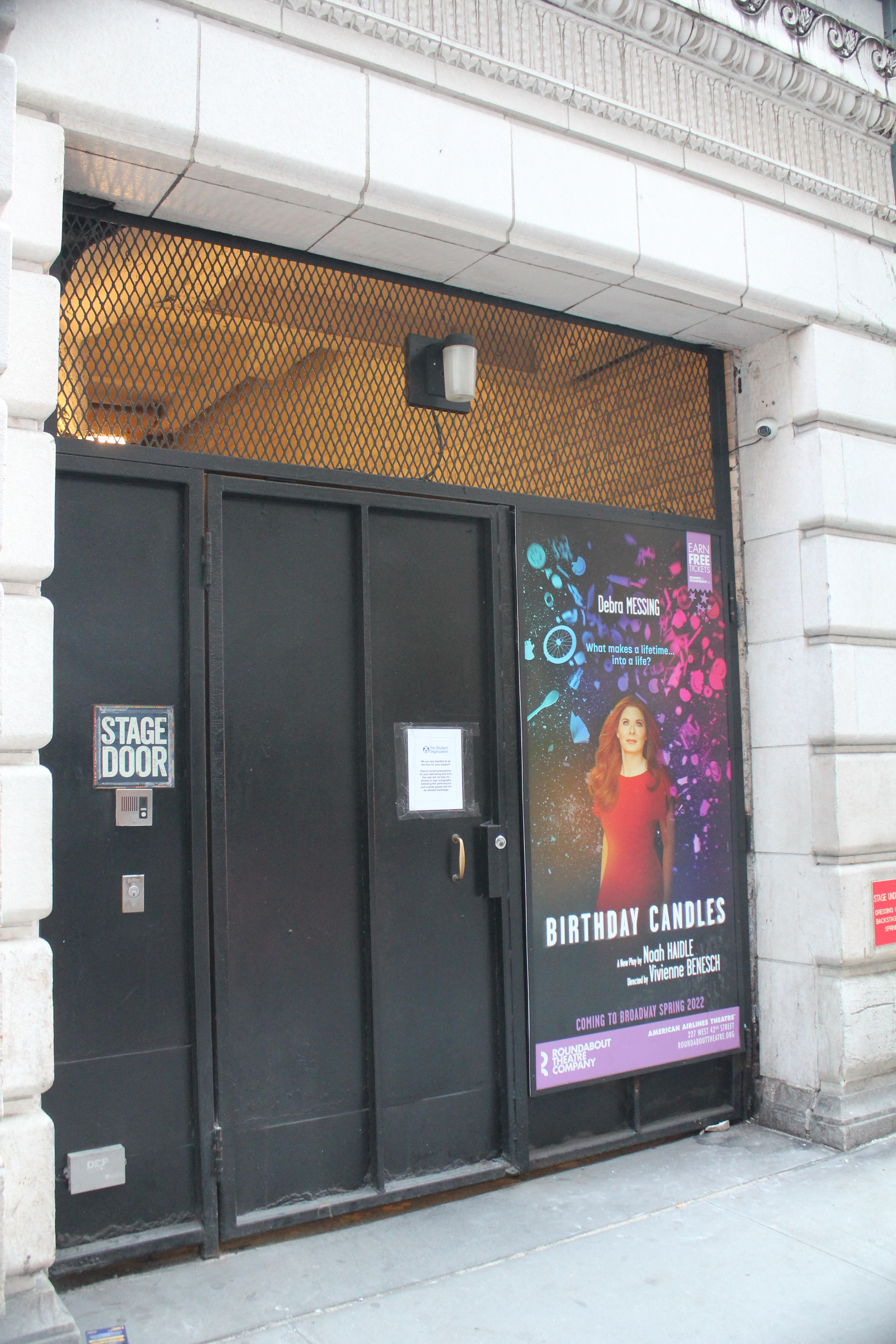
Stage door

The New York City Landmarks Preservation Commission (LPC) had started to consider protecting the Barrymore as a landmark in 1982, with discussions continuing over the next several years. The LPC designated the Barrymore's facade as a landmark on November 4, 1987, followed by the interior on November 10. (Note: The LPC has 11 commissioners, and a landmark status is granted to a building if at least six commissioners vote in favor. Only six commissioners were present at the November 4 meeting, so they had to unanimously agree on any votes; this happened with the exterior but not the interior. Of the ten commissioners at the November 10 meeting, six voted in favor of interior landmark status.) This was part of the commission's wide-ranging effort in 1987 to grant landmark status to Broadway theaters. The New York City Board of Estimate ratified the designations in March 1988. The Shuberts, the Nederlanders, and Jujamcyn collectively sued the LPC in June 1988 to overturn the landmark designations of 22 theaters, including the Barrymore, on the merit that the designations severely limited the extent to which the theaters could be modified. The lawsuit was escalated to the New York Supreme Court and the Supreme Court of the United States, but these designations were ultimately upheld in 1992.

In 1990, the play Lettice and Lovage opened at the Barrymore, featuring Margaret Tyzack and Maggie Smith from the West End version of the play. The next year, the Lincoln Center Theater brought Mule Bone, a never-performed play written in 1930 by Langston Hughes and Zora Neale Hurston; it ran at the Barrymore for 67 performances. A limited revival of A Streetcar Named Desire, featuring Alec Baldwin and Jessica Lange, opened in 1992. Afterward, the off-Broadway hit The Sisters Rosensweig moved to the Barrymore in 1993, with 556 Broadway performances. The play Indiscretions opened in 1995 and had 220 performances; it was followed the next year by a 306-performance revival of Oscar Wilde's An Ideal Husband. Cy Coleman's off-off-Broadway musical The Life transferred to the Barrymore in 1997 and saw 465 performances. The Barrymore next hosted a revival of the Greek tragedy Electra in 1998, then the West End hit Amy's View and the musical Putting It Together in 1999.

=== 2000s to present ===
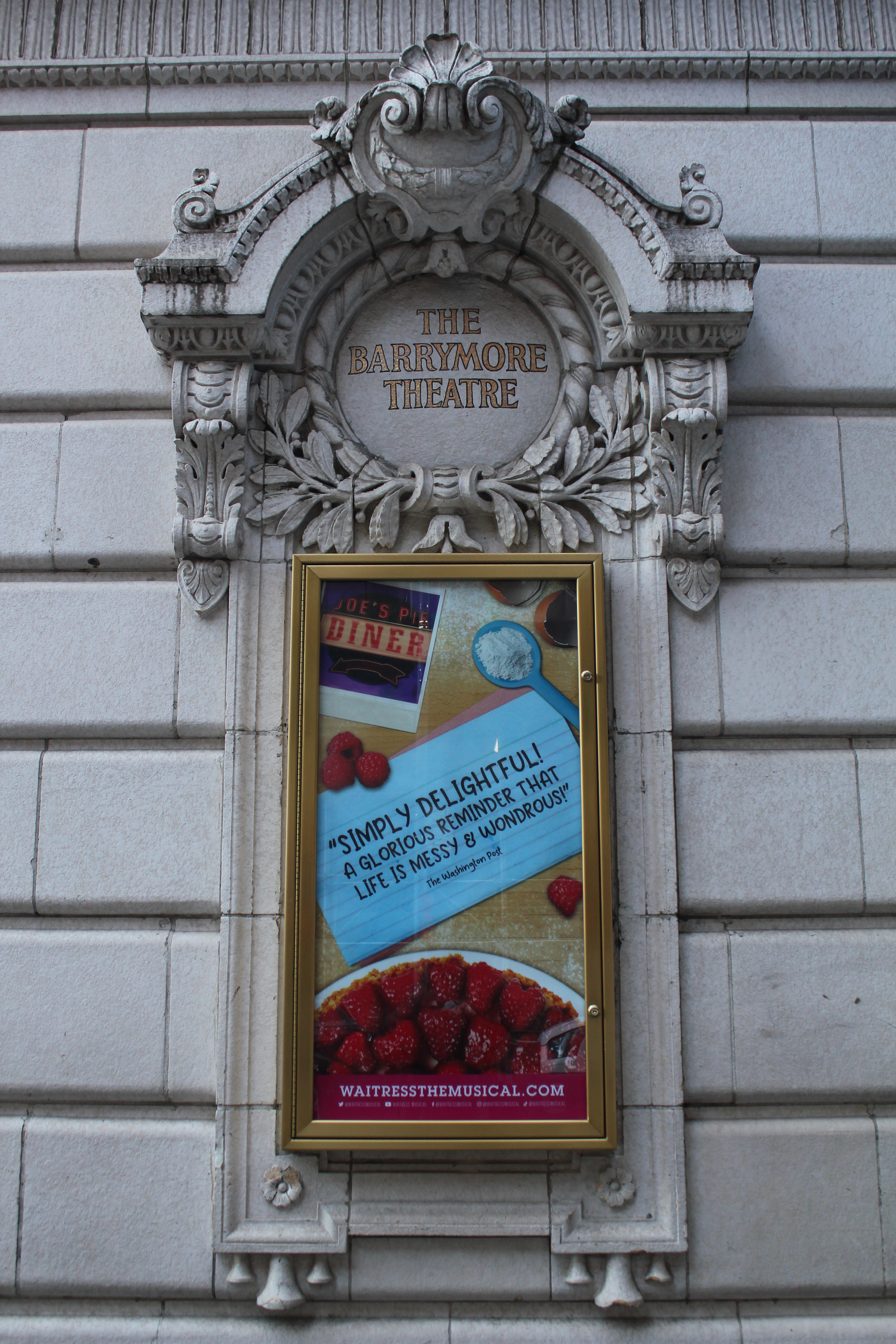
Sign board beside the theater

The Donmar Warehouse's production of The Real Thing and the Manhattan Theatre Club's version of The Tale of the Allergist's Wife were both performed at the Barrymore in 2000. The 777-performance run of The Tale of the Allergist's Wife was followed by shorter runs of Imaginary Friends in 2002, Salome in 2003, and Sly Fox in 2004. As part of a settlement with the United States Department of Justice in 2003, the Shuberts agreed to improve disabled access at their 16 landmarked Broadway theaters, including the Barrymore. The Barrymore Theatre was then renovated for $9 million in 2004. Next came a revival of Tennessee Williams's The Glass Menagerie in 2005 and the short-lived musical Ring of Fire in 2006. Later in 2006, a revival of Stephen Sondheim's Company opened at the Barrymore, running for 247 performances. The band Duran Duran, performing its album Red Carpet Massacre in November 2007, was forced to relocate due to the 2007 Broadway stagehand strike. The Barrymore's exterior was renovated as part of a two-year project that was completed in 2008.

The Barrymore hosted three David Mamet plays in the late 2000s: November and Speed-the-Plow in 2008, as well as Race in 2009. Eugène Ionesco's Exit the King was also performed at the Barrymore in 2009. The 2010 play Elling had nine performances before it flopped. This was followed in 2011 by the play Arcadia, as well as a special appearance, An Evening with Patti LuPone and Mandy Patinkin. The Barrymore hosted Death of a Salesman and Chaplin in 2012; Macbeth and Betrayal in 2013; and A Raisin in the Sun in 2014. With the exception of the musical Chaplin, these productions were all revivals of plays. Next, the play The Curious Incident of the Dog in the Night-Time opened in late 2014 and ran for nearly two years. When The Curious Incident closed, the food show presenter Alton Brown had a limited appearance at the Barrymore in November 2016.

In 2017, the Barrymore hosted the plays The Present and Six Degrees of Separation. At the end of the same year, the Barrymore staged the musical The Band's Visit, which ran through early 2019. The play The Inheritance opened in November 2019 and was a few days short of its scheduled closing when the Barrymore temporarily closed on March 12, 2020, due to the COVID-19 pandemic. The theater reopened on September 4, 2021, with a limited revival of Waitress, which closed at the end of the year. The musical Paradise Square ran for three months from April to July 2022, followed by the first Broadway revival of the play The Piano Lesson, which opened at the theater in October 2022 and ran for three months. A transfer of the West End play Peter Pan Goes Wrong opened at the Barrymore in April 2023, running for three months. This was followed in August 2023 by a limited run of Antonio Díaz's magic show El Mago Pop, then in October 2023 by Barry Manilow and Bruce Sussman's musical Harmony. The play Patriots opened at the Barrymore in April 2024 and was followed in October by a limited run of Our Town. A revival of Othello then opened at the Barrymore in March 2025, running for three months. It was followed by a revival of Joe Turner's Come and Gone, which opened in April 2026 and ran through July. The play Here There Are Blueberries opened at the Barrymore in November 2026 and is scheduled to be followed by Small Mouth Sounds in March 2027.

== Notable productions ==
Productions are listed by the year of their first performance.

=== 1920s to 1990s ===
Notable productions at the theater
Opening year	Name	Refs.
1929	Death Takes a Holiday	
1930	Topaze	
1930	The Truth Game	
1930	Scarlet Sister Mary	
1931	Mélo	
1931	The School for Scandal	
1932	There's Always Juliet	
1932	Gay Divorce	
1933	Design for Living	
1934	Both Your Houses	
1934	Ruth Draper	
1935	Point Valaine	
1935	Othello	
1935	Macbeth	
1936	Bury the Dead	
1936	Night Must Fall	
1936	The Women	
1938	Knickerbocker Holiday	
1939	No Time for Comedy	
1939	Key Largo	
1940	Pal Joey	
1941	Best Foot Forward	
1942	R.U.R.	
1943	Three Sisters	
1945	Rebecca	
1945	The Barretts of Wimpole Street	
1945	Marinka	
1945	Pygmalion	
1946	The Duchess of Malfi	
1946	Cyrano de Bergerac	
1947	The Telephone/The Medium	(Note: The Telephone and The Medium were performed together.)
1947	A Streetcar Named Desire	
1949	The Rat Race	
1950	The Consul	
1950	Bell, Book and Candle	
1951	The Fourposter	
1952	I've Got Sixpence	
1953	Misalliance	
1953	Tea and Sympathy	
1955	The Desperate Hours	
1955	Marcel Marceau	
1955	The Chalk Garden	
1957	Small War on Murray Hill	
1957	Waiting for Godot	
1957	Look Homeward, Angel	
1959	A Raisin in the Sun	
1959	A Majority of One	
1960	The Hostage	
1960	Critic's Choice	
1961	The Complaisant Lover	
1962	Moby-Dick	
1964	The Passion of Josef D.	
1965	The Amen Corner	
1966	Wait Until Dark	
1966	We Have Always Lived in the Castle	
1966	Les Ballets Africains	
1967	Black Comedy/White Lies	(Note: Black Comedy and White Lies were performed together.)
1967	The Little Foxes	
1968	Don't Drink the Water	
1968	The Seven Descents of Myrtle	
1968	Happiness Is Just a Little Thing Called a Rolls Royce	
1968	The Goodbye People	
1969	The Front Page	
1970	Conduct Unbecoming	
1971	The Philanthropist	
1971	Ain't Supposed to Die a Natural Death	
1972	Captain Brassbound's Conversion	
1972	Don't Play Us Cheap	
1973	The Visit	
1973	Holiday	
1974	A Song at Twilight/Come Into the Garden, Maud	(Note: A Song at Twilight and Come Into the Garden, Maud were performed together and were billed as Noël Coward in Two Keys.)
1975	The Night That Made America Famous	
1975	Travesties	
1976	Legend	
1976	Poor Murderer	
1977	American Buffalo	
1977	I Love My Wife	
1979	Romantic Comedy	
1981	The West Side Waltz	
1982	Is There Life After High School?	
1982	Foxfire	
1983	Baby	
1984	Hurlyburly	
1986	Social Security	
1988	Joe Turner's Come and Gone	
1988	The Secret Rapture	
1989	Rumors	
1990	Lettice and Lovage	
1991	Mule Bone	
1992	A Streetcar Named Desire	
1993	The Sisters Rosensweig	
1995	Indiscretions	
1996	An Ideal Husband	
1997	The Life	
1998	Electra	
1999	Amy's View	
1999	Putting It Together	

=== 2000s to present ===
Notable productions at the theater
Opening year	Name	Refs.
2000	The Real Thing	
2000	The Tale of the Allergist's Wife	
2002	Imaginary Friends	
2003	Salome	
2004	Sly Fox	
2005	The Glass Menagerie	
2006	Ring of Fire	
2006	Company	
2007	Red Carpet Massacre	
2008	November	
2008	Speed-the-Plow	
2009	Exit the King	
2009	Race	
2010	Elling	
2011	Arcadia	
2011	An Evening with Patti LuPone and Mandy Patinkin	
2012	Death of a Salesman	
2012	Chaplin	
2013	Macbeth	
2013	Betrayal	
2014	A Raisin in the Sun	
2014	The Curious Incident of the Dog in the Night-Time	
2016	Alton Brown Live: Eat Your Science	
2016	The Present	
2017	Six Degrees of Separation	
2017	The Band's Visit	
2019	The Inheritance	
2021	Waitress	
2022	Paradise Square	
2022	The Piano Lesson	
2023	Peter Pan Goes Wrong	
2023	El Mago Pop	
2023	Harmony: A New Musical	
2024	Patriots	
2024	Our Town	
2025	Othello	
2026	Joe Turner's Come and Gone	
2026	Here There Are Blueberries	
2027	Small Mouth Sounds	

== Box office record ==
Waitress achieved the box office record for the Ethel Barrymore Theatre. It grossed $197,878 in ticket sales on September 3, 2021, breaking the previous single-performance house record at the Ethel Barrymore Theatre set by the production of Betrayal ($184,476). This record was broken in August 2023 by El Mago Pop which grossed $2.717 million in one week of ticket sales. In March 2025, Othello garnered $2,818,297 in ticket sales over eight performances, breaking the all-time box office record for any Broadway theater; this was in part due to high average ticket prices.

== See also ==
- List of New York City Designated Landmarks in Manhattan from 14th to 59th Streets
- List of Broadway theaters
