= Teatre Victòria =

Theatre in Barcelona, Spain

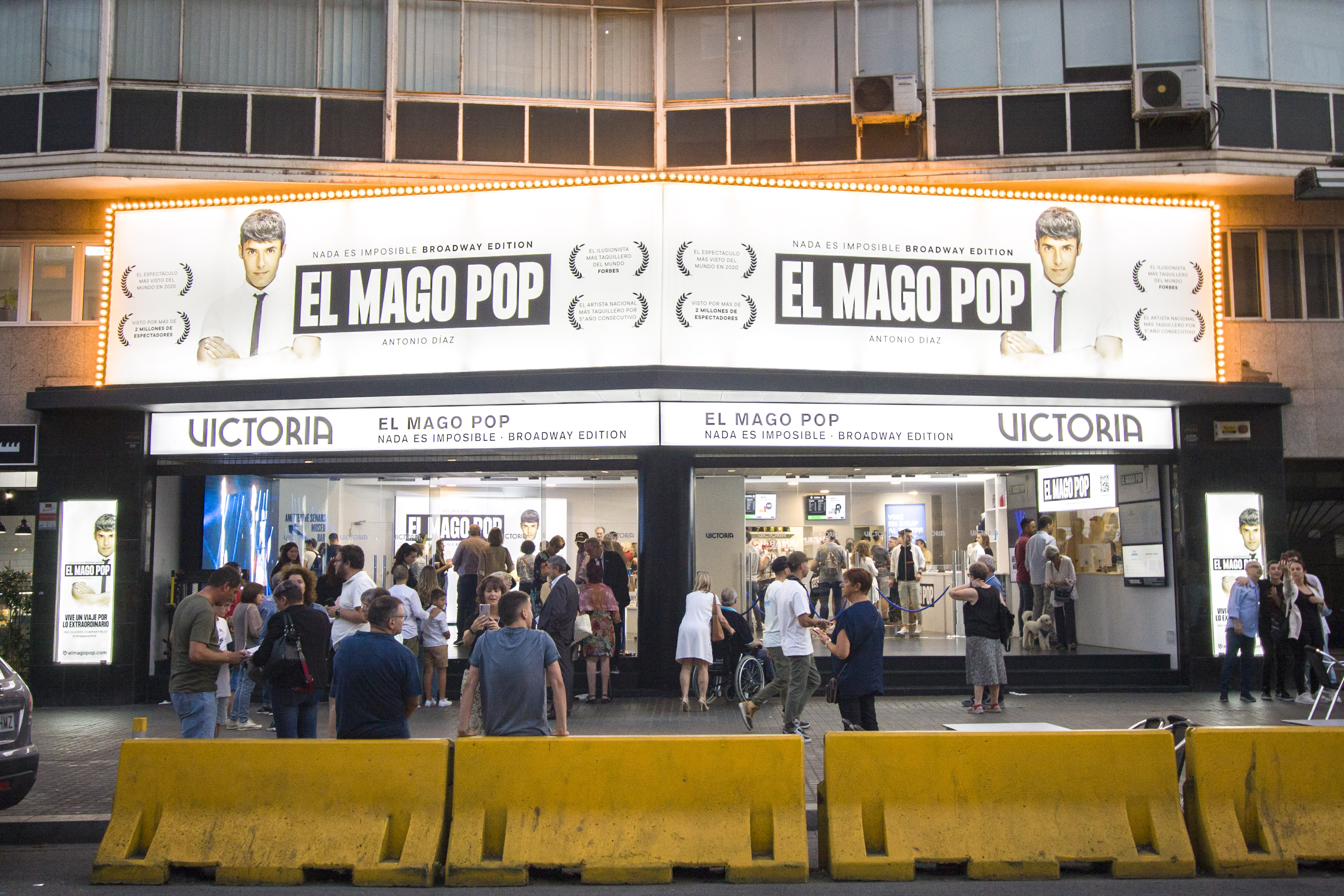
- Teatre Victòria in September 2022
- Interactive map of Teatre Victòria
- Former names: Pabello Soriano theatre
- Address: 67 Av. del Paral·lel, Sants-Montjuïc; Barcelona; Spain
- Coordinates: 41.3747756°N 2.1687885°E
- Owner: El Mago Pop
- Designation: Theatre

Construction
- Opened: 22 April 1905
- Renovated: 1992
- Expanded: 1967
- Years active: 22 April 1905 – present
- Architect: Andreu Audet i Puig

Website
- teatrevictoria.com

The Teatre Victòria ("Victoria Theatre") is a theatre in Barcelona, Catalonia, Spain.

The theatre was designed by Andreu Audet i Puig and was inaugurated on 22 April 1905 as the "Pabellòn Sorianno theatre".

In 1980, Jaime Balaguer retired and his sons, Jordi and Ricardo Balaguer took over the theatre. In 1986, with a 20-year rental agreement, the company Tres per Tres was founded, formed by Tricicle, Dagoll Dagom and Anexa. On 22 January 2002, Tres per Tres purchased the theatre. In June 2019, it was purchased by the illusionist El Mago Pop.

== History ==
=== Origins ===
The pavilion was demolished and rebuilt several times from 1900 to 1905 as part of an improvement process.

=== 1916–1954 ===
La canción del olvido by Serrano and L’auca del senyor Esteve were presented at the theatre on 12 May 1917.

=== Balaguer era ===
On 8 March 1984, 1.000 años de jazz was released. Its premiere was attended by the President of the Generalitat Jordi Pujol and was received positively by critics. In two articles from La Vanguardia, published on 14 September 1984 and 12 February 1985, the authors reflected on the lack of aid from the City Council and Generalitat for the theatre. It was struggling to be able to present quality shows.

On 22 January 2002, Tres per Tres purchased the theatre and the Balaguer era ended.

=== 21st century ===
In 2016, the musical Scaramouche premiered at the theatre. In 2019, the Catalan production of Spring Awakening (El despertar de la primavera) in Catalan was praised by Anna Rosa Cisquella.

In June 2019, the theatre was purchased by Antonio Díaz, an illusionist who goes by the alias "El Mago Pop" from Tres per Tres, who managed the theatre from 1986.

During the COVID-19 pandemic, the Teatre Victòria lost viewers. However El Mago Pop's show Nada es imposible (English: "Nothing is impossible"), airing in 2020, became the most watched show in the world during the pandemic.

On 16 February 2026, the team behind the Catalan-language comedy sketch show Polonia hosted its 20th anniversary gala at the Teatre Victòria, with special guest cameos including Spanish Prime Minister Pedro Sanchez and former Catalan President Artur Mas, in which the event was then recorded and later broadcast on Thursday 19 February on the Catalan tv channel TV3.
