= Pepe Rubianes =

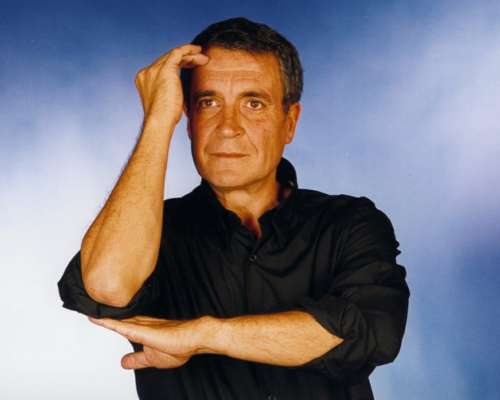
- Born: José Rubianes Alegret; 2 September 1947; Vilagarcía de Arousa, Galicia, Spain
- Died: 1 March 2009 (age 61); Barcelona, Spain
- Occupation(s): Actor, Director, Comedian
- Years active: 1983 - 2009

José Rubianes Alegret, better known as Pepe Rubianes (2 September 1947 – 1 March 2009) was a Galician actor and theater director, born in Galicia and brought up in Catalonia, specializing in mime, imitation and monologues. He was known for his irony, his sharp sense of humor and verbal torrents sprinkled with swear words, and rigorously dressing in black clothes when acting in dramatic scenes. He defined himself as a "Galician-Catalan actor: Galician because I was born in Galicia although I hardly ever lived there, and Catalan because I have always lived in Catalonia although I was never born here."

== Biography ==
=== Early life ===
Rubianes was born in Vilagarcia de Arousa (Pontevedra) in 1947. He soon arrived in Catalonia where he studied, trained and developed his total acting career. He used to act both in Castilian and in Catalan, but most often performed in both languages at once, alternating unexpectedly, introducing odd sentences in Galician.

=== His childhood ===
From a very early age Rubianes demonstrated his penchant for acting. At just 16 years of age he had his debut in a work of the National Organization for the Blind (ONCE). But it was at the University of Barcelona, where he studied law, that he became familiar with the stage. He first joined the T.U.C. group (University Theatre of Cámara). Then he joined the NGTU (New University Theater Group), led by Frederic Roda, where he met members of the future Dagoll Dagom company, with whom he would collaborate on several occasions throughout his career.

=== Theater in Barcelona ===
In 1970, while still at university, he showed himself to be an actor of imagination performing in An Enemy of the People, by Henrik Ibsen, which was premiered at the Teatro Calderón de Barcelona. Subsequently, he participated in El café de la Marina by Josep Maria de Segarra, which premiered in El Port de la Selva. He also had a role in José Ruibal's The pious monkey.

== Leap to professional theater ==
In 1977, he performed in No hablaré en clase, the third play of Dagoll Dagom, as a member of the company. The success of the work made him consider, along with the other members of Dagoll, the possibility of a starting professional theatre company. He took this decision in 1978, participating in Dagoll Dagom's fourth work, Antaviana, a musical which saw great success with both audiences and critics. Rubianes toured Spain with the group, and also performed with them in France, Italy and Switzerland.

In 1981 Rubianes was part of the cast of Operación Ubú by Els Joglars, performed at the Teatre Lliure and another success.

== Rubianes, alone ==
In 1981 Rubianes decided to launch a solo career. He premiered his show Pay-Pay, which was performed for three years at several venues in Barcelona and other Spanish cities, and that led him to act alone in Central America: Cuba, Mexico, Panama, Costa Rica, Nicaragua and Guatemala.

In 1984 he premiered his second play, Ño, performed in several cities in Spain, Argentina and Uruguay. Sin palabras premiered in 1987 and En resumidas cuentas in 1988, an anthology of the best numbers of his first three shows.

Rubianes ended the 1980s with a great prestige, which expanded dramatically in the next decade, as he has great success with works like Ssscum!, which is placed among the most renowned monologues in Spain.

Moreover, in the 1990s new media such as radio, film and television were introduced which awarded him great social popularity. This section highlights his involvement as a protagonist of the series for television Makinavaja, an adaptation of a popular comic strip of cartoonist the Ivá. The work was well known for lasting so long in Spain. In 1995 Rubianes: 15 años was released in Barcelona, bringing together the best of his solo performances since 1980. In 1999 participated in an interview for Malalts de Tele, TV3 which, at eight and ahalf hours, achieved the Guinness record for the longest interview on television. From 1997 to 2006 he performed his most highly acclaimed show called Rubianes, solamente, from which released a CD of monologues in 1998 and a DVD edition in 2001.

In 2006 he directed the performance of Lorca eran todos and, in January 2008, La sonrisa etíope.

In April 2008 he was diagnosed with lung cancer which kept him off the stage and finally caused his death on the morning of 1 March 2009.

== Controversy ==
In 2006, he was the subject of intense controversy over his speech on 20 January 2006 on the El Club program on TV3 (Catalan public television). Responding to a question from the presenter Albert Om about his attitude to the unity of Spain, he replied "To me, I don't give a flying fuck about the unity of Spain, they can give it to Spain in its damn ass and explode in there, and leave its balls hanging from a bell tower." Later, before the uproar caused by these statements, he publicly apologized and explained that such comments were referring to a certain concept of Spain:

...I insulted the Spain that killed Lorca. I respect the Spain that is constitutional and democratic. This Spain merits all my respect, and also, I belong to her...

Also, his book Me Voy (I'm Going) states that this statement was made in a comic tone, an adaptation of part of the script of his show, Rubianes, solamente (Rubianes, himself)

The Association for the Defense of the Spanish Nation prosecuted Rubianes for "insulting Spain", which was filed in May 2007. However, in June 2008, the Magistrate's Court in Sant Feliu de Llobregat decided to reopen the case and accusing Pepe Rubianes and the presenter Albert Om of "incitement to hatred against a section of the population based on national origin and outrages upon Spain," and also against TV3 as responsible vicariously.

Rubianes company was hired by Mario Gas, the director of the municipally owned Teatro Español, to present in Madrid his piece, Lorca Was Everybody, about the poet and playwright Federico García Lorca, part of a cycle of homage to the Grenadine poet during September 2006. After the protests (and even threats, as told by Alicia Moreno, councillor of the Arts) against presentation in a municipal theater, the actor decided to withdraw voluntarily from his show because of, in his words, the "aggressive atmosphere" and "in order to free the management from the pressure to which they have been subjected". Mario Gas considered resigning in the circumstances.

An independent Madrid spokesman explained: "It is unacceptable and intolerable that the actor seeks to take advantage of contracts in public spaces at the expense of everyone." That, he said, "is unacceptable for a person who is dedicated to insulting Spain and Spaniards."

The actor noted that, thus far, the presentation of the work in different Spanish cities had not created any problem, and again attributed the situation in Madrid to a campaign of "the most rancid right." Rubianes, accepted the offer of CC.OO. to present Lorca Was Everybody in its auditorium in Madrid.

== Shows ==
=== Own Shows ===
- 1983 Pay-Pay
- 1984 Ño
- 1987 Sin palabras
- 1988 En resumidas cuentas
- 1991 Por el amor de Dios
- 1992 Ssscum!
- 1995 Rubianes: 15 años
- 1997 Rubianes, solamente
- 2006 Lorca eran todos
- 2008 La sonrisa etíope

=== Participation in other shows ===
- 1977 No hablaré en clase, by Dagoll Dagom.
- 1978 Antaviana by Dagoll Dagom.
- 1981 Operación Ubú by Els Joglars.
- 1996 El crimen del cine Oriente (film directed by Pedro Costa).

== Awards and honors ==
- 1987. Premio Joanot i Racó de l'Arnau al Mejor Actor del Año.
- 1991. Premio Turia.
- 1996. Premio "Els Millors" al Mejor Actor por Rubianes 15 años.
- 1998. Premio "Les mil i una".
- 1998. Premio Especial de la Crítica por sus 15 años.
- 1999. Premio San Miguel del Patronato de la Fira de Teatre al Carrer de Tárrega en la Categoría de "Mejor Obra Representada en una sala" por Rubianes, solamente.
- 1999. Premio de Honor FAD Sebastià Gasch.
- 1999. Premio "Els Millors" al Mejor Espectáculo Teatral Rubianes, solamente.
- 2006. Premio Gat Perich por su trayectoria.
