= Tessa Calders =

Catalan archaeologist, philologist (born 1950)

Tessa Calders i Artís
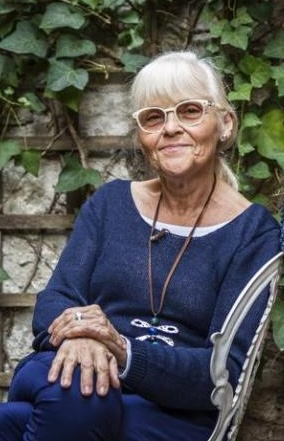
- Calders in Barcelona
- Born: 27 December 1950 (age 75); Mexico City
- Education: University of Barcelona
- Occupations: Archaeologist, philologist, expert in Hebrew culture
- Father: Pere Calders i Rossinyol

Tessa Calders i Artís (born 27 December 1950) is a Catalan archaeologist, philologist and expert in Hebrew culture. She was a professor and head of the Semitic Languages department at the University of Barcelona, and founder of the Institute of Jewish World Studies.

== Biography ==
She was the third child born in Mexico City to Rosa Artís i Gener, the second wife of Catalan writer and cartoonist, Pere Calders i Rossinyol, who left Spain and went into exile after the fascist victory in the Spanish Civil War. They lived in Mexico for 23 years. Tessa came from a family of writers, and her uncle was the Catalan writer Avel·lí Artís-Gener (widely known by the pseudonym Tisner) who also lived in Mexican exile with Tessa's family. After the fall of Spain's fascist dictator, Francisco Franco, the exiled family returned home to Spain.

In September 1973, Tessa graduated in Near Eastern Archaeology from the University of Barcelona, located in the Catalonia region of northern Spain. An ardent promoter of the Catalan language, she rebelled against the custom at that time of writing one's undergraduate thesis in Spanish (the official language of the University of Barcelona). Knowing there would be disapproval by the University's faculty, including her thesis supervisors, she wrote her thesis in Catalan and published it and bound it before it was presented to the defense committee, which put the committee at a disadvantage. Because the document was already completed, the committee contented itself with attacking other aspects of the work and not the language in which it was written. Still, she passed the examination, received her baccalaureate and went on to earn her doctorate in Hebrew culture, eventually becoming a full professor and director of the Department of Semitic Philology at the University of Barcelona.

She also founded the Institute of Jewish World Studies in Barcelona and served as its president. As of June 2025, she is the secretary of the Institute.

== Selected works ==
- 2002: The Prince and the Monk. ISBN 8486329213
- 2023: Arendt's hidden Jewishness. ISBN 2958484963
- Artís, Tessa Calders i and Esperança Valls i Pujol. “L’Institut d’Estudis Món Juïc.” (2016).
