= Dagoll Dagom =

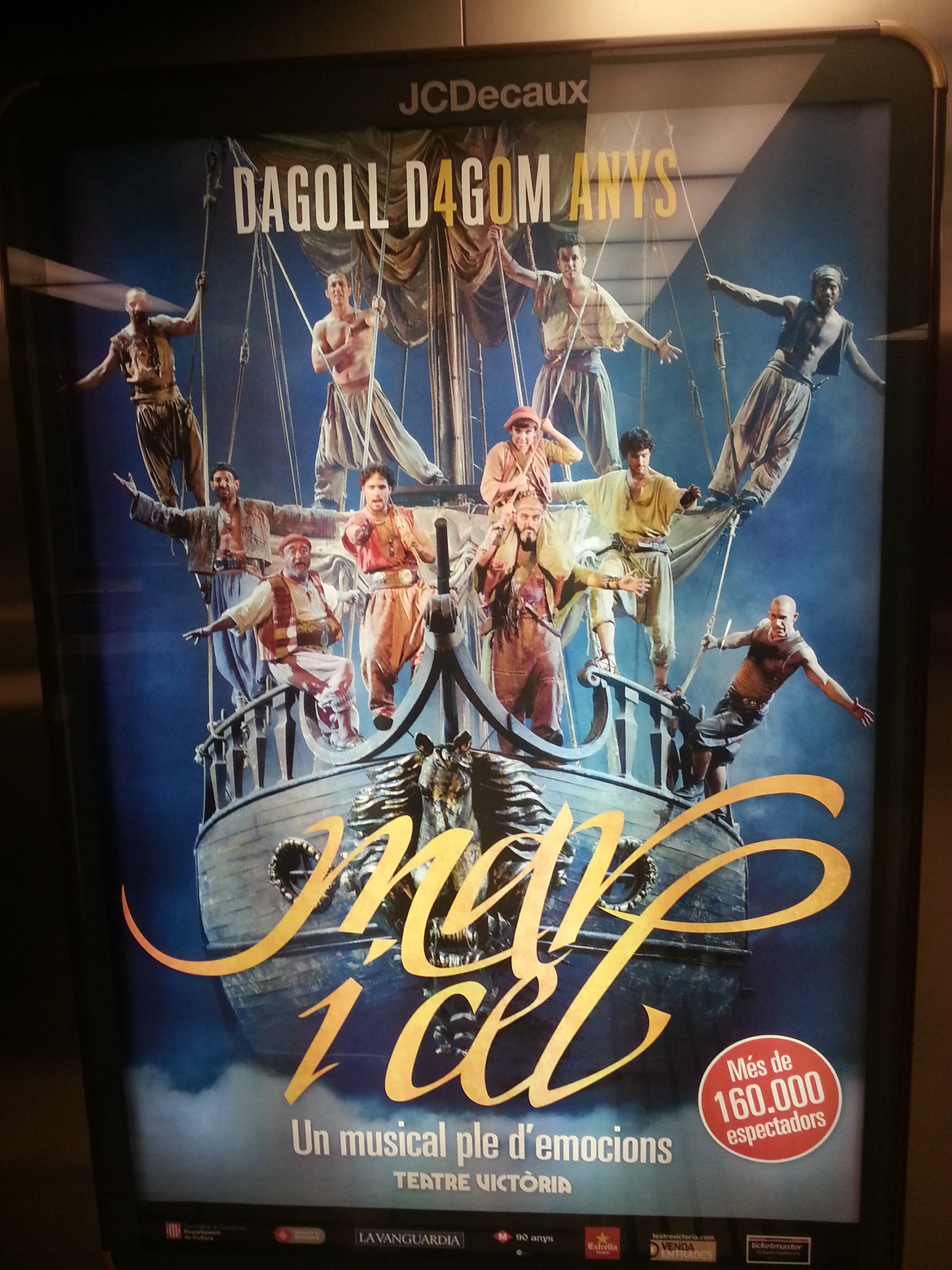
Mar i Cel

Dagoll Dagom is a Catalan theatre company founded in 1974, mostly dedicated to musical theater. They have performed around 5,000 times in Europe and South America. Dagoll Dagom have also created television series and released soundtrack albums.

The company was directed by Joan Lluís Bozzo, Anna Rosa Cisquella and Miquel Periel.

In 2015 they received the Joan Coromines Prize. In 2025 Cisquella announced the dissolution of the company, after 50 years of work on and off stage.

== Works ==
=== Theatre ===
- Yo era un tonto y lo que he visto me ha hecho dos tontos (1974)
- Nocturn per acordió (1975)
- No hablaré en clase (1977)
- Antaviana (1978), based on Pere Calders 's tales
- Nit de Sant Joan (1981), with music by Jaume Sisa
- Glups! (1983), based on Gerard Lauzier's comics
- Antaviana (1985), revival
- El Mikado (1986), (The Mikado), by Gilbert and Sullivan
- Quarteto da cinque (1987)
- Mar i Cel (1988), based on the homonymous work by Àngel Guimerà.
- Flor de nit (1992), written by Manuel Vázquez-Montalbán
- Historietes (1993), a revival of the previous plays
- T'odio amor meu (1995), based on Dorothy Parker's stories and with Cole Porter's songs.
- Pigmalió (1997), (Pygmalion), by George Bernard Shaw
- Els Pirates (1997), (The Pirates of Penzance), by Gilbert and Sullivan
- Cacao (2000)
- Poe (2002), based on Edgar Allan Poe's tales.
- La Perritxola (2003), (La Périchole), by Jaques Offenbach
- Mar i Cel (2004), revival
- El Mikado (2005), revival
- Boscos endins (2007-2008), (Into the Woods), by Stephen Sondheim.
- Aloma (2008-2009), based on the homonymous work by Catalan writer Mercè Rodoreda.
- Nit de Sant Joan (2010-2011), revival
- Cop de Rock (2011), which includes some of the best-known Rock català songs.
- La família irreal (2012-2013), a parody of the spanish monarchy
- Super 3, el musical (2013), based on the homonymous children’s tv program
- Mar i Cel (2014-2015), revival
- Scaramouche (2016-2017), based on the homonymous movie
- Maremar (2018)
- L'Alegria que Passa (2023-2024)
- Mar i Cel (2024), closing show of the company

=== Television ===
- Oh! Europa (1993)
- Oh! Espanya (1996)
- Psico-Express (2001)
- La memòria dels cargols (2005-2006)
- La Sagrada Família (2010)
