= Casas (surname) =

Casas is a Spanish surname. Notable people with the surname include:

== Acting ==
- Antonio Casas (1911–1982), Spanish actor
- Mario Casas (born 1986), Spanish actor
- Óscar Casas (born 1998), Spanish actor

== Art ==
- David Zamora Casas, Mexican-American visual artist, performance artist, and community activist
- Juan Francisco Casas (born 1976), Spanish artist and poet
- Mel Casas (1929–2014), American-born artist, activist, writer and teacher
- Ramon Casas i Carbó (1866–1932), Spanish artist

== Law ==
- Fernando Vizcaíno Casas (1926–2003), Spanish labour lawyer, journalist, and writer
- María Emilia Casas (born 1950), Spanish jurist
- Mariana Casas (born 1959), Argentine lawyer

== Politics ==
- David Casas (born 1971), American politician in Georgia
- Roberto Casas (born 1931), Cuban-born American politician in Florida
- Sergio Casas (born 1971), Argentine politician

== Sports ==
=== Cycling ===
- Ana Teresa Casas (born 1991), Mexican racing cyclist
- Claudio José Casas (born 1982), Spanish road racing cyclist
- Félix García Casas (born 1968), Spanish road cyclist
- Helena Casas (born 1988), Spanish track cyclist from Catalonia
- Iván Casas (born 1980), Colombian racing cyclist
- José Casas (cyclist) (born 1945), Spanish racing cyclist
- Julia Casas (born 1980), Spanish racing cyclist
- Miguel Casas (1920–2003), Spanish cyclist

=== Football (soccer) ===
- Aitor Casas (born 1992), Spanish footballer
- Atzimba Casas (born 1994), American-born Mexican footballer
- Bryan Casas (born 2004), Mexican footballer
- Diego Casas (born 1995), Uruguayan footballer
- Gastón Casas (born 1978), Argentine footballer and manager
- Ismael Casas (born 2001), Spanish footballer
- Javier Casas (footballer, born 1982), Spanish footballer
- Jesús Casas (born 1973), Spanish football manager
- Javier Casas (soccer, born 2003), American soccer player
- Louie Casas (born 1986), Filipino footballer
- Marcelo Casas (born 1992), Paraguayan-Spanish footballer
- Tomás Casas (born 1996), Argentine footballer
- Yancarlo Casas (born 1981), Peruvian footballer

=== Wrestling ===
- Casas wrestling family, a Mexican family of luchadors, or professional wrestlers
  - Canelo Casas (born 1982), Mexican wrestler
  - Danny Casas (born 1986), Mexican wrestler
  - Negro Casas (born 1960), Mexican wrestler

=== Other ===
- Ana María Casas (born 1995), Mexican gymnast
- André Casas (1934–2021), French rugby player
- Iker Casas (born 1999), Mexican taekwondo practitioner
- Ivo Casas (born 1992), Portuguese volleyball player
- Jordi Casas (born 1976), Spanish field hockey player
- Mireia Casas (born 1969), Spanish windsurfer
- Queralt Casas (born 1992), Spanish basketball player
- Ricard Casas (born 1962), Spanish basketball coach
- Shaine Casas (born 1999), American swimmer
- Triston Casas (born 2000), American baseball player
- Víctoria Casas, Mexican swimmer

== Other ==
- Antoni Vila Casas (born 1930), Spanish pharmaceutical executive
- Arthur Casas, Brazilian architect
- Borita Casas (1911–1999), Spanish journalist, playwright and author
- Carlos Casas (born 1974), Spanish filmmaker
- Creu Casas (1913–2007), Spanish botanist from Catalonia
- Estela Casas (born 1961), American health advocate and news anchor
- Flora Osete Casas (1883–?), Spanish lexicographer, translator, and writer
- Germán Casas (born 1939), Chilean singer
- Myrna Casas (1934–2022), Puerto Rican playwright and director
- Penelope Casas (1943–2013), American food writer
- Rosalba Casas (born 1950), Mexican-born professor of history and socio-politics in Canada

== See also ==
- Louis-François Cassas (1756–1827), French artist, architect, and archeologist
- Casas (disambiguation)
