= Casas =

Casas may refer to:

== People ==
- Casas (surname)

== Places ==
=== Argentina ===
- Casas, locality in Santa Fe Province

=== Mexico ===
- Casas Municipality, Tamaulipas
- Casas Grandes, prehistoric archaeological site in Chihuahua
- Casas Grandes, Chihuahua
- Casas Grandes Municipality
- Nuevo Casas Grandes, Chihuahua
- Nuevo Casas Grandes Municipality

=== Spain ===
==== Andalusia ====
- Benalup-Casas Viejas, municipality in the province of Cádiz
- Casas Bajas, locality in the Province of Granada

==== Castilla-La Mancha ====
- Casas de Juan Núñez, municipality in the province of Albacete
- Casas de Lázaro, municipality in the province of Albacete
- Casas de Ves, municipality in the province of Albacete
- Casas-Ibáñez, municipality in the province of Albacete
- Casas de Benítez, municipality in the province of Cuenca
- Casas de Fernando Alonso, municipality in the province of Cuenca
- Casas de Garcimolina, municipality in the province of Cuenca
- Casas de Guijarro, municipality in the province of Cuenca
- Casas de Haro, municipality in the province of Cuenca
- Casas de los Pinos, municipality in the province of Cuenca

==== Extremadura ====
- Casas de Don Antonio, municipality in the province of Cáceres
- Casas de Don Gómez, municipality in the province of Cáceres
- Casas de Millán, municipality in the province of Cáceres
- Casas de Miravete, municipality in the province of Cáceres
- Casas del Castañar, municipality in the province of Cáceres
- Casas del Monte, municipality in the province of Cáceres
- Casas de Belvís, locality and former municipality in the Province of Cáceres
- Casas de Don Pedro, municipality in the province of Badajoz
- Casas de Reina, municipality in the province of Badajoz

=== United States ===
- Casas, Texas, a census-designated place in Starr County
- Casas Adobes, New Mexico, an unincorporated community and census-designated place in Grant County

== Other ==
- Casas, a synonym for the moth genus Coleophora
- Casas Bahia, a Brazilian retail chain specializing in furniture and home appliances
- Casas GEO, a defunct Mexican housing development company

== See also ==
- Las Casas (disambiguation)
