= Las Casas (disambiguation) =

Las Casas commonly referred to as Bartolomé de las Casas (1484–1566), Spanish historian, social reformer and Dominican friar.

Las Casas may also refer to:

== Places ==
Chile

- Padre Las Casas, Chile, a city and commune located in Cautín Province

Dominican Republic

- Padre Las Casas, Dominican Republic, a municipality of the Azua province

Philippines

- Las Casas Filipinas de Acuzar, a beach resort and heritage destination in Bagac, Bataan

Puerto Rico

- Las Casas (Santurce), a sector of Santurce, San Juan
  - Camp Las Casas, a military installation established in Santurce in 1904
  - Residencial Las Casas, a public housing project in San Juan

Spain

- Las Casas del Conde, a village and municipality in the province of Salamanca

United States

- Las Casas or Lascassas, Tennessee, an unincorporated community in Rutherford County
- Las Casas Occupational High School, a high school in Chicago, Illinois

== See also ==
- Casas (disambiguation)
- De las Casas (surname)
