= HKA =

HKA may refer to:

- HKA test, of molecular evolution
- Blytheville Municipal Airport, in Arkansas, US
- Henryka Beyer (1782–1855), German painter
- Hong Kong Academy
- Hong Kong Attitude, an esports organization
- Hong Kong Airlines, founded 2006
- Hong Kong Airways, active 1947–1959
- Kahe language
- Superior Aviation, an American airline
