= List of members of the Institut d'Estudis Catalans =

List of members of the Institut d'Estudis Catalans (IEC) since its conception in 1907 until May 2016.

== Members of IEC ==
=== Permanent and emeritus ===
Name	Date
Ramon d'Abadal i de Vinyals	1942-05-01
Montserrat Aguadé i Porres	2013-03-18
Joaquim Agulló i Batlle	1992-10-23
Joan Ainaud i de Lasarte	1958-04-11
Antoni M. Alcover i Sureda	1911-02-14
Salvador Alegret i Sanromà	1990-09-17
Ramon d'Alòs-Moner i de Dou	1918-12-12
Josep Alsina i Bofill	1961-03-17
Josep Amat i Girbau	1990-09-17
Gabriel Amengual Coll	2006-02-28
M. Àngels Anglada i d'Abadal	1991-05-21
Higini Anglès i Pàmies	1942-05-11
Ramon Aramon i Serra	1942-05-01
Ferran Arasa i Gil	2016-01-18
Manuel Ardit i Lucas	1992-12-18
Joan A. Argenter i Giralt	1989-11-03
Enric Argullol i Murgadas	1991-02-01
Joaquim Arnau Querol	2008-06-16
Francesc Asensi i Botet	1998-06-15
Antoni M. Badia i Margarit	1968-11-15
Ignasi J. Baiges i Jardí	2016-01-18
Albert Balcells i González	1986-11-21
Damià Barceló i Cullerés	1998-06-15
Bartomeu Barceló i Pons	1991-02-01
Xavier Barral i Altet	1992-12-18
Heribert Barrera i Costa	1978-03-17
Ramon Bartrons i Bach	2010-12-13
Carles Bas i Peired	1978-04-14
Joan Bastardas i Parera	1972-05-19
Josep Ramon Bataller i Calatayud	1942-05-01
Pilar Bayer i Isant	2001-06-18
Joan Becat i Rajaut	1991-11-15
Ernest Belenguer i Cebrià	2014-03-17
Xavier Bellés i Ros	1992-10-23
Vicenç Beltran i Pepió	2010-12-13
Jaume Bertranpetit i Busquets	1994-06-06
Josep Lluís Blasco i Estellés	1999-06-14
Jaume Bofill i Mates	1918-02-05
Josep M. Bofill i Pichot	1911-02-14
Pere Bohigas i Balaguer	1942-06-13
Oriol de Bolòs i Capdevila	1964-01-24
Eduard Bonet i Guinó	1978-07-07
Xavier Bonfill i Cosp	2014-06-16
Pere Bosch Gimpera	1935-11-29
Dolors Bramon i Planas	2012-02-27
Josep M. Bricall i Masip	2006-02-28
Guillem M. de Brocà i de Montagut	1907-06-18
Joan-Ferran Cabestany i Fort	1999-06-14
M. Teresa Cabré i Castellví	1989-11-03
Jaume Cabré i Fabré	2000-06-19
Anna Cabré i Pla	2010-03-29
Oriol Camps i Giralt	2016-01-18
Miquel Canals i Artigas	2011-06-27
Jordi Carbonell	1972-05-19
Salvador Cardús i Ros	2008-06-16
Josep Carner i Puig-Oriol	1911-02-14
Joaquim Carreras i Artau	1944-02-12
Josep Carreras i Barnés	1990-09-17
Josep M. de Casacuberta i Roger	1958-06-27
Joaquim Casal i Fàbrega	1989-11-03
Alícia Casals i Gelpí	2007-02-26
Jaume Casals i Pons	2011-06-27
Jordi Casanova i Roca	2014-06-16
Creu Casas i Sicart	1978-02-17
Enric Casassas i Simó	1972-05-19
Lluís Casassas i Simó	1990-01-29
Oriol Casassas i Simó	1985-01-11
Jordi Casassas i Ymbert	2012-02-27
Josep M. Casasús i Guri	1990-05-07
Jordi Castellanos Vila	2003-04-07
Manuel Castellet i Solanas	1978-03-17
Josep Castells i Guardiola	1978-04-14
Leandre Cervera i Astor	1946-02-23
Alexandre Cirici i Pellicer	1978-03-17
Frederic Clascar i Sanou	1911-02-14
Bonaventura Clotet Sala	2015-06-22
Miquel Coll i Alentorn	1961-03-17
Antoni Joan Colom Cañellas	2004-06-14
Eusebi Colomer i Pous	1968-11-15
Germà Colón Domènech	1993-06-07
Antoni Comas i Pujol	1978-02-17
Jacint Corbella i Corbella	1999-12-20
Jordi Corominas i Dulcet	2000-06-19
Maria Corominas i Piulats	2008-06-16
Pere Coromines i Montanya	1907-06-18
Joan Coromines i Vigneaux	1950-05-21
Jordi Cots i Moner	1987-02-13
Josepa Cucó i Giner	2011-06-27
Maria Josep Cuenca Ordinyana	2005-06-13
Núria de Dalmases i Balañà	1996-06-17
Nicolau Dols i Salas	2014-05-19
Josep M. Domènech i Mateu	1985-01-11
Josep Domingo Ferrer	2016-01-18
Pere Domingo i Sanjuán	1966-03-29
Martí Domínguez Romero	2015-06-22
Eulàlia Duran i Grau	1990-05-07
Agustí Duran i Sanpere	1942-05-01
Mercè Durfort i Coll	1989-11-03
Joan Egea i Fernández	2012-02-27
Josep Egozcue i Cuixart	1992-10-23
Romà Escalas i Llimona	2002-06-17
Manuel Esteller Badosa	2015-06-22
Antoni Esteve i Subirana	1952-03-08
M. Teresa Estrach i Panella	2014-06-16
Gregori Estrada i Gamissans	1992-12-18
Marta Estrada i Miyares	2003-04-07
Joan Estruch i Gibert	1995-12-20
Pompeu Fabra i Poch	1911-02-14
Lluís Faraudo i de Saint-Germain	1953-02-14
Miquel A. Fargas i Roca	1911-02-14
Ramon Faus i Esteve	1968-11-29
Gaspar Feliu i Montfort	2007-02-26
Antoni Ferrando i Francès	1985-03-22
Gabriel Ferraté Pascual	1978-07-07
Lluís Ferrer i Caubet	2010-12-13
M. Teresa Ferrer i Mallol	1992-12-18
Lluís Figa i Faura	1987-02-13
Josep Vicenç Foix i Mas	1961-03-17
Lluís Folch i Camarasa	1990-05-07
Ramon Folch i Guillèn	1978-03-17
Joaquim Folch i Torres	1942-05-01
Manuel Font i Altaba	1986-01-10
Pius Font i Quer	1942-05-01
Josep M. Font i Rius	1970-06-26
Francesc Fontbona i de Vallescar	1992-12-18
Josep M. Fontboté i Mussoles	1980-11-29
Eduard Fontserè i Riba	1921-01-20
Màrius Foz i Sala	1985-01-11
Enric Freixa i Pedrals	1983-03-25
Octavi Fullat i Genís	1995-12-20
Antoni Josep Furió i Diego	2015-03-02
Joan Fuster i Ortells	1978-07-07
Alexandre Galí i Coll	1968-11-15
Jordi Galí i Garreta	2009-02-23
Lluís Garcia i Sevilla	1998-06-15
Maria Dolors Garcia Ramon	2006-02-28
Jesús Andrés García Sevilla	1994-06-06
Joaquim Garriga i Riera	2002-06-17
Carles A. Gasòliba i Böhm	1979-01-12
Josep Gifreu i Pinsach	1993-11-22
Salvador Giner de San Julián	1995-05-22
Emili Giralt i Raventós	1975-12-19
Joan Girbau i Badó	1990-09-17
Ramon Gomis de Barbarà	2013-02-25
Pilar González Duarte	2004-06-14
Francesc Gonzàlez i Sastre	1994-06-06
Josep González-Agàpito i Granell	1991-11-15
Joaquim Gosálbez i Noguera	1992-10-23
Carme Gràcia Beneyto	2001-12-17
Jordi Gras i Riera	1985-01-11
Albert Gras Martí	2006-02-28
Antoni Griera i Gaja	1921-01-20
Joan Grimalt i Obrador	2012-12-17
Ricard Guerrero i Moreno	1994-06-06
Jaume Guillamet Lloveras	2014-12-15
Àngel Guimerà i Jorge	1911-02-14
Enric Guinot i Rodríguez	2001-12-17
Joan Josep Guinovart i Cirera	2010-12-13
Josep Guitart i Duran	1990-05-07
Albert G. Hauf i Valls	1991-02-01
Josep Iglésies i Fort	1979-01-12
Albert Jané i Riera	2000-06-19
Ramon Jardí i Borràs	1926-10-17
Lluís Jofre i Roca	1996-06-17
Joan Jofre i Torroella	2008-02-25
Manuel Jorba i Jorba	2003-04-07
David Jou i Mirabent	1989-11-03
Lluís Jou i Mirabent	2016-02-15
Ramon Lapiedra i Civera	1986-06-27
Joan Ramon Laporte i Roselló	2014-06-16
Josep Laporte i Salas	1978-02-17
Àngel Llàcer i Escorihuela	2005-06-13
Josep Enric Llebot Rabagliati	2001-06-18
Jordi Lleonart i Aliberas	1994-06-06
Xavier Llimona i Pagès	1992-10-23
Josep M. Llompart i de la Peña	1985-06-14
Enric Lluch i Martín	1990-05-07
Pere Lluís Font	1990-05-07
Josep M. López i Picó	1933-07-10
Mercè Lorente i Casafont	2016-01-18
Joaquim Mallafrè i Gavaldà	1991-05-21
Joan Maluquer de Motes i Nicolau	1978-03-17
Joan Maragall i Gorina	1911-02-14
Ramon Margalef i López	1978-07-07
Isidor Marí i Mayans	1989-11-03
Abel Mariné i Font	2003-04-07
Joan Martí i Castell	1992-10-23
Josep Martines Peres	2005-06-13
Tomàs Martínez Romero	2003-04-07
Francesc Martorell i Trabal	1916-01-07
Joan Mas i Vives	2008-02-25
Andreu Mas-Colell	2005-06-13
Jaume Massó i Torrents	1907-06-18
Josep Massot i Muntaner	1999-06-14
Marc Mayer i Olivé	1996-06-17
Jaume Mensa i Valls	2016-02-15
Àngel Messeguer i Peypoch	2011-06-27
Concepció Mir i Curcó	1992-12-18
Joan-Francesc Mira i Casterà	1999-06-14
Joan Miralles i Monserrat	1985-06-14
Carles Miralles i Solà	1991-05-21
Jaume Miranda i Canals	2014-12-15
Joaquim Miret i Sans	1907-06-18
Isidre Molas	1993-11-22
Joaquim Molas i Batllori	1978-02-17
Francesc de Borja Moll i Casasnovas	1961-03-17
Aina Moll i Marquès	1993-11-22
Tomàs de Montagut Estragués	2001-12-17
Brauli Montoya Abat	2002-06-17
Miquel de Moragas i Spà	1990-05-07
Josep Moran i Ocerinjauregui	1995-05-22
Manuel Mundó i Marcet	1971-11-26
Joaquim Muns Albuixech	1987-02-13
Josep M. Muntaner i Pasqual	1979-01-12
Josep M. Nadal i Farreras	2009-02-23
Gabriel Navarro i Ortega	2005-02-28
Oriol Nel·lo i Colom	2009-02-23
Lluís Nicolau d'Olwer	1917-03-22
Joan Nogué i Font	2014-03-17
Raimon Noguera i Guzmán	1974-04-29
Josep Olesti i Vila	2014-12-15
Antoni Olivé i Ramon	2011-06-27
Miquel dels Sants Oliver i Tolrà	1907-06-18
Eugeni d'Ors i Rovira	1911-02-14
Jaume Pagès Fita	1992-10-23
Pere de Palol i Salellas	1978-04-14
Josep M. Panareda Clopés	2006-02-28
Ramon Parés i Farràs	1992-10-23
Àngels Pascual de Sans	2006-02-28
Vicent Pascual Granell	2013-02-25
Josep Peñuelas i Reixach	2014-06-16
Josep Perarnau i Espelt	1990-05-07
Juli Peretó i Magraner	1999-12-20
Manuel Pérez Saldanya	1997-06-09
Joan Peytaví Deixona	2005-02-28
August Pi i Sunyer	1911-02-14
Josep Piera Rubio	2005-02-28
Josep Pijoan i Soteras	1907-06-18
Ramon Pinyol i Torrents	2014-03-17
Vicent Pitarch i Almela	1985-06-14
Antoni Pladevall i Font	1990-05-07
Lluís B. Polanco i Roig	1989-11-27
Damià Pons i Pons	2015-03-02
Jaume Porta i Casanellas	1997-02-24
Miquel Àngel Pradilla Cardona	2005-06-13
Enric Prat de la Riba i Sarrà	1917-04-29
Modest Prats i Domingo	2005-06-13
Antoni Prevosti i Pelegrín	1978-02-17
Josep Puig i Cadafalch	1907-06-18
Jaume de Puig i Oliver	2008-06-16
Josep M. Puig Salellas	1988-01-29
Pere Puigdomènech i Rosell	2003-04-07
Enric Pujol i Casademont	2016-01-18
Joaquim M. Puyal i Ortiga	2009-12-21
Pere J. Quetglas i Nicolau	2016-02-15
Joaquim Rafel i Fontanals	1984-10-24
Enric Ras i Oliva	1978-02-17
Josep-Enric Rebés i Solé	2008-06-16
Salvador Reguant i Serra	1986-01-10
Ferran Requejo i Coll	2015-03-02
Jaume Reventós Puigjaner	2015-06-22
Oriol Riba i Arderiu	1978-03-17
Carles Riba i Bracons	1932-03-05
Carles-Enric Riba i Campos	2011-06-27
Manuel Ribas i Piera	1978-07-07
Antoni Riera i Melis	1996-06-17
Santiago Riera i Tuèbols	2002-06-17
Gemma Rigau i Oliver	2002-06-17
Manuel Riu i Riu	1990-05-07
Pere Roca i Fabregat	2004-06-14
Encarna Roca i Trias	1995-05-22
Antoni Roca Rosell	2014-12-15
Josep Roca-Pons	1989-11-03
Joan Rodés i Teixidor	1985-01-11
Joandomènec Ros i Aragonès	1990-09-17
Xavier Roselló i Molinari	2005-02-28
Vicenç M. Rosselló i Verger	1991-02-01
Albert Rossich i Estragó	2014-03-17
Xavier Rubert de Ventós	2005-06-13
Jordi Rubió i Balaguer	1942-05-01
Antoni Rubió i Lluch	1907-06-18
Joaquim Ruyra i Oms	1918-12-12
Flocel Sabaté i Curull	2015-03-02
Josep M. de Sagarra de Castellarnau	1942-05-01
Ferran de Sagarra i de Siscar	1920-01-22
Ferran Sagarra i Trias	2012-12-17
Jordi Salas-Salvadó	2013-02-25
Josep Maria Salrach i Marés	2007-02-26
Josep Samitier Martí	2016-01-18
Manuel Sanchis i Guarner	1961-03-17
Joan Sanmartí Grego	2007-02-26
Jordi Sans i Sabrafen	1994-06-06
Pere Santanach i Prat	1990-09-17
Jordi Sarsanedas i Vives	1991-05-21
Lluís Segalà i Estalella	1911-02-14
Mila Segarra i Neira	2005-02-28
Francesca Soledat Segura Beltrán	2015-06-22
Jaume Serra i Húnter	1927-03-23
Francesc Serra i Mestres	1990-09-17
Eva Serra i Puig	2002-06-17
Josep de Calassanç Serra i Ràfols	1949-03-12
Antoni Serra i Ramoneda	1987-02-13
Màrius Serra i Roig	2013-02-25
David Serrat i Congost	1996-06-17
Antoni Simon i Tarrés	2007-02-26
Ramon Sistac i Vicén	1998-12-14
Joan Solà i Cortassa	1999-12-20
Carles Solà	1992-10-23
Joan de Solà-Morales i Rubió	2012-12-17
Joan Antoni Solans i Huguet	2005-02-28
Ferran Soldevila i Zubiburu	1947-01-11
Carlota Solé i Puig	1990-05-07
Lluís Solé i Sabarís	1964-01-30
Narcís Soler i Masferrer	1996-06-17
Rolf Tarrach Siegel	2004-06-14
Miquel Tarradell i Mateu	1978-04-14
Josep Teixidor i Batlle	1967-12-15
Esteve Terradas i Illa	1911-02-14
Jaume Terradas i Serra	2004-06-14
Josep Maria Terricabras i Nogueras	1995-05-22
Ricard Torrents i Bertrana	1999-06-14
Joan Triadú i Font	1979-01-12
Ramon Trias i Fargas	1968-11-15
Josep Trueta i Raspall	1972-04-14
Ramon Turró i Darder	1911-02-14
Eduard Valentí i Fiol	1968-02-23
Ferran Valls i Taberner	1918-12-12
Francesc Vallverdú Canes	2002-06-17
Josep Vallverdú i Aixalà	1991-05-21
Josep Vaquer i Timoner	1978-07-07
Joan Veny i Clar	1978-11-17
Pere Verdaguer i Juanola	1993-06-07
Joan Vernet i Ginés	1978-04-14
Jaume Vicens i Vives	1958-05-09
Josep Vigo i Bonada	1978-03-17
Marc-Aureli Vila i Comaposada	1988-01-29
Pau Vila i Dinarès	1968-11-15
Mariàngela Vilallonga Vives	2005-02-28
Miquel Vilardell i Tarrés	2006-06-12
Josep M. Vilaseca i Marcet	1991-02-01
Joan Vilà-Valentí	1990-01-29
Joan Viñas i Salas	2010-12-13
Carles Viver i Pi Sunyer	2012-02-27
Jordi Vives i Puiggròs	2008-02-25
Xavier Vives i Torrents	2011-06-27

=== Correspondent members ===
Name	Date
Paul Aebischer	1946
Cosme Aguiló Adrover	2006-06-12
Anselm (Joaquim) Albareda i Ramoneda	1946
Pere Alberch i Vié	1994-11-21
Joan Alcover i Maspons	1916
Géza Alföldy	1996-12-16
Gabriel Alomar i Villalonga	1918
Agustí Altisent i Altisent	1975-12-19
Joan Amade	1945
Josep Amengual i Batle	1987-02-13
Ramon Amigó i Anglès	1994-06-06
Robert Archer	2000-06-19
Francesc Badia Gomis	2013-03-18
Francesc Ballone	2013-03-18
Jurgis Baltrušaitis	1945
Cebrià Baraut i Obiols	1974-03-15
Isidre Bartumeu Martínez	2013-03-18
Miquel Batllori i Munné	1951-06-09
Giovanni Maria Bertini	1966
Thomas Noël Bisson	1987-02-13
Carles Boix i Serra	2016-01-18
Gerardus Bolland	1916
Pierre Bonnassie	1987-02-13
Anthony Bonner	2016-02-15
Alberto Boscolo	1966
Jean Boutière	1958
Denise Boyer	2011-06-27
Josias Braun-Blanquet	1950
Clovis Brunel	1954
Jean-Auguste Brutails	1916
Robert I. Burns	1996-12-16
Josep Calmette	1945
Martina Camiade	2016-02-15
Esteve Canals	1958
Rafael Caria	2006-02-28
Efrem Compte i Roux	2008-02-25
Michel Contini	2006-02-28
Walter W. S. Cook	1946
Jordi Joaquim Costa i Costa	2006-02-28
Miquel Costa i Llobera	1918
Dominique de Courcelles	2008-02-25
Benedetto Croce	1916
Josep Cuatrecasas i Arumí	1954
Juan de Dalmau Mommertz	2012-12-17
Pierre Deffontaines	1964
Maurice Delbouille	1964
Michel Delseny	2007-02-26
Pierre Devambez	1974
Miquel Dolç i Dolç	1961
Leonardo Jesús Domínguez Sánchez-Bordona	1961
Frederic Duran i Jordà	1950
Francesc Duran i Reynals	1947
Marcel Durliat	1964-03-20
Francisco Elías de Tejada Spínola	1974
William J. Entwistle	1947
Lluís Esteva i Cruañas	1987
Georges Fabre	1996-12-16
Paul Fallot	1946
Kálmán Faluba	1992-11-23
Arturo Farinelli	1946
Miquel Ramon Ferrà i Juan	1946
Riccardo Filangieri di Candida Gonzaga	1935
Heinrich Finke	1924
Jordi Folch i Pi	1977
Pere Fouché	1946
Jean Frappier	1974
Paul Freedman	1996-12-16
Georges Gaillard	1948
Salvador Galmés i Sanxo	1945
Ernst Gamillscheg	1958
Arcadi Garcia i Sanz	1973
José Enrique Gargallo Gil	2014-05-19
Louis Gauchat	1917
Joan Genescà i Llongueras	2006-02-28
Wilhelm Giese	1974
Samuel Gili i Gaya	1955
Evarist Giné i Masdéu	1996-12-16
Alfred Giner-Sorolla	1992-11-23
Gonzalo Giribet	2014-03-17
Manuel González González	2009-12-21
Ignasi Miquel González i Llubera	1951
Maria Grossmann	2013-03-18
Josep Gudiol i Cunill	1922
Montserrat Guibernau i Berdun	2011-06-27
Christian Guilleré	2008-03-31
Joseph Gulsoy	1994-06-06
Gonzalo Halffter Salas	1994-06-06
Teófilo Hernando Ortega	1968
Jocelyn N. Hillgarth	1996-12-16
Harold Hóffding	1916
Iorgu Iordan	1975
Nikolas Jaspert	2008-03-31
Aurea Javierre Mur	1966
Alfred Jeanroy	1945
Jakob Jud	1918
Eduard Junyent i Subirà	1958
Simon Keay	2008-06-16
Georg Kremnitz	2014-06-16
Fritz Krüger	1947
Heinrich Kuen	1948
Arthur Långfors	1954
Christer Laurén	2014-03-17
Pierre Lavedan	1935
Rita Lejeune Dehousse	1974-04-29
Kurt Lewent	1958
Giovanni Lilliu	1973
Enric Artur Llobregat i Conesa	1987-02-13
Gabriel Llompart i Moragues	1987-02-13
Antoni Lloret i Orriols	1992-03-02
Joan F. López Casasnovas	2006-02-28
Helmut Lüdtke	2000-06-19
Henry de Lumley-Woodyear	1996-12-16
Adélio Alcino Sampaio Castro Machado	1992-11-23
René Maire	1947
Émile Mâle	1928
Joan Baptista Manyà i Alcoverro	1974
Adeodat (Francesc) Marcet i Poal	1946
Constantin Marinescu	1948
José Luis Martín Rodríguez	1996-12-16
Joan Massagué i Solé	1994-06-06
Federico Mayor Zaragoza	1997-06-09
Ramón Menéndez Pidal	1947
Joan Mercader i Riba	1987
Wilhelm Meyer-Lubke	1921
Georges Millardet	1921
Joan Moneva Puyol	1950
Angelo Monteverdi	1961
Magí Morera i Galícia	1916
Ambler H. Moss	2008-06-16
Carlos Ulises Moulines Castellví	2008-06-16
José María Murià Rouret	2016-01-18
Olimpio Musso	1996-12-16
Longí Navàs i Ferré	1916
Wilhelm Neuss	1947
Bob de Nijs	2000-06-19
Antoni Nughes	2014-03-17
Alexandre Olivar i Daydí	1973-07-06
Antoni Oriol i Anguera	1966
Amadeu Pagès	1945
Paul Painlevé	1917
José Antonio Pascual Rodríguez	1997-06-09
Edgar Allison Peers	1947
Àngel Pellicer i Garrido	1995-05-22
Santiago Pi i Sunyer	1957
Norberto Piccinini	1994-06-06
F. Xavier Pi-Sunyer	2007-02-26
Erhard-Wolfram Platzeck	1974
Lucien Poincaré	1917
Olivier Poisson	2008-03-31
Joan Pons i Marquès	1948
Josep Sebastià Pons	1961
Pere Ponsich	1973-07-06
Arthur Kingsley Porter	1928
Chadler Rathfon Post	1935
Paul Preston	2008-02-25
Robert Pring-Mill	1966-02-25
Pere Pujol i Tubau	1946
Josep Quer i Villanueva	2006-02-28
Artur Quintana i Font	2006-02-28
Lídia Rabassa Areny	2006-02-28
Jorge-Óscar Rabassa	1999-12-20
Philip D. Rasico	1997-06-09
Enric Ribes i Marí	2006-06-12
Gerhard Rohlfs	1950
Mario Roques	1948
Claude Roux	2007-02-26
Xavier Sáez-Llorens	2010-06-07
Charles Samaran	1975
Josep Sanchis i Sivera	1916
Lluís Antoni Santaló i Sors	1977-12-21
José Sarukhán Kermez	2009-12-21
Beatrice Schmid	1997-06-09
Elíes Serra i Ràfols	1966
Kenneth M. Setton	1958
Borís Pàvlovitx Sobolev	1992-05-17
Santiago Sobrequés i Vidal	1973
Camil Soula	1947
Leo Spitzer	1921
Friedrich Stegmüller	1961
Holger Konrad Sten	1966
Gregori M. (Ramon) Sunyol i Baulenas	1945
Joan Susplugas	1961
Robert B. Tate	1966-02-25
Giuseppe Tavani	1992-11-23
Arthur H. Terry	1992-11-23
Eduard Toda i Güell	1916
Antoni Torre	2007-02-26
Eliseu Trenc i Ballester	2008-06-16
Antoni Trias i Pujol	1970
Jaume Truyols i Santonja	1992-03-02
Jürgen Untermann	2008-06-16
Andrés Urrutia Badiola	2009-12-21
Veikko Väänänen	1974
Borís Konstantinòvitx Vainstein	1994-06-06
Juan Vallet de Goytisolo	1974
Miquela Valls	2009-02-23
Enric Valor i Vives	1986-10-24
Iuri Nicolàievitx Verxinin	1992-05-17
Pierre Vilar	1961-04-17
Salvador Vilaseca i Anguera	1973
Marià Villangómez i Llobet	1991-05-21
Johannes Vincke	1947
Max-Leopold Wagner	1947
Walther von Wartburg	1921
Jill Rosemary Webster	1996-12-16
Max Woodfield Wheeler	1997-06-09
Curt Wittlin	1997-06-09
Philippe Wolff	1964-03-20
Bartomeu M. (Baldiri) Xiberta i Roqueta	1946
Alan Yates	2006-02-28
Marie Claire Zimmermann	1997-06-09
Michel Zimmermann	1996-12-16
