= De las Casas (surname) =

De las Casas is a Spanish surname, more famously worn by Bartolomé de las Casas (1484–1566), Spanish historian, social reformer and Dominican friar. Other notable people with the surname include:

- Alberto de las Casas (died 1544), Catholic church figure
- Arán de las Casas (born 1989), Venezuelan actor and singer
- Dianne de Las Casas (1970–2017), Philippine-born American author and storyteller
- Emmanuel de Las Cases (1766-1842), French noble and writer
- Francisco de las Casas (1461–1536), 16th-century Spanish conquistador
- Horacio González de las Casas (1942–2025), Mexican politician
- José de Urrutia y de las Casas (1739–1803), Spanish captain general and military engineer
- Juan Bautista de las Casas (d. 1811), 18th-century Tejano revolutionary
- Julio Jesús de las Casas (born 1945), Venezuelan sports shooter
- Luis de Las Casas (1745–1800), Spanish Governor of Cuba
- Luis Felipe de Las Casas Grieve (1916–1988), Peruvian politician and engineer
- Manuel de las Casas (1940–2014), Spanish architect
- Mario de las Casas (1905–2002), Peruvian footballer

== Fictional characters ==
- Yunior de Las Casas, the subject of two short story collections by author Junot Diaz

== See also ==
- Fray Bartolomé de las Casas, a municipality in the department of Alta Verapaz
- San Cristóbal de las Casas, a town and municipality located in the state of Chiapas
  - San Cristóbal de las Casas National Airport
