= BTNL2 =

Protein-coding gene in the species Homo sapiens

Identifiers
- Aliases: BTNL2, BTL-II, BTN7, HSBLMHC1, SS2, butyrophilin like 2
- External IDs: OMIM: 606000; MGI: 1859549; GeneCards: BTNL2

Gene location (Human)
Chr.	Chromosome 6 (human)
Band	6p21.32	Start	32,393,339 bp
Band	6p21.32	End	32,407,181 bp

Gene location (Mouse)
Chr.	Chromosome 17 (mouse)
Band	17 B1|17 17.98 cM	Start	34,573,796 bp
Band	17 B1|17 17.98 cM	End	34,588,469 bp
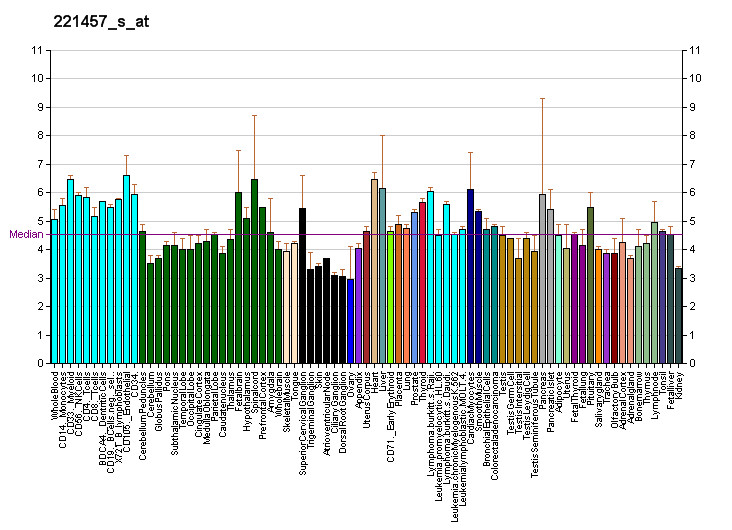
RNA expression pattern
Bgee	Human / Mouse (ortholog); Top expressed in: sural nerve; ventricular zone; gonad; ganglionic eminence; right ovary; lymph node; left ovary; superior frontal gyrus; smooth muscle tissue; endometrium / Top expressed in: jejunum; duodenum; granulocyte; morula; ileum; epithelium of small intestine; colon; stomach; thymus; esophagus; More reference expression data
BioGPS	More reference expression data
Gene ontology
Molecular function	signaling receptor binding
Cellular component	membrane; integral component of membrane; plasma membrane; external side of plasma membrane
Biological process	regulation of immune response; T cell receptor signaling pathway
Sources:Amigo / QuickGO
Orthologs
Databases	NCBI: entry; OMA: entry
Species	Human	Mouse
Entrez	56244	547431
Ensembl	ENSG00000225845; ENSG00000229741; ENSG00000226127; ENSG00000224770; ENSG00000225412 ENSG00000224242; ENSG00000229597; ENSG00000204290; ENSG00000275798	ENSMUSG00000024340
UniProt	Q9UIR0	O70355
RefSeq (mRNA)	NM_001304561; NM_019602	NM_079835
RefSeq (protein)	NP_001291490	NP_524574
Location (UCSC)	Chr 6: 32.39 – 32.41 Mb	Chr 17: 34.57 – 34.59 Mb
PubMed search
- Wikidata
View/Edit Human	View/Edit Mouse

Butyrophilin-like protein 2 is a protein that in humans is encoded by the BTNL2 gene.

Because it is associated with the immune system and the major histocompatibility complex, it has been implicated in many diseases (see further reading list below). A large scale study found it to be the protein under the most stringent selection in the human genome in 8 out of 12 geographic regions using the HKA test.
