= Scared Silly =

Scared Silly may refer to:

== Film ==
- Open Season: Scared Silly, 2015 film directed by David Feiss
- Scared Silly, 1927 film directed by Charles Lamont

== Television ==
- "Scared Silly", episode 1 of The Wacky Adventures of Ronald McDonald
- "Scared Silly", episode 35 of Ben 10
- "Scared Silly", episode 79 of Face Off
- "Scared Silly", episode 61 of Fraggle Rock
- "Scared Silly; Neighborhood Slingshot; Elmer's Garage", a sketch appearing in episode 19 of Life with Elizabeth
- "Scared Silly by Snakes", episode 34 of The Animals of Farthing Wood

== Books ==
- Scared Silly!: A Book for the Brave, a picture book by Marc Brown
- Scared Silly: A Halloween Treat, a picture book written by James Howe
- Scared Silly, a book in the Jo-Beth and Mary Rose Mysteries series written by Eth Clifford
- Scared Silly, a book by Mike Thaler
- Scared Silly: 25 Tales to Tickle and Thrill, a book by Dianne de Las Casas
- Scared Silly: Classic Hollywood Horror-Comedies, a book by Paul Castiglia
- Scared Silly!: SpongeBob's Book of Spooky Jokes, in SpongeBob SquarePants merchandise
