= Albiach =

Albiach is a Catalan surname. Notable people with the surname include:

- Anne-Marie Albiach (1937–2012), French poet and translator
- Jéssica Albiach (born 1979), Spanish politician
- Néstor Albiach (born 1992), Spanish footballer
- Mireia Casas Albiach
