= José Pérez Hervás =

Spanish writer, lexicographer, translator and publicist

- Born: 23 May 1880; Valencia
- Died: 21 July 1946 (aged 66)
- Occupations: Author, poet, translator, lexicographer
- Spouse: Flora Osete

José Pérez Hervás (23 May 1880 – 21 July 1946) was a Spanish writer, lexicographer, translator and publicist who also worked as art director of the Espasa Encyclopedia. He published works under both his real name and various pseudonyms, including: Pervás, Pimpín, Plinio «el Joven», Sávreh Zerepésoj, Singenio, Telégono, Urbi y Flora Ossette.

== Biography ==
=== Early life and youth ===
Born in Valencia, José was the youngest of three siblings, born to his parents – Santiago Pérez García and Magdalena Hervás y de Dios – after his sister Ángela (1875-1929) and his brother Santiago (1878-1933). When he was still very young his father died and his mother got remarried then to José Sánchez Agudo, who was director at the Military Hospital of Bilbao. The couple had two other sisters and another son. After the death of his stepfather, in 1889, his family started an application process for him to enroll in the War Orphans School of Guadalajara (Spain), which he eventually joined in 1891.

In 1897, when he was 17-year old, he enrolled in the Spanish army to fight in the Philippine Revolution. After leaving the Spanish army, he joined the Philippine army to fight in the Philippine–American War. After the end of the war he decided to spend a few years traveling around Asia. In 1901 he returned to Spain and was admitted to the Society of Jesus, working several years as a teacher. He left his position in the clergy in 1909 and settled in Barcelona.

=== Career in Barcelona ===
In 1910 he married Flora Osete, who also was an author and lexicographer. They had three daughters (Magdalena, Ángela and Florita) and a son (José). The three girls formed a trio known as 'Preziossette', a portmanteau combining the two surnames 'Pérez' and 'Osete'.

During his time in Barcelona, Pérez Hervás kept working as a foreign languages teacher and also held several positions in the publishing sector, namely as proof-reader, translator, author and art director. After nine years at the publishing house Montaner y Simón, in 1917, Pérez Hervás joined another publisher, Espasa, to work as a writer on its encyclopedia and became its art director in 1919. He held that position until 1933, when all the volumes of the encyclopedia got completed.

=== Conflict with Espasa-Calpe ===
According to Philippe Castellano, once the encyclopedia was completed, its editorial team was made redundant and offered a redundancy package, but Pérez Hervás was not happy with the offer and therefore decided to push back.

However, Luis Silva-Villar and Susana Silva Villar revealed more details on the nature of the conflict. According to these authors, Pérez Hervás was not only offered an economic compensation, but also a new role at the office of the company, merged by then with another entity and rebranded as Espasa-Calpe in Madrid. Once when the offer did not materialise, then he decided to establish an organisation mirroring the Bureau de l'Union Internationale pour la protection des oeuvres littéraires et artistiques to denounce numerous cases of copyright infringement by his former employer.

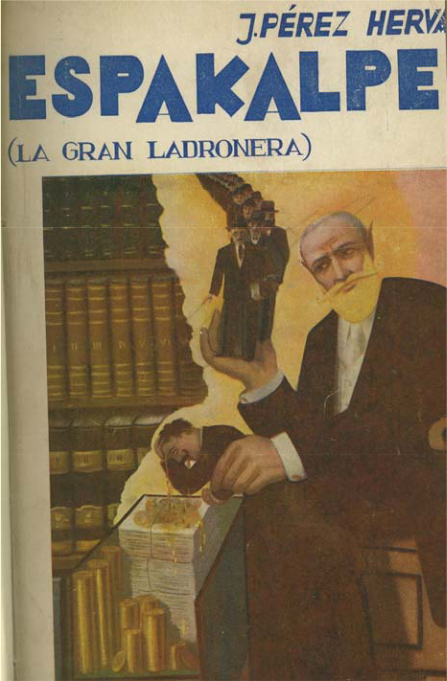
Cover of the book Espakalpe (José Pérez Hervás, 1934)

After trying to mobilise associations of publishers in Madrid and Barcelona, Pérez Hervás decided to write a book to make public the details of copyright infringements relating to the use of illustrations included into the encyclopedia. The book was self-published in 1935 through the Centro Enciclopédico de Cultura, under the title Espakalpe: La Gran Ladronera. The subtitle may be translated as The Great Den of Thieves.

In May 1935 various Spanish newspapers (ABC, El Día de Alicante, El Siglo Futuro y La Libertad) published an article reporting a scam by José Pérez Hervás and Manuel Navarro Celma to a well-known publishing house in Madrid. The news article depicts the two of them as criminals. It also presented the former as someone who deserted the Spanish army in Philippines and the later as an anarchist. According to the news, both of them were taken to the Modelo jail in Barcelona.

A few months after that, in September 1935, the Centro Enciclopédico de Cultura published an advert in the newspaper La Vanguardia announcing the upcoming release of the book Espakalpe. According to Silva-Villar and Susana Silva Villar it is reasonable to assume that some sort of agreement was reached then, considering that Pérez Hervás was acquitted and soon after, on the 9th of October, two of the above-mentioned newspapers (El Siglo Futuro y La Libertad) published a new note rectifying some of the information previously published. The update by El Siglo Futuro reported that Barcelona's court had revoked the bill of indictment and also clarified that Pérez Hervas did not leave the army to join the enemy but just decided to stay in the country when the Spanish troops left.

As a result of the conflict, the biographies of both Pérez Hervás and his wife and co-author Flora Osete were removed from the Espasa encyclopedia, and replaced with other content to avoid an alteration of page numbering.

These findings question the integrity of the whole encyclopedia, which supposedly had been reprinted over and over without any alterations on its content and any updates being published separately as appendices taking the form of new volumes.

=== Last years ===
After 1935 the life of Pérez Hervás is primarily focused on politics. During the Spanish Civil War he was involved in the newspaper Mi Revista, promoted by the CNT and UGT unions. The last trace of his activity dates back to 1939, when short note was published advertising his commercial dictionary

Pérez Hervás died in 1946.

== Works ==
As an author, Pérez Hervás was familiar with almost all literary genres, including poetry, novels, short stories and essays. His work as a lexicographer is particularly noteworthy and he also translated 20 works, most of them between 1911 and 1927.

=== Lexicography ===
- Gran Diccionario de la Lengua Castellana, initiated by Anicet de Pagès (1843-1902), then continued by Miguel Mir y Noguera (1841-1912) and eventually revised and completed by Pérez Hervás and Flora Osete.
- Manual de Rimas Selectas o Pequeño Diccionario de la Rima
- Diccionario de Correspondencia Comercial (Spanish, French, English, Italian and German).

=== Essays ===
Pérez Hervás published numerous articles in newspapers and magazines and also wrote several essays published along some of the works by other authors he translated.

One of the most relevant essays he published was a history of the renaissance in three volumes: Historia del Renacimiento, Montaner y Simón, 1916.

In 1935 he published Espakalpe, already discussed in the previous section.

=== Novels ===
- Joyas del aire, 1910.
- Brani, 1911.
- El hijo de la momia, 1913.

=== Short stories ===
- El cirio de arroba, en La Ilustración Artística (24/10/1910)
- La viudez de Luisa, en La Ilustración Artística (23/10/1911)
- El hijo del verdugo, en La Ilustración Artística (08/04/1912)
- La mismísima energía, en La Ilustración Artística (08/07/1912)
- El llanto de Alfredo, en La Ilustración Artística (10/03/1913)
- Mutua salvación, en La Ilustración Artística (16/06/1913)
- La madre aviadora, en La Ilustración Artística (20/10/1913)
- Amor perjuro, en La Ilustración Artística (11/05/1914)
- El "Don Carlos" de la Costa, en La Ilustración Artística (31/08/1914)
- Alma Baturra, en La Ilustración Artística (14/09/1914)
- La Gargantilla, en La Ilustración Artística (22/02/1915)
- La aventura de Jonás, en La Ilustración Artística (21/06/1915)
- La Ruth alcareña, en La Ilustración Artística (10/07/1916)
- Cosmogonía japonesa, en La La Ilustración Artística (02/10/1916)
- 'El Ama' y 'Dulcinea', dentro del libro Las mujeres de Cervantes, 1916, de José Sánchez Rojas
- Las diez moneditas, en La Ilustración Española y Americana (08/10/1918)
- Lorito real, en La Ilustración Española y Americana (08/11/1918)
- La maldición de Elvira, en La Ilustración Española y Americana (30/03/1919)
- El padre elegido, en Diario de Alicante (30/08/1927)
- Alma fascista, en Mi Revista (15/02/1937)
- Sor Fai, en Mi Revista (15/03/1937)

=== Translations ===
- El convite del divino amor, 1911, Giuseppe Frassinetti. Barcelona: Eugenio Subirana.
- El cerro perdido ó Un cuento de Sonora, 1911, Thomas Mayne-Reid. Versión castellana de José PÉREZ HERVÁS. Edición ilustrada. Barcelona: Francisco Seix.
- Tomás Alva Edison: Sesenta años de la vida íntima del gran inventor, 1911, F. A. Jones. Traducida al español por José Pérez Hervás. Edición ilustrada. Biblioteca Universal. Barcelona: Montaner y Simón.
- Municipalización y nacionalización de los Servicios Públicos, 1912, Sir John Lubbock. Traducción de la tercera edición inglesa por José Pérez Hervás. Barcelona: Eugenio Subirana
- Rodney Stone, 1912, Arthur Conan Doyle. Traducción de José Pérez Hervás. Edición ilustrada. Barcelona: Sopena.
- China: dos años en la Ciudad Prohibida. Vida íntima de la Emperatriz Tzu Hsi, 1913, Der Ling. Versión de José Pérez Hervás. Edición ilustrada. Barcelona: Montaner y Simón.
- Los terrores del radio, 1913, Albert Dorrington. Traducción de José Pérez Hervás. Edición ilustrada. La Ilustración Artística. Barcelona: Montaner y Simón.
- La mujer y el trabajo, 1914, Olive Schreiner. Edición ilustrada. Barcelona: Montaner y Simón. Traducción española firmada por Flora Ossette y atribuida a Pérez Hervás.
- La isla del tesoro, 1914, Robert Louis Stevenson. Versión castellana de José Pérez Hervás. Barcelona: Editorial Ibérica.
- Narraciones de un cazador, 1914, Ivan Tugueneff. Barcelona: Editorial Ibérica. Traducción anunciada como directa del ruso por F. O y atribuida a Pérez Hervás, pese a no ser conocedor de dicha lengua.
- El Dinamitero, 1914 or 1915, Robert Louis Stevenson. Versión directa del inglés por José Pérez Hervás. Barcelona: Editorial Ibérica.
