= Montserrat Aguadé =

Spanish geneticist

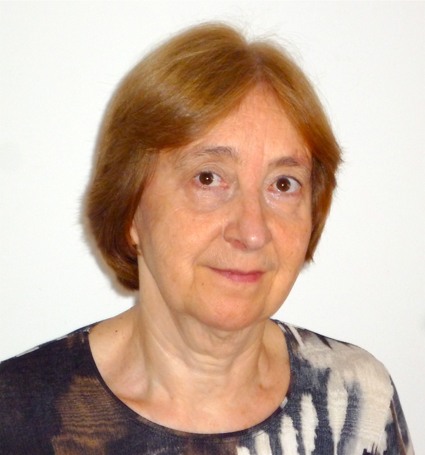
- Born: Montserrat Aguadé Porres; 1949 (age 76–77); Barcelona, Spain
- Occupation: Professor of genetics
- Employer: Universitat de Barcelona
- Known for: Evolution, Population genetics

Montserrat Aguadé Porres (Barcelona, Spain; 1949) is a professor emeritus of genetics at University of Barcelona and member of the Institut d'Estudis Catalans.

Aguadé is internationally recognized for her research in the fields of evolution and population genetics, and together with Richard R. Hudson and Martin Kreitman, she co-developed the HKA test, a statistical test used in genetics to evaluate the predictions of the neutral theory of molecular evolution.

Aguadé has published around 100 scientific articles in prestigious journals in the field of experimental sciences, and she has been awarded the National Genetics Award from the Spanish Society of Genetics. Prof. Aguadé has been recognized as a distinguished researcher by the Generalitat de Catalunya and, in 2022, she was awarded the Gold Medal for Scientific Merit by the City Council of Barcelona.

Aguadé has been the president of the Society for Molecular Biology and Evolution and the president of the Spanish Society of Genetics, as well as, a member of the direction committee of the Catalan Society of Biology from the Institut de Estudis Catalans.

== Bibliography ==
- Hudson, Richard R., Martin Kreitman, and Montserrat Aguadé. "A test of neutral molecular evolution based on nucleotide data." Genetics 116.1 (1987): 153–159.
- Clark, Andrew G., et al. "Evolution of genes and genomes on the Drosophila phylogeny." Nature 450.7167 (2007): 203–218.
- Clark, Andrew G., et al. "Variation in sperm displacement and its association with accessory gland protein loci in Drosophila melanogaster." Genetics 139.1 (1995): 189–201.
- Comeron, Josep M., Martin Kreitman, and Montserrat Aguadé. "Natural selection on synonymous sites is correlated with gene length and recombination in Drosophila." Genetics 151.1 (1999): 239–249.
- Kirkness, Ewen F., et al. "Genome sequences of the human body louse and its primary endosymbiont provide insights into the permanent parasitic lifestyle." Proceedings of the National Academy of Sciences 107.27 (2010): 12168-12173.
