= Christer Laurén =

Finnish philologist

Hans Christer Laurén (3 July 1942 – 19 September 2022) was a Finnish philologist.

He was born in Helsingfors. After finishing his secondary education in Gamlakarleby in 1961, he graduated from Åbo Akademi with the fil.mag. degree in 1965 and the fil.lic. degree in 1969. He was employed at Vaasa Business School (later Vaasa University) in 1970, and took his doctorate in 1972. His doctoral thesis Predikanten som översättare was about Jons Budde. From 1975 to his retirement in 2009 he was a professor of Swedish language. He also served as prorector from 1990 to 1994. Later books include Normer för finlandssvenskan (1985), Från kunskapens frukt till Babels torn. En bok om fackspråk (with Marianne Nordman, 1987) and Språkbad. Forskning och praktik (1999).

Laurén served as a member of the Swedish Language Council of Finland from 1976 to 1994, chairing the council for the last nine years, and as a member of the Language Council of Sweden from 1986 to 1994. He was a fellow of the Norwegian Academy of Science and Letters from 2004. In 2014 he became a corresponding member of the Institut d'Estudis Catalans. He died in September 2022.
