= Las Casas del Conde =

- Municipality
- Flag Coat of arms

- Location in Salamanca
- Coordinates: 40°30′27″N 6°2′30″W
- Country: Spain
- Autonomous community: Castile and León
- Province: Salamanca
- Comarca: Sierra de Francia

Government
  - Mayor: Adelia López Hoyos (PSOE)

Area
  - Total: 1 km^{2} (0.39 sq mi)
- Elevation: 720 m (2,360 ft)

Population (2025-01-01)
  - Total: 63
  - Density: 63/km^{2} (160/sq mi)
- Time zone: UTC+1 (CET)
  - Summer (DST): UTC+2 (CEST)
- Postal code: 37659

Las Casas del Conde is a tiny village and municipality in the province of Salamanca, western Spain, part of the autonomous community of Castile-Leon. It is located 78 kilometres (48 mi) from the provincial capital city of Salamanca and has a population of only 55 people.

The municipality covers an area of 1 km^{2} (0.39 sq mi) and it lies 720 metres (2,360 ft) above sea level and the postal code is 37659.

== History ==
As most of the towns of the region, Las casas del Conde was born to history during the Christian repopulation, initiate in the days of Alfonso IX of Leon (1065–1109) into the hands of its son-in-law, the count Raimundo of Burgundy. As the wars of the Muslims continued threatening Christian Spain, Alfonso IX intensifies the repopulation activity and fortifies this zone, that also is border with the Kingdom of Castilla. So and as he comes off himself the origin of his name, soon the municipality happens to consist of the jurisdiction of the Count de Miranda del Castañar, with the economic dependency that it supposes, due to the establishment of the feudal rents, applied to all the economic and materials goods of the neighbours. An important brake for the development of the town, until in 1757, the King grants the title from villa to the Houses of the Count, adjudging to him great part of the land of El Cabaco, Nava de Francia and el Casarito. This distribution originated the beginning of larguísimo lawsuit between the Houses and the Cabaco, in which they did not lack fights, attempts of murder and until the presence of soldiers, sent by the governor of the district, that lived in Ciudad Rodrigo. Some authors relate that those of Las Casas del Conde, but aggressive by their condition of “serranos”, hurt, stabbed and until they left badly unemployed very serious to several neighbours of El Cabaco. In 1763 the cause in favour of the cabaqueños was failed, that recovered their communal mounts. The complete acts of this lawsuit occupy nothing less than 1720 handwritten folio pages and the sentence is contained in another volume of 180 pages. Years before, the neighbours of the Houses also had serious disputes with Mogarraz, by the operation of the meadow of Santa Coloma. In 1672 there was a dead and several wounded in one fight, which triggered a time of greater understanding, and the following year signed the peace, paying Mogarraz 14300 real by the meadow. Nevertheless, the lawsuits continue throughout the years by problems of advantage of dry trees without fruit, pruning, coasts, you select, etc., giving rise to the sentence of the Real Chancillería de Valladolid, executory of the 28 of February 1738, in reference to the places of the mount of Peñalvo, already regulated in decrees of the third count of Miranda, and to the estates towards San Blas and the environs of the Francia river.

== Climate and natural surroundings ==
Las Casas del Conde is located next to the Francia River, born in the mountain range with the same name, Sierra de Francia. As all mountain rivers its waters are crystalline and it runs between trees like alder and ash that tend to look for the solar light reaching great altitude forming a tunnel around the river which contributes in the summer period to enjoy in its surroundings of a peace, only disturbed by the noise the water. It has a privileged microclimate, given by its geographic situation, which allows the culture of all fruit trees type (cherry trees, fig trees, apple trees, pear trees, olive trees, grapevine etc. those of Mediterranean type (Orange trees, shaft etc.). Vegetation are even very rich in aromatic plants (thyme, Pot Marjoram, etc.). In January the narcissuses have bloomed around the river or the humid meadows, which gives us an idea of the climate given by its geographic situation (inside between two mountains, next to the river mentioned and oriented to the projection.

== Sightseeing ==
Church of Santa Catalina. Hermitage of the Humilladero. Interesting urban center. Exceptional natural viewpoint

== Services ==
Recreational zone “Peñalvo”: is 500 metres (1,600 ft) from the urban center. A local highway heads toward Mogarraz.

== Celebrations ==
Celebrations of Santo Cristo and Virgin of the Triumph: 7, 8 and 9 of August.

== Gallery ==
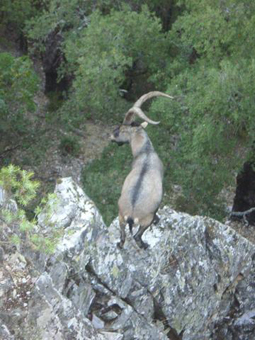
Capra pyrenaica victoriae in Las Casas del Conde, Sierra de Francia

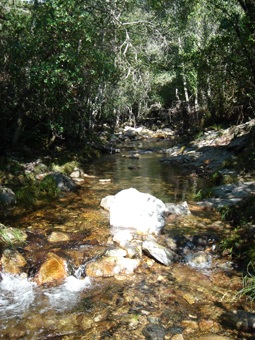
Francia River on Las Casas del Conde

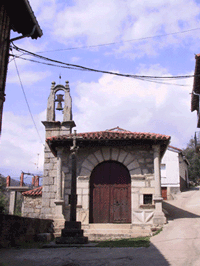
Las Casas del Conde hermitage

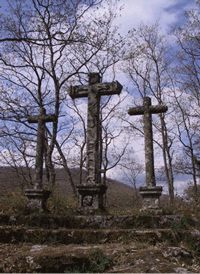
Calvario de Las Casas del Conde
