= David Zamora Casas =

Mexican American visual artist, performance artist, and community activist

- Born: 1960 (age 65–66)
- Notable work: Portrait of a Burnout (1993), Love has no Gender (1993)
- Style: performance art, visual art
- Website: www.davidzamoracasas.com

David Zamora Casas (born 1960) is a Mexican-American visual artist, performance artist, and community activist based in San Antonio, Texas who has been active since 1985. His work addresses his identity as a gay Chicano artist and explores themes of androgyny, queerness, and redefining traditional Mexican art. Casas is a self-described "artivist" who creates paintings, installations, altars, and performance works.

When Annette Dimeo Carlozzi asked the artist how his public persona developed, Zamora Casas replied: "it evolved through my discovery of my gay voice. And my coming out came through a lot of sacrifice. I wanted my voice to be the 'first voice' that said, 'I am a Chicano, this is what Chicano art is; I am gay, this is what gay art is.' All these perspectives, not limited to any specific one. This is my reality, my identity, my art."

Picante, the artist's window installation at ArtPace (2010), was described as: "Rooted in the Mexican tradition of Catholic home devotional altars and inspired by the San Antonio landscape, Picante fuses Aztec imagery and magical realism, whimsically reflecting on both global and personal concerns."

Chicano art scholar Tomás Ybarra-Frausto, who wrote an influential essay about rasquachismo (the rasquache sensibility in Chicano culture) described Casas's paintings as a "mix word and image to visualize autobiographical and universal stories of homoerotic love, loss and persistent social concerns including immigration, environmental plunder, gender disparity and the multiple issues facing marginalized individuals and communities."

In 2024, Casas created an installation called Altar for the Spirit of Rasquachismo: Homenaje a Tomás Ybarra Frausto for the Xicanx exhibition at Blue Star in San Antonio. The artist refers to this as a "Día de los Muertos inspired – and subverted – altar." Ybarra-Frausto's rasquachismo essay, which addressed the underdog creators who utilized objects at hand, "articulated the things I felt in real life, it was a eureka moment," said the artist. "It was an undeniable reflection of my experiences and those of the Mexican-origin community. He made these things tangible and real." Casas also dedicated this altar to Dudley Brooks, Ybarra-Frausto's long-time partner, who died shortly before the exhibition opened. Casas recalls: "When I was growing up, jotos y manfloras [Chicano/a queers and lesbians] were not represented with dignity. Tomás and Dudley served as inspiration. They were role models, people we looked up to. They were professionals, respectable citizens in our society, as well as loving, caring individuals."

A Casas installation devoted to the musician Selena called "Selena's Cosmic House of Consciousness" is featured in the exhibition "The Selena Effect" at the Wittliff Collections, Texas State University in 2025.

== Works ==
=== Installations/Performance ===
- Despedida de NALAC ( National Association of Latino Arts and Culture) Installation, retirement celebration for director Maria Deleon, 2024.
- UTSA Residency "Democratizing Racial Justice," collaborative project with writer Barbara Renaud Gonzalez, 2024.
- Luminaria Contemporary Art Festival, 15 year anniversary, "Quinceanera." Lead artist and creator of Casa Colibri collective, 2023.
- Artivist Magic performance and discussion, Hispanic Heritage Month, Northwest Vista College, San Antonio, TX, 2023.
- Installation in conjunction with the exhibition "XICANX: Dreamers and Change Makers / Soñadores y Creadores de Cambio," University of British Columbia, Museum of Anthropology, Vancouver, Canada, 2022. Subsequently traveled to Blue Star, San Antonio.
- Love and Death in Times of Pandemic/Amor y La Muerte en Tiempos de Pandemia, Installation at Bihl Haus, San Antonio, 2020.
- McNay At Museum, installation in conjunction with "Transamerica/n: Gender, Identity, and Appearance Today," San Antonio, TX, 2019.
- "SAFE SEX EDUCATION PROJECT," performance art event addressing HIV / AIDS, Changez Nightclub, San Antonio, TX, 1987.

== Awards ==
- 2020 City of San Antonio SA Cares Covid relief grant award, San Antonio, TX
- 2020 - 2021 Inaugural Artist-in-Residence, Bihl Haus Arts, San Antonio, TX
- 2019 - TransAmerica/n Gender, Identity, Appearance Today, "El Arcoíris" Altar commission for McNay Art Museum, San Antonio, TX
- 2019-current, Casa Colibrí Artist-in-Residence
- 2018 National Association of Latino Arts and Culture (NALAC), San Antonio Individual Artist Grant
- 2011 National Association of Latino Arts and Culture (NALAC), Leadership Institute, San Antonio, TX
- 2010 San Antonio Artist’s Supplemental Grant, ArtPace, WindowWorks, Antonio, TX
- 2007-08 Best of Show Award for "Hecho a Mano," Guadalupe Cultural Arts Center, San Antonio, TX
- 2001 Coronado Studios Series Project, Austin, TX
- 2011 Social and Public Art Resource Center (SPARC) Mural Commission, Venice, CA
- 1996 Henry B. GonzáleConvention Center, "Cuentos de Yanaguana," City of San Antonio Department of Arts and Cultural Aairs, Public Art mural commission, San Antonio, TX
- 1994 Artpace, International Artist-in-Residence Program, Installation, San Antonio, TX 1993 Artpace, London Studio Residency Program, London, England
- 1992 El Nuevo Mestizo, Individual Artist Grant, City of San Antonio Department of Arts and Cultural Aairs, San Antonio, TX
- 1992 New Forms Regional Initiatives Grant, N.E.A., Andy Warhol and the Rockefeller Foundation

== Public Collections ==
- San Antonio Museum of Art, San Antonio, TX
- The Sandra Cisneros Papers, Witcliff Collections, Texas State University, San Marcos, TX.

== Books and Catalogs ==
- ArtPace (Foundation: San Antonio, Tex), and International Artist-in-Residence Program. (1996). New Works 95.3: Antony Gormley, David Avalos, David Zamora Casas. San Antonio, Tex.: ArtPace.
- Chicago Literary Hall of Fame. Lifetime Achievement Award, Sandra Cisneros. (2021), pp. 51–53.
- Cordova, Ruben Charles. (2019). The Day of the Dead in Art. San Antonio: Centro de Artes San Antonio.
- Cortez, Marisol. Luz at Midnight. (2020). FlowerSong Press. (Cover art by David Zamora Casas).
- DiverseWorks, Voices from a Queer Nation: OUT lesbian and gay Artist living in Texas. (1991). DiverseWorks Houston, Texas pp. 47, 48.
- Durán, Yolanda, René H. Arceo-Frutos, and Mexican Fine Arts Center—Museum (Chicago, Ill). (1993). Art of the Other México: Sources and Meanings. Chicago, Ill.: Mexican Fine Arts Center Museum.
- Keller, Gary D., Mary Erickson, Kaytie Johnson, Joaquín Alvarado, Arturo J. Aldama, and Craig Smith. (2002). Contemporary Chicana and Chicano Art: Artists, Works, Culture, and Education. Tempe, Arizona: Bilingual Press/Editorial Bilingüe, p. 304.
- Marchi, Regina M. (2022). Day of the Dead in the USA: The Migration and Transformation of a Cultural Phenomenon. Second edition. New Brunswick: Rutgers University Press. ISBN 9781978821644.
- Pace, Linda, Jan Jarboe Russell, Eleanor Heartney, and Kathryn Kanjo. (2014). Dreaming Red: Creating ArtPace. New York: Trinity University Press, pp. 251, 297-98. https://search.ebscohost.com/login.aspx?direct=true&scope=site&db=nlebk&db=nlabk&AN=932834.
- Sayre, Henry M., ed. A World of Art, 9th Edition. (2022). Oregon State University, Cascades Campus.
- Zamora Casas, David, Rita Urquijo-Ruiz, and Bilh Haus Arts (San Antonio, Tex). (2010). Ancient Guardians of the Sky. [San Antonio]: Bilh Haus Arts.
