= Henryka Beyer =

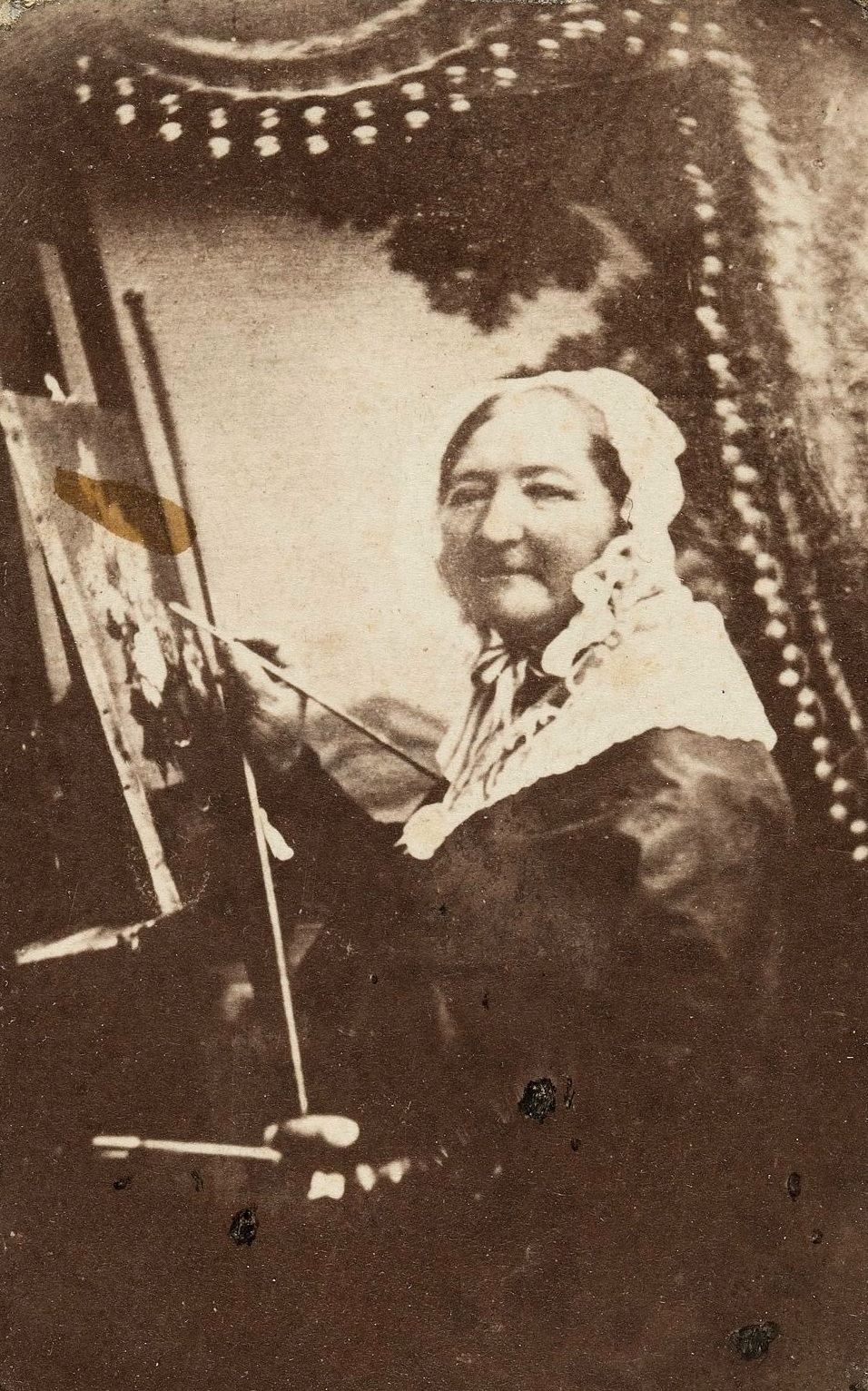
- Born: 7 March 1782; Szczecin, Poland (then Prussia)
- Died: 24 November 1855 (aged 73); Chrzanów, Poland
- Known for: Painting
- Spouse: John Gottlieb Wilhelm Beyer (m. 1813–1819)

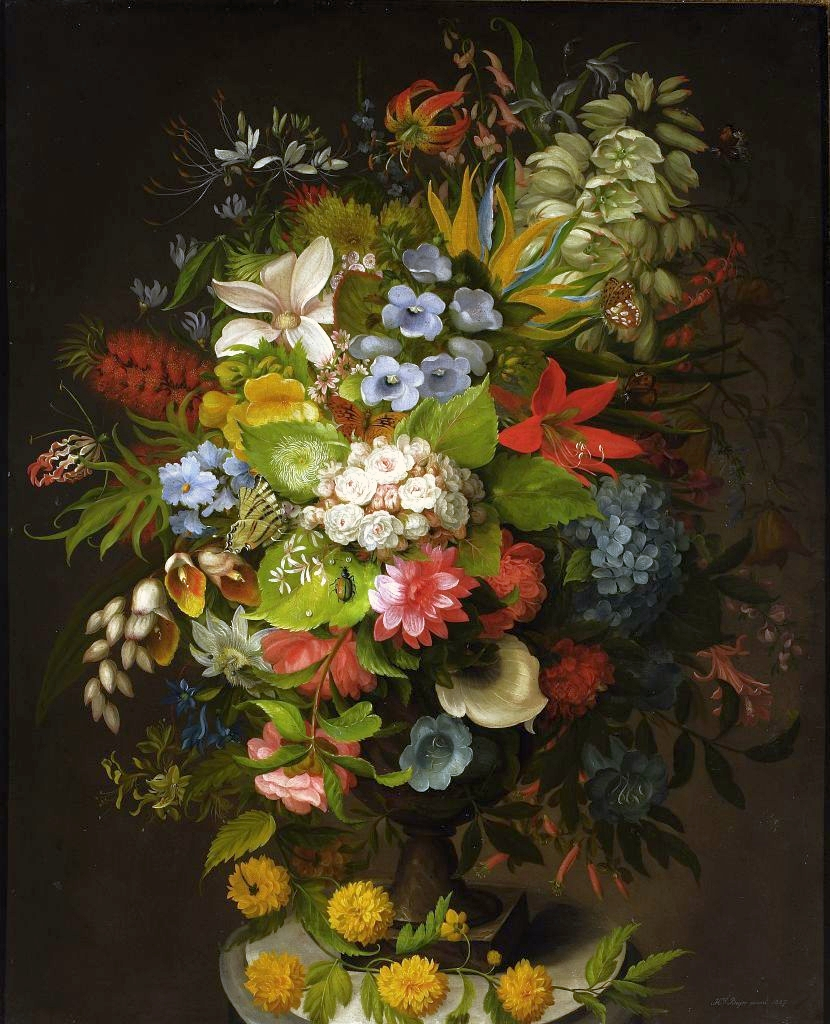
A bouquet of flowers in a vase by Henryka Beyer, National Museum, Warsaw, 1827

Henryka Beyer (7 March 1782 – 24 October 1855) was a German painter active in Poland. She was the youngest sister of Wilhelm Henryk Minter, an architect.

== Life and career ==
Born in Szczecin (then called Stettin, and part of the Holy Roman Empire and the Kingdom of Prussia), Beyer was initially taught by local painter Petera Schmidta. In 1805, she moved to Berlin (the capital of the Kingdom of Prussia) with her brother Charles Frederick and studied under the Director of the KPM (Königliche Porzellan-Manufaktur), Gottfried Wilhelm Volker.

In 1811, Beyer moved to Warsaw (then the capital of the French client state the Duchy of Warsaw), where she was trained by Antoni Brodowski. In 1813, she married the director of the Warsaw lottery John Gottlieb Wilhelm Beyer, converting from the Lutheran faith to Calvinism. They had three sons; the youngest, Charles Adolf, was born in 1818. Widowed the next year in 1819, Beyer had to maintain her sons and in 1824 in Warsaw opened a school of painting and drawing for women. She ran it until 1835. She painted still lifes, mostly watercolors, usually in dark warm colors. Beyer initialed her works HKA.

She died in 1855 in Chrzanów near Warsaw and is buried in the cemetery next to the children of Calvinist in Warsaw (q E, row 3, No. 13).

The poet Stanisław Jachowicz honored her memory with the following lines for her obituary:

Prosta jak kwiatek, co go malowała/W niebiańskie strojny klejnoty,/Prawda w jej słowie, a w czynach jej – chwała,/W życiu zachęta do cnoty (Simple as a flower, as it painted / W heavenly adorned with jewels, / The truth in her words and her actions - glory, / In the life of an incentive to virtue).

== See also ==
- List of Poles
