= Francia (river) =

River in Spain

Coordinates: 40°29′21″N 6°00′40″W

Las Batuecas-Sierra de Francia Natural Park

The Francia (Spanish: río Francia) is a 25 km long tributary of the Alagón, a right-hand tributary of the Tagus. Its source is at 1,350 m in the Valle de Lera (Sierra de Francia). It flows into the Alagón at a height of 420 m.

The importance of this river lies in the fact that it gives its name to the Sierra de Francia, south of Salamanca. Part of its course falls within the Las Batuecas-Sierra de Francia Natural Park protected area.

== References and external links ==
- Diputación de Salamanca - Turismo - Sierra de Francia.
- Ruta por el Parque Natural Las Batuecas-Sierra de Francia.
