= Flora Osete =

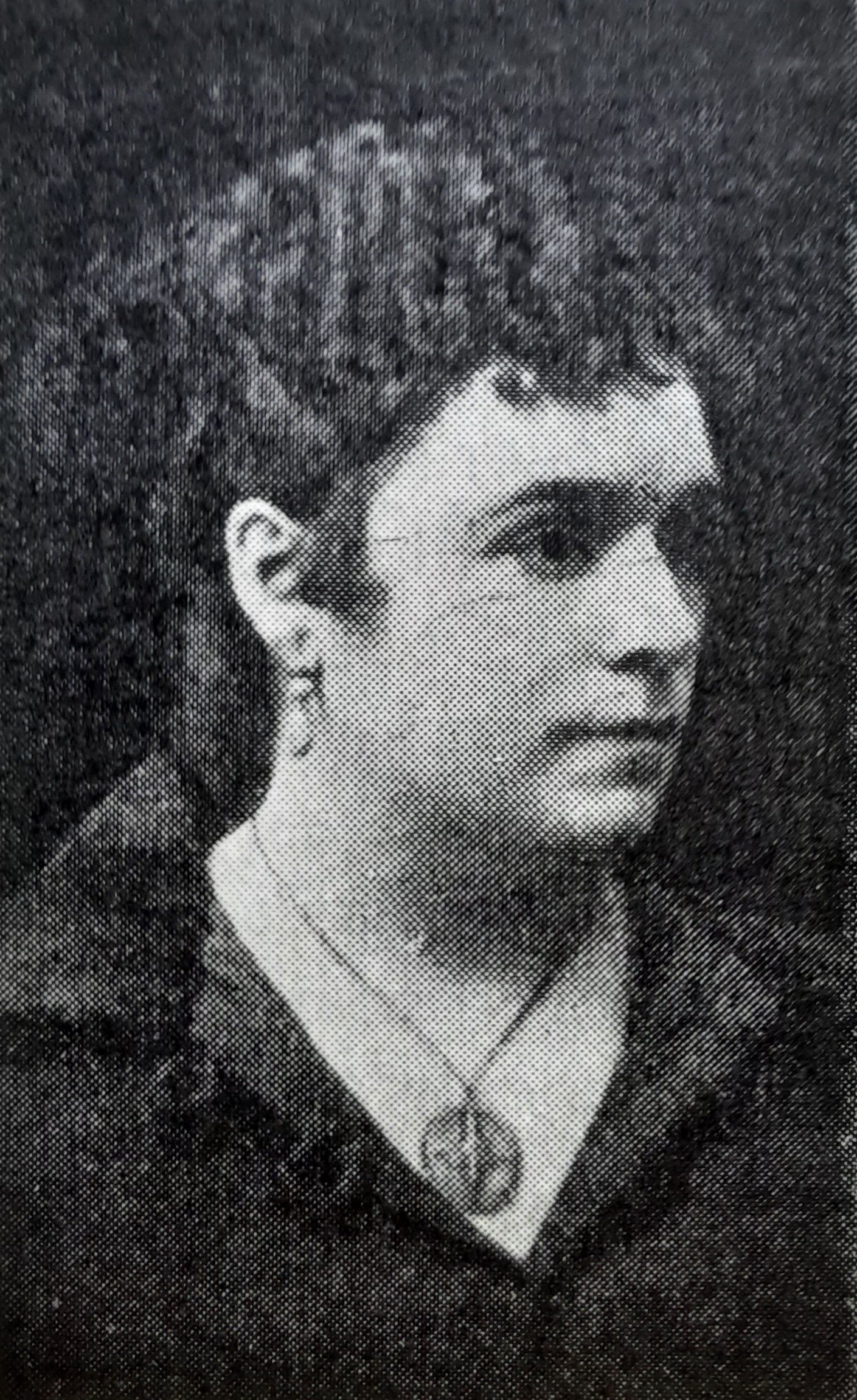
- Born: Florentina Osete Casas; 1883; Fuente Álamo de Murcia, Spain
- Occupations: Lexicographer, translator, writer
- Notable work: Gran diccionario de la lengua castellana
- Spouse: José Pérez Hervás (m. 1910)
- Children: 4

Florentina Osete Casas (born 1883; year of death unknown), also known as Flora Osete or Ossette, was a Spanish lexicographer, translator, and writer, co-author of the Gran diccionario de la lengua castellana (Great Dictionary of the Spanish Language) from 1902 to 1932.

== Biography ==
The little that is known of Osete's life is collected in the entry that the Encyclopaedia Espasa (vol. 40, 1919: p. 846) included in its first editions. She studied in Cartagena and Barcelona, where she wrote for illustrated fashion publications, particularly El Salón de la Moda. She translated works from French and English into Spanish, although her best-known translation, signed Flora Ossette, was Woman and Labour by the South African writer Olive Schreiner, which is thought to be the work of her husband José Pérez Hervás.

She married Pérez in 1910, with whom she had a son and three daughters: José, Magdalena, Ángela, and Florita. She collaborated with him on some works, including the Gran diccionario de la lengua castellana. The Ossete variant of her surname was used as an artistic flourish by members of the family – the musical trio formed by their daughters presented themselves as Preziossette, a portmanteau of "Pérez and Ossette". In the same vein, their daughter Angela, a composer and pianist, adopted the professional name of Pérez Ossette.

== Translations ==
The first translation signed by Osete, under the initials FO, was A Sportsman's Sketches by Ivan Turgenev (Editorial Ibérica, 1914). Pérez used Osete's name again, slightly transformed into Flora Ossette, to sign the translation of Woman and Labour by Olive Schreiner. At a time when it was common for women to hide their names behind their husbands' (as in the case of Gregorio Martínez Sierra and María Lejárraga), the motivation in this case was commercial. A woman's name on the cover was used to enhance a work's appeal to feminists, a fairly common practice at the publisher Montaner y Simón. Literary critics have noted an amplification and seeming endorsement of Schreiner's feminist ideas in the translation.

== Gran diccionario de la lengua castellana ==
Osete was co-author of the Gran diccionario de la lengua castellana (Great Dictionary of the Spanish Language), a work that was commissioned by Anicet de Pagès, under whose authorship the first two volumes were published in 1902 and 1904. After Pagés' death in 1902, after having produced only a few notebooks of the work, the publishing group, under the direction of Miguel Mir, took charge of the publication of the first two volumes. Mir died in December 1912, so the work was orphaned for a second time.

Pérez took charge of the work and, together with Osete, contributed to volume III with four entries for the letter M: montar, morisqueta, mujer, and mundo. Their work continued in volumes IV and V, although only Perez's name appears as the author responsible. In all they contributed 511 entries: 267 signed by Pérez and 244 by Osete. Hers occur more frequently toward the end of the work, and display a varied typology, with special attention given to invented, improvised, or prefabricated words. Thanks to these entries, Osete became ones of the most cited authorities of the 20th century on a lexicographical work, as she helped document newly created or recently introduced words. The Royal Spanish Academy (RAE) included this work within its lexicographical corpus.
