= Rosalba Casas =

Mexican sociologist

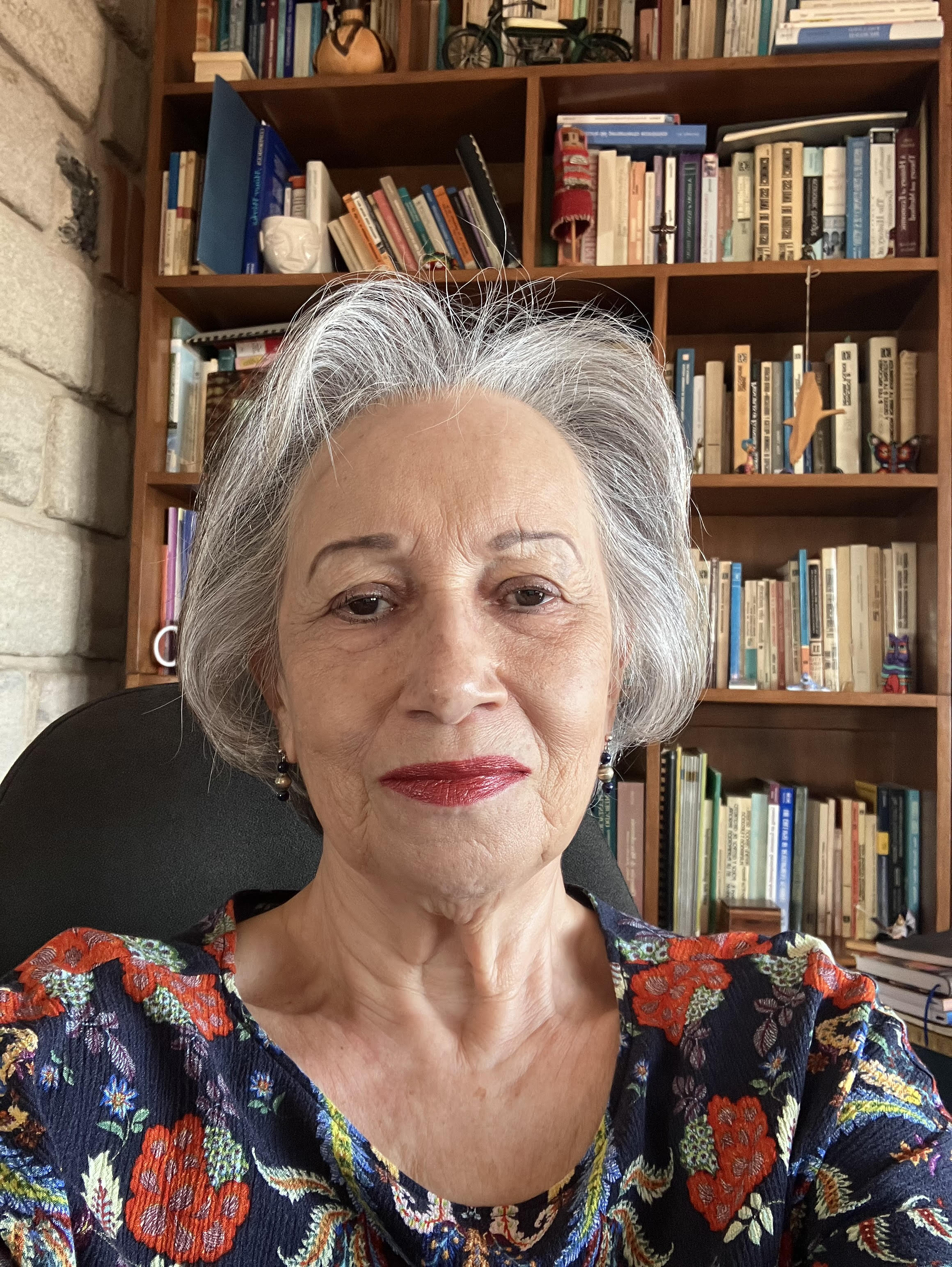
Rosalba Casas

Rosalba Casas Guerrero (born 1950) is a professor of History and Socio-politics at the Montreal University in Canada.

== Education ==
Casas studied sociology at the National Autonomous University of Mexico (UNAM), and has a PhD in Science and Technology Policy from the University of Sussex in England.

== Career and research ==
She is a regular member of the Mexican Academy of Sciences. She was the Director of the Social Research Institute at the UNAM from 2005 to 2013. She has written or co-written more than 10 books and more than 70 articles.

Casas' academic interests revolve around the development of science and technology and their potential to improve the life quality of different communities. She focuses on new understandings of public policy that put social problems that can be solved through expanded knowledge front and center. Her research has contributed to conversations about the social role of science and technology, and the strategic role of the state in developing countries to impulse STEM activities.

== Selected works ==
- El estado y la política de la ciencia en México, 1935-1970, 1985
- Institucionalización de la política gubernamental de ciencia y tecnología, 1970-1976, 1986
- La biotecnología y sus repercusiones socioeconómicas y políticas, 1992
- Biotechnology and environmental concerns in Mexico : arguments for a research proposal, 1992
- Biotechnology in Mexico : opportunities and constraints in the agroindustrial sector, 1993
- La investigación biotecnológia en México : tendencias en el sector agroalimentario, 1993
- Las políticas sociales de México en los años noventa, 1996
- Gobierno, academia y empresas en México : hacia una nueva configuración de relaciones, 1997
- Ciencia, Tecnología y Poder. Elites y Campos de Lucha por el Control de las Política, 2000
- Reseña de "Los estudios de empresarios y empresas, 2008
- Democracia, conocimiento y cultura, 2012
- INFORME DIRECCION IISUNAM, 2009-2013, 2013
- Trayectoria de Investigación de Rosalba Casas Guerrero: 1975-2013, 2014
- La transferencia de conocimiento en biotecnología: formación de redes a nivel local, 2014
- Formación de redes de conocimiento: una perspectiva regional desde México, 2015
