= Arthur Casas =

Brazilian architect

Arthur Casas Mattos is a Brazilian architect. He is best known for being the founder of Studio Arthur Casas, a studio focused on architecture.

== Biography ==
Casas graduated in Architecture and Urbanism at the Mackenzie Presbyterian University of São Paulo, 1983. He heads the Studio Arthur Casas, with offices in São Paulo and New York City. The architect, together with his team at the studio, work in almost all areas of an architectural project from the planning and implementation of constructions to interiors. From residential architecture to commercial and more recently, institutional, the design of the furniture establishes coherence between the space, objects and people. His interior architecture is stated to be known for its contrast between essential rationality and forms that are uniquely characteristic. Thus, his projects have become identifiable and recognizable in Brazil as well as people outside the country. His work has been referred to highlight his commitment to the environment, as he always looks to make use of innovative techniques and recycled materials. Due to the quality of his work, Casas is recognized as one of the "Top work by Brazil's leading architects".

== Awards ==
- Design award of the Museu da Casa Brasilieira in 1989;
- A&D Magazine in 1994
- Deca Award (Bathroom Project) in 1997
- Espaço D Magazine, 1st and 2nd Place in the categories of Interior Design, Commercial Spaces, Houses and Apartments almost every year between 1998 and 2006.
- 1st Place at the Best City Hotel, in the United States.
- Merit of Honour, at the 3rd Cauê de Arquitetura Prize and at the IAB Awards, with the Ornare Shop Project.
- 1st Place At the Museu da Casa Brasileira, in the sub category of Furniture
- Deca Prize for the “Um sonho de banheiro” or “Dream Bathroom”, 1st Place, in the Residential category.
- 20th Place at the Hall da Fame Awards, USA. (2006)
- Red Dot Design Award, a German Award, for the development of a line of cutlery and dining wear for Riva, and 1st place in the Beach Residence category for the award “the best of architecture” (2008)
- In 2009, at the “AIA/LA’s 5th annual Restaurant Design Awards”, he was among the finalists and won 1st place in the public school.
- 1st Place for “Best Restaurant”, at the “Design Award 2010” Awards by Wallpaper Magazine, with the project “Restaurante Kaa”. (2010)
- The best of Architecture Award, Arquitetura & Construção Magazine. (2011)
- Winner of national public competition "Campus Cabral University". (2012)
- Winner of national public competition of ideas for the revitalization of the Largos do Pelourinho", Salvador, Bahia. (2012)

Arthur Casas' Restaurante Kaa was not only a Wallpaper Magazine award winner in 2010, but the project is considered to be among the top works by Brazil´s leading architects which promotes his main works enough to be considered one of the biggest names in Architecture in the world. He has taken part in almost all issues of Casa Cor Magazine, São Paulo, between 1989 and 2003.

From 2003, Casas decided to approach his work from a different perspective, one that his profession permitted him to reach, and became an architect more and more connected with the environment and thinking in sustainability. Arthur Casas directs a studio of architecture in São Paulo which takes his own name, and due to its work on projects in the majority of cities in the world, it is regularly referred to in the main, specialized publications of the discipline such as the “e-architect".

== Biennals ==
Arthur Casas has participated in two Biennials of Architecture in São Paulo, 1997 and 2003 and at the Biennial of Buenos Aires in 2003, 2005 and 2007. In 2009, he lectured and gained an award at the XII Biennial of Buenos Aires.
