= Claudio José Casas =

Spanish cyclist

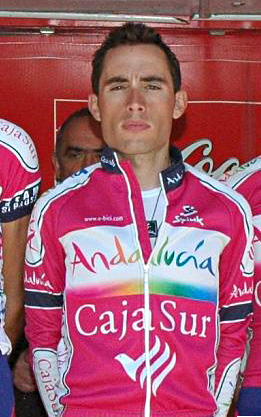

Personal information
- Born: 26 February 1982 (age 44) Teruel, Spain

Cycling career
- Sport: Cycling
- Current team: Retired
- Discipline: Road
- Role: Rider

Professional teams
- 2006: Comunidad Valenciana
- 2007–2008: Andalucía–CajaSur
- 2009: Contentpolis-Ampo

Claudio José Casas Gallego (born 26 February 1982 in Teruel) is a Spanish former professional road racing cyclist. He is the guitarist for the Spanish alternative metal band Dark Noise.
