= Julio Jesús de las Casas =

Venezuelan sports shooter (born 1945)

Personal information
- Nationality: Venezuelan
- Born: 12 April 1945 (age 79)

Sport
- Sport: Sports shooting

Julio Jesús de las Casas (born 12 April 1945) is a Venezuelan sports shooter. He competed at the 1980 Summer Olympics and the 1984 Summer Olympics.
