= Las Casas Occupational High School =

High school in Illinois, United States

Coordinates: 41°44′32.5″N 87°33′35.0″W

Location
- 8401 South Saginaw Avenue; Chicago, Illinois; United States

Information
- Closed: 2011
- School district: Chicago Public Schools
- NCES District ID: 1709930

Las Casas Occupational High School was an alternative high school located at 8401 South Saginaw Avenue in the South Chicago area of Chicago, Illinois, United States. The school, a part of Chicago Public Schools (CPS), intended to educate autistic, cognitively delayed, and behavior disordered students so they could take jobs.

By February 2009, CPS announced that the school would close because of building deficiencies and layout problems. The school was given a reprieve, and was eventually closed at the end of the 2010-11 school year.
