= Marta Estrada =

Spanish researcher (born 1946)

Marta Estrada i Miyares
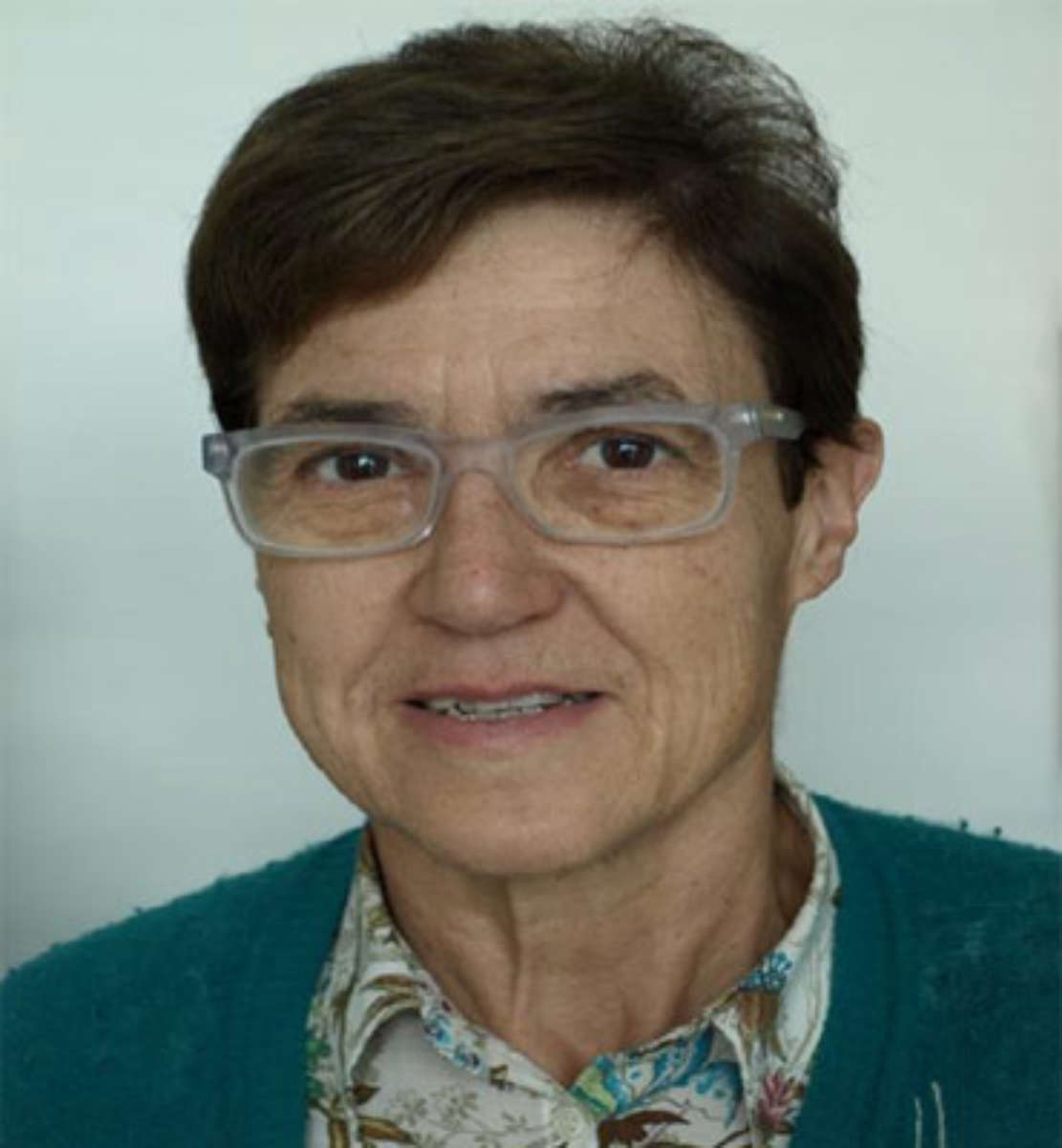
- Born: 1946 (age 79–80); Granollers, Catalonia, Spain
- Education: University of Barcelona
- Awards: Premi Extraordinari de Llicenciatura (1969); Premi Nacional Fi de Carrera (1969); Llaç de l'Orde Civil d'Alfons X el Savi (1969); Premi Extraordinari de Doctorat de la Universitat de Barcelona (1976); Premi Trégouboff (1992); Medalla Narcís Monturiol (1995); Premi Creu de Sant Jordi (2004)
- Scientific career
- Workplaces: Institute of Fishery Research Institute of Marine Sciences Royal Academy of Sciences and Arts of Barcelona Catalan Society of Biology
- Thesis: Study on populations of aquatic organisms in a non uniform medium
- Doctoral advisor: Ramon Margalef

Marta Estrada Miyares (born 1946) is a Catalan researcher, with a career in oceanography and marine biology. Her most prominent studies are based on the physiological characterization and ecological impact of algae and phytoplankton.

== Career ==
Marta Estrada's parents were both amateur archaeologists. She was born in Granollers, where she started her studies in the town's public elementary school. She later moved to Barcelona, where she followed her education in Institut Verdaguer. She graduated with Honours and a brilliant academic record both in Biological Sciences (1968) and Medicine and Surgery (1970) at the University of Barcelona. At the end of her bachelor's studies, in 1969, she was awarded with the Prize for the most outstanding graduate of her BSc degree, the National Graduation Award and the Llaç de l'Orde Civil d'Alfons X el Savi, a Spanish award for excellence in the education, science and research fields. Prior to that, in 1968, she received a scholarship to develop a doctoral thesis under the supervision of Ramon Margalef López and the Institute of Fishery Research (IIP), that she defended in 1976 under the title Studies of populations of aquatic organisms in a non uniform medium. As a result, she graduated as Doctor in Biology with a Prize for the most outstanding doctoral thesis from the University of Barcelona.

In parallel, at the end of the 60s, Estrada was part of the scientific team of the research vessel Cornide de Saavedra, which featured strongly in Spanish oceanographic research. Her roles included the control of the on-board computer, the characterization of chlorophyll and primary production, and recording temperature, salinity and nutrient data. In 1971, she obtained the position of Scientific Collaborator at the IIP (currently Institute of Marine Sciences, ICM-CSIC), which she took in 1972 after a six-month stay at the Woods Hole Oceanographic Institution and on board of the costa-rican research vessel Thompson. This research stay in the US allowed her to expand her doctoral thesis research thanks to a scholarship provided by the Institute of International Education .

In the mid 70s, Marta Estrada started her specialization in the ecology of phytoplankton and populations of harmful algae, from which she investigated mechanisms to control their bloom events. She participated in two outstanding oceanic programs from the US, the Coastal Upwelling Ecosystems Analysis (CUEA) and the Organization of Persistent Upwelling Structures (OPUS), and performed expeditions in Perú, Costa Rica, north-eastern Africa and California as a collaboration between researchers of the IIP and the University of Washington. During this time, she did extensive studies on phytoplankton's productivity and biomass, nitrate consumption and natural composition.

Later on, she advanced her research on phytoplankton and its interaction with the global marine ecosystem. She took part in multiple oceanographic expeditions in the Mediterranean Sea and the Atlantic, Arctic and Antarctic oceans. In 1984, she shared an expedition in the Antarctic Ocean with Josefina Castellví Piulachs on board the Argentinian Almirante Irizar, directed by Antoni Ballester Nolla. During this expedition, Marta Estrada and Josefina Castellví became the first Spanish to set foot on Antarctica. In the 80s, Estrada was designated chief of the department of Marine Biology and Oceanography at the Institute of Marine Sciences (ICM-CSIC), becoming the institute's director from 1995 to 1997.

Marta Estrada has published numerous works in specialised international journals, books and chapters in volumes about Oceanography. She has also participated in multiple international conferences and meetings, directed several PhD students and supervised many postdoctoral researchers. She has also taught lectures at the University of Barcelona, the University of Las Palmas de Gran Canaria and the Menéndez Pelayo International University.

== Awards ==
Together with the academic distinctions received as a BSc and PhD, Estrada received the Trégouboff Award from the Parisian Academy of Sciences. In 1995, the Generalitat de Catalunya awarded her with the Medalla Narcís Monturiol for the scientific and technological merits, and in 2004, she was awarded with the Creu de Sant Jordi. In 2017, the Barcelona city council awarded her with the Honours Medal, together with the lawyer and politician Magda Oranich and the singer José María Sanz Beltrán, Loquillo.

== Honours and institutional affiliations ==
Since 1996, she has been a member of the Catalan Society of Biology, becoming vicepresident and being distinguished as honorary member of the society in November 2016. She also became numerary member of the Biological Sciences Section of the Institute of Catalan Studies in 2011, giving a speech entitled Ecology of red tides. In December 1999 she was also named elected Academic of the Royal Academy of Arts and Sciences of Barcelona. In the entry celebration she gave a speech titled 'Hydrodynamics and phytoplankton of the Catalan sea'.

In 2016, the Granollers' High School was named after her, receiving the name IES Marta Estrada as a recognition of her scientific and technological merits.

Other associations and entities of which Marta Estrada is or has been a member and/or affiliated to include:

- ICES Advisory Committee on Marine Pollution (1989–1992)
- AD- ENA-WWF World Wildlife Foundation (1990–1992)
- Physiological Ecology of Harmful Algal Blooms (1992–1998)
- Scientific and Steering Committee (1998–2000) del programa internacional Global Ecology and Oceanography of Harmful Algal Blooms (GEOHAB) de la UNESCO (SCOR/IOC-UNESCO)
- Working Group 97 del Special Committee on Oceanic Research (SCOR) del International Council for Science (ICSU)
- Several teams of experts about climate change in Catalonia
- Jury of the Ramon Margalef Prize in Ecology
- Centre Excursionista de Catalunya

== Selection of research publications ==
Selected works:

- Marta Estrada. 2011. Ecologia de les marees roges: discurs de recepció de Marta Estrada i Miyares com a membre numerària de la Secció de Ciències Biològiques. Editor Institut d'Estudis Catalans, Secció de Ciències Biològiques, 35 pp. ISBN 84-9965-067-8, ISBN 9788499650678
- Clara Llebot, Yvette H. Spitz, Jordi Solé, Marta Estrada. 2010. The role of organic nutrients and dissolved organic phosphorus in the phytoplankton dynamics of a mediterranean bay. A modeling study. Journal of Marine Systems 83: 192–209. doi:10.1016/j.jmarsys.2010.06.009
- Jordi Solé, Antonio Turiel, Marta Estrada, Clara Llebot, Dolors Blasco, Jordi Camp, Maximino Delgado, Margarita Fernández-Tejedor, Jorge Diogène. 2009. Climatic forcing on hydrography of a Mediterranean bay (Alfacs Bay). Continental Shelf Res. 29 (200): 1786–1800. doi:10.1016/j.csr.2009.04.012
- Marta Estrada, Peter Henriksen, Josep M. Gasol, Emilio O. Casamayor, Carlos Pedrós-Alió. 2004. Diversity of planktonic photoautotrophic microorganisms along a salinity gradient as depicted by microscopy, flow cytometry, pigment analysis and DNA-based methods. FEMS Microbiology Ecology 49: 281–283. doi:10.1016/j.femsec.2004.04.002
- Marta Estrada. 2004. El Dr. Ramón Margalef y la oceanografía. Colaboró Sociedad Española de Ficología. 2 pp.
- Marta Estrada, Elisa Berdalet, Magda Vila, Cèlia Marrasé. 2003. Effects of pulsed nutrient enrichment on enclosed phytoplankton: ecophysiological and successional responses. Aquatic Microbial Ecology, 32: 81–71. doi:10.3354/ame032061
- Marta Estrada, Ramiro A. Varela, Jordi Slat, Antoni Cruzado, Enric Arias. 1999. Spatio-temporal variability of the winter phytoplankton distribution across the Catalan and North Balearic fronts (NW Mediterranean). Journal of Plankton Research, 21: 1-20. doi:10.1093/plankt/21.1.1
- Marta Estrada, Elisa Berdalet. 1998. Effects of turbulence on phytoplankton. D.M. Anderson, A.D. Cambells, G.M Hallegraeff (eds.). Physiological ecology of harmful algal blooms. NATO-ASI Series, vol. G41, Springer Verlag, Berlin, pp. 601–618.
- Marta Estrada. 1995. Dinoflagellate assemblages in the Iberian upwelling area. En: Lassus, P., Arzul, G., Erard, E., Gentien, P., Marcaillou, C. (eds.): Harmful marine algal blooms. Technique et Documentation. Lavoisier, Intercept Ltd. Cachan, pp: 157–162.
- Marta Estrada. 1995. El fitoplancton antártico. Vol. 167 de Informes técnicos de Scientia Marina. Editor Instituto de Ciencias del Mar (CSIC), 15 pp.
- Marta Estrada. 1986. Mareas rojas. Vol. 132 de Informes técnicos del Instituto de Investigaciones Pesqueras. Editor Centro Nacional de Ciencias del Mar, 16 pp.
- Marta Estrada. 1978. Estudios sobre poblaciones de organismos acuáticos en medio no uniforme. Editor Universidad, Secretariado de Publicaciones, Intercambio Científico y Extensión Universitaria, 28 pp.
