= Dianne de Las Casas =

Dianne de Las Casas (January 15, 1970 – August 21, 2017) was a Philippine-born American author and storyteller who toured internationally. She was the founder of an international initiative designating November as Picture Book Month.

== Awards ==
- Storytelling World Resource Award (2005, 2010, 2011)
- National Parenting Publications Award (2006)

== Bibliography ==
=== Children's books ===
- The Cajun Cornbread Boy (2009)
- Madame Poulet and Monsieur Roach (2009)
- Mama's Bayou (2010)
- The Gigantic Sweet Potato (2010)
- There's a Dragon in the Library (2011)
- The House That Witchy Built (2011)
- Blue Frog: The Legend of Chocolate (2011)
- Beware, Beware of the Big Bad Bear (2012)
- Dinosaur Mardi Gras (2012)
- The Little "Read" Hen (2013)

=== Other books ===
- Story Fest: Crafting Story Theater Scripts (2005)
- Kamishibai Story Theater: The Art of Picture Telling (2006)
- Handmade Tales: Stories to Make and Take (2008)
- The Story Biz Handbook: How to Manage Your Storytelling Career from the Desk to the Stage (2008)
- Tangram Tales: Story Theater Using the Ancient Chinese Puzzle (2009)
- Scared Silly: 25 Tales to Tickle and Thrill (2009)
- Stories on Board: Creating Board Games from Favorite Tales (2010)
- A Is for Alligator: Draw and Tell Tales from A-Z (2011)
- Tell Along Tales! Playing with Participation Stories (2011)
- Tales from the 7,000 Isles: Filipino Folk Stories (2011)
- Handmade Tales 2: More Stories to Make and Take (2013)
