= Mireia Casas =

Spanish windsurfer

Personal information
- Birth name: Mireia Casas Albiach
- Nationality: Spanish
- Born: 16 April 1969; Barcelona, Spain
- Died: 8 September 2002 (aged 33)
- Height: 162 cm (5 ft 4 in)
- Weight: 57 kg (126 lb; 9 st 0 lb)

Sport
- Sport: Windsurfing

Mireia Casas Albiach (16 April 1969 – 8 September 2002) was a Spanish windsurfer. She competed at the 1992 Summer Olympics and 1996 Summer Olympics.
