= Creu Casas =

Catalan botanist, bryologist and professor (1913-2007)

Creu Casas i Sicart
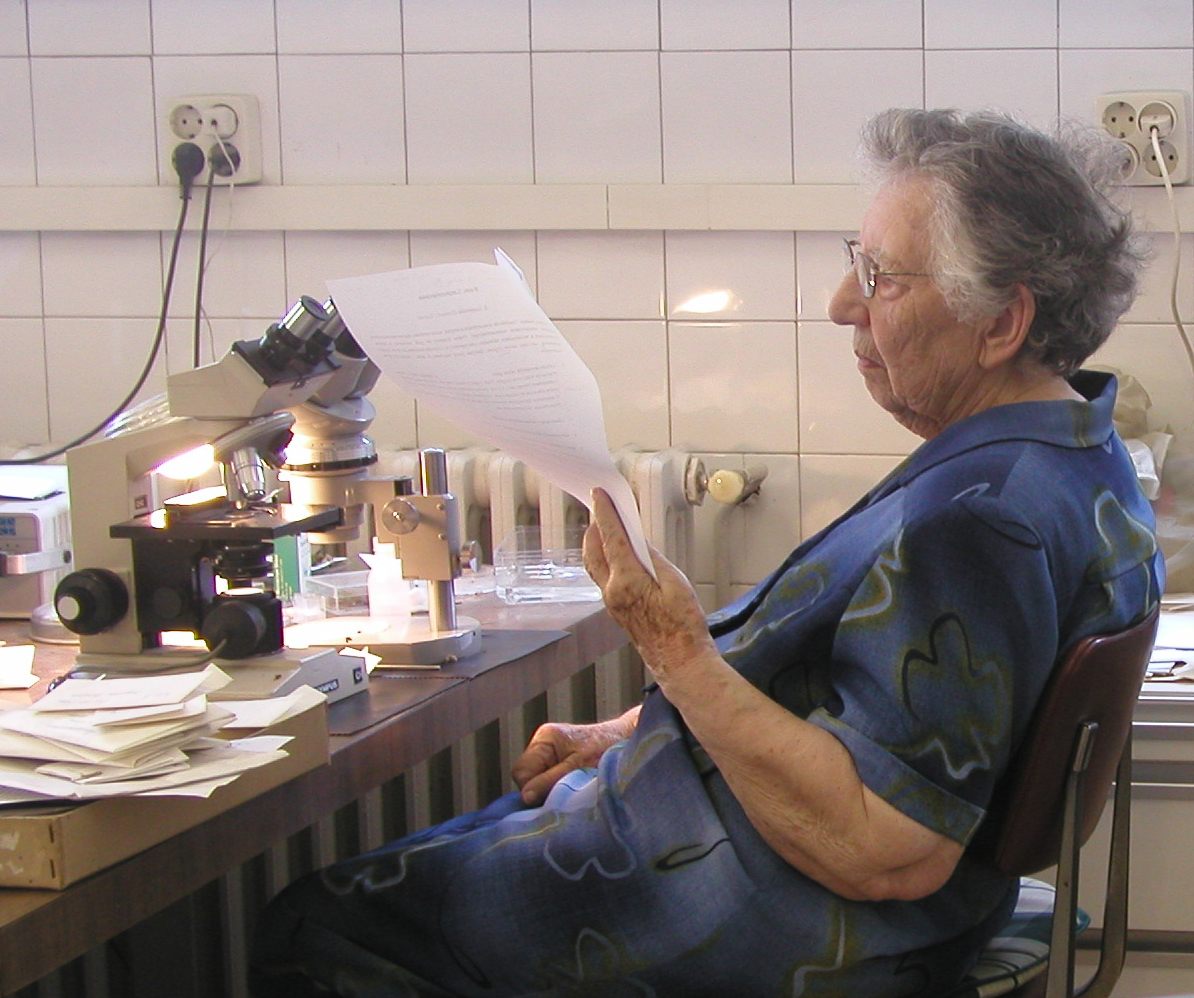
- Born: 26 April 1913; La Clota, Catalonia, Spain
- Died: 20 May 2007 (aged 94)
- Occupation: Pharmacist; Professor; Bryologist
- Employer: University of Barcelona; Autonomous University of Barcelona
- Awards: Narcís Monturiol Medal (1983); National Research Award- Catalonia (2002)
- Position held: professor (1971–)

Creu Casas i Sicart (Barcelona, April 26, 1913 – Barcelona, May 20, 2007) was a Catalan biologist and botanist. After graduating from the University of Barcelona, she became a bryology specialist and started a large inventory of Catalan and European bryophytes. She wrote two important books on this subject: Flora dels Briòfits dels Països Catalans (vol. I, 2001; vol. II, 2004) and Handbook of mosses of the Iberian Peninsula and the Balearic Islands (2006).

== Early life ==
Creu Casas was born into a humble family in Barcelona on 5 May 1913. Her father, a gardener, started working for the philanthropist and book enthusiast Rafael Patxot around 1917, in a section of the house where their family later resided. Responsible for tending to Patxot's gardens, including one situated on Montseny mountain, her father immersed her in a milieu of gardens, gardeners, and cultured visitors, fostering Creu's budding fascination with the botanical realm.

== Education ==
She pursued a degree in Pharmacy thanks to a well-known patron and entrepreneur, Rafael Patxot, who went into exile in Switzerland during the Spanish Civil War.

She began her studies in Pharmacy in 1931 at the University of Barcelona. One of her professors was the eminent botanist Pius Font i Quer, who strengthened her passion for the world of plants. She completed her studies in 1936, although three years later she had to revalidate her degree, which the Franco regime annulled.

== Work ==
From 1937 onwards, she worked as a pharmacist. After the war, she managed the pharmacy of the "Quinta de Salut la Aliança," while still maintaining contact with botanists and plants. She worked there for 27 years.

Her dedication to bryology began very early, under the guidance of Professor P. Seró. In 1947, she would start working in the Botany laboratory of the Faculty of Pharmacy of Barcelona, where Taurino Mariano Losa España was a professor. In 1949, she obtained the position of "Interim Associate" in Phanerogamy at the same faculty. In 1951, Casas defended her doctoral thesis on the bryophytes from Montseny.

In 1967, she was appointed as a professor of Phytogeography at the Faculty of Biology of the University of Barcelona. In 1971, she obtained the chair of Botany at the Autonomous University of Barcelona. After her retirement, she was named Professor Emerita in 1983. From that moment on, she devoted with even greater passion to the study of bryophytes. In 1989, she founded the Spanish Bryology Society, of which she was the first president.

== Scientific contributions ==
Her contribution to bryology is summarized in 216 published works, particularly in the fields of taxonomy and floristics. She explored with some regularity the Montseny, the Garraf massif, the Pyrenees, the Balearic Islands, Monegros, and different peninsular areas, such as Sierra Nevada, the Iberian System, the Central System, different Portuguese massifs, among others.

As a culmination of her career, she consolidated her knowledge into two synthesis works, Flora dels Briòfits dels Països Catalans (vol. I, 2001; vol. II, 2004), and Handbook of Mosses of the Iberian Peninsula and the Balearic Islands (2006).

In 1983, she was honored with the Narcís Monturiol Medal for Scientific and Technological Merit, and in 2002, she received the Fundació Catalana Prize for Research and the Serra d’Or Critical Prize for her research on the bryophytic flora of the Catalan Countries.
