= Premi d'Honor de les Lletres Catalanes =

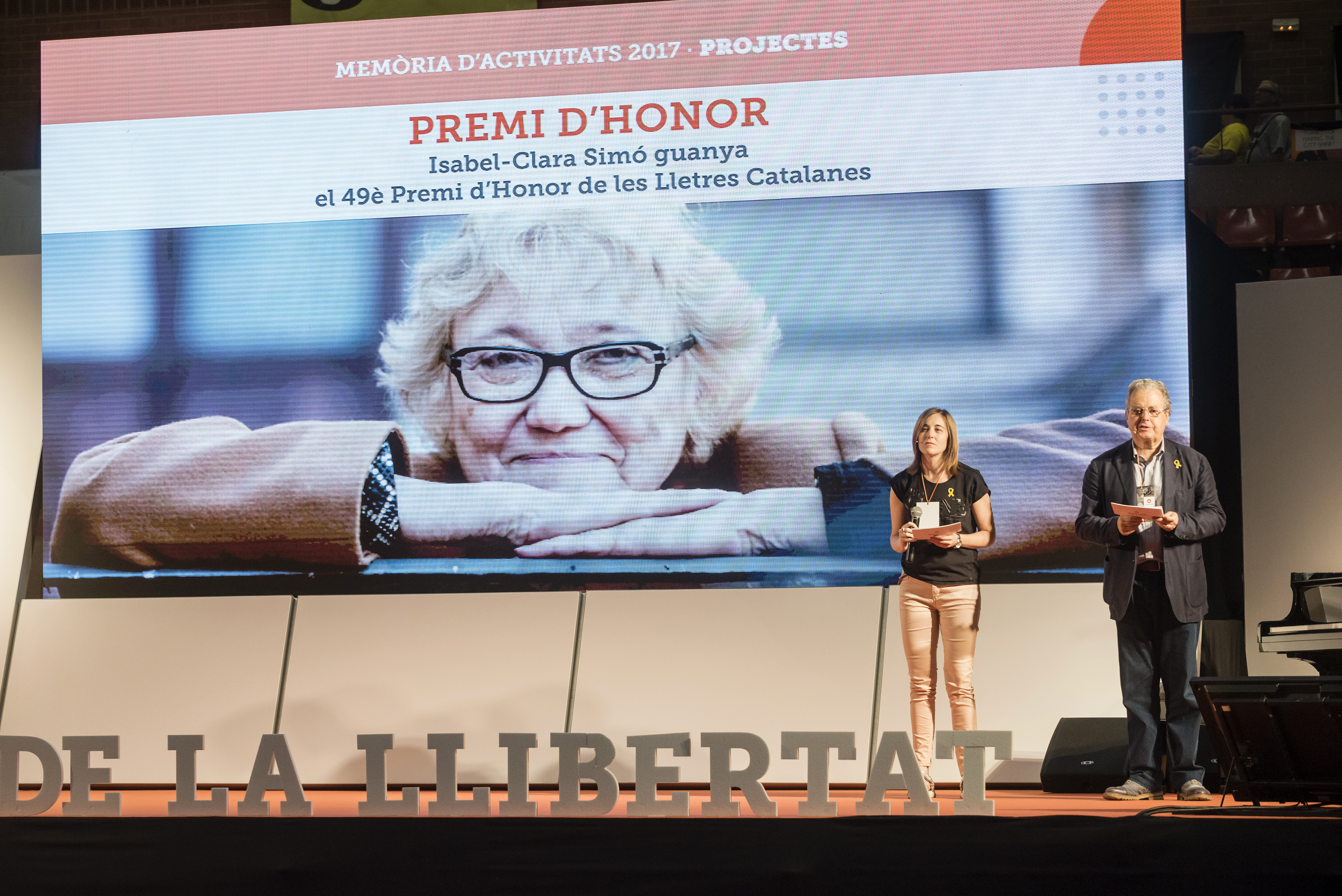
2018 Òmnium Cultural general assembly

The Premi d'Honor de les Lletres Catalanes (Catalan Literary Lifetime Achievement Award) is an award instituted by Omnium Cultural since 1969 to recognize a person by their scientific or literary work, written in Catalan language, the importance of their work and his/her significant contribution to cultural life of the Catalan Countries.

The prize is awarded annually, with 30,000 Euro and it can't be shared between different people or declared void. The jury consists of nine broad-intellectual and is renewed by thirds every two years on a proposal from the board and the advisory bodies of Omnium Cultural.

The ceremony of the Catalan Letters Lifetime Achievement Award takes place in June in the Palau de la Música Catalana in Barcelona, with the presence of people from the cultural, political and social areas of the country.

== List of awarded people ==
- 1969 – Jordi Rubió i Balaguer. Historian and Bibliologist. Barcelona, 1887 – 1982.
- 1970 – Joan Oliver i Sallarès (Pere Quart). Poet and Playwright. Sabadell, 1899 – Barcelona, 1986.
- 1971 – Francesc de Borja Moll i Casasnovas. Linguist and Editor. Ciutadella 1903 – Palma, 1991.
- 1972 – Salvador Espriu i Castelló. Poet, Playwright and Writer. Santa Coloma de Farners, 1913 – Barcelona, 1985.
- 1973 – Josep Vicenç Foix i Mas. Poet, Writer and journalist. Sarrià, Barcelona 1893 – Barcelona, 1986.
- 1974 – Manuel Sanchis i Guarner. Linguist and Historian. València, 1911 – 1981.
- 1975 – Joan Fuster i Ortells. Essayist and Poet. Sueca, 1922 – 1992.
- 1976 – Pau Vila i Dinarès. Geografher and educator. Sabadell, 1881 – Barcelona, 1980.
- 1977 – Miquel Tarradell i Mateu. Archaeologist and Historian. Barcelona, 1920 – 1995.
- 1978 – Vicent Andrés Estellés. Poet, Writer and Journalist. Burjassot, 1924 – València, 1993.
- 1979 – Manuel de Pedrolo i Molina. Writer. L’Aranyó, 1918 – Barcelona, 1990.
- 1980 – Mercè Rodoreda i Gurguí. Writer, Playwright and Poet. Barcelona, 1908 – Girona, 1983.
- 1981 – Josep Maria de Casacuberta i Roger. Publisher, Linguist and Historian. Barcelona, 1897 – 1985.
- 1982 – Josep M. Llompart i de la Peña. Poet, Essayist and Translator. Palma, 1925 – 1993.
- 1983 – Ramon Aramon i Serra. Linguist. Barcelona, 1907 – 2000.
- 1984 – Joan Coromines i Vigneaux. Linguist. Barcelona, 1905 – Pineda de Mar, 1997.
- 1985 – Marià Manent i Cisa. Poet, Writer, Literary critic and Translator. Barcelona, 1898 – 1988.
- 1986 – Pere Calders i Rossinyol. Writer and Drawer. Barcelona, 1912 – 1994.
- 1987 – Enric Valor i Vives. Linguist and Writer. Castalla, 1911 – València, 2000.
- 1988 – Xavier Benguerel i Llobet. Poet, Playwright, Writer and Translator. Barcelona, 1905 – 1990.
- 1989 – Marià Villangómez i Llobet. Poet and Translator. Ciutat d’Eivissa, 1913 – 2002.
- 1990 – Miquel Batllori i Munné. Historian. Barcelona, 1909 – 2003.
- 1991 – Miquel Martí i Pol. Poet and Translator. Roda de Ter, 1929 – 2003.
- 1992 – Joan Triadú i Font. Educator, Poet and Literary critic. Ribes de Freser, 1921 – Barcelona, 2010.
- 1993 – Tomàs Garcés i Miravet. Poet. Barcelona, 1901 – 1993.
- 1994 – Jordi Sarsanedas i Vives. Poet and Writer. Barcelona, 1924 – 2006.
- 1995 – Antoni Cayrol (Jordi-Pere Cerdà). Poet, Writer and Playwright. Sallagosa, 1920 – Perpinyà, 2011.
- 1996 – Josep Benet i Morell. Historian and Publisher. Cervera, 1920 – Sant Cugat del Vallès, 2008.
- 1997 – Avel·lí Artís i Gener (Tísner). Journalist and Writer. Barcelona, 1912 – 2000.
- 1998 – Joaquim Molas i Batllori. Historian and Literary critic. Barcelona, 1930 – 2015.
- 1999 – Josep Palau i Fabre. Poet, Writer and Art critic. Barcelona, 1917 – 2008.
- 2000 – Josep Vallverdú i Aixalà. Writer, Poet, Playwright, Linguist and Educator. Lleida, 1923.
- 2001 – Teresa Pàmies i Bertran. Writer. Balaguer, 1919 – Granada, 2012.
- 2002 – Josep Maria Espinàs i Massip. Writer, Journalist and Publisher. Barcelona, 1927.
- 2003 – Antoni Maria Badia i Margarit. Linguist. Barcelona, 1920 – 2014.
- 2004 – Joan Francesc Mira i Casterà. Writer, Translator, Anthropologist and Sociologist. València, 1939.
- 2005 – Feliu Formosa i Torres. Poet, Translator and Playwright. Sabadell, 1934.
- 2006 – Josep Termes i Ardèvol. Historian. Barcelona, 1936 – Barcelona, 2011.
- 2007 – Baltasar Porcel i Pujol. Writer, Playwright, Journalist and Literary critic. Andratx, 1937 – Barcelona, 2009.
- 2008 – Montserrat Abelló i Soler. Poet and Translator. Tarragona, 1918 – Barcelona, 2014.
- 2009 – Joan Solà i Cortassa. Linguist. Bell-lloc d'Urgell, 1940 – Barcelona, 2010.
- 2010 – Jaume Cabré i Fabré. Writer, Screenwriter and Playwright. Barcelona, 1947.
- 2011 – Albert Manent i Segimon. Philologist, Historian and Writer. Premià de Dalt, 1930 – Barcelona, 2014.
- 2012 – Josep Massot i Muntaner. Philologist, Historian and Publisher. Palma de Mallorca, 1941.
- 2013 – Josep Maria Benet i Jornet. Playwright and Screenwriter. Barcelona, 1940 – Lleida, 2020.
- 2014 – Ramon Pelegero i Sanchis (Raimon). Poet and Singer. Xàtiva, 1940.
- 2015 – Joan Veny i Clar. Linguist and Dialectologist. Campos (Majorca), 1932.
- 2016 – Maria Antònia Oliver i Cabrer. Writer and Translator. Manacor, 1946.
- 2017 – Isabel-Clara Simó. Writer, Playwright and Journalist. Alcoi, 1943 – Barcelona, 2020.
- 2018 – Quim Monzó. Writer. Barcelona, 1952.
- 2019 – Marta Pessarrodona. Writer and Translator. Terrassa, 1941.
- 2020 – Enric Casasses. Poet. Barcelona, 1951.
- 2021 – Maria Barbal. Writer. Tremp, 1949.
- 2022 – Antònia Vicens. Writer. Santanyí, 1941
