= Miquel Tarradell =

Spanish archaeologist and prehistorian

- Born: November 24, 1920; Barcelona, Spain
- Died: January 1, 1995 (aged 74); Barcelona, Spain
- Occupations: Historian, archaeologist and professor
- Employer(s): University of Barcelona; University of Valencia

Miquel Tarradell (1920 in Barcelona, Spain – 1995 in Barcelona, Spain) was an archaeologist and prehistorian, specialist in the Punic, Iberian and Roman world.

== Biography ==
Miquel Tarradell was first an archaeologist in Spanish Morocco, where he delved into the ancient history of Mauritania Tingitana, both in Roman and Punic times, and then went on to teach in Spain, focusing thereafter on archaeological topics in Spain.

In 1950 he published El Periplo de Hannon y los lixitas, in Mauritania, no. 268. As an archaeologist he excavated in the city of Lixus, publishing in 1959, Lixus: historia de la ciudad, guía de las ruinas y de la sección de Lixus del Museo Arqueológico de Tetuán. In 1960 he published the Punic Morocco and in 1962 with Luis Pericot Garcia) published a Manual of African prehistory. He was also interested in the Roman city of Tamuda, which was excavated between 1949 and 1955, publishing an overview of the excavation in 1956.

During his stay in Morocco he served as director of the Service of Archaeology of the protectorate, where organized and published the First Archaeological Congress of Spanish Morocco in Tetouan in 1953.

He was a disciple of Francesc Soldevila, Jordi Rubió and Pere Bohigas at the Catalan University Studies. He was one of the founders in 1946 of the clandestine magazine of Catalan culture Ariel.

He directed the Archaeological Research Service of Granada and the Archaeological Service of the Spanish protectorate in Morocco. During this period, he carried out excavations in the Roman site of Lixus. He was Professor of Archaeology at the Universities of Valencia in 1956, where he created the journal Papeles del Laboratorio de Arqueología de Valencia. In Barcelona, he was Professor of Archaeology, Epigraphy and Numismatics, since 1970.

During his stay in Valencia, he worked in the Roman and Iberian sites of the Valencian Community, together with other university archaeologists such as Luis Pericot, Enric A. Llobretat and Gabriela Martín Ávila, and collaborated with the SIP together with Domingo Fletcher and Enrique Pla. Very committed to the recovery of democratic freedoms and Catalan culture, he supported the singer Raimon from the very beginning. He was awarded the Premi d'Honor de les Lletres Catalanes in 1977. He was also a member of the Standing Committee of the International Association of Prehistoric Sciences and advisor to the Council of Archaeology of the Generalitat de Catalunya and director of the history magazine in Catalan Fonaments.

He was a member of the Reial Acadèmia de Bones Lletres de Barcelona, on the Board of Trustees of the new Revista de Catalunya, and of the Associació d'Escriptors en Llengua Catalana.

== Legacy ==
During a tribute he received on August 22, 1991, Joan Francesc Mira stated that one of the conclusions of his work was that the geographical framework of the Catalan Countries already had a defined historical personality before the arrival of Rome. In the same act Jordi Carbonell affirmed that he was a forger of ideology and put him on a par with other personalities of pan-Catalanist nationalism such as Manuel de Pedrolo, Alexandre Cirici, Joan Fuster or Joan Triadú.

As a tribute, a secondary school in the neighborhood of El Raval in Barcelona (IES Miquel Tarradell) was dedicated to him.

== Personal life ==
In 1952, he married Matilde Font Sariols, who he had met while studying and she became a collaborator in all his research.
