= Josep Massot =

Spanish historian, Roman Catholic monk and philologist (1941–2022)

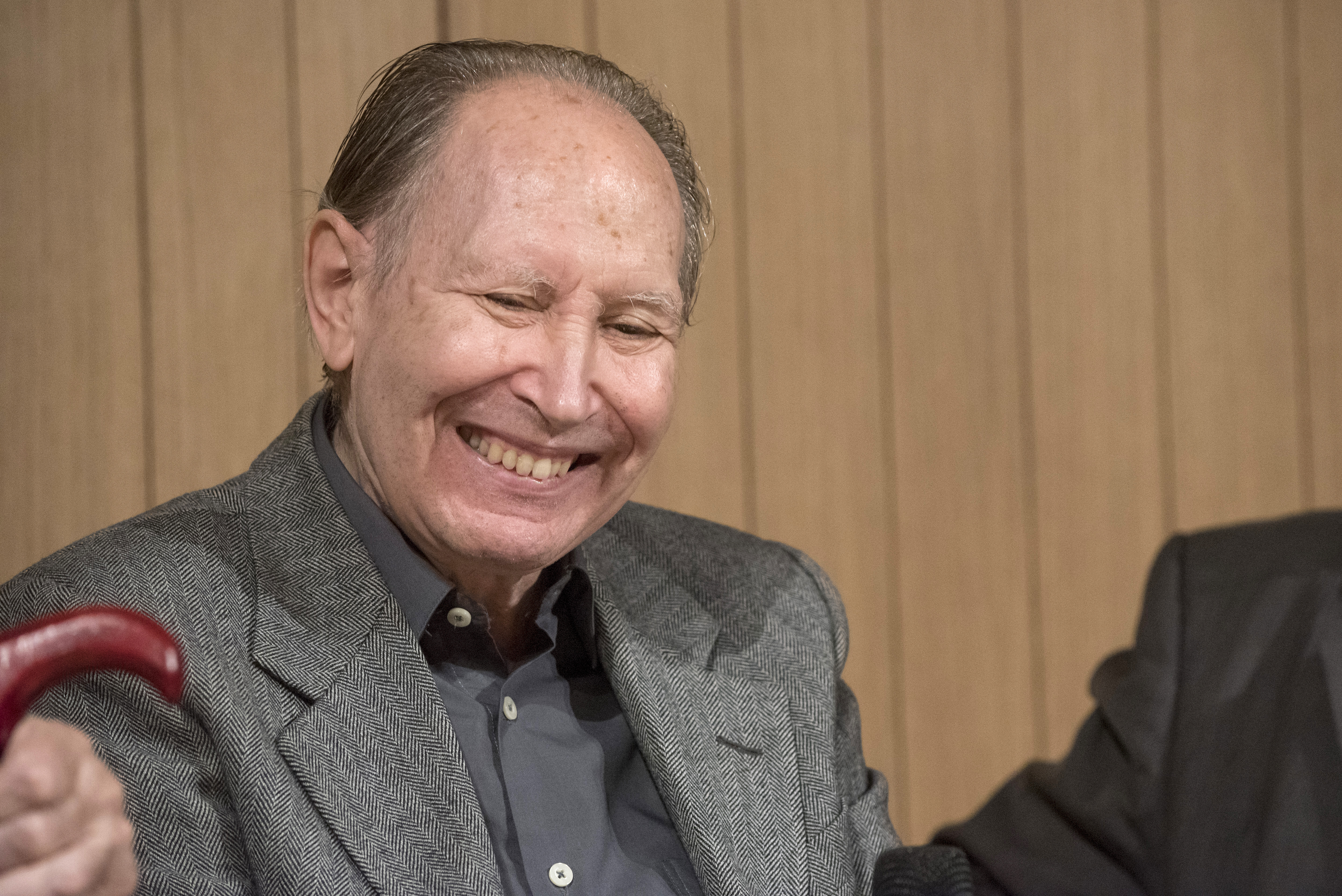
- Massot in 2018
- Born: Josep Massot i Muntaner; 3 November 1941; Palma de Mallorca, Spain
- Died: 24 April 2022 (aged 80)
- Education: University of Barcelona
- Occupations: Historian, Roman Catholic monk, philologist

Josep Massot i Muntaner (3 November 1941 – 24 April 2022) was a Spanish historian, Roman Catholic monk and philologist.

== Life and career ==
Massot was born in Palma de Mallorca. He studied Romance philology at the University of Barcelona with literary historian Martí de Riquer i Morera and Joan Petit. Massot graduated from the University of Barcelona in 1963.

Massot attended the Catalan University Studies of the Institute for Catalan Studies. He worked as a teacher at the University of Barcelona from 1970 to 1983, and was then appointed secretary of the International Association of Catalan Language and Literature. Massot was also the director of the Diccionari de Literatura Catalana from 1977 to 1979.

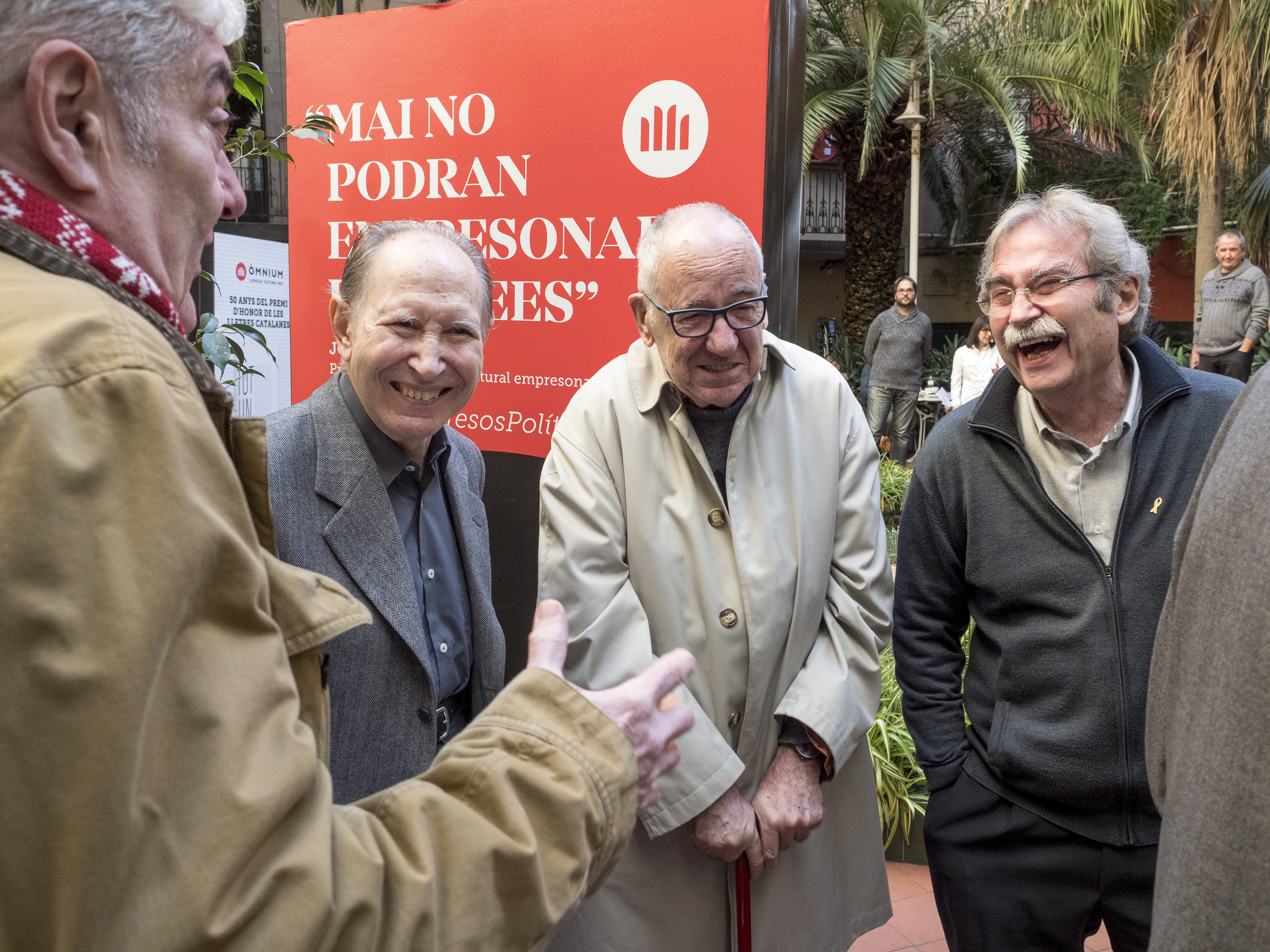
Massot with Feliu Formosa and Jaume Cabré in 2018

Massot entered the Benedictines of the Santa Maria de Montserrat Abbey in 1962, and was ordained as a priest in 1972. He was the director of Publications for the Abbey of Montserrat. He was the curator of a collection of popular songs of Catalonia. He won the Francesc de Borja Moll i Casasnovas prize, and was awarded honorary doctorates by the University of the Balearic Islands and the University of Valencia.

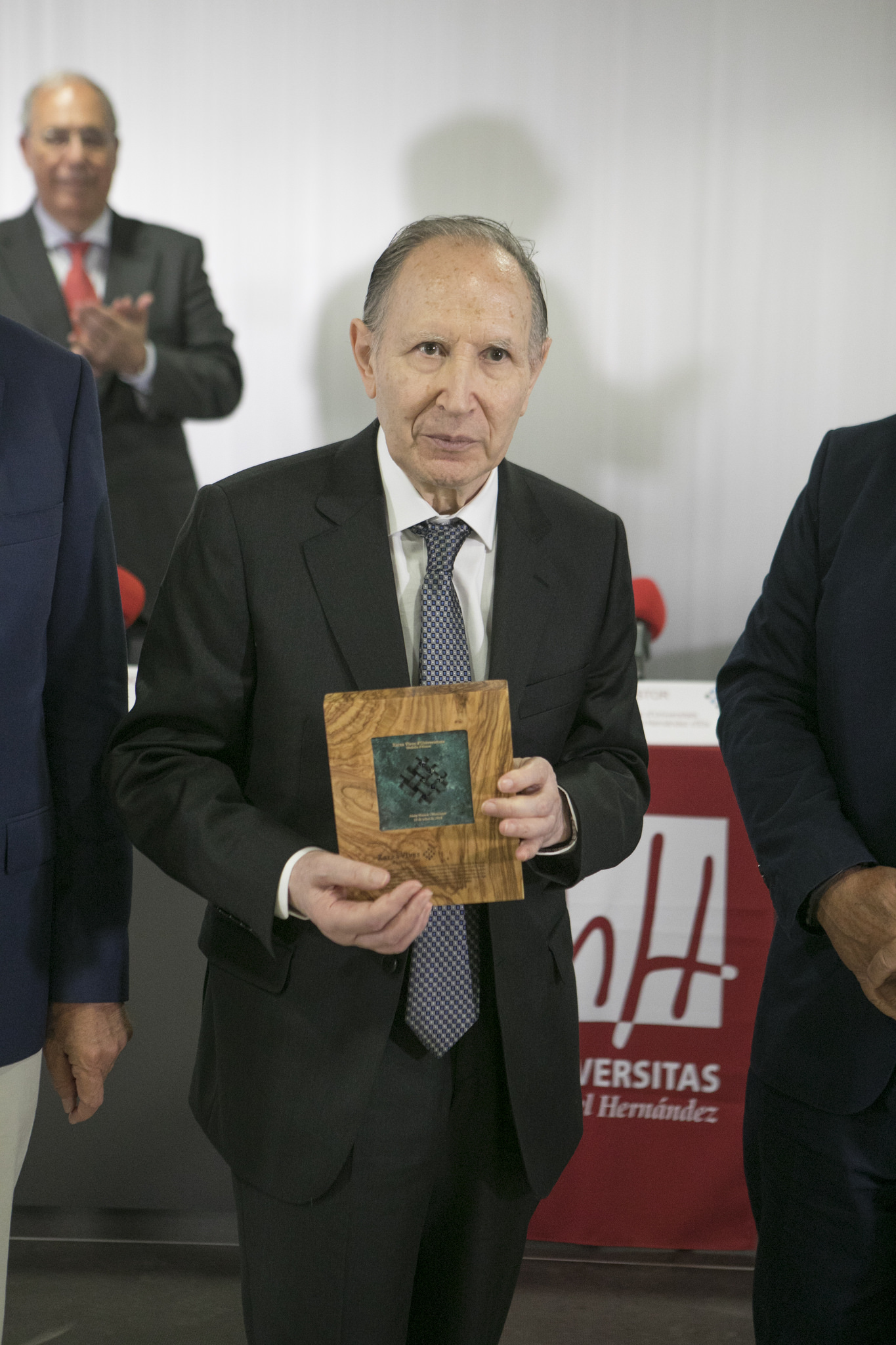
Massot with the Medal of Honor of the Xarxa Vives d'Universitats in 2018

Massot served as a member of the Reial Acadèmia de Bones Lletres de Barcelona from 2002. He was awarded the National Prize for Popular Culture by the Generalitat de Catalunya in 1997. Massot was also honored with the Premi d'Honor de les Lletres Catalanes in 2012. In 2018, he was the honored with the Medal of Honor of the Xarxa Vive d'Universitats from the Xarxa Vives d'Universitats. In 2019, Massot was honored with the Gold Medal of the Autonomous Community of the Balearic Islands. He was also honored with the Creu de Sant Jordi.

== Death ==
Massot died on 24 April 2022, at the age of 80.
