= Montserrat Abelló i Soler =

Catalan poet and translator

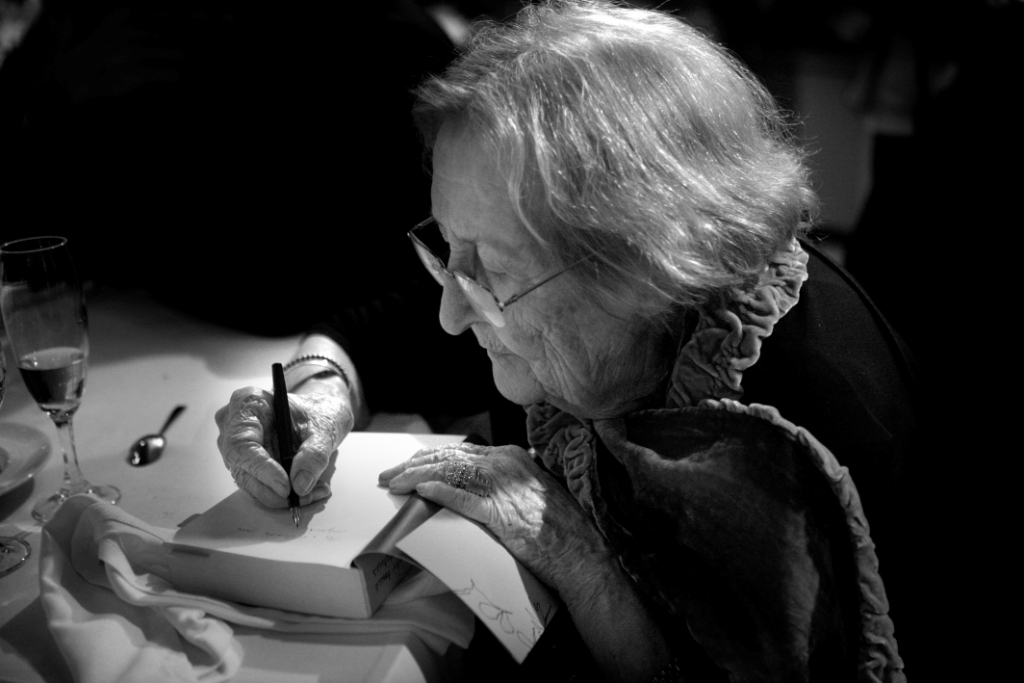
- Montserrat Abelló
- Born: Montserrat Abelló i Soler; 1 February 1918; Tarragona
- Died: 9 September 2014 (aged 96); Barcelona
- Occupations: Poet, translator
- Years active: 1963–2014

Montserrat Abelló i Soler (1 February 1918 – 9 September 2014) was a Catalan poet and translator. During the Spanish Civil War, she lived in exile in France, England and Chile.

== Translations ==
=== English to Catalan ===
A graduate in English philology, Abelló i Soler has produced a number of notable translations into Catalan of English writers and poets including:

- Sylvia Plath
- Dylan Thomas
- E.M. Forster
- Iris Murdoch
- Mohsen Emadi

=== Catalan to English ===
Abelló i Soler has also produced translations from Catalan to English of writers including:

- Salvador Espriu
- Mercè Rodoreda
- Maria Àngels Anglada
- Maria Mercè Marçal
- Olga Xirinacs Díaz

== Written works ==
Abelló i Soler has also written a number of books of poetry:

- Vida diària ("Daily life") (1963)
- Vida diària: Paraules no dites ("Daily Life: Words not said") (1981)
- El blat del temps ("The Wheat of Time") (1986)
- Foc a les mans ("Fire in Hand") (1990)
- L’arrel de l’aigua ("The Root of Water") (1995)
- Son màscares que m’emprovo ("Masks of Sleep that I Try") (1995)
- Dins l’esfera del temps ("In the Sphere of Time") (1998) which won the Gold Critica Serra prize in 1999.
- Asseguda escrivint ("Seated Writing") (2004)
- Memoria de tu i de mi ("Memories of You and Me") (2006)

In 2002, her poetry was compiled in Al cor de les paraules: obra poètica 1963-2002 ("In the Heart of Words: Poetic Works 1963-2002"), which in 2003 won several Catalan literary prizes.

She has also contributed to anthologies of writing and poetry:

- Cares a la finestra: 20 dones poetes de parla anglesa del segle XX ("Faces in the Window: 20 English Women Poets of the 20th century") (1993)
- Cartografies del desig: Quinze escriptores i el seu món ("Cartography of Desire: Fifteen writers and their world") (1998)
- Memoria de l’aigua: Onze escriptores i el seu món ("Memories of Water: Eleven writers and their world") (1999)
- Paisatge emergent ("Emergent Landscape") (1999).

== Awards ==
- "Creu de Sant Jordi" (the Cross of Saint George) for her work as a translator (1998).
- "Premi d'Honor de les Lletres Catalanes" (Catalan Letters Lifetime Achievement Award) (2008).

== Sources ==
- Diccionari de la Literatura Catalana, 2008
