= Núria Albó =

Spanish writer, teacher, and politician (born 1930)

Núria Albó i Corrons (born 2 July 1930) is a Spanish writer, teacher, and politician. She is a Creu de Sant Jordi and Premi Vila d'Arenys laureate.

== Early life ==
Albó was born on 2 July 1930 in La Garriga near Barcelona. Her father was killed on 18 September 1936 during the Spanish Civil War. She was not able to have a normal education because of the war, but her mother created home schooling for Albó and her four siblings. Albó's love of music was supported by her mother, who arranged for her to learn the piano.

Albó supplemented her education by reading novels by Hans Christian Andersen and those illustrated by the Spanish Lola Anglada and the English Arthur Rackham. Even as a child, she tried to read books that were written in the language Catalan and this partnered her first experiments with writing.

== Career ==
She began her studies in philosophy at the University of Barcelona, in 1948, but left before finishing. She returned later and received a degree in pedagogy in 1962. She won her first literary prize in 1958. In 1962 she published a poetry collection with La mà pel front, releasing another ten years later entitled Díptic with Maria Àngels Anglada, with a foreword by Marià Manent and illustrations by Ricard Creus.

A teacher for 20 years, she was elected mayor of La Garriga in 1979. Her 1980 novel, Desencis ("Disillusion") was awarded the Premi Vila de'Arenys. A political novel set during elections, her characters are described as "contradictory" and "tender, intelligent and sometimes lucid, but at the same time conformist and passive." She is a contemporary of Maria Àngels Anglada, Maria Aurèlia Capmany, Clementina Arderiu, Rosa Leveroni, and Maria Beneyto.

== Personal life ==
Albó is married to Guillermo Serra with whom she has four children, Mireia, Guillem, Oriol, and Judit. She received the Creu de Sant Jordi Award in 2012.

== Selected works ==
=== Poems ===
- La mà pel front (1962)
- Díptic, (1972) with Maria Àngels Anglada.
- L’encenedor verd, (1979)

=== Children's books ===
- El fantasma Santiago (1979)

=== Novels ===
- Fes-te repicar (1979)
- Agapi mou (1980)
- Desencís (1980)
- Tranquil, Jordi, tranquil (1983)
- Grills (1983)

== Bibliography ==
- Abadal, Maria Àngels Anglada (7 June 2012). El violí d'Auschwitz (in Catalan). Educaula. ISBN 978-84-15192-45-9.
- Bleiberg, Germán; Ihrie, Maureen; Pérez, Janet (1 January 1993). Dictionary of the Literature of the Iberian Peninsula. Greenwood Publishing Group. ISBN 978-0-313-28731-2.
- Permanyer, Mariona Ferran i (1 January 1997). L'Escola Isabel de Villena i la seva gent (1939–1989): mig segle d'acció escolar catalana (in Catalan). L'Abadia de Montserrat. ISBN 978-84-7826-820-7.
- Who's Who in Spain (1988). Who's who in Spain. Who's Who in Spain. ISBN 9788440421067.
