= CIC Cultural Institution =

Catalan educational institute

- Institució Cultural del Centre d'Influència Catòlica
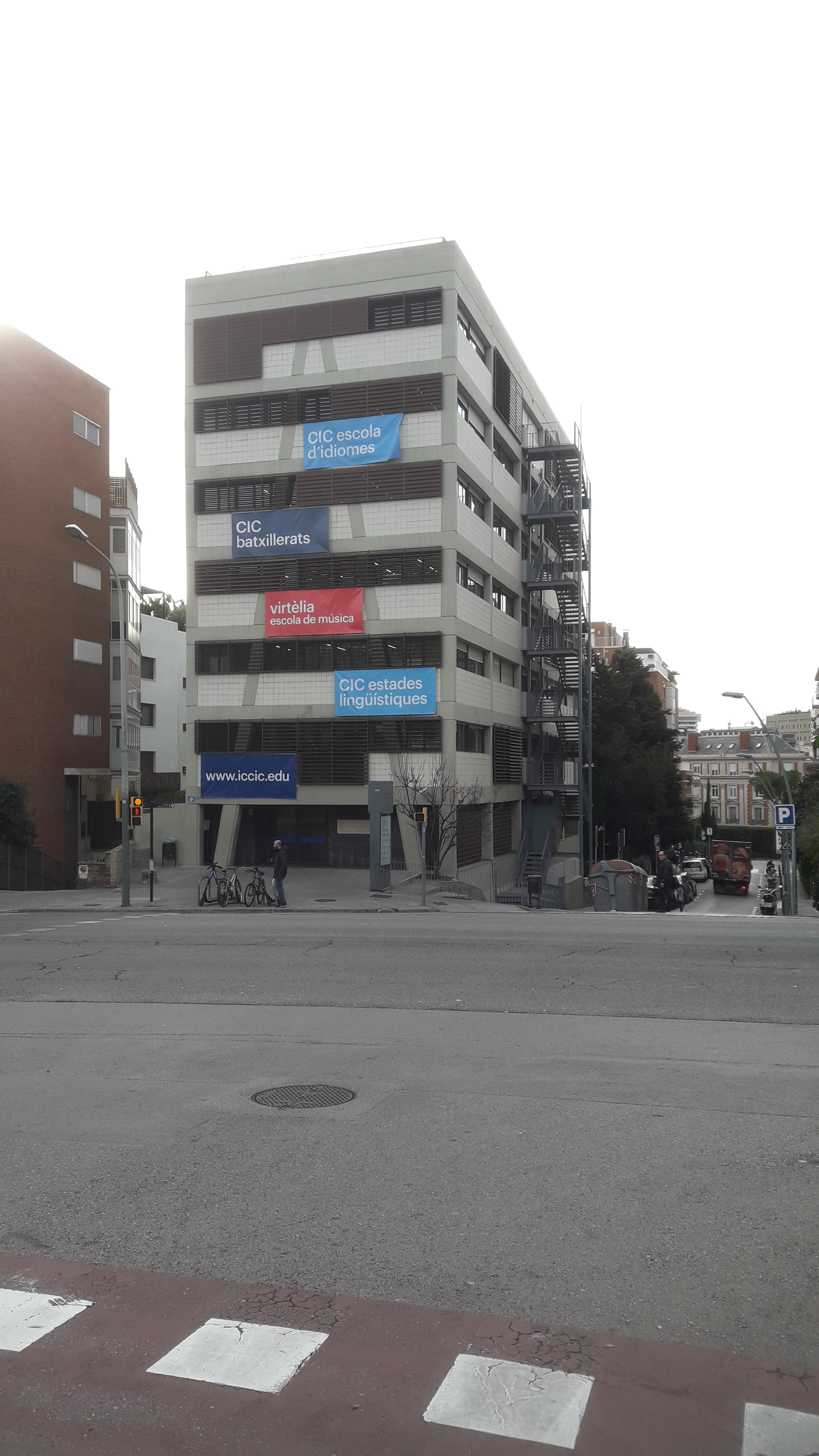
- Other name: ICCIC
- Founder: Maria Rosa Farré Escofet
- Parent institution: Centre d'Influència Catòlica
- President: Joaquim Triadú Vila-Abadal
- Director: Carles Duarte Montserrat
- Language: Catalan
- Website: www.iccic.edu/institucional

The Cultural Institution of the Center of Catholic Influence (ICCIC) is an educational institution at the service of Catalan society.

== History ==
The ICCIC was founded in 1952 in Sant Gervasi in Barcelona by the teacher Maria Rosa Farré Escofet as an offshoot of the Centre for Women's Catholic Influence (CICF). Its aim was to introduce women into the cultural ethnography of those years and start projects related to their cultural and religious identities. During the years of the Franco dictatorship (1939–1975), the ICCIC and its parent association CICF carried out a task of conservation and dissemination of the Catalan culture while being part of a broad cultural resistance movement. It was the first training school for Catalan teachers. The first concerts of what would become the Nova Cançó were organised there with the group Els Setze Jutges.

The institution, throughout these years, has been adapting to the demands of the current period and the needs of society. Its schools offer all educational stages of the regulated education system from pre-school to higher education. In the field of non-regulated education, it organises foreign language courses, music education, training for companies, language learning abroad, summer camps and other educational and cultural activities.

The CIC Cultural Institution is a private foundation that has been awarded the Creu de Sant Jordi by Generalitat de Catalunya. Its founder and director Maria Rosa Farré and its pedagogical director Joan Triadú also received this distinction.

Among the notable alumni of the institute are politician Max Cahner and photographer Manel Armengol.

== Organisation ==
The ICCIC has a number of different institutes:

- Thau Barcelona and Thau Sant Cugat are schools that offer the three levels of compulsory education. The Thau school in Sant Cugat was among the thirty schools chosen to start the Escola Nova 21 project.
- CIC baccalaureate school specialised in Baccalauréat which offers baccalaureate in Arts, Humanities and Social Sciences and Science and Technology. The Batxibac is also offered: a double qualification of the Catalan baccalaureate and the French baccalaureate.
- CIC-ELISAVA School with intermediate and higher level training courses in the Sports Activities branch and in Plastic Arts and Design and the official qualification of Football or Basketball Sports Technicians.
- CIC Language School in Barcelona, Sant Cugat and Mataró is where English, French and German languages are taught.
- Virtèlia Escola de Música that has been part of the CIC group since 1995. It has the recognition of the Department of Education of the Generalitat de Catalunya as a private music education centre and, in addition, it has been recognised as a Trinity examination centre certified by the Trinity College London
- In 2010, a new educational centre was opened in Gràcia where language courses are given. The administrative services of the group were also centralized there.
