= Manuel Sanchis =

Manuel Sanchis may refer to:

- Manuel Sanchis i Guarner (1911–1981), Valencian Spanish philologist, historian and writer
- Manuel Sanchís Martínez (1938–2017), Spanish footballer prominent during the 1960s
- Manuel Sanchís Hontiyuelo (born 1965), Spanish footballer prominent during the 1980s, son of Manuel Sanchis Martínez
