= Marta Pessarrodona =

Spanish poet and writer

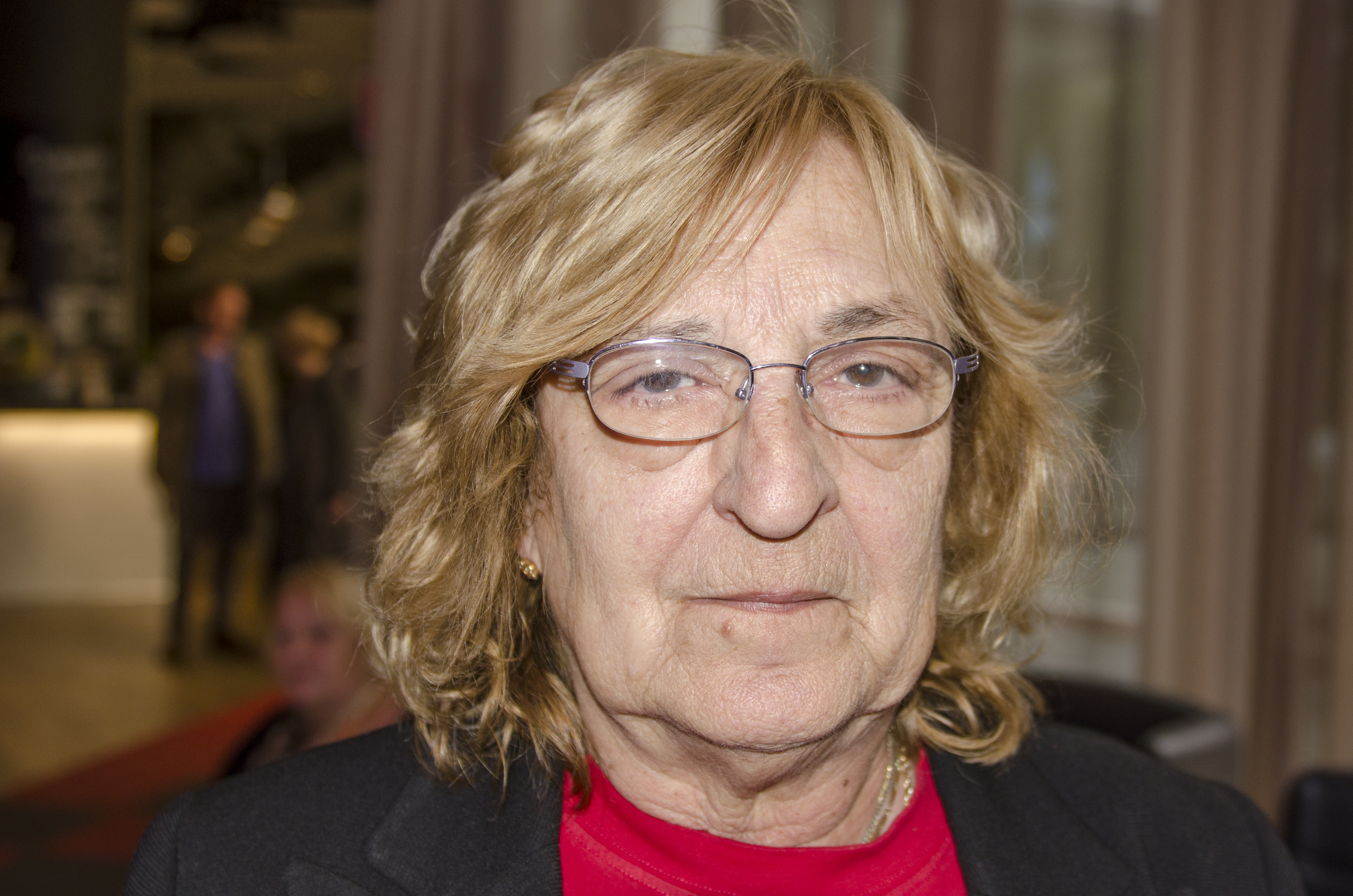
- Marta Pessarrodona
- Born: 18 November 1941
- Awards: Creu de Sant Jordi (1997); Premi d'Honor de les Lletres Catalanes (2019); Gold Medal of the Generalitat of Catalonia (2023)

Marta Pessarrodona y Artigues (born November 18, 1941) is a Catalan poet, storyteller and literary critic. She has also written essays and biographies. She is the author of books such as Primers dies de 1968 (1968), Setembre 30 (1969), Vida privada (1972), Memòria (1979), A favor meu, nostre (1981), Tria de poemes (1994), and L'amor a Barcelona (1998). In 1997, she received the Creu de Sant Jordi.

== Biography ==
Marta Pessarrodona y Artigues was born in Terrassa, Vallès Occidental, November 18, 1941.

In 1986, she became a lecturer in Spanish at the University of Nottingham. She has coordinated the International Commission for the Diffusion of Catalan Culture, in the Department of Culture of the Generalitat de Catalunya.In 2010, she was conducting research on the Exilio republicano español at the National Archive of Catalonia.

Pessarrodona has written several works on Virginia Woolf and the Bloomsbury Group, and has translated, Susan Sontag, Doris Lessing, Erica Jong, Simone de Beauvoir, and Marguerite Duras. Her poetry is realistic, without apparent rhetorical artifice, often sententious and ironic; it usually arises from meditation or memory. She regularly writes articles in Avui and El Temps. In 2007, an anthology of her poetic work was published. She writes in Catalan.

== Awards and honours ==
In 1997, she received the Creu de Sant Jordi from the Generalitat de Catalunya.

For her works published in 2010, the collection of poems Animals i plantas and the essays Francia: enero 1939. La cultura catalana exiliada and L’exili violeta, she was awarded the Premio Nacional de Literatura de la Generalidad de Cataluña (2011).

In 2019, she received the Premi d'Honor de les Lletres Catalanes, awarded by the association Òmnium Cultural.

A library in Mira-sol neighborhood of Sant Cugat del Vallès is named in her honor.

== Selected works ==
- Primers dies de 1968 (1968)
- Setembre 30 (prologado por Gabriel Ferrater, 1969)
- Vida privada (1972)
- Memòria (1979)
- A favor meu, nostre (1981)
- Berlin suite (1985)
- Homenatge a Walter Benjamin (1988)
- Les senyores-senyores ens els triem calbs (1988)
- Nessa: narracions (1988)
- Tria de poemes (1994)
- L'amor a Barcelona (1998)
- Fauna (1994)
- Barcelona, una nova ciutat europea (1995)
- Montserrat Roig: un retrat
- Maria Aurèlia Capmany: un retrat
- Frederica Montseny: un retrat
- El segle de les dones (2002)
- Virginia Woolf in the Midlands (Londres. Anglo-Catalan Society, 2004)
- Caterina Albert: un retrat, amb fotografies de Pilar Aymerich (Institut Català de la Dona, 2005)
- Mercè Rodoreda i el seu temps (2005)
- Donasses. Protagonistes de la Catalunya moderna (2006).
- Poemes 1969-2007: Antologia (Editorial Meteora, 2007)
- Animals i plantes (Editorial Meteora, 2010)
- França 1939. La cultura catalana exiliada (2010).
- L'exili violeta (Editorial Meteora, 2010)
- A favor nostre. Antologia de poemes i pròleg a cura d'Àngels Gregori (Godall Edicions, 2019)
