= Valencian Museum of Ethnology =

Museum located in the city of Valencia, mediterranean Spain

Coordinates: 39°28′42.32″N 0°22′59.26″W

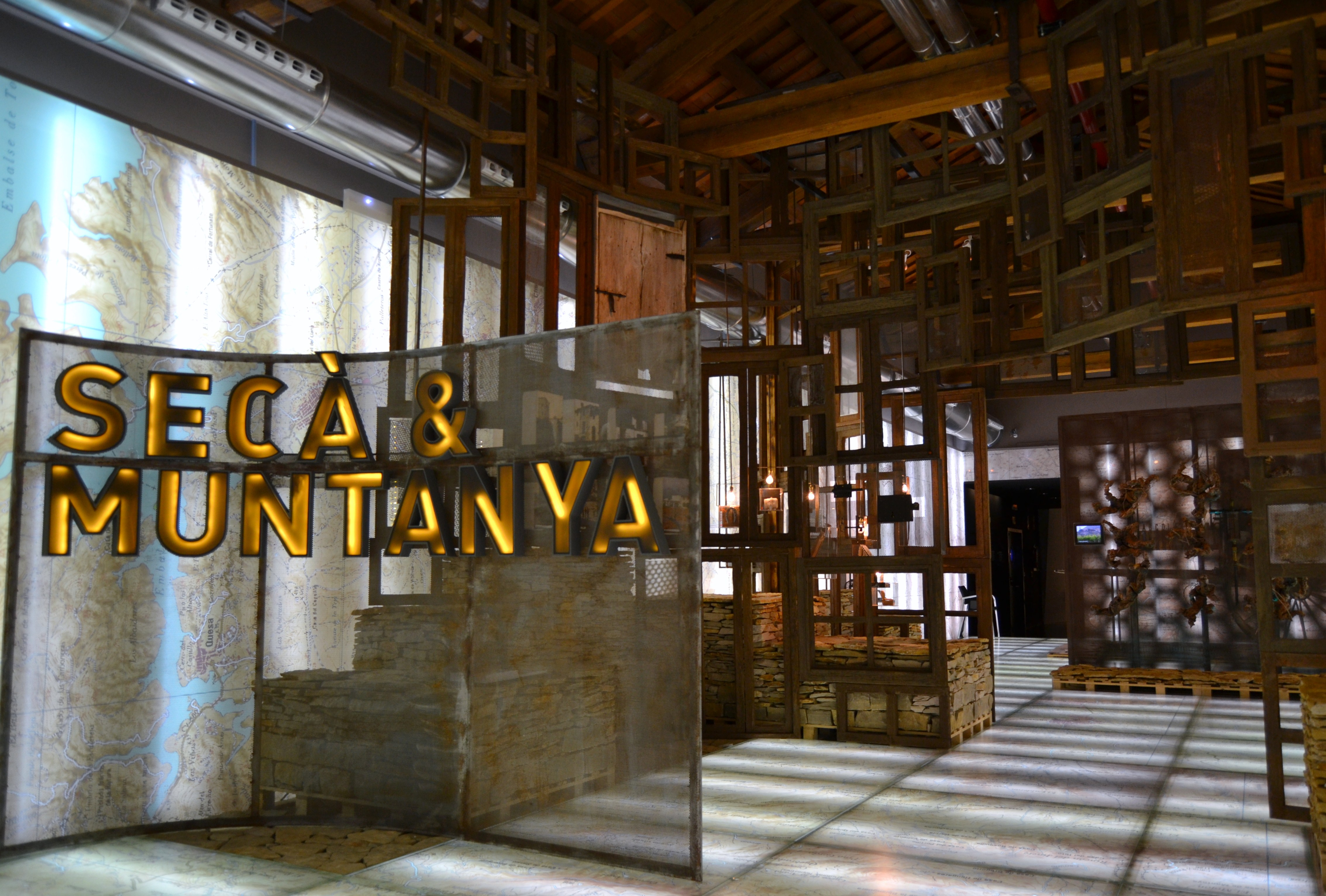

The Valencian Museum of Ethnology (Catalan: Museu Valencià d'Etnologia) is a museum located in the city of Valencia, mediterranean Spain. The museum mission defines it as cultural institution primarily devoted to collect, research and communicate the tangible and intangible heritage related to traditional and popular Valencian culture. The mission underlines that the museum also aims to permanently question fundamental aspects of the culture, as the dynamics that built it and force it to evolve, as well as its diversity. Although fundamentally devoted to Valencian cultural identity within a Mediterranean context, this museum also works to give visitors the chance to understand the challenges and dynamics of culture as a whole and from a contemporary perspective.

== History ==
The end of Franco's dictatorship and the political transition of the late 1970s and early 1980s witnessed the re-emergency of culturally distinct identities within the Spanish state. As part of this wave, and somehow revitalizing some other historical attempts, the Valencian Museum of Ethnology was originally impulsed by Joan Francesc Mira, an intellectual and anthropologist deeply interested in the valencian cultural identity. The institution was finally created in 1982 by the regional government called Diputació de València and placed in its current location at the Beneficència Cultural Centre, in the city center of València.

The museum finally opened its doors in 1983 with four staff members. Among its initials goals was to build up an ethnographic collection referring to valencian traditional culture and in particular that part of it related to rural areas and activities, already then, in a clear process of disappearance. In a few years an interesting collection in agrarian technology was gathered constituting the core collection of the museum that has been enlarged in later years.

== Activities ==
As an institution rooted within the city of Valencian and the region of Valencia, the museum is constantly engaged in working with different communities along this territorial framework. Traveling exhibitions and workshops are part of its day-to-day activity; museum curators are constantly learning and sharing their knowledge in villages and cities in the area in close collaboration with cultural associations are individuals. The museum has developed a close relationships with many smaller museums across the territory with the aim of helping local communities access to quality cultural events, or else, broadcast their views, knowledge and identities through closely related cultural institutions.

At its site in the Centre Cultural la Beneficència in València city, the museum has a permanent exhibit presented in three sections: La ciutat viscuda. Ciutats valencianes en trànsit, 1800-1940 (The lived town. Valencian towns in transition, 1800–1940), Horta i marjal (Market gardens and marshes) and Secà i muntanya (drylands and mountains), that show a summary of the many aspects of popular and traditional valencian culture. In this center, the museum offers its programme of temporary exhibitions that revise topics related to the museum mission. Along with temporary and permanent exhibitions, an intense activity of cultural events as educational workshops for children and families, seminars, film sessions, music performances and guided visits by the museum staff, are also part of the museum everyday life. Most of these are activities relate to traditional and popular culture and often bring multicultural perspectives, helping the museum to engage with its surrounding community at the city of València.

The museum equally aims to stimulate research and engage in public education in the fields of ethnology and anthropology; It is a close partner of the Valencian Association of Anthropology and works hand to hand with the university community. Among the museum research projects, the Valencian Oral Memory Project stands out. This project started by the museum staff in the early 2000s, has been, and still is, collecting oral memory from informers in communities all along the Valencian territory. Today, this project is one of the most important oral memory databases referring to a Mediterranean culture and it is an essential research tool for scholars interested in sociology, anthropology, contemporary history and Catalan/valencian language. An important part of the interviews can be seen in the web site: www.museudelaparaula.es

The museum publishes a periodical, Revista valenciana d’etnologia (Valencian journal of ethnology), and the monograph collections "Temes d'etnografia valenciana" and "Ethnos". The majority of articles are published in Castilian or Catalan/Valencian languages. The Museum has a library and document centre (including a photographic archive) specialised in ethnology and anthropology. The facilities of the museum include the former psychiatric hospital of Bétera, where the museum staff manages a collection of about 10,000 catalogued objects.

They also have a collaboration programme with 20 local museums.

== Material culture collection ==
The objectual collection of the museum has key examples of objects relating to traditional farming and everyday life in the area. After the initial effort to gather rural based material culture, the museum staff moved also into urban origin items. In later years collection policies have broaden to allow the arrival of more contemporary, significant items related to popular culture. Most of the objects are of a valencian origin, only a small amount (as the Carsi Collection with material from the Congo/Zaire area) belongs to other geographical areas. In the last few years the section of the museum related to clothing has been increased greatly. The arrival of the Casa Insa collection, mainly conformed by theater and festivals customs reflecting most of the 20th century, and still being processed by the museum staff, represents an important quality impact on the museum collection.

== Bibliography ==
- Museu Valencià d'Etnologia. Museu Valencià d'Etnologia. 2011. ISBN 9788493834760. OCLC 804825620.
- Seguí, Joan (2015). El desafío de exponer : proceso y retos museográficos. Arrieta Urtizberea, Iñaki. Bilbao: Universidad del País Vasco, Servicio Editorial. ISBN 9788490821909. OCLC 935117687.
