= Tomàs Garcés =

Catalan poet and lawyer

Tomàs Garcés i Miravet
- Born: October 9, 1901; Barcelona, Catalonia, Spain
- Died: November 16, 1993 (aged 92); Barcelona, Catalonia, Spain
- Occupations: Poet; lawyer
- Known for: Short lyric poetry; contributions to Catalan literary magazines

Tomàs Garcés i Miravet (Catalan pronunciation: [tuˈmaz ɣəɾˈses]; 9 October 1901 – 16 November 1993, Barcelona) was a Catalan poet and lawyer.

Garcés was born in Barcelona. He studied law, philosophy, and literature at the University of Barcelona.

At the time of the Spanish Civil War Garcés fled to France where he was a teacher of Spanish language in the University of Toulouse. He returned to Catalonia in 1947.

Tomas was called "The Catalan poet of song" for his short regular verses.

He worked in several literary publications: Mar Vella, which he founded, and also Ariel, Serra d'Or, Revista de Catalunya and also La Publicitat, in which he published his works under the pseudonym "Ship-Boy".

For his works he was awarded several prizes, including The City of Barcelona Award, The Generalitat de Catalunya award, Crítica Serra d'Or, Creu de Sant Jordi and Premi d'Honor de les Lletres Catalanes.

== Selected bibliography ==
- Vint cançons, Edicions Lira, 1923
- L'ombra del lledoner, Imprenta Omega, 1924
- Paisatges i lectures, Llibreria Catalònia, 1926
- Cançons, 1926
- El somni, Les edicions d'art, 1927
- Cançó fidel, Impr. Altés, 1946
- El caçador, Editorial Selecta, 1947
- El senyal, Atenes A. G., 1949
- Paradis (co-authored with Joan Triadú), Atenas, A.G., 1949
- La Nit de Sant Joan, 1951
- Llibre de Nadal, Editorial Selecta, 1951
- Llibre de la Mare de Déu de Núria, Editorial Selecta, 1952
- Viatge d’octubre, La Polígrafa, 1955
- Cinc poetes italians, Ed. La Polígrafa, 1961
- Obra poètica, Editorial Selecta, 1961
- Quadern de la Selva, Ed. La Polígrafa, 1962
- Sobre Salvat-Papasseit i altres escrits, Editorial Selecta, 1972
- Els dotze llibres d'Agelet, Institut d'Estudis Ilerdencs, 1981
- El temps que fuig: escrits amb data, Laertes, 1984
- Només els somnis són veritat, Galaxia Gutenberg, 2021
