= Vicent Andrés Estellés =

Spanish journalist and poet (1924–1993)

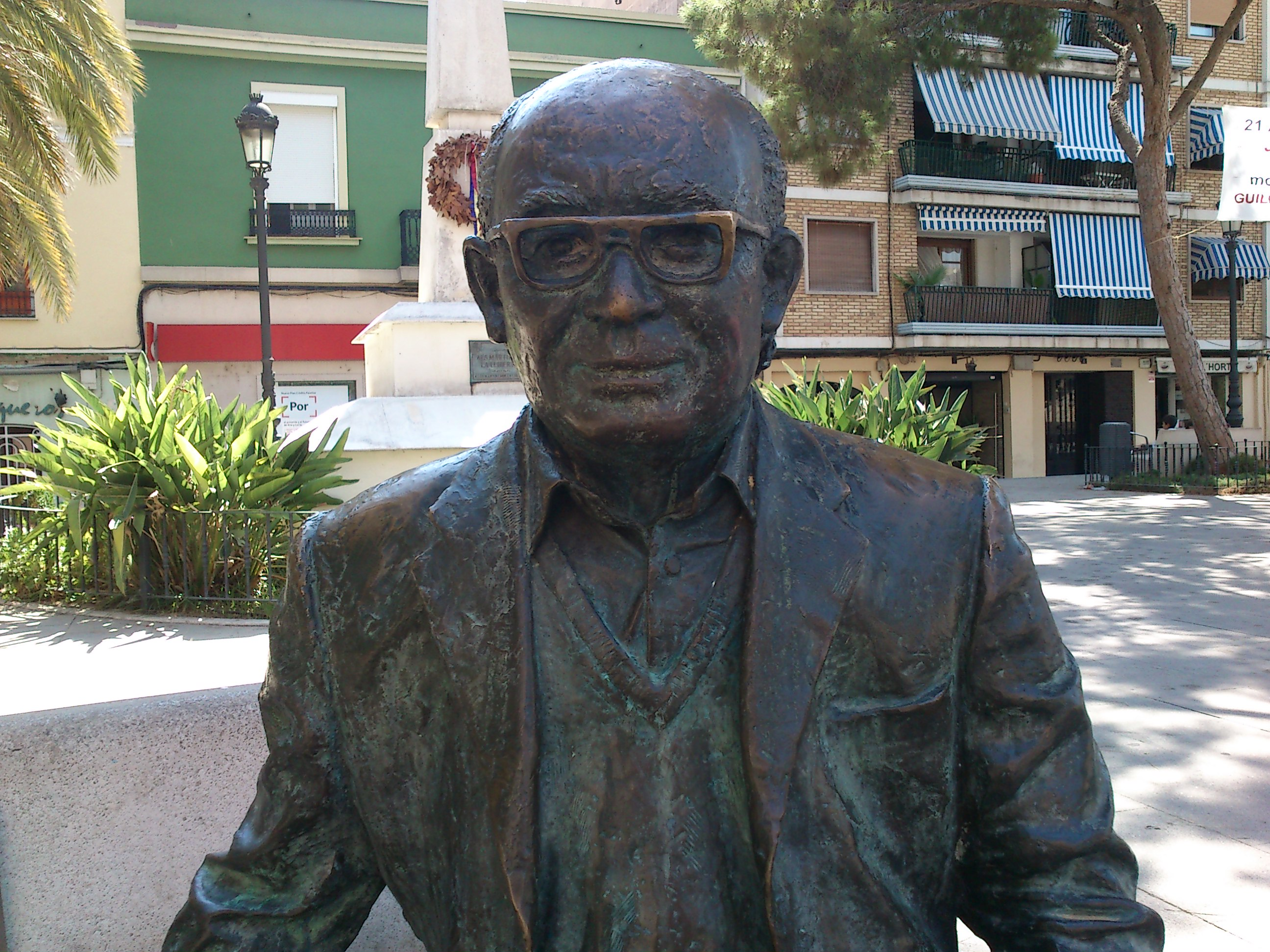
- Bronze statue representing Vicent Andrés Estellés located in Emilio Castelar square, in Burjassot
- Born: September 4, 1924; Burjassot, Valencia, Spain
- Died: March 27, 1993 (aged 68); Valencia, Spain
- Occupations: Journalist and poet
- Writing career
- Language: Catalan
- Notable work: Llibre de meravelles (Book of Marvels)

Vicent Andrés Estellés (Valencian pronunciation: [viˈsɛnt anˈdɾes esteˈʎes]; 4 September 1924 in Burjassot, Valencia – 27 March 1993 in Valencia) was a Valencian journalist and poet. He is considered one of the main renovators of modern Valencian poetry, with a similar role to that of Ausiàs March or Joan Roís de Corella in earlier periods, and one of the most important poets in Catalan language in the 20th Century.

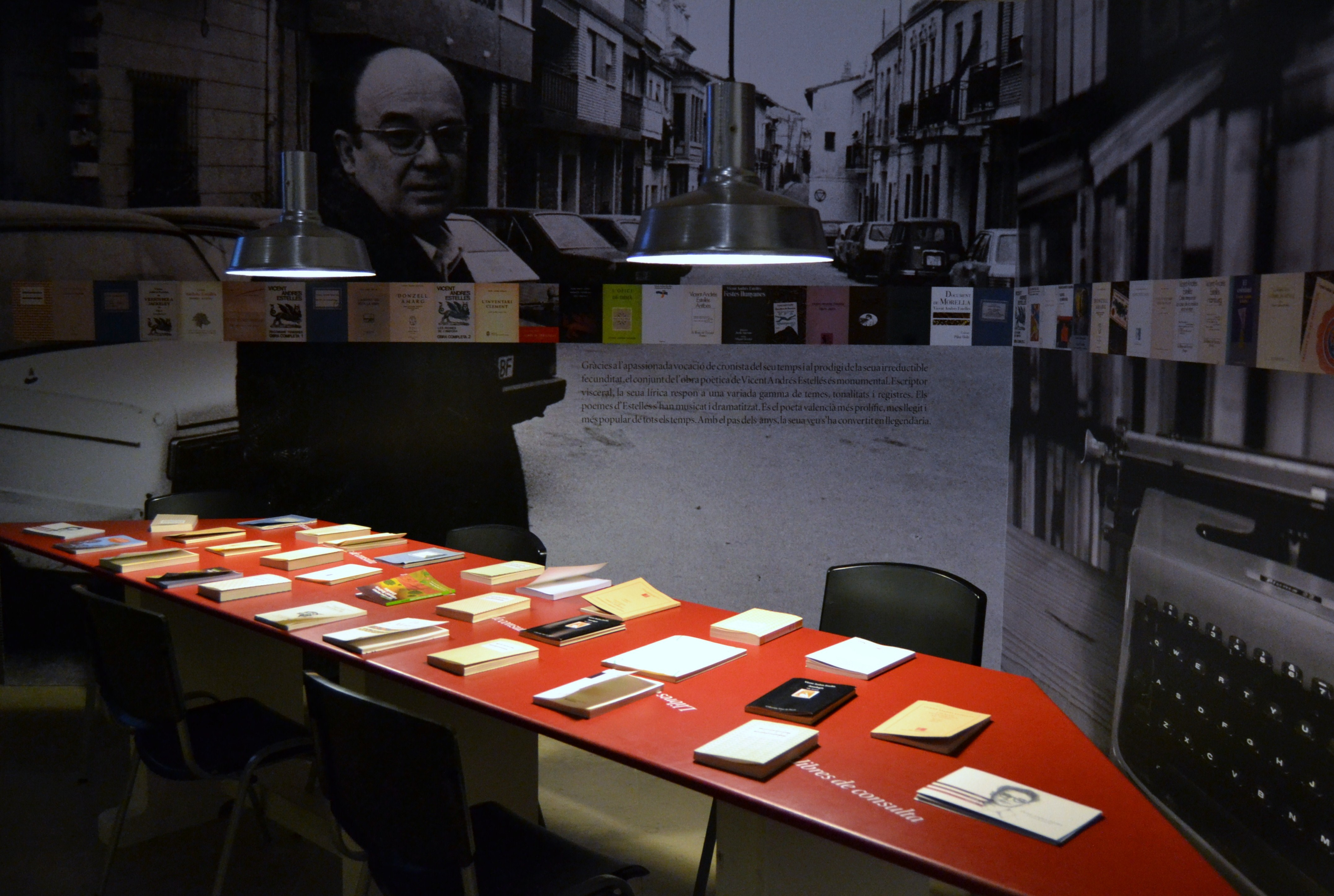
Exhibition about the life and works of Estellés in Convento del Carmen (Carmen's Convent), Valencia, 2013

== Biography ==
Vicent Andrés Estellés was 12 years old when the Spanish Civil War broke out. During its course, he trained to become both a baker and a goldsmith, and learned to write on a typewriter. The war had a profound impact on his work, in which death is a recurring theme.

Estellés spent his teenage years in Valencia, where he developed an interest in literature. During that period, he was most influenced by Charles Baudelaire, Pablo Neruda, Paul Éluard, Cesare Pavese, and Walt Whitman, and by poetry in Catalan language, such as Catalan poets Màrius Torres, Jacint Verdaguer, Josep Carner, Carles Riba, Santiago Rusiñol and Joan Salvat-Papasseit, as well as the Valencian poet Ausiàs March and the Balearic poet Bartomeu Rosselló-Pòrcel.

In 1942, at the age of 18, Estellés moved to Madrid to study for a degree in Journalism. Three years later, he left to do his military service in Navarre. At the age of 24, he moved back to Valencia and became a journalist for the newspaper Las Provincias. He befriended Joan Fuster, Xavier Casp and Manuel Sanchis i Guarner – all three of them well-known Valencian writers in Catalan – and met Isabel, who would later influence his writings as well.

In 1955 Estellés married Isabel. The couple had a daughter, who died when she was four months old. After the death, which Estellés recalled in Coral romput, death became a recurring theme in his works.

In 1958 he became editor-in-chief of Las Provincias, only to be dismissed for political reasons in 1978, thus being forced into early retirement at the age of 54. This allowed him to devote himself entirely to writing and engaging in a variety of cultural activities, such as art exhibitions. That same year, Estellés was awarded the Premi d'Honor de les Lletres Catalanes. In 1984 he was awarded the Premi d'Honor de les Lletres Valencianes.

Estellés spent a few years in Benimodo, a municipality in the comarca of Ribera Alta, in the Valencian Community. During this period, he combined poetry with prose in his works. He received several awards in the 1990s, including the Premis Octubre.

== Works ==
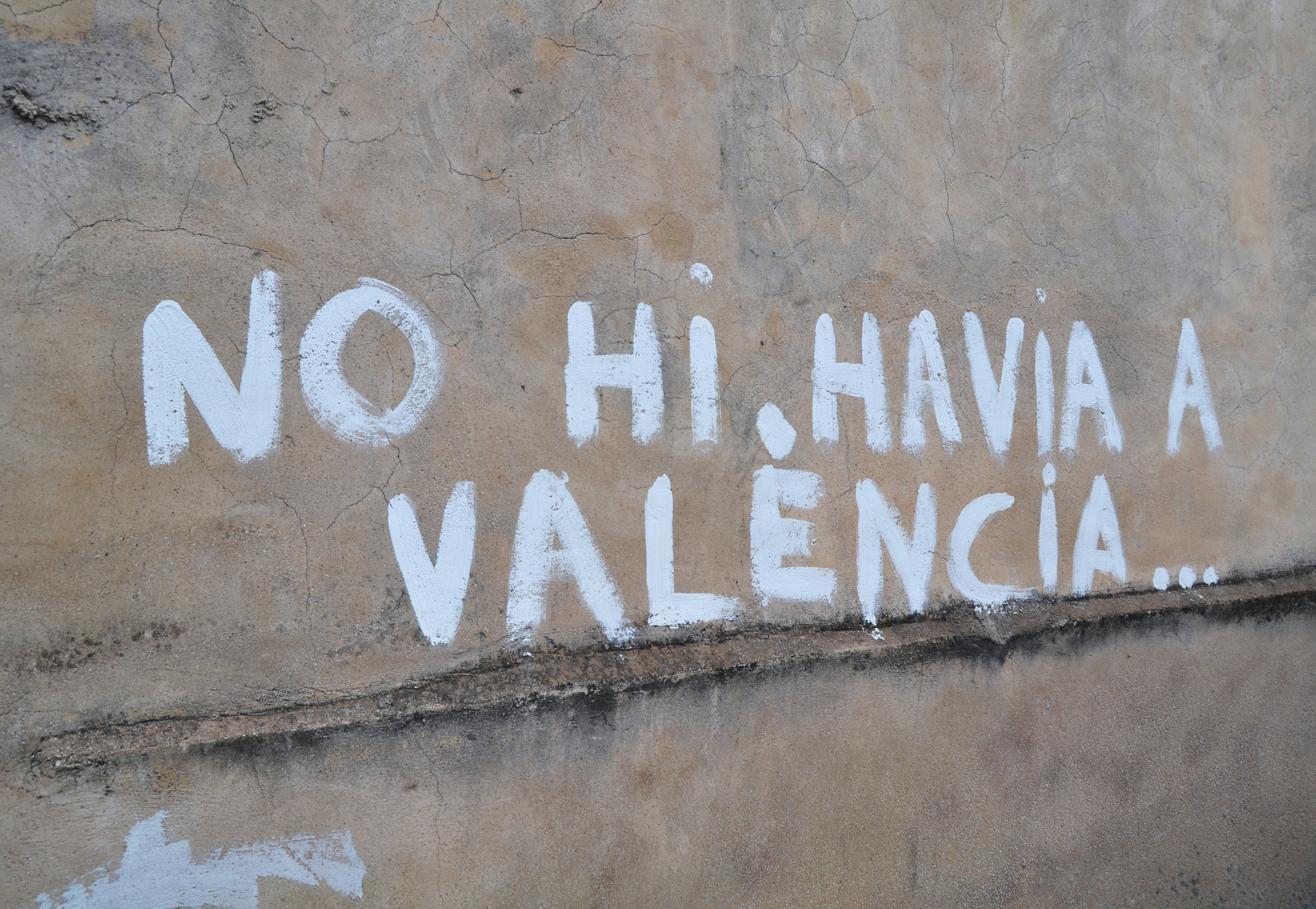
Graffiti quoting the first words of a famous poem by Vicent Andrés Estellés (Els Poblets, 2012)

The works of Vicent Andrés Estellés, one of the most important Catalan-language poets of the 20th century, are diverse and extensive. Although he is better known for his poetry, he also wrote novels, plays, screenplays, as well as his memoirs. The main themes of his work are death and sex, and they are always dealt with from a popular, everyday, simple, direct, and even vulgar perspective. It is difficult to categorize his entire work. In fact, some works were reworked from books or private notes such as "Manuscrits de Burjassot" (the Manuscripts from Burjassot), "Cançoner" (Anthology) or "Mural del País Valencià" (Mural of the Valencian Country), from which he only published extracts or the poems he considered most appropriate.

His first publications were "Ciutat a cau d'orella" (Whispered City) (1953), "La nit" (The Night) (1956), "Donzell amarg" (Bitter Youth) (1958) and "L'amant de tota la vida" (The Lifelong Lover) (1966), which are only a small selection of what he had written at that point.

From the 1970s onwards, he published more frequently and received numerous awards. He published "Lletres de canvi" (Bills of Exchange)(1970), "Primera audició" (First Audition) (1971), "L'inventari clement" (The Clement Inventory) (1971). In (1971) he published two major works: "La clau que obri tots els panys" (The Key That Opens All Locks) (which contained "Coral Romput" (Broken Coral)) and the best-seller "Llibre de les meravelles" (Book of Marvels), perhaps his most famous work.

From that moment onwards, Estellés began to gain recognition and published his Complete Works, including "Recomane tenebres" (I Would Recommend the Dark) (1972), "Les pedres de l'àmfora" (The Stones from the Amphora) (1974), "Manual de conformitats" (Manual of Conformities) (1977), "Balanç de Mar" (Swing of the Sea) (1978), "Cant temporal" (Temporary Singing) (1980), "Les homilies d'Organyà" (Homilies of Organyà) (1981) which includes "Coral romput", "Versos para Jackeley" (Verses for Jackeley) (1983), "Vaixell de vidre" (Glass Ship) (1984), "La lluna de colors" (Colourful Moon) (1986), y "Sonata d'Isabel" (Isabel’s Sonata) (1990).

His most important prose works are "El coixinet" (The Little Cushion) (1988), his play "L'oratori del nostre temps" (The Oratory of Our Times) (1978), and his memoirs: "Tractat de les maduixes" (Strawberry Treaty) (1985), "Quadern de Bonaire" (Bonaire’s Notebook) (1985), and "La parra boja" (The Crazy Vine) (1988).

== Aesthetics ==
The three levels of oppression that are evident in his works are the reason why Estellés's aesthetics have been described as "irate".

- Personal oppression: He describes a vital situation in which persecution and humiliation are constant. This situation unavoidably requires being assertive and acting consequently. It shows love as a possibility of salvation and redemption.
- Collective oppression: He describes a collective life characterized by economic misery, fear of being socially criticized, and a situation of ignorance devastating the people which he feels he belongs to.
- National oppression: He describes a sense of despair — a particular sensitivity caused by cultural, linguistic, and national abduction. He is sensitive to the Valencian people's fight to dignify their own culture.

Some of his most frequently recurring topics are death, love and eroticism, hunger and political oppression, as well as daily life. Put together, these themes provide a considerable formal and tonal variety.

== Recognition ==
In 1993, he received an honorary doctorate from the University of Valencia.

=== Awards ===
The most important awards he received are:

- 1978, Premi d'Honor de les Lletres Catalanes (Catalan Literary Lifetime Achievement Award) awarded by the Generalitat of Catalonia.
- 1982, Premi Creu de Sant Jordi awarded by the Generalitat of Catalonia.
- 1990, Premi d'Honor de les Lletres Valencianes awarded by the Generalitat Valenciana.
- 1992, Porrot d'Honor de les Lletres Valencianes de Silla.
- 1994, Medalla de Oro al mérito en las Bellas Artes awarded by the Ministry of Culture of Spain after his death.

=== Statues and streets ===
In several towns in the Valencian Country, Streets have been named after Estellés.

There is also a bronze statue in Emilio Castelar square, in Burjassot, Andrés Estellés's birthplace. This piece, showing him sitting on a park bench, writing on top of a pile of books, has suffered four loutish attacks. For instance, it was covered in blue paint and the arms of his glasses were broken. Likewise, extreme right blavers attempted to destroy a bust of Estellés that was put up in Burjassot in 1979.

== Works set to music ==
Estellés is one of the most popular Catalan-language poets among musicians. His works have been set to music several times, mostly by Ovidi Montllor. Montollr's version of the poem "Els Amants" (The Lovers) is especially remarkable — it has been performed live on many occasions. Other singers, singer-songwriters, or groups that have also set his works to music are Paco Muñoz, Celdoni Fonoll, Maria del Mar Bonet, Obrint Pas, Pau Alabajos, Remigi Palmero, Vicent Torrent, Miquel Lluis, Els pavesos, Lluis the Sifoner, and Esteve Ferre.

== Bibliography ==
- Agustí, Carme (1999). Reciclatge (Nivell superior) (in Catalan). Paterna: 3i4. ISBN 8475025625.
- Pérez Montaner, Jaume (1993). Una aproximació a Vicent Andrés Estellés (in Catalan). Valencia: Climent. ISBN 8475020348.
