= Maria Beneyto =

Spanish poet

- Born: Maria Beneyto Cuñat; 14 May 1925; Valencia, Spain
- Died: 15 March 2011 (aged 85); Valencia, Spain
- Writing career
- Language: Spanish; Valencian
- Genre: Poetry

Maria Beneyto Cuñat (14 May 1925 – 15 March 2011) was a Spanish poet. She was a recipient of the Premio de las Letras Valencianas.

== Biography ==
Born in Valencia, Beneyto moved with her family to Madrid at age three, a city where she remained until 1937. After receiving an education in Castilian, in the first years after the Spanish Civil War she encountered an environment where, for the first time, Valencian occupied a prominent position. It was in these years that her dedication to writing solidified, in an especially self-taught manner which was common to a great number of writers of her generation. She also began a relationship with literary groups of Valencia. This education, straddling the two cultures of the Castilian learned in Madrid and her native Valencian, explains Maria Beneyto's literary bilingualism.

Maria Beneyto died on 15 March 2011.

== Work ==
Beneyto's earliest work was in Castilian: Canción olvidada (1947) and Eva en el tiempo (1952). During the 1950s she published her first two poems in Valencian: Altra veu (1952) and Ratlles a l'aire (1956). In 1958 she produced her first prose work, the Castilian novel La prometida. She did not return to publishing in Valencian until the 1960s, with the novels La gent que viu al món (1966) and La dona forta (1967). In 1977 she published the poetry collection Vidrio herido de sangre, and then began a long period of silence. This continued until the 1990s.

In 1993 she published her Antología poética and the collections Tras sepulta la ternura and Poemas de las cuatro estaciones, as well as three collections in Castilian: Archipiélago (unpublished poetry 1975–1993), Nocturnidad y alevosía y Hojas para algún día de noviembre, and an Antología poética. In 1994 a new collection appeared: Para desconocer la primavera. 1997 was again a prolific year in terms of publications, with a reissue of La gent que viu al món, the anthology Poesía (1952–1993), and a new collection: Elegías de la piedra quebradiza. Her last collection was published in 2003: Bressoleig insomnia anger.

Throughout her literary career, Beneyto's work had been anthologized in several poetry collections, including Las voces de la medusa (1991), Paisaje emergente. Treinta poetas catalanas del siglo XX (1999), Contemporáneas. Antología de poetas de los Países Catalanes (1999), and Homenaje a la palabra. Veinticinco años de poesía al País Valenciano (1999). This places her as one of the main figures – along with Vicent Andrés Estellés, Carmelina Sánchez-Cutillas, and Joan Fuster – of the Valencian poetic generation of the 1950s.

== Publications ==
- Canción olvidada – 1947
- Eva en el tiempo – 1952
- Altra veu – 1952
- Ratlles a l'aire – 1952
- Poemas de la Ciudad – 1956 (Joaquin Horta Editor, Barcelona)
- La prometida – 1958
- La gent que viu al món – 1966
- La dona forta – 1967
- Vidre ferit de sang – 1977
- Antologia poètica i els poemaris – 1993
- Després de soterrada la tendresa – 1993
- Poemes de les quatre estacions – 1993
- Archipiélago – 1993
- Nocturnidad y alevosía – 1993
- Hojas para algún día de noviembre – 1993
- Bressoleig a l'insomni de la ira – 2003

== Honors ==
- 1992: Premio de las Letras Valencianas
- January 2000: Recognized by the Corts Valencianes, on the occasion of International Women's Day

== Sources ==
- Lacueva i Lorenz, Maria (2013). Elles prenen la paraula. Recuperació crítica i transmissió a les aules de les escriptores valencianes de postguerra: una perspectiva des de l'educació literària (Thesis) (in Catalan). University of Valencia.
