= Feliu Formosa =

Catalan dramatist, poet and translator (born 1934)

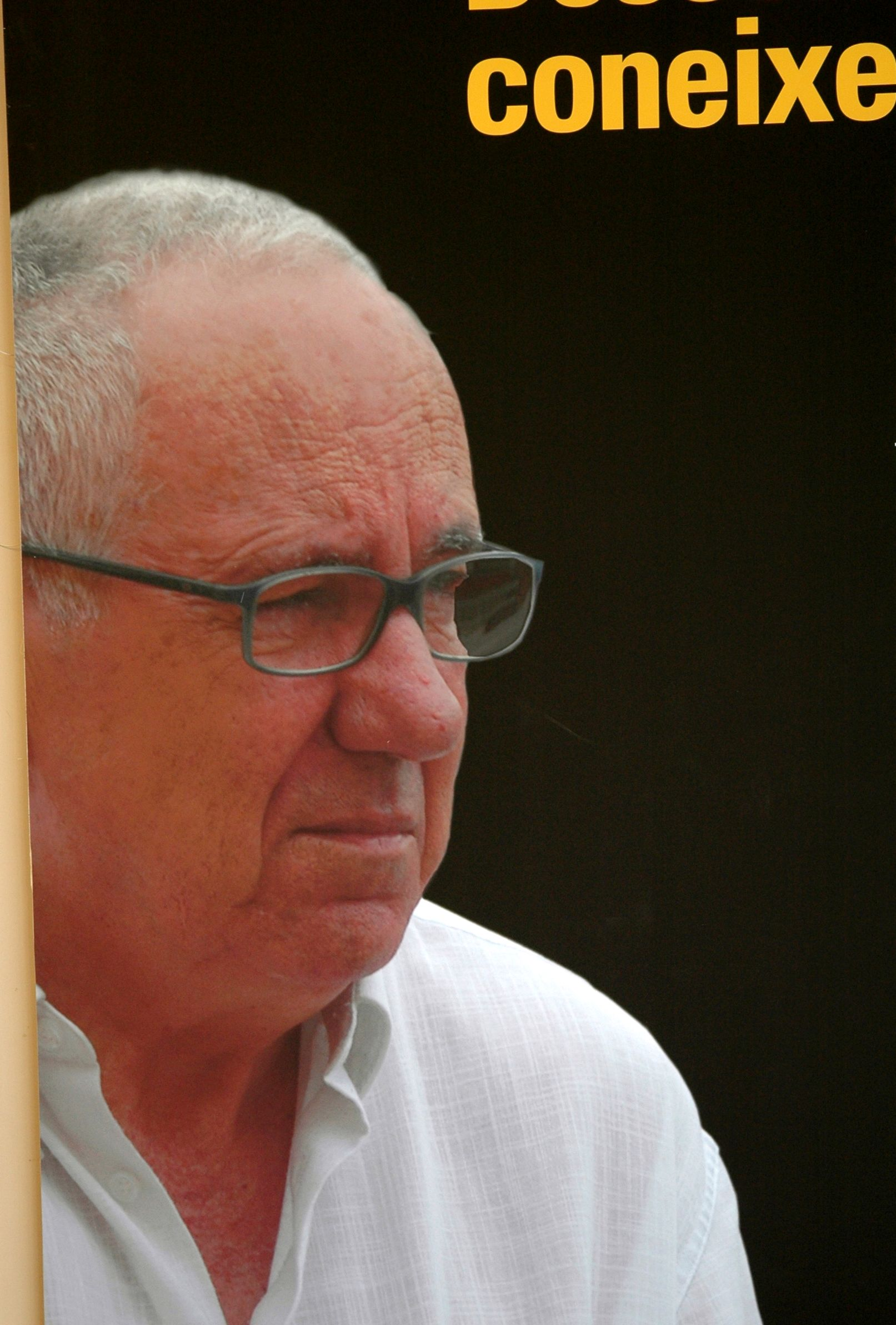
Feliu Formosa.JPG

Feliu Formosa Torres (born 10 September 1934 in Sabadell, Catalonia, Spain) is a Spanish dramatist, poet and translator from Catalonia. He has served as dean of Institució de les Lletres Catalanes.

He translated dramatic works by Bertolt Brecht, Ernst Toller, Tankred Dorst, Anton Chekhov, Henrik Ibsen, August Strindberg, Thomas Bernhard, Friedrich Dürrenmatt, Friedrich Schiller, Botho Strauss; poetry by Georg Trakl, Goethe and François Villon; narrative by Thomas Mann, Hermann Hesse, Robert Musil, Heinrich Böll, Franz Kafka, Joseph Roth or Heinrich von Kleist; and essays by Lessing and Peter Weiss.

During his career has received several awards, like Carles Riba Award of poetry for Llibre dels viatges (1972), the Crítica Serra d'Or Award of memories for El present vulnerable (1980), the Ciutat de Palma-Joan Alcover Award for Amb effecte (1986), the Lletra d'Or Award for Semblança (1987), the Premi d'Honor de les Lletres Catalanes (Catalan Letters Lifetime Achievement Award) (2005).

In 1987 was awarded with the Creu de Sant Jordi and in 2007 with the National Theatre Award, both by the Catalan Government.

== Published works ==
=== Poetry ===
- 1973: Albes breus a les mans. Barcelona: Proa
- 1973: Llibre de les meditacions. Barcelona: Ed. 62
- 1975: Raval. Barcelona: Ed. 62
- 1976: Cançoner. Barcelona: Vosgos
- 1978: Llibre dels viatges. Barcelona: Proa
- 1980: Si tot és dintre. Barcelona: Grijalbo
- 1986: Semblança. Barcelona: El Mall
- 1987: Amb effecte (amb Joan Casas). Barcelona: Empúries
- 1989: Pols al retrovisor (amb Joan Casas). València: Eliseu Climent / 3i4
- 1991: La campana de vidre. Barcelona: Cafè Central
- 1992: Impasse. Barcelona: Eumo - Cafè Central
- 1992: Per Puck. Barcelona: Columna
- 1994: Al llarg de tota una impaciència. Barcelona: Ed. 62
- 2000: Immediacions. Barcelona: Ed. 62 - Empúries
- 2001: Cap claredat no dorm. Lleida: Pagès
- 2004: Darrere el vidre. Poesia 1972–2002. Barcelona: Ed. 62 - Empúries
- 2006: Centre de brevetat. Barcelona: Meteora

=== Theatre ===
- 1968: L'encens i la carn. Barcelona: Ed. 62
- 1970: Cel.la 44. Palma de Mallorca: Daedalus
- 1998: El miracle de la vaca cega. Lleida: Pagès

=== Autobiography ===
- 1979: El present vulnerable. Barcelona: Laia
- 2005: A contratemps. Catarroja: Perifèric
- 2005: El somriure de l'atzar: Diaris II. Catarroja: Perifèric

=== Essay ===
- 1970: Per una acció teatral. Barcelona: Ed. 62

=== Narrative ===
- 1996: Les nits del Llamp. Barcelona: La Magrana

== Awards ==
- In 1997 he was awarded the Premio Nacional a la Obra de un Traductor.
