= Joan Triadú =

Catalan literary critic, academic and writer (1921–2010)

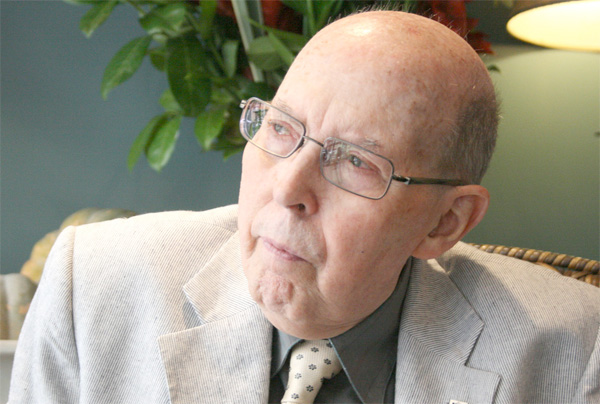
- Born: 30 July 1921; Ribes de Freser
- Died: 30 September 2010 (aged 89); Barcelona
- Resting place: Cementiri de Cantonigros
- Education: University of Barcelona
- Occupation: Literary critic, academic, writer
- Employers: CIC Cultural Institution; (1963–1997); University of Liverpool; (1948–1950)
- Known for: Preservation of the Catalan language
- Spouse: Pilar Vila-Abadal
- Children: Joaquim Triadú i Vila-Abadal, Teresa Triadú i Vila-Abadal

Joan Triadu i Font (30 July 1921 – 30 September 2010) was a Catalan literary critic, academic and writer. A cultural and resistant anti-Francoist activist, he was involved in many important Catalan cultural projects in the twentieth century, including the magazines Serra d'Or and Ariel, the newspaper Avui and the association Òmnium Cultural. He was a pioneer in the teaching of Catalan language courses after the Spanish Civil War. As an educationalist, he was the general director of the Cultural Institute of the Centre of Catholic Influence, an institution that created the Thau Barcelona School in 1963 and the Thau Sant Cugat School in 1996. Joan Triadú Year, which marked the centenary of his birth, was celebrated in 2021.

== Life ==
Triadu was born in a working-class family in the town of Ribes de Freser. He attended school and passed the Baccalaureate in Barcelona in 1937. He subsequently qualified as a teacher after taking an intensive course organised by the Generalitat de Catalunya to address the shortage of teachers arising from the large numbers that had been conscripted for the Spanish Civil War, and the large numbers of refugees from the war that were arriving in the city. After passing this course, he passed the compulsory Catalan language examination and qualified as a Catalan teacher under the tutelage of Pompeu Fabra. Soon afterwards, in January 1938, he was appointed as an interim primary teacher by the Generalitat de Catalunya and assigned to the Francesc Ferrer i Guàrdia School in Granollers, where he taught until the end of the war.

After the Spanish Civil War ended, the new government did not recognise the academic qualifications that had been issued during the war, and Triadú had to sit the baccalaureate once again in 1939. He studied Classical Philology at the University of Barcelona during the 1939–1940 academic year, and also attended classes at the Catalan University Studies. He graduated in June 1942, but contracted tuberculosis soon afterwards, which forced him to undertake a lengthy convalescence, first in Barcelona and in Cantonigròs from June 1943 onwards.

He spent this time reading extensively, as well as other activities. The literary competition he organised was held every year for 25 years. Triadu returned to Barcelona in 1945, and after a period working as a teacher in various schools and institutions, he moved to England, where he became reader in Catalan at the University of Liverpool between 1948 and 1950.

He was the father of Joaquim Triadú i Vila-Abadal, Minister of the Government of the Generalitat under president Jordi Pujol, and Teresa Triadú i Vila-Abadal, for many years, director of the Thau Sant Cugat School.

=== Literary criticism ===
Before leaving for England in 1946, he became one of the founders of the magazine Ariel, where he began his work as a literary critic. The magazine was published clandestinely until 1951, when it was closed down by the authorities.

When he returned from England, his work as a critic took a new turn in 1951 with the publication of an Anthology of Catalan Poetry 1900-1950 and an Anthology of Catalan Storytellers. These collections were controversial due to his selection of the authors included, and the critical comments he made in them. Carles Riba was prominent among his choices. In 1953, he published an Anthology of Catalan lyric poetry in Oxford, which contained a long foreword, which he published himself the same year in Landscape of Catalan poetry.

When Triadú failed to include the poet Carles Fages de Climent in the latter anthology -apparently due to Triadú's dislike of Fages; conservatism, the letter devoted an epigram to him:

That poor Triadú

who has no gift for choosing
if when he chooses, chooses badly,

he's a poor chooser

— Carles Fages de Climent

However, the writer Tomàs Roig i Llop, a great friend of Fages, created another version of this famous epigram:

They say that Mr. Triadú

who has no gift for choosing
because he is a poor chooser

almost always chooses badly

— Tomàs Roig i Llop

Afterwards, he continued his work as a literary critic in magazines including Forja, Pont Blau, Vida Nova, Serra d'Or, the newspaper Avui and in various local, regional and institutional publications.

=== Cultural activism ===
During his convalescence, he began the Parish of Cantonigròs Poetry Competition with Jordi Parcerisas in 1944, under the auspices of the Roman Catholic Diocese of Vic and with the help of the rector of the parish of Sant Roc d'Amer in Catalonia, and especially Father Joseph Cruells i Rodellas from 1963 onwards. Leading figures in Catalan literature entered this competition, and it provided an excellent platform for highlighting the work of established writers and the discovery of new talents.

Triadú was one of the founders of the Barcelona Dramatic Association in 1954. In 1969, he was the architect of the transformation of the Cantonigròs poetry competition into the popular Pompeu Fabra Festival of Culture, which continued until 1993.

Triadú's concern with the welfare of the Catalan language led him to work extensively as a Catalan language teacher, and to become increasingly interested in training teachers of Catalan language and Catalan literature. He established the Catalan Studies Advisory Council in 1961 for this reason. From 1962 onwards he was a member of the Òmnium Cultural, an association promoting the Catalan language, and he was its Secretary General for many years, and complemented his work at the Catalan Studies Advisory Council with the founding of the Catalan Teaching Office in 1965. While a member of Òmnium Cultural, he was also involved in the conception and organisation of the Sant Jordi prize for novels, and the Premi d'Honor de les Lletres Catalanes. After the Generalitat de Catalunya had been restored as the government of Catalonia, he became a member of the Council of Education and Culture, and president of the Standing Committee for the Catalan Language.

He also supported the Floral Games of the Catalan Language which took place in exile. He entered several times, and his involvement in one competition, which took place in Geneva in 1972, led to him receiving a large fine, which was imposed by the Spanish authorities.

=== Educationalist ===
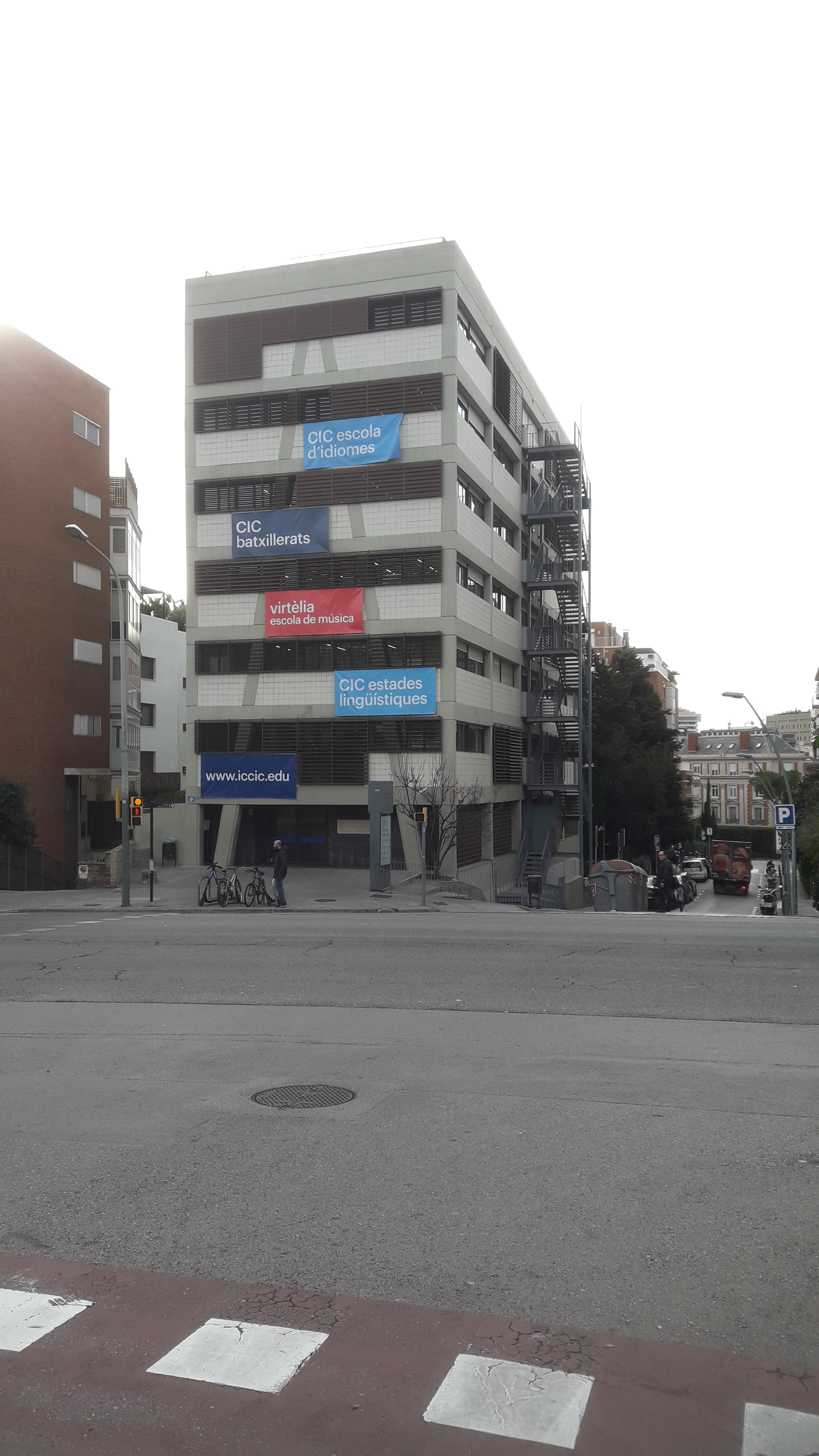
CIC Cultural Institution

He began to teach at various schools and institutions during his time at university, and he continued these classes on a private basis during his time in Cantonigròs, and resumed this work after his time in England. Francesc Candel was one of his Catalan students. He began his work with the Cultural Institution of the Centre of Catholic Influence in 1951, of which he became the director, and while there he founded the Thau School, where he worked as the director and as a teacher. He subsequently also taught at the Betània School.

Triadú was also a founder of the Catalan Council of Education in 1975. He became the first president of the Catalan Society of Pedagogy, a body affiliated to the Institute of Catalan Studies, in a position he held between 1984 and 1986. He retired in the summer of 1997.

=== Death ===
He died on 30 September 2010 in Barcelona. His funeral was held in the parish of Barcelona of Santa Teresa of the Infant Jesus, with his coat covered by the Catalan flag and heard by squadron masters in a gala uniform. His remains rest at the Cantonigròs cemetery.

== Honours, prizes and distinctions and legacy ==
Just after the Spanish Civil War, he collaborated on the National Front of Catalonia in the writing of articles in the Bulletin of Catalonia. Throughout Francoist Spain he actively participated in the Catalan cultural resistance against the dictatorship.

He was a member of the International Association of Catalan Language and Literature, the PEN Club, the Association of Catalan Language Writers (AELC) and the Institut d'Estudis Catalans, as well as the Advisory Board of the Platform for the Language.

In 1978 he was elected an associate member of the Institute of Catalan Studies. Since 1991, the Regional Council of Ripollès, his native region, has honoured the figure of Triadú with a schoolchildren's literary contest, the Joan Triadú Children's and Youth Literary Awards.

=== Honours ===
- In 1981 he received the first prize Ramon Fuster, from the College of Doctors and Graduates in Philosophy and Arts and Sciences of Catalonia, for his work as a teacher.
- In 1982 he was awarded the Creu de Sant Jordi Award of the Generalitat de Catalunya.
- In 1987, the Guild of Editors awarded him the Atlantis prize, for his work as a literary critic.
- In 1992 he won the Honor Prize for Catalan Letters.
- In 1997 the city council of Barcelona awarded him the Medal for Scientific Merit.
- In 1998 he was awarded an Honorary Doctorate by the Ramon Llull University
- In 2001 he was distinguished with the Gold Medal of the Generalitat of Catalonia.
- In 2009 his memo book Memories of a Golden Age won the Serra d'Or Critics Award for biographies and memoirs.

=== Exhibition ===
In January 2013 a commemorative travelling exhibition was inaugurated at the Palau Robert in Barcelona, that was curated by Joan Josep Isern and Susanna Àlvarez. It is a project of the Generalitat de Catalunya and the Fundació Flos and designed to remember and at the same time to pay a tribute to the teacher, writer and cultural activist. The exhibition is entitled Read how to live. Tribute to Joan Triadú. 1921-2010. The opening of the exhibition and the audiovisual projection about Joan Triadú took place on Thursday, January 17, at 7 pm, with the presence of the Minister for the Presidency, Francisco Homs. Also present, among other authorities, were the general manager of citizen attention and dissemination, Ignasi Genovese, the president of the Foundation for Flos and minutely calculated and son of the honoree, Joaquim Triadú, as well as other family members and personalities from the world of education and literature.

The show is in the first person, on the basis of selected texts from the memories of a golden age, a text by Joan Triadú, combining the biographical genre with the memorialístic. The content of the exhibition is developed in these areas: who i am and why I write; I come from that I say "below"; All you have to do as if it were the last time; Demanding in poetry; In the middle way of life; Teacher is the one who frees us, and read how to live. The sample provides a lot of information about his life and presents excerpts from his works, personal items, a selection of letters of intellectuals such as Carles Riba, Mercè Rodoreda, Baltasar Porcel ... and an audiovisual in which Joan Triadú tells his life and professional career. The exhibition has continuity in the garden with a selection of texts by Joan Triadú that highlight the importance given to education as a means to change and improve the people.

=== Triadú year ===
The government of the Generalitat de Catalunya announced in December 2020 that 2021 would be the Year of Joan Triadú, to commemorate the centenary of his birth. In order to coordinate the various initiatives, a Centenary Organisation Group was formed, consisting of Teresa and Joaquim Triadú i Vila-Abadal, Carles Duarte, Susanna Álvarez i Rodolés and Joan Josep Isern. The latter was the Curator of Triadú Year. Twenty-seven lectures, 4 round table discussions and 3 academic events on the life and work of Joan Triadú were scheduled between January 2021 and June 2022. Three exhibitions were also organised, as well as several other activities.

=== Personal archive ===
Joan Triadú's personal archive has been preserved in the National Archives of Catalonia. The archive contains the documentation produced and received by Joan Triadú i Font; the result of his creative output, it contains his original work (primarily articles and diaries); and from his activities with associations, documentation relating to lectures, speeches, courses, book presentations, round table discussions and other cultural events, especially those of a literary nature. The archive includes thematic dossiers on topics, activities and institutions with which the producer maintained a close relationship: notebooks on reading (1932–1938), on the Cantonigròs poetry competition (1944–1968), on the controversy surrounding Josep Pla, about the Catalan Studies Advisory Council and the Standing Committee for the Catalan Language and the request for the Nobel Prize for Salvador Espriu. Finally, it contains the extensive correspondence he received from figures in the cultural world, including Clementina Arderiu, Avel·lí Artís-Gener, Josep Maria Batista i Roca, Xavier Benguerel, Pere Calders, Salvador Espriu, Josep Vicenç Foix, Marià Manent, Miquel Martí i Pol, Francesc de Borja Moll and Mercè Rodoreda.

== Bibliography ==
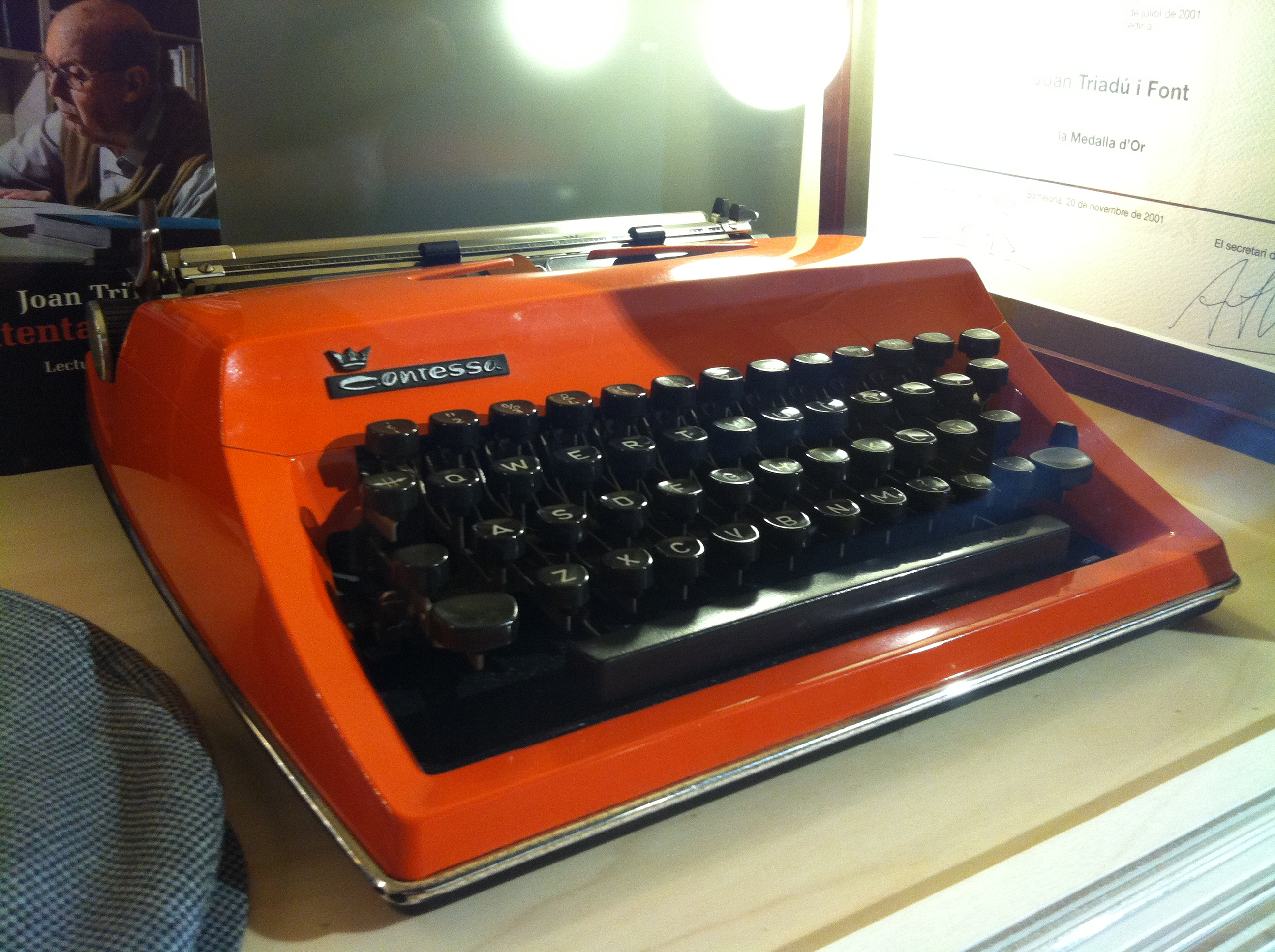
Joan Triadú typewriter

=== Poetry ===
- 1948: Endimió. Barcelona: Ariadna.
- 1956: El Collsacabra. Barcelona: Els Cinquanta-Cinc.

==== Works of Literary criticism ====
- Panorama of Catalan poetry, Panorama de la poesia catalana. 1953 Barcelona: Barcino.
- The poetry according to Carles Riba, La poesia segons Carles Riba. 1954 Barcelona: Barcino.
- La l, iteratura catalana i el poble. 1961 Barcelona: Selecta.
- Llegir com viure. 1963 Barcelona: Fontanella.
- Prudenci Bertrana per ell mateix. 1967 Barcelona: Ed. 62.
- Lectures escollides. 1969 Barcelona: Barcino.
- Una cultura sense llibertat. 1978 Barcelona: Proa.
- La novel·la catalana de postguerra. 1982 Barcelona: Ed. 62.
- La poesia catalana de postguerra. 1985 Barcelona: Ed. 62.
- Per comprendre Carles Riba. 1993 Manresa.
- La ciutat dels llibres. 1999 Barcelona: Proa.

=== Biography ===
- 1954: Narcís Oller. Barcelona: Barcino.

=== Memoirs ===
- 2001: Dies de memòria 1938-1940. Barcelona: Proa.

=== Anthologies ===
- 2003: 100 poesies catalanes que cal conèixer. De Verdaguer a M. Mercè Marçal. Barcelona: Pòrtic.

=== Collected letters ===
- 2005: Collected letters between Jordi Arbonès and Joan Triadú (1964–1997), edited by

Montserrat Bacardí and Susanna Álvarez. Quaderns. Translation journal 12 (2005), p. 171-182. 85–113.

- 2009: Dear friend. Letters-Texts (Pere Calders and Joan Triadú), edited by Montserrat Bacardí

and Susanna Álvarez. Barcelona: Publicacions de l'Abadia de Montserrat, 2009.

- 2009: Collected letters between Joan Coromines and Josep M. Batista i Roca, Joan Triadú,

Albert Manent, edited by Josep Ferrer. Foreword by Carles Duarte. Barcelona: Edicions Curial, 2009.

- 2014: The lost suitcase (Further letters to Joan Triadú by Pere Calders), edited by Montserrat

Bacardí and Susanna Álvarez. Barcelona: Publicacions de l'Abadia de Montserrat, 2014.

- 2015: Joan Triadú. Letters to Carme Porta, edited and presented by Montserrat Bacardí and

Susanna Álvarez. Barcelona: Biblioteca del Núvol, 2015.

- Triadú, Joan; Riera Llorca, Vicenç; Ferrer, Joan; Marquès, Joan Pujadas i (2022). Epistolari-textos. Biblioteca Serra d'Or, 524 (1st ed.). Barcelona: Publicacions de l'Abadia de Montserrat. ISBN 9788491912231. OCLC 1325640684.
