= Luis Pericot Garcia =

Spanish archaeologist and historian

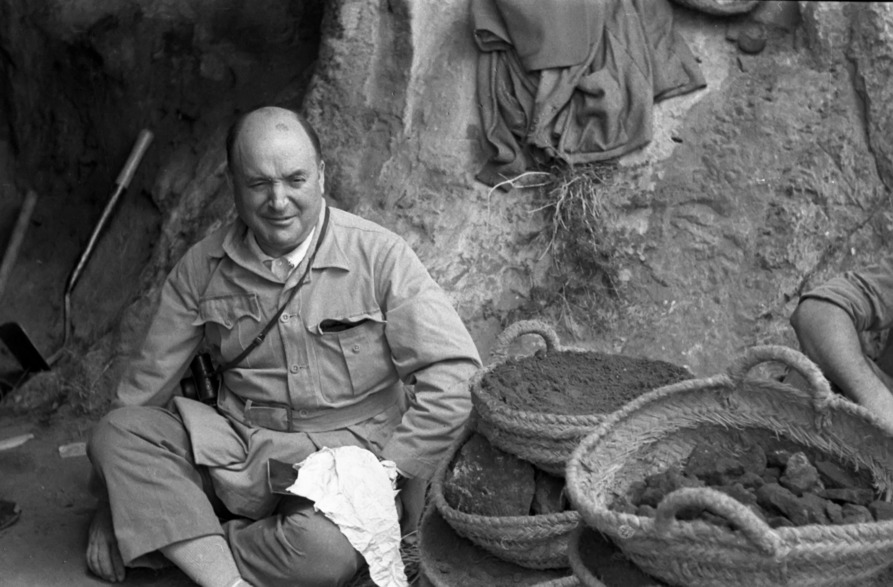

Luis Pericot Garcia (2 September 1899 – 12 October 1978) was a Spanish archaeologist and historian, specializing in prehistory. He was President of the PanAfrican Archaeological Association from 1963 to 1967.

He was a corresponding fellow of the British Academy.
