= Maria Àngels Anglada =

Spanish poet and novelist

- Born: 9 March 1920
- Died: 23 April 1999 (aged 79)
- Occupations: Poet, Writer

Maria Àngels Anglada was a Catalan poet and novelist. She was born in Vic, Spain, in 1920. She received a degree in Classical Philology at the University of Barcelona. Her first novel, Les Closes (The Enclosures), won the 1978 Josep Pla Award. Her 1985 novel Sandàlies d'escuma (Sandals of Foam) won the Lletra d'Or Prize. She died in 1999.

== Bibliography ==
- Díptic (1972), poetry (with Núria Albó)
- Les Closes (1979), novel
- Kyapartssia (1980)
- No em dic Laura (1981), short stories
- Viola d'amore (1983), novel
- Columnes d'hores (1990), poetry
- The Violin of Auschwitz (1994), novel
- Sandàlies d'escuma (1985), novel
- Quadern d'Aram (1997), novel
