= Joan Francesc Mira i Casterà =

Spanish writer, anthropologist and sociologist

Joan Francesc Mira
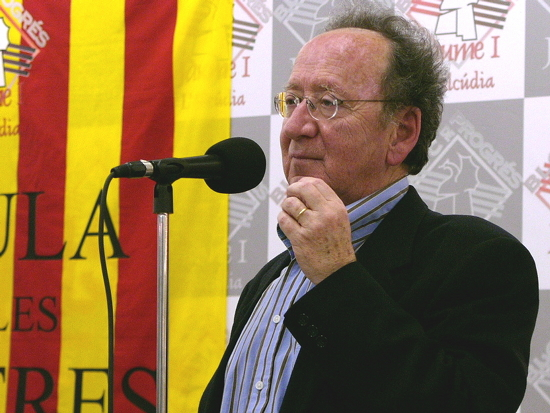
- Mira in L'Alcúdia, November 2007
- Born: 3 December 1939 (age 86); Valencia (Spain)
- Occupation: Writer
- Writing career
- Language: Catalan / Valencian
- Period: 1974 – present
- Genres: Essay, poetry
- Notable works: Crítica de la nació pura Sobre la nació dels valencians
- Website: www.joanfmira.info

Joan Francesc Mira i Casterà (born 3 December 1939, in Valencia, Spain) is a Spanish writer, anthropologist and sociologist. He is an honorary member of the Associació d'Escriptors en Llengua Catalana and President of Acció Cultural del País Valencià. In politics he is a supporter and has been a candidate of Valencian Nationalist Bloc in 2000 and 2003.

Around the valencianist and historical theme, his works include Crítica de la Nació Pura (1985), in which he discusses the concept of nation, Sobre la nació dels valencians (1997) and Els Borja, família i mite ("The Borgia: family and myth", 2000).

== Biography ==
In 1959, he obtained a bachelor's degree from Pontifical Gregorian University, and the following year, also in Rome, he graduated in philosophy from Lateran University. In 1962, he graduated in Philosophy from the University of Valencia, and he received his PhD in Philosophy from the same university in 1971. He later worked as a professor of Ancient Greek language in 1983 and 1991, when he reached the chair of this language in the Jaume I University where he developed his teaching. In 1991 he received the Creu de Sant Jordi Award for his civic engagement. Also in 1999 became a member of the Institute of Catalan Studies.

During the seventies, he collaborated in the Laboratoire d'Anthropologie Sociale from Sorbonne, and in 1978+1979 he was a lecturer at Princeton University. He directed the Valencian Institute of Sociology and Social Anthropology between 1980 and 1984, and in 1982 he founded the Museum of Ethnology in Valencia, an institution that he directed until 1984.

He is also author of novels and short stories as El bou de foc (1974), Els cucs de seda (1975), Viatge al final del fred (1984), Els treballs perduts (1989) – Lectors del Temps Award, 1990 and a thematic approach to Ulysses from Joyce-, Borja Papa (1996), Quatre qüestions d'amor (1998) and Purgatori (2002).

As a translator, include versions of The Divine Comedy (2001), the Gospel (2004) and the Odyssey (2011)

In 2009, he was awarded the Premi de la Crítica de narrativa catalana 2008 for his work El professor d'historia.

== Works ==
=== Novels ===
- El bou de foc (1974)
- Els cucs de seda (1975)
- El desig dels dies (1981)
- Viatge al final del fred (1983)
- El treballs perduts (1989)
- Borja Papa (1996)
- Purgatori (2002)
- El professor d'història (2008)
- El tramvia groc (2013)

=== Short stories ===
- Quatre qüestions d'amor (1998)
- Els cucs de seda (1975)

=== Essays, studies, biographies ===
- Som. Llengua i Literatura (1974)
- Un estudi d'antropologia social al País Valencià: els pobles de Vallalta i Miralcamp (1974)
- Els valencians i la terra (1978)
- Introducció a un País (1980)
- Població i llengua al País Valencià (1981)
- Crítica de la nació pura (1985)
- Hèrcules i l'antropòleg (1994)
- Sense música ni pàtria (1995)
- Sobre la nació dels valencians (1997)
- Cap d'any a Houston (1998)
- Els Borja. Família i mite (2000)
- Sant Vicent Ferrer. Vida i llegenda d'un predicador (2002)
- La prodigiosa història de Vicent Blasco Ibáñez (2004)
- Vida i final dels moriscos valencians (2009)
- En un món fet de nacions (2008)
- Europeus. Retrat en setanta imatges (2010)

=== Translations ===
- Borja Papa (1997)
- Valencia para visitantes y vecinos (1999)
- Los Borja: familia y mito (2000)
- El tramvia (2001), from Claude Simon
- La divina comèdia (2001)
- Evangelis (2004)
- l'Odissea (2011)
