= Manuel Sanchis i Guarner =

Spanish, philologist, historian and writer

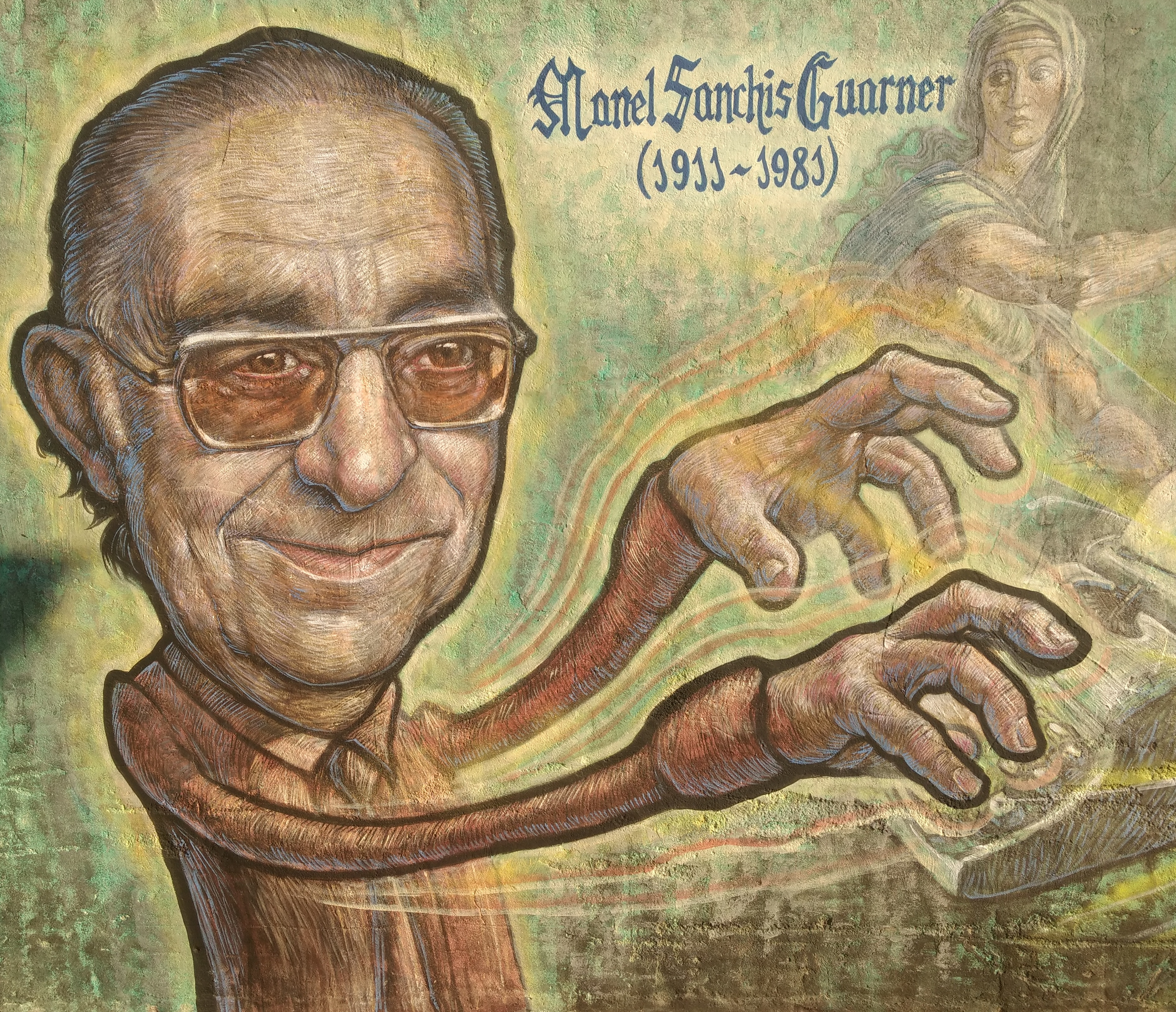
View of the Mural in 2017, after the segona phase of the mateix.

Manuel Sanchís Guarner (1911 in Valencia – 1981) was a Spanish philologist, historian and writer.

He was an author of a vast work ranging from studies of linguistics, literature, history, ethnography to popular culture, basically centered on the Valencian Community, but also on the rest of the territories of the ancient Crown of Aragon and the whole Iberian Peninsula.

His most famous contributions were La llengua dels valencians (The language of the Valencians), first published in 1933, la Gramàtica valenciana (Valencian grammar) (1950), Els pobles valencians parlen els uns dels altres (Valencian towns speak about each other), or Aproximació a la història de la llengua catalana (An approach to the history of the Catalan language) (1980). He also collaborated in some major works such as Diccionari Català-Valencià-Balear (Catala-Valencian-Balearic dictionary) or Història del País Valencià (History of the Valencian Country). In 1974, he was rewarded with the Honor Prize of the Catalan Letters.
