= Creu de Sant Jordi =

Catalan award

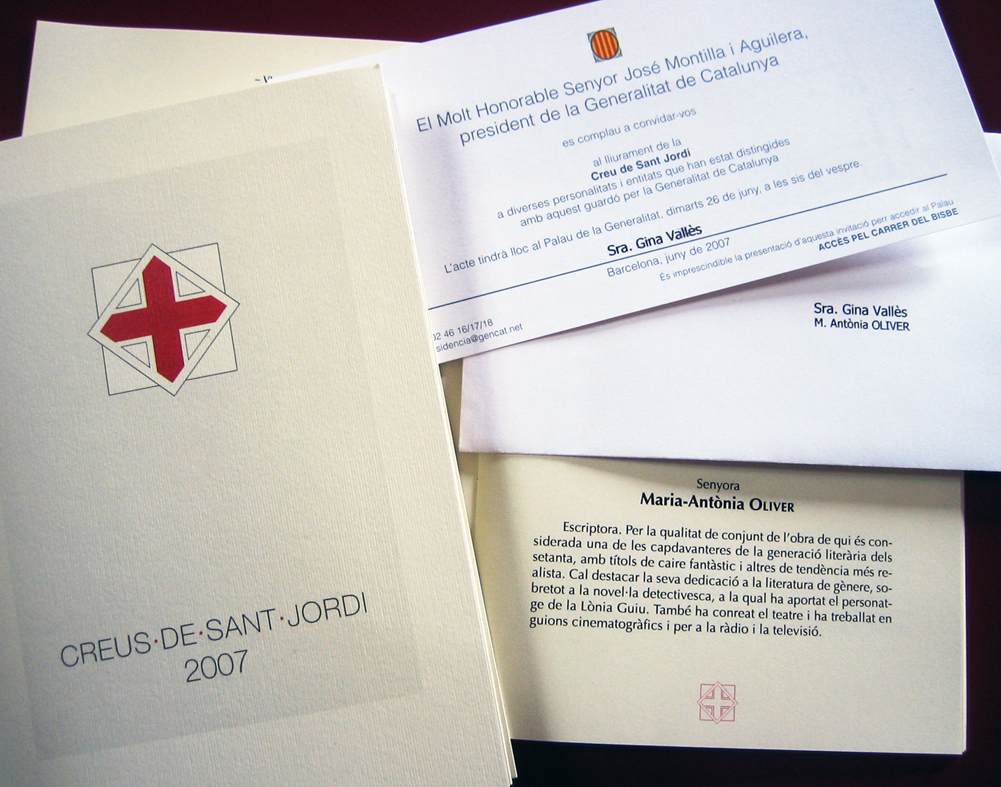
This award was named after Saint George, one of the main symbols of Catalonia.

The Creu de Sant Jordi (Catalan pronunciation: [ˈkɾɛw ðə ˌsaɲ ˈʒɔɾði], in English 'St George's Cross') is one of the highest civil distinctions awarded in Catalonia (Spain), surpassed only in protocol by the Gold Medal of the Generalitat de Catalunya. It was established by the Generalitat de Catalunya autonomous government by virtue of the Decret 457/1981 de 18 de desembre in 1981. The medal was designed by goldsmith Joaquim Capdevila.

== Recipients ==
- List of recipients of the Creus de Sant Jordi
- List of awardees in the Balearic Islands
